= Hotel Cecil (Southport) =

Public house in Southport, Australia

- The Hotel Cecil as it appeared in the South Coast Bulletin, 18 November 1938
- Location within Queensland Location within Australia
- 27°58′4″S 153°24′50″E
- Type: public house
- Location: Southport

History
- Built: March 1908, October 1938

Site notes
- Architect(s): G.H.M. Addison and Son, and H.S. MacDonald
- Architectural style: Art Deco
- Current use: Public house, retail and offices

The Hotel Cecil is an Art Deco hotel located on the south western corner of the intersection of Scarborough and Nerang Streets in Southport, Queensland, Australia. It has been recommended that it be added to the Queensland Heritage Register due to its rarity, high architectural value and contribution to the character of the street.

It is the largest privately owned building on the Southport Heritage Walk, a good example of a hotel built in the 1930s and a prominent landmark of social and historical significance to the community.

The current hotel is the second building on the site and is an integral part of an early twentieth century streetscape that included the heritage listed Southport Town Hall, an earlier Ambulance Station and a number of buildings designed by the architect Thomas Ramsay Hall.

After over 100 years of operation, the Hotel Cecil, also referred to as the Cecil Hotel and B.DeMille's, is the oldest public house on the Gold Coast to maintain its original name throughout all its years of operation.

== History (1907-1937) ==
Tenders for the construction of the original two storey wooden building on the site were called for in July 1907 with plans available for viewing at Stephens and Tozer's offices at 240 Queen Street, Goodna, Brisbane, Queensland. The building was constructed by D.J. Coulster with R.M. Pidd working as the leading hand. From early February 1908 the hotel was advertising for staff and, by early March 1908, it was welcoming guests and advertised as being 'newly erected'.

The first proprietor and host of the Hotel Cecil was Harry Taylor, formerly a blacksmith at Nerang, who arranged for the construction of the building, owned the freehold on the property and occupied the hotel as the licensee with his wife and daughter. Reservations for the hotel, which had capacity to accommodate 40 guests, could be made in advance by sending a postcard. The hotel offered a horse drawn buggy service that transported guests from the nearby Southport Railway Station on the South Coast railway line, Queensland to the hotel. In addition to guests intending to stay overnight, day trippers taking advantage of special excursion trains from the surrounding areas could spend the day at Southport and dine at the Cecil Hotel before returning home in the evening.

The hotel was also the venue for significant functions including an official dinner for the Governor-General of India Edward Frederick Lindley Wood, 1st Earl of Halifax, in 1926. Other gatherings that took place included balls, school reunions, meetings of the local Chamber of Commerce and fund raising events.

A number of prominent local people were associated with the Hotel Cecil including Sidney Monkhouse, Vincent, W. Austen, M.C. Gosling, W.J. Gorman and Cyril Hornibrook Culby.

== History (1938-1999) ==
In June 1938 the then owners of the hotel, the Queensland Brewery Ltd, with the licensee Thomas Campbell Andrews, oversaw the relocation of the original timber structure to another location on the same site prior to construction of a new two storey brick hotel. Andrews, a Southport businessman and bachelor originally from Mudgeeraba, had taken over the licence in 1936 and held it until his sudden death in 1939 a few months after the new building was completed.

The new hotel was designed by Addison and MacDonald, an architectural firm that was active between 1927 and 1947 that consisted of George Frederick Addison, the son and business partner of one of Brisbane's earliest architects George Henry Male Addison, and Herbert Stanley MacDonald formerly of Hall and Prentice. In addition to designing the Goondiwindi Civic Centre, the firm undertook work for both the Queensland Brewery Company and Castlemaine Perkins during this period, including the XXXX Brewery and the State Heritage Registered Castlemaine Perkins Building and Queensland Brewery Company Building. The architects reported that the Queensland Brewery Ltd, had given them a 'free hand' in designing the 'palatial structure' which was built by K.E. Morris of Brisbane.

Construction took four months and, in October 1938, the new saloon and public bars were officially open. The new Art Deco styled hotel was reported as having 'outstanding architectural features' with a curved facade facing the corner of Scarborough and Nerang Streets with the name of the hotel in cement letters accented in red and pale green. Twenty guest rooms were located on the first floor with the bridal suite featuring a curved private balcony overlooking the intersection below. The exterior of the building included brown and cream tiles with Venetian red bricks cut through with cream bands. The roofing tiles were multi-coloured Marseilles tiles. The interior decoration of the hotel was in red, green and autumnal tones and featured polished chromium strips and patterned sand blasted glass doors with seaside themed decorative elements.

After World War II, the hotel was leased for twenty years to Claude and Hedwig Anna Slack (née Eschenhagen) after they ceased running a guest house in London and returned to Australia. The Eschenhagen family had a strong association with the hospitality industry in Queensland and were well respected early caterers and restaurateurs in Brisbane. Following her involvement with the Hotel Cecil, Anna Slack retired in Southport.

== History (2000-2016) ==
The hotel underwent a refurbishment in 2000 to create office and retail space which is leased to a variety of tenants. In 2014, the track for the Gold Coast Light Rail was constructed along the northern street and eastern frontages of the building. The main station for Southport is located opposite the hotel in the middle of Southport's central business district.
