= Southport Bathing Pavilion =

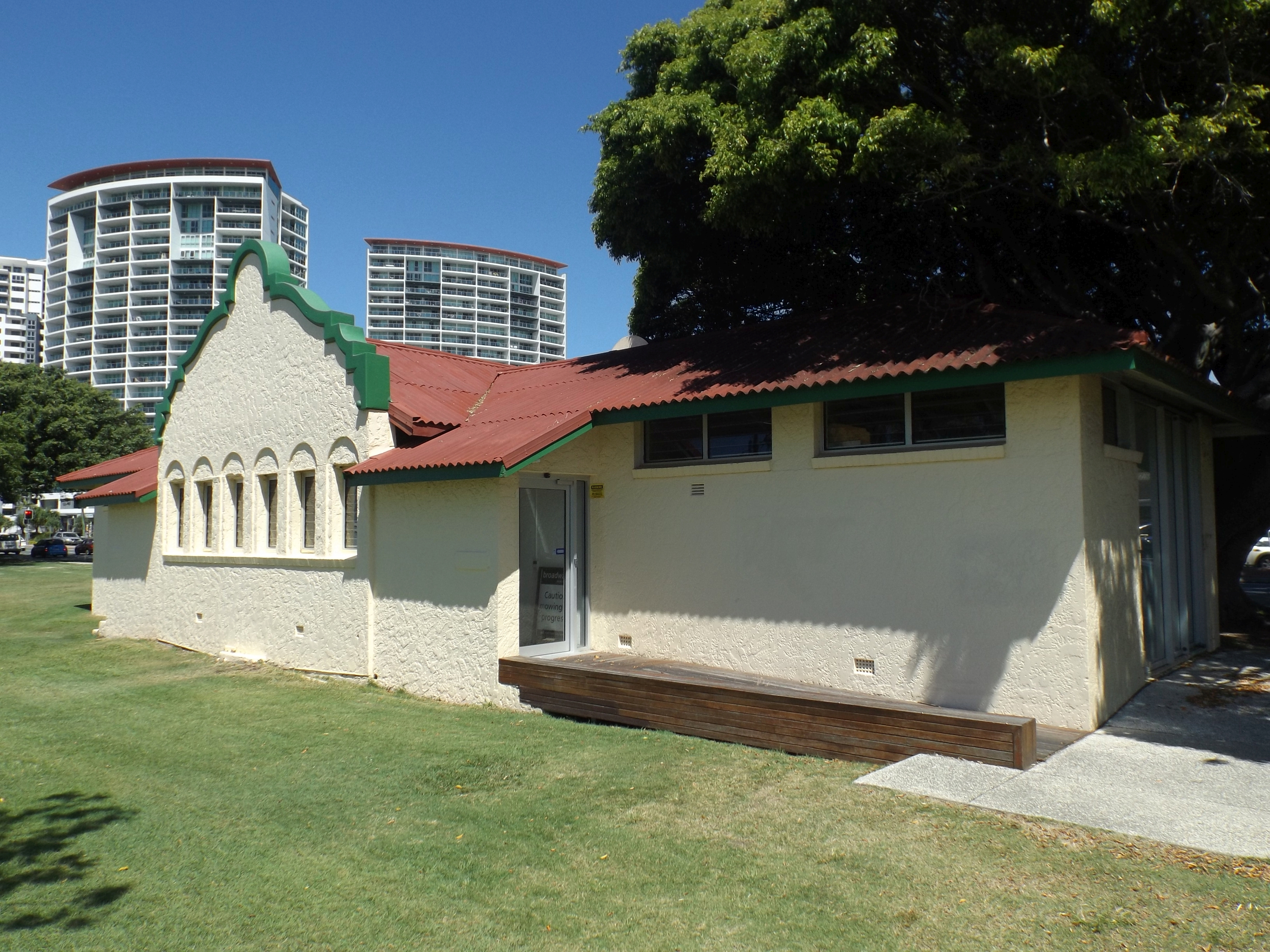
- Building in 2015

- Location within Queensland Location within Australia
- 27.9621°S 153.4135°E
- Location: Marine Parade, Southport, Gold Coast City, Queensland, Australia

History
- Design period: 1919–1930s (interwar period)
- Built: 1934–1934

Site notes
- Architect: Hall & Phillips
- Architectural style: Spanish Mission

Queensland Heritage Register
- Official name: Southport Bathing Pavilion
- Type: state heritage (built)
- Designated: 13 January 1995
- Reference no.: 601514
- Significant period: 1934 (fabric); 1934–1960s (historical)
- Builders: A Ledbury

Southport Bathing Pavilion is a heritage-listed changing rooms at Marine Parade, Southport, Gold Coast City, Queensland, Australia. It was designed by Hall & Phillips and built in 1934 by A. Ledbury. It was added to the Queensland Heritage Register on 13 January 1995.

== History ==
This single storeyed building was built in 1934 by the Southport Town Council, as a dressing and showering facility for bathers using the Broadwater. The architects were Hall and Phillips and the contractor A. Ledbury, who built the pavilion at a cost of £1,195.

The pavilion was erected at an important stage of the development of the coastal regions of South East Queensland. There was unprecedented growth in these areas as swimming and sun bathing became increasingly popular. The majority of the population, by the late 1930s benefited from paid holiday leave, increasing their leisure time. The councils of the various coastal regions were competing for holiday trade, beautification schemes and the provision of public facilities on the beach fronts were part of this attempt to attract the seasonal beach-goer.

Queensland has a long history of sea-side resorts. In the 1860s, Sandgate and to a lesser extent Cleveland were popular destinations for beach-goers. With the introduction of the Sandgate railway in 1882 Sandgate's beaches became more accessible and Southport developed as an alternate coastal resort. Logging began in the area in the late 1850s and settlement was opened in the mid-1870s with the first sales of land. By the 1880s major Brisbane families favoured Southport as the premier seaside resort in south east Queensland. Major schools, branches of banks and hotels were constructed, as Southport assumed the appearance of a fashionable nineteenth century resort. Southport's distinction as a seaside resort is indicated by the Queensland Governor's maintaining a residence here from the 1890s. The South Coast railway line, a rail extension from Beenleigh to Southport, was opened in 1889 making Southport more accessible from Brisbane.

With increased accessibility and popularity at beaches, the necessity for bathing controls was realised. Bathing at the beach became increasingly prevalent in the late 19th century. By 1906 Section 109 of the Local Government Act allowed individual local councils to control swimming and swim-wear, nominating standards for bathing costumes, segregating bathing and defining bathing areas.

In the first decades of the century councils permitted privately owned bathing sheds on the beaches, which provided immediate access to the water after changing. In the 1920s, custom became more relaxed toward bathing in public. Councils, realising the possible financial benefits from holiday makers provided firstly public dressing sheds and, later, bathing pavilions.

During the thirties various councils of the coastal regions of south east Queensland such as Southport Town Council, Coolangatta Town Council and Nerang Shire Council on the south coast as well as Redcliffe Town Council and north coast councils, competed for holiday visitors. Chambers of Commerce and Progress Committees urged the councils to develop and beautify foreshore areas, in an attempt to attract visitors. As part of this process the Southport Town Council began a scheme to develop the Esplanade area, on which the Bathing Pavilion was to stand, as a recreational and entertainment area. This scheme was similar to those introduced in New South Wales at Manly, Bondi Beach and Newcastle beaches in the late twenties and early thirties. The development of the Esplanade included tree-planting schemes, the addition of various side-show amusements and the construction of a picture theatre on the Southport Pier.

It was as part of the scheme of beautification at Southport that two bathing pavilions were erected, the Main Beach Pavilion and the other smaller building, the Southport Bathing Pavilion on the Esplanade close to the Southport railway station. As the buildings neared completion, the owners of private bathing boxes were given one month's notice to remove the structures. The two new buildings were opened on 20 December 1934 by the Minister for Works, Mr Harry Bruce. During a speech at the ceremony, mention was made of Southport being primarily dependent on visitors, and if something was not done for their comfort and convenience (Southport) would lose them. A newspaper report described the design of the buildings as Spanish.

Both of the bathing pavilions were designed by the Brisbane architectural partnership, Hall and Phillips who were responsible for the design of many of Southport's public buildings including the Southport Council Chambers (1934), the Pier Theatre (1921), accommodation units (1928), service station (1929) and various business premises as well as the bathing pavilions and clubhouse for the Southport Surf Lifesaving Club (1936).

Southport gradually lost its prestige as the premier resort of the South Coast when the Jubilee Bridge across the Nerang River built in 1925 and new roads and improved transport made the southern beaches more accessible. In the 1930s and 1940s, development of holiday apartments and hotels at Surfers Paradise increased the area's popularity, as did widescale promotion of the area. The surfing revolution of the 1950s and 1960s, resulted in rapid development of the south coast particularly Surfers Paradise. The three south coast councils amalgamated in 1949 to form the South Coast Council, later renamed the Gold Coast Council. From the mid-1960s the region has experienced rapid commercial growth which has greatly altered the environment. Five chains of land was resumed on the beach side of the in 1965. As a result, the Southport Bathing Pavilion is marooned in a large park. The resumption of land at the Esplanade, on Stradbroke Island and the Southport Spit has caused silt deposits in the Broadwater, making it unsuitable for bathing.

For some time the pavilion was no longer used as public dressing and showering sheds and the Council closed it to the public to use it for gardening and maintenance storage. During 2008–2009, the bathing pavilion was refurbished and made available for community use. By 2014 it was the temporary home of the Southport Amateur Fishing Club.

== Description ==
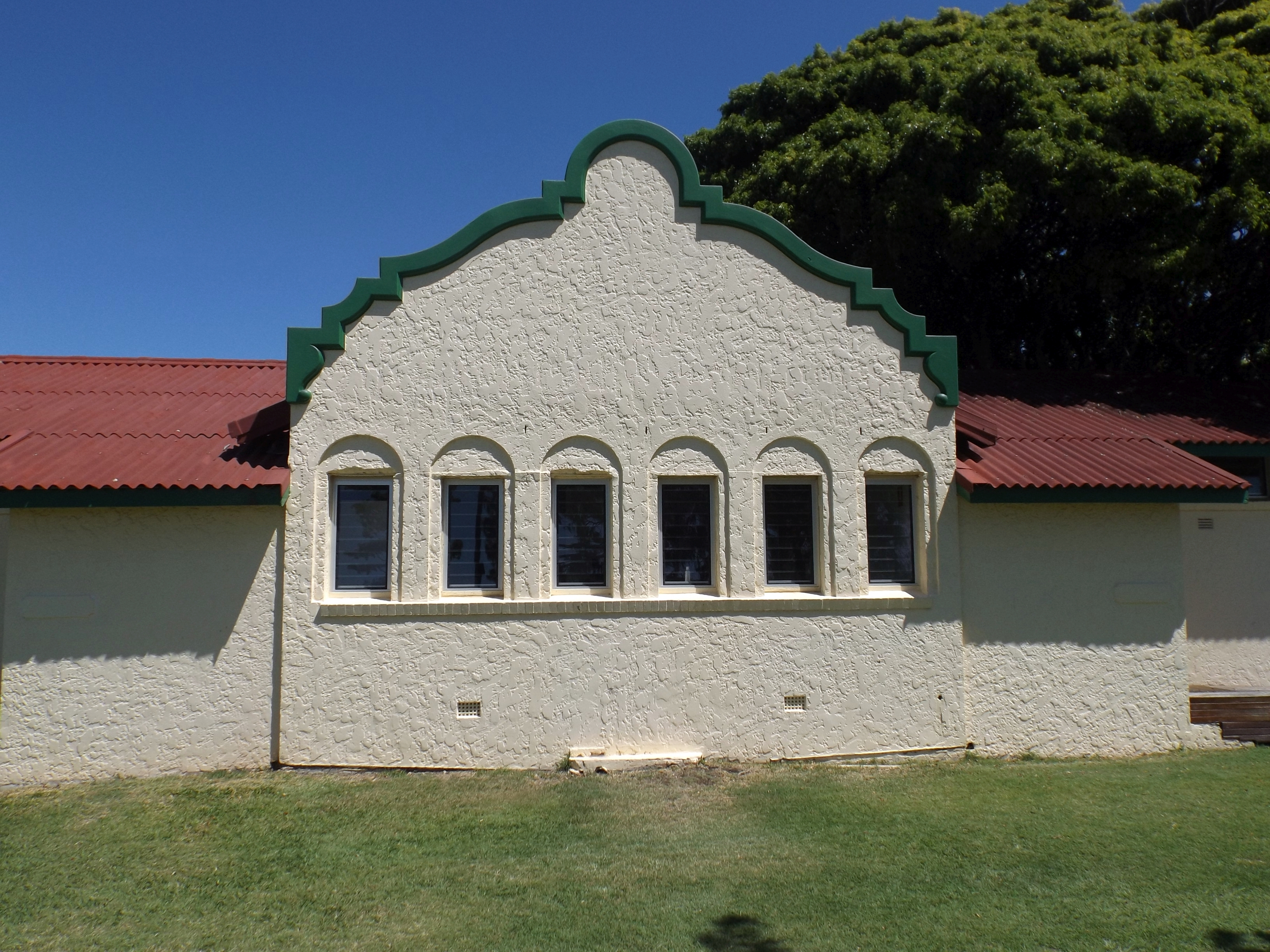
Beach facing side

The Southport Bathing Pavilion is a single storeyed masonry building rendered with roughcast stucco, that is prominently located on Marine Parade at Southport. A brick and concrete structure with corrugated asbestos cement roof, it is flanked by two large established trees.

The Southport Bathing Pavilion demonstrates the influence of a Spanish Mission style of architecture particularly with the decorative parapeted gables, roughcast stucco render, entrance loggia, prominent roof with corrugated sheeting reminiscent of the cordova tile and arched openings.

Symmetrically arranged the building is rectangular in plan with central projecting bays on the west and east elevation. Decorative parapeted gables form the facade of the projecting bays. The parapets conceal the gabled roof which abuts them.

On the west elevation, which faces Marine Parade, the decorative gable element features a loggia, consisting of an open porch with three round headed arches supported on two "barley sugar" twisted columns. The arches feature prominent keystone and raised edge detailing. Directly above the porch on the gable lettering spells "BATHING PAVILION", with a cartouche with the date of construction, 1934. The edge of the stylised Baroque parapet has raised edge detailing which culminate in spiralled curves on the face of the gable. There are three doorways from the loggia, one of which has an overhead window opening, now boarded. The eastern elevation has a similar decorative parapeted gable housing six boarded window openings. The surrounds of these windows are round headed arched recesses. The skillion roofed wings on either side of the parapet element, previously fin walls forming entrances, are now infilled with weatherboard.

There are high level window openings with face brick sills on all sides of the wings. Most of these windows are boarded or battened. The north elevation has a large metal door allowing vehicular access to the building.

The interior of the pavilion has two large spaces, a small room, accessible only from the loggia and two small enclosures on the eastern wall facing the arched window openings. The wall separating the original halves has been partially dismantled, as have sections of other walls around the entrances. The entire space is open to the timber roof trusses and the underside of the roof sheeting. The smaller rooms have individual ceilings immediately overhead, the space above which is open. The floor is concrete and the internal walls are rendered brick.

There is evidence in the two small rooms on the eastern wall of plumbing fixtures. The concrete floor in these spaces slopes toward an outside corner. There are sections of an early towel peg rail and early timber bench seating around the external walls in both halves of the building. Evidence in the concrete floor indicates the position of previous fittings.

== Heritage listing ==
Southport Bathing Pavilion was listed on the Queensland Heritage Register on 13 January 1995 having satisfied the following criteria.

The place is important in demonstrating the evolution or pattern of Queensland's history.

The Southport Bathing Pavilion, erected in 1934, is one of a group of buildings pivotal in understanding the development of the Gold Coast as a beach resort and in reflecting a new culture associated with beach going. It provides evidence of the former use and scope of the area known as the Esplanade and the surrounding beach.

The place demonstrates rare, uncommon or endangered aspects of Queensland's cultural heritage.

It is a now rare example of the built environment at the south coast from the 1930s.

The place is important in demonstrating the principal characteristics of a particular class of cultural places.

The building is a good example of a Spanish Mission architectural influence and of the public work at Southport of the prominent architectural firm, Hall and Phillips.

The place has a special association with the life or work of a particular person, group or organisation of importance in Queensland's history.

The building is a good example of a Spanish Mission architectural influence and of the public work at Southport of the prominent architectural firm, Hall and Phillips.
