= Thomas Ramsay Hall =

- Born: 2 January 1879
- Died: 15 December 1950 (aged 71)
- Occupation: Architect
- Practice: Hall & Dods, Hall and Prentice, Hall and Phillips, Phillips Smith Conwell

Thomas Ramsay Hall (2 January 1879 – 15 December 1950) was an architect practicing in Brisbane, Australia, during the first half of the twentieth century and was involved in the design and construction of numerous major buildings in South East Queensland including the Queensland Heritage Register listed Brisbane City Hall.

== Life ==
Hall's plans for a hotel at Alexandra Headland, 1016

Thomas Ramsay Hall was born on 2 January 1879 and was the son of John R Hall, one of Brisbane's early architects, and his third wife Charlotte, née Whiteway. Thomas was the younger half-brother of Francis Richard Hall who was the oldest practicing architect in Australia at the time of his own death in 1939.

Hall attended Brisbane Grammar School from 1891 where he won the Francis memorial prize for mathematics. After graduation, he studied accountancy, architecture and became an approved valuer. From 1907 he was town clerk for Sandgate Council. On 9 March 1910 he married Emma Lingley at St Nicholas's Church, Sandgate. The couple had four children: Jean Charlotte, Sibyl, Jack Ramsay and W. R.

He was associated with the firm of Hall & Dods and, in the early 1900s, entered into partnership with George Gray Prentice and established the firm of Hall and Prentice. During 1922, he travelled to the United States of America to look at architectural advancements and practices, particularly relating to theatres and auditoriums, that could be adopted for use in Australia. In 1930 Hall and Lionel Blythewood Phillips became partners and formed Hall and Phillips. The firm eventually became Phillips Smith Conwell.

Throughout his career, Hall was involved with a number of significant buildings in Queensland including the Brisbane City Hall, Sandgate Town Hall, Southport Town Hall, Boonah Butter Factory, Ascot Chambers, McDonnell & East Ltd Building, Castlemaine Perkins Building, Main Beach Pavilion, Southport Surf Lifesaving Club and the Tattersalls Club.

Hall was involved in horse racing throughout his life and was a member of the Tattersalls Club and the Queensland Turf Club. The T.R. Hall Handicap is named in his honour. Between 1929 and 1931, after being a member for fifteen years, he became the president of the Tattersalls Club.

He was also involved with the Southport Golf Club for many years and the family had a holiday home called 'Niarda' in Southport where they hosted bridge parties and entertained guests. The property had extensive views of the Broadwater and was located on the Esplanade in the vicinity of the Southport Croquet Club.

In 1939 he was appointed to the Defence Works Advisory Panel started by the Prime Minister of Australia Robert Menzies to make economies and hasten essential construction activities during World War II.

Hall died on 15 December 1950.
