= Gold Coast Art Festival =

Australian art festival

The Gold Coast Art Festival was created in 2010 by sculptor Frederic Berjot. It takes place every year in March at the Southport Broadwater Parklands with the support of the Gold Coast City Council and Southport Broadwater Parklands. The one-month-long festival is attended by thousands of local and international visitors and engage 90 artists all together.

Since 2013, the Gold Coast art focuses on opening nonprofit, artist-run initiatives called Urban Paradise Gallery ()on the Gold Coast and Brisbane.

The new GCAF gallery is now located in Woolloongabba.
