= Castlemaine Perkins Building =

Heritage-listed building in Brisbane, Queensland

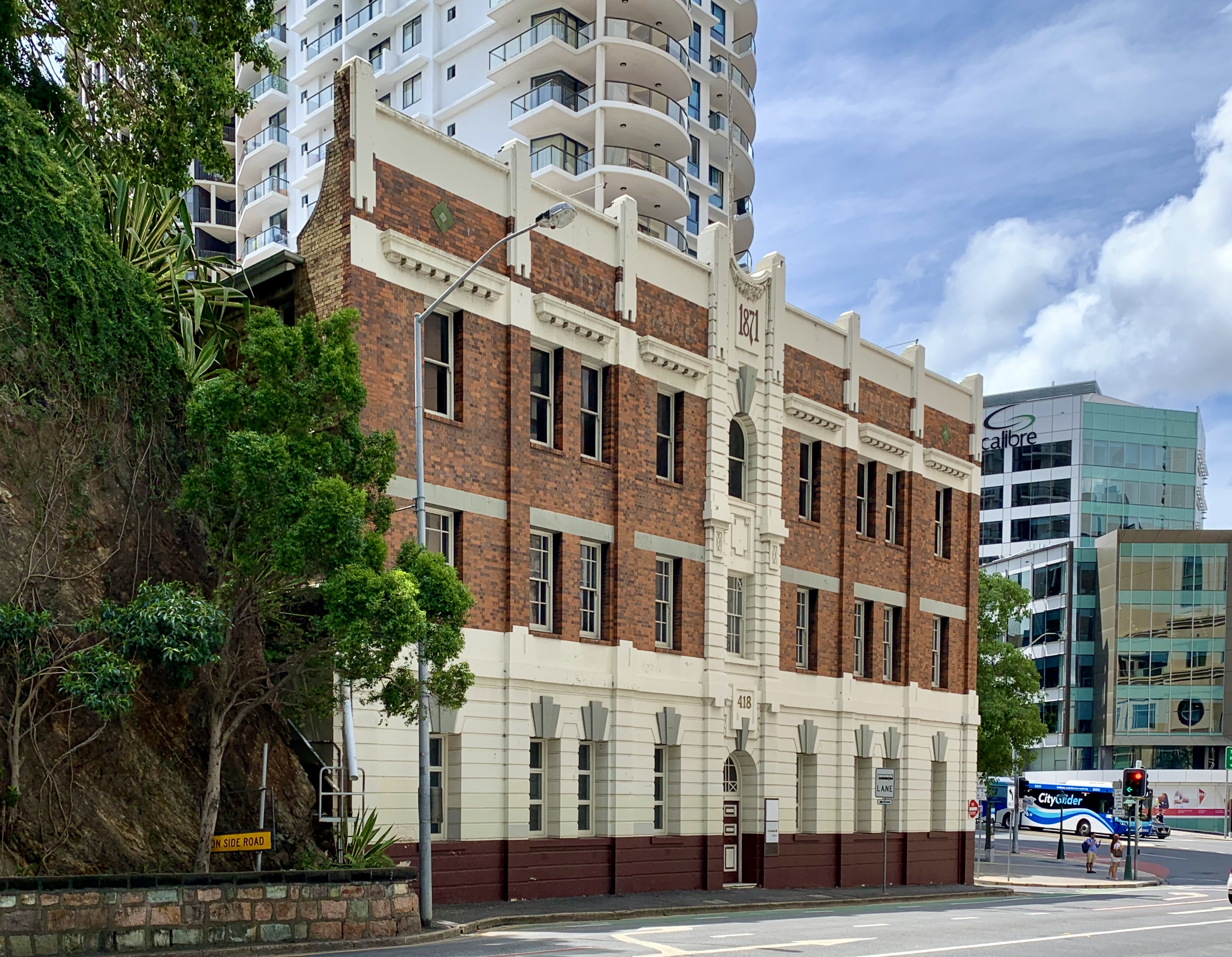
- Castlemaine Perkins Building, 2020

- Location within Queensland Location within Australia
- 27.4635°S 153.0308°E
- Location: 418–420 Adelaide Street, Brisbane City, City of Brisbane, Queensland, Australia

History
- Design period: 1900–1914 (early 20th century)
- Built: 1918–1919 & 1928–1929

Site notes
- Architect: Thomas Ramsay Hall
- Architectural style: Classicism

Queensland Heritage Register
- Official name: Castlemaine Perkins Ltd Building (former), Castlemaine Brewery and Quinlan, Gray & Co. Brisbane Ltd/Castlemaine Perkins Ltd Building (former)
- Type: state heritage (built)
- Designated: 6 March 2009
- Reference no.: 602684
- Significant period: c. 1900–early 1980s
- Significant components: loading bay/dock, office/s, warehouse
- Builders: George Albert Baumber

Castlemaine Perkins Building is a heritage-listed former warehouse at 418–420 Adelaide Street, Brisbane City, City of Brisbane, Queensland, Australia. It was designed by Thomas Ramsay Hall and built from 1918 to 1919 by George Albert Baumber and was extended in 1928 to 1929. It is also known as Castlemaine Brewery and Quinlan, Gray & Co Building. It was added to the Queensland Heritage Register on 6 March 2009.

== History ==
The building at 418–420 Adelaide Street was constructed in a number of stages between c. 1900 and 1928–1929. The main section (a two- and three-storeyed brick warehouse, bond store and office building) was erected in 1918–1919 for The Castlemaine Brewery and Quinlan, Gray & Co Brisbane Ltd (later Castlemaine Perkins). The designer, Brisbane architect Thomas Ramsay Hall, incorporated an earlier (c. 1900) two-storeyed stone warehouse into the structure. In 1928–1929 a new bulk store was added at the rear.

The Castlemaine Brewery and Quinlan, Gray & Co. Brisbane Ltd manufactured Queensland's famous "XXXX" beer and imported wine and spirits. The origins of the firm dated to 1871, when Michael Quinlan and N Donnelly entered into partnership as Quinlan, Donnelly and Co., general business and shipping agents, Brisbane. In late 1873 Donnelly relinquished his interest in the partnership and Quinlan continued to trade as Quinlan and Co. In 1874 the company's office and stores were re-located from Mary Street to Queen Street, opposite the Customs House and close to the new wharves being developed at Petrie Bight, establishing a long connection with the Petrie Bight district. Following Michael Quinlan's death in July 1878 his widow took control of the company and in August 1878 entered into partnership with George Wilkie Gray, the firm's principal manager, as Quinlan, Gray & Co.

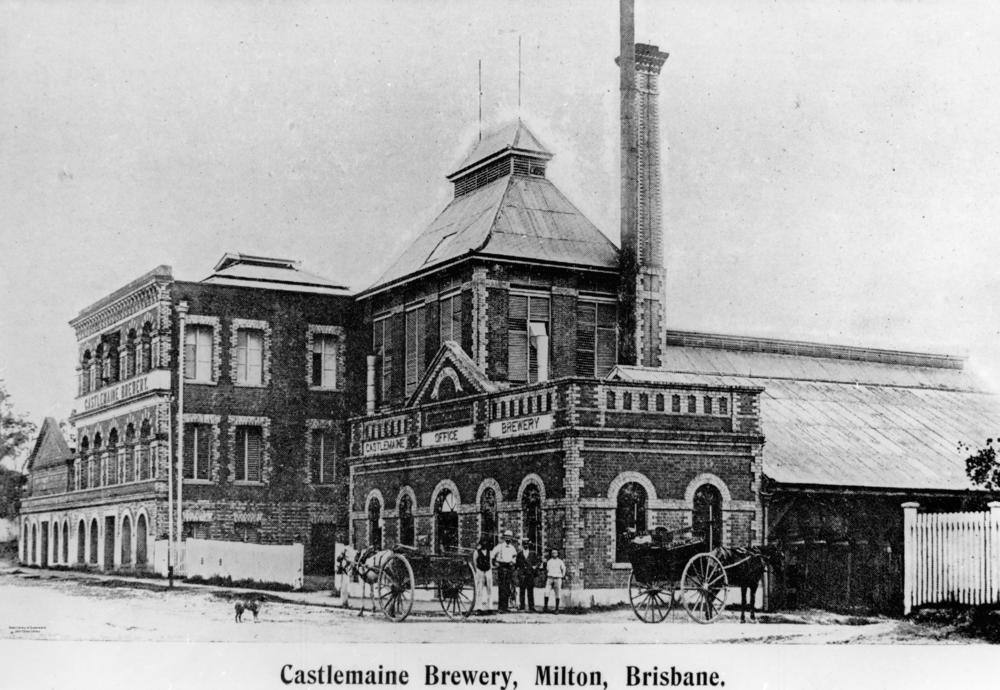
Castlemaine Brewery at Milton, circa 1901

Prior to Michael Quinlan's death the company had entered into negotiations with Edward and Nicholas Fitzgerald, owners of the Castlemaine Brewery in Victoria, to establish a brewery in Brisbane. In 1877 the firm of Fitzgerald, Quinlan & Co. was formed and the Queensland Distillery at Milton was acquired and developed as the Castlemaine Brewery. The first Castlemaine XXX Sparkling Ale was sold in late 1878. In 1887 The Castlemaine Brewery and Quinlan, Gray & Co. Brisbane Ltd was formed to acquire the assets of Fitzgerald, Quinlan & Co. (owners of the Castlemaine Brewery at Milton) and Quinlan, Gray & Co. (general merchants and importers). In addition to the brewing business the firm supplied wine, spirits, groceries and general merchandise to hotelkeepers, storekeepers, and graziers throughout Queensland.

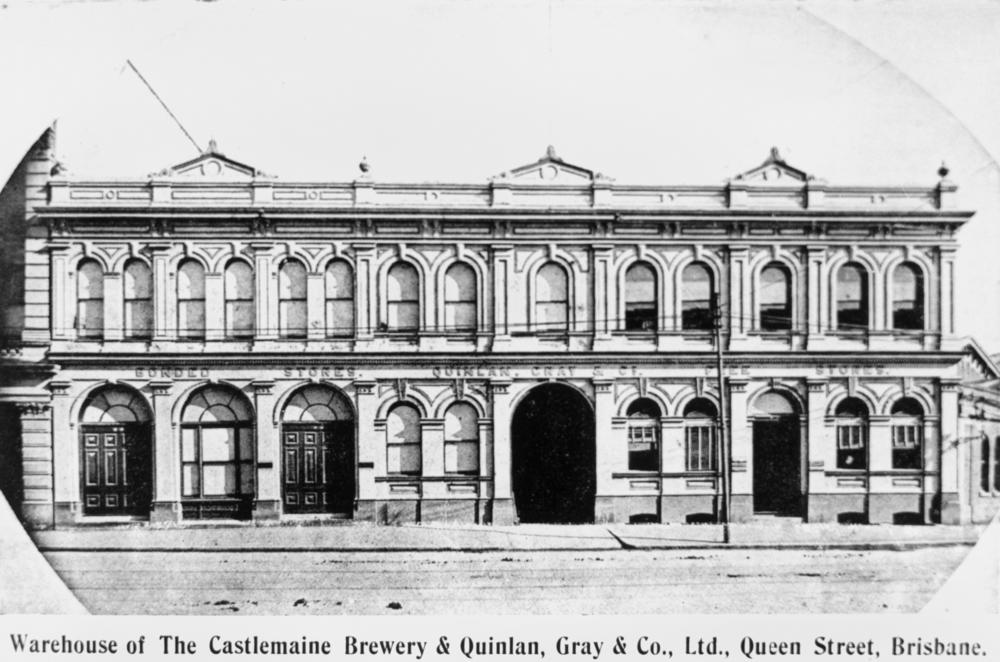
The company's Queen Street premises, circa 1900

The firm continued to occupy premises in Queen Street near the Customs House through the 1890s and early 1900s, and in 1901 also took up the lease of 385–391 Adelaide Street as a bond store. In 1909–1910 the company purchased two nearby allotments, at the corner of Adelaide Street and Clark Lane, with the object of constructing their own building on the site.

These allotments were part of a larger parcel of land bounded by Wharf, Adelaide and Ann streets alienated in 1853 by Dr William Hobbs. In the late 1870s the Brisbane Municipal Council formed the north-east end of Adelaide Street and in the process Adelaide Street was cut down in front of Dr Hobbs residence to better link with Queen Street at Petrie Bight. By 1881, when Dr Hobbs placed his property on the market, a right of way existed over what is now Clark Lane. In subsequent years much of Dr Hobbs' property was acquired for the St John's Cathedral precinct, and his former residence is now The Deanery at St John's.

The allotments at the corner of Adelaide Street and Clark Lane remained unimproved until George Bowser and George Montague Bowser (trading as George Bowser & Co., quarrymen, asphalters and general contractors), acquired title to the allotment adjoining Clark Lane in late 1899. Bowser & Co. were the proprietors of the Bowen Park Quarry opposite the Exhibition Grounds, supplying porphyry (Brisbane tuff) for both building and asphalting purposes, and appear to have been responsible for the construction of a two-storeyed stone warehouse at the corner of Clark Lane and Adelaide Street c. 1900. The hill was heavily cut into to accommodate this building but may have been partly excavated from the late 1870s when Dr Hobbs, in an attempt to create better access to his property after the cutting down of Adelaide Street, sold fill from his land to the Municipal Council for road works.

From October 1900 the Salvation Army held a five-year lease over Bowser & Co'.s building, which they conducted as a Workmen's Metropole providing low-cost temporary accommodation to itinerant working men. After the Salvation Army vacated this building it was occupied by various businesses, including the Queensland Motor Agency, WF Turk & Co. electrical engineers and machinery agents, and JW Walker, clothing manufacturer. In April 1909 title was transferred to The Castlemaine Brewery and Quinlan Gray & Co. Brisbane Limited, which also acquired title to the adjacent unimproved allotment in April 1910, providing the firm with a total of 52.6 perches (1,330 m^{2}) with a frontage of 99 feet (30 m) to Adelaide Street.

Work on construction of a new building had not commenced prior to World War I (1914–1918), which interrupted trade and had a detrimental impact on the company's activities. In 1916 the directors made three significant decisions: to withdraw from general importing and to specialise in brewing and in the distribution of wine and spirits; to introduce Castlemaine XXXX Sparkling Ale; and to proceed with the construction of the Adelaide Street building. Construction commenced about September 1918 and was completed in 1919 at a total cost of £22,950. The architect was TR Hall and the contractor GA Baumber, who was a shareholder in the company. The new structure more than doubled the footprint of the existing building on the site, necessitating further cutting into the rocky outcrop adjacent to St John's Deanery.

The new building was considered a "landmark". It was of three storeys, brick on a stone base, which could support construction of a further three storeys if required; a two-storeyed brick section at the rear also appears to have been erected at his time. The new building accommodated the firm's town office, a warehouse and a bond store, and in effect was the company's signature building. The main office was arranged on the "American "open" system" and was finished with Queensland timbers and tessellated floor tiles. On an upper floor a rest lounge with reading and cooking facilities was provided at the front of the building, overlooking Petrie's Bight, for the use of female staff members. A separate lunch room was provided for male staff, and another for the firm's travelling salesmen.

The architect for the project, Thomas Ramsay Hall, had established his practice in Brisbane in 1907. His larger commissions had included the Sandgate Town Hall (1911–1912), the McDonnell & East department store on George Street (1911–1913), and work for the Catholic Church. In 1919 he took into partnership his former articled pupil, George Gray Prentice, and in that year their design for the new Brisbane City Hall (opened 1930) was accepted.

In the interwar years The Castlemaine Brewery and Quinlan, Gray & Co. Brisbane Ltd expanded production significantly. The introduction of Castlemaine XXXX Bitter Ale in 1924 proved highly popular and became the basis for future brews; then in October 1928 the firm consolidated its position as a leading Queensland brewing company with the purchase of a controlling interest in Perkin's & Co. Ltd, acquiring the Toowoomba maltings and brewery (established in 1866), sections of the City Brewery plant, the trade of 19 freehold hotels for a period of 25 years, and the trade of 50 leasehold hotels until each lease expired. As a result of the acquisition/merger, the name of the firm was changed to Castlemaine Perkins Ltd; the former Perkins City Brewery in Mary Street was closed and some of the plant taken to the Castlemaine Brewery on Milton Road; an extensive program of refurbishment of the Milton and Toowoomba breweries was commenced; 418–420 Adelaide Street was retained as the company's head office; and a new brick and concrete bulk store was erected at the rear of the Adelaide Street building in 1928–1929, at a cost of around £8,000.

The new bulk store was designed by Brisbane architects Addison and Macdonald, who undertook most of Castlemaine Perkins' hotel refurbishments and brewery expansion work at this period. The principal contractor was GA Baumber, who had constructed the company's 1918–1919 building. The company's capital increased more than 13 times in the period 1919 to 1937. Despite the impact of the economic depression of the early 1930s, Castlemaine Perkins Ltd was able to consolidate its holdings, taking advantage of the slump in the property market to purchase further hotel freeholds and leaseholds.

After construction of bulk store in 1928–1929 further additions and alterations to 418–420 Adelaide Street were comparatively minor. Additional office fit-outs, designed by Addison and Macdonald, were made to the building c. 1930 and c. 1935. In 1961 additional offices were erected on the third floor and a passenger lift was installed.

418–420 Adelaide Street remained the head office of Castlemaine Perkins Ltd until the early 1980s when a new office was constructed at the Castlemaine Brewery at Milton, severing Quinlan, Gray & Co.'s connection of nearly 110 years with the Petrie Bight district. The Port of Brisbane had moved downstream and the Castlemaine Perkins building was one of many Petrie Bight warehouses that subsequently became redundant.

In 1980 Castlemaine Perkins Ltd and Tooheys Brewery in New South Wales merged to form Castlemaine Tooheys Ltd, which in turn was acquired by the Bond Corporation in 1985. Late in 1985 title to the former Castlemaine Perkins building at 418–420 Adelaide Street was transferred to film distributor Birch, Carroll & Coyle, which occupied the building as its Queensland headquarters until c. 2000.

== Description ==
The former Castlemaine Perkins Building, a substantial brick and stone warehouse and office building of the early twentieth century, is located at the corner of Adelaide Street and Clark Lane on the northern periphery of Brisbane's central business district. It occupies a rectangular site cut into the hill below the St John's Cathedral precinct.

The footprint of the building takes up most of the site, being constructed to the street alignments along Adelaide Street to the front and Clark Lane along the north-eastern side, and to the property boundary with Webber House at the rear. The south-western side is set back about one metre from the hill that rises to St John's Deanery to permit light and ventilation to the interior of the building. In plan the building sits about five metres from this side boundary. The front two-thirds of the building is three-storeyed with mostly load-bearing brick exterior walls resting on a substantial stone base, but incorporates elements of an earlier, two-storeyed stone warehouse (c. 1900) at the corner of Clark Lane and Adelaide Street. The stone structure extends about two-thirds the depth of the site, but less than half the width, with the side and rear walls surviving within the later structure. The two stages of the building (c. 1900 and 1918–1919) are delineated by separate gabled roofs, hidden behind a front brick parapet. These roofs are clad with corrugated metal sheeting. The north-east wall of the stone building, along Clark Lane, remains an exterior wall but has been rendered externally. A third floor in brick has been added to the stone structure.

The rear third of the site, where the land slopes up from Adelaide Street, is occupied by a two-storeyed brick and concrete section that appears to have been constructed in at least two stages (1918–1919 and 1928–1929). This has a gabled roof on the earliest section and a gambrel roof on the 1928–1929 section. Both roofs are clad with corrugated metal sheeting. The rear wall to the building may have been added as part of the 1928–1929 work.

The external south-west side wall is of unpainted, light-coloured mottled brick; the brickwork along the north-east side fronting Clark Lane has been painted; and the brickwork in the rear wall is of a light reddish unpainted brick.

The structure is unified by the 1918–1919 brick facade to Adelaide Street, designed in a free classical idiom. The face-brickwork in this front elevation is a mottled, deep red, broken by a rendered ashlar base with exaggerated keystones to the windows, a central vertical rendered ashlar bay and pediment, and a rendered cornice and parapet. The central pediment is decorated with a garland of vine leaves and bunches of grapes, symbolizing the business of the firm that commissioned the construction in 1918, and bears the date 1871 (the year in which Quinlan, Donnelly & Co. was formed). The original fenestration pattern remains intact. The lettering "Castlemaine Perkins Limited" can just be made out on the front parapet.

The interior of the building is divided into a centrally positioned public access space toward the front of the building; large open areas formerly used as offices (in part early open plan) and warehousing; and rear storage and dispatch areas. The detailing in the public areas, especially the joinery, demonstrates a high level of design and craftsmanship.

The centrally positioned entrance off Adelaide Street has a pair of painted, panelled timber doors opening directly from the street into a tiny entrance vestibule. This has a varnished, panelled timber ceiling and highly glazed early ceramic tiles lining the walls to door height. A fine varnished timber screen and double-leaf door with bevelled glass panels and carved timber wreaths separates the vestibule from the central foyer. Both sets of entrance doors have metal handles in Art Nouveau designs. Early marble steps lead up to a central foyer with later stone and tile flooring. Wide openings, one off each side of the foyer, have detailed timber architraves. The opening to the left leads up a couple of steps to the 1918 brick section; the opening at the right leads down a couple of steps, through a stone wall (formerly the south-west exterior wall of the c. 1900 building) to the earlier structure. The different floor levels reflect the slope of the land down toward the north-east corner of the site. At the end of the front foyer is the central public staircase, which accesses all three floors of the building. This has a well-detailed and crafted varnished timber balustrade with substantial timber newels.

Flooring throughout is of timber boards supported on a substantial framework of timber beams, joists and posts, all of which appear to be part of the 1918–1919 construction. The top floor is largely free of the internal timber posts that are a conspicuous feature of the lower levels. Here, the double-gabled timber roof structure is exposed. Ceilings throughout are unlined, exposing the floor framing to the spaces above.

On the ground and first floors there are recent openings in the stone wall that had previously divided the c. 1900 and 1918–1919 sections. Most of the stonework in this wall remains exposed; the side wall to Clark Lane and most of the rear wall of the c. 1900 building is rendered or painted. The interiors of all levels in the three-storeyed section are lit and ventilated via early windows in the front and side elevations. Window frames are mostly original, but there is later double glazing in the ground floor front windows to Adelaide Street.

Each floor of the three-storeyed section currently accommodates mostly open-plan offices. Some partition walls, exposed air conditioning ducts and an open staircase are later additions. Towards the rear of the stone building is a stairwell enclosing later steel stairs. An early brick elevator shaft is located towards the front of the building. Another elevator shaft appears to have been added at a later date. There is a concrete walk-in safe on the ground floor in the centre of the building, behind the front stairwell.

Due to the slope of the land the building becomes two-storeyed at the rear. Internal access to the ground floor of this section is via the first floor of the three-storeyed section. This rear area contains a two-storeyed brick building (1918–1919) along the south-west side of the site, extended in 1928–1929 in brick and concrete, to occupy the whole of the rear third of the site. The earlier section has a gabled roof clad with corrugated metal sheeting. The ground floor of this section retains a number of elements associated with its former function as a dispatch area - three large goods doors (two in timber and one of fire-proof steel construction) and front loading docks. Internally, concrete posts and steel beams supporting the floor above appear to be associated with the c. 1928 re-construction of the rear areas. Historical evidence suggests that the reconstruction involved an extension of the 1918 rear section to the rear boundary and removal of the upper level of its north-east brick side wall.

The loading area in front of the 1918 dispatch area is floored in concrete and enclosed with brick walls along the rear and side. Vehicle access is off Clark Lane. As in the earlier section, concrete posts and steel beams support the upper floor.

The upper levels of both rear sections now function as a single large open space. Walls in this space are exposed brick with a painted finish and floors have been lined with later sheeting. Ceilings are lined with a suspended ceiling system. Banks of steel-framed hopper windows remain, but in the rear wall have been bricked over externally.

In 2015, the building was being used as offices for architectural and interior design firm Arkhefield.

== Heritage listing ==
The former Castlemaine Perkins Building was listed on the Queensland Heritage Register on 6 March 2009 having satisfied the following criteria.

The place is important in demonstrating the evolution or pattern of Queensland's history.

This three-storeyed brick warehouse and office building, erected in 1918–1919 with a 1928–1929 addition and incorporating a c. 1900 two-storeyed stone building within its structure, is associated with a major Queensland twentieth century brewer and wine and spirits dealer: The Castlemaine Brewery and Quinlan, Gray & Co. Brisbane Ltd (Castlemaine Perkins Ltd from 1928). The location at the north-east end of Adelaide Street is important in demonstrating the development and consolidation of Petrie Bight as one of Queensland's principal warehousing and port districts prior to the move of the Port of Brisbane downstream.

The place is important in demonstrating the principal characteristics of a particular class of cultural places.

The former Castlemaine Perkins Building is a substantial, well designed, substantially intact early twentieth century warehouse and office building important in demonstrating the principal characteristics of its type. These characteristics include:

- the scale of the three-storeyed building, with a large two-storeyed section at the rear;
- the robust design and materials (including substantial hardwood posts, joists and roof structure);
- the clear division of the building into public areas, warehousing and despatch sections;
- the decorative facade to Adelaide Street, creating a strong and aesthetically pleasing street presence and designed to impress;
- the use of symbolism associated with the business of the firm for which the building was commission in 1918 (a garland of vine leaves and bunches of grapes in the central pediment);
- the use of detailed and finely crafted joinery in the public areas of the building (entrance vestibule, foyer, and front staircase);
- the provision of natural lighting and ventilation to each level via windows to both side and front elevations.

The building is important as an excellent example of the early work of Brisbane architect TR Hall prior to his joining GG Prentice in partnership in 1919. The designer has skilfully utilised a substantial earlier stone structure within the 1918 brick structure.

The place is important because of its aesthetic significance.

The building has aesthetic significance generated by the rhythm and detailing in the facade, including exaggerated keystones, decorative elements in the central bay and parapet, and the play of the brick against the render. Internally, the public spaces have finely detailed timber work.

The place has a special association with the life or work of a particular person, group or organisation of importance in Queensland's history.

The building at 418–420 Adelaide Street is closely associated with the work of The Castlemaine Brewery and Quinlan, Gray and Co. Brisbane Ltd (later Castlemaine Perkins Ltd), a major Queensland brewing company. Designed as the firm's signature building, the front elevation incorporates symbolic elements in the facade associated with the work of the company.
