= Southport, Queensland =

Southport
- Suburb
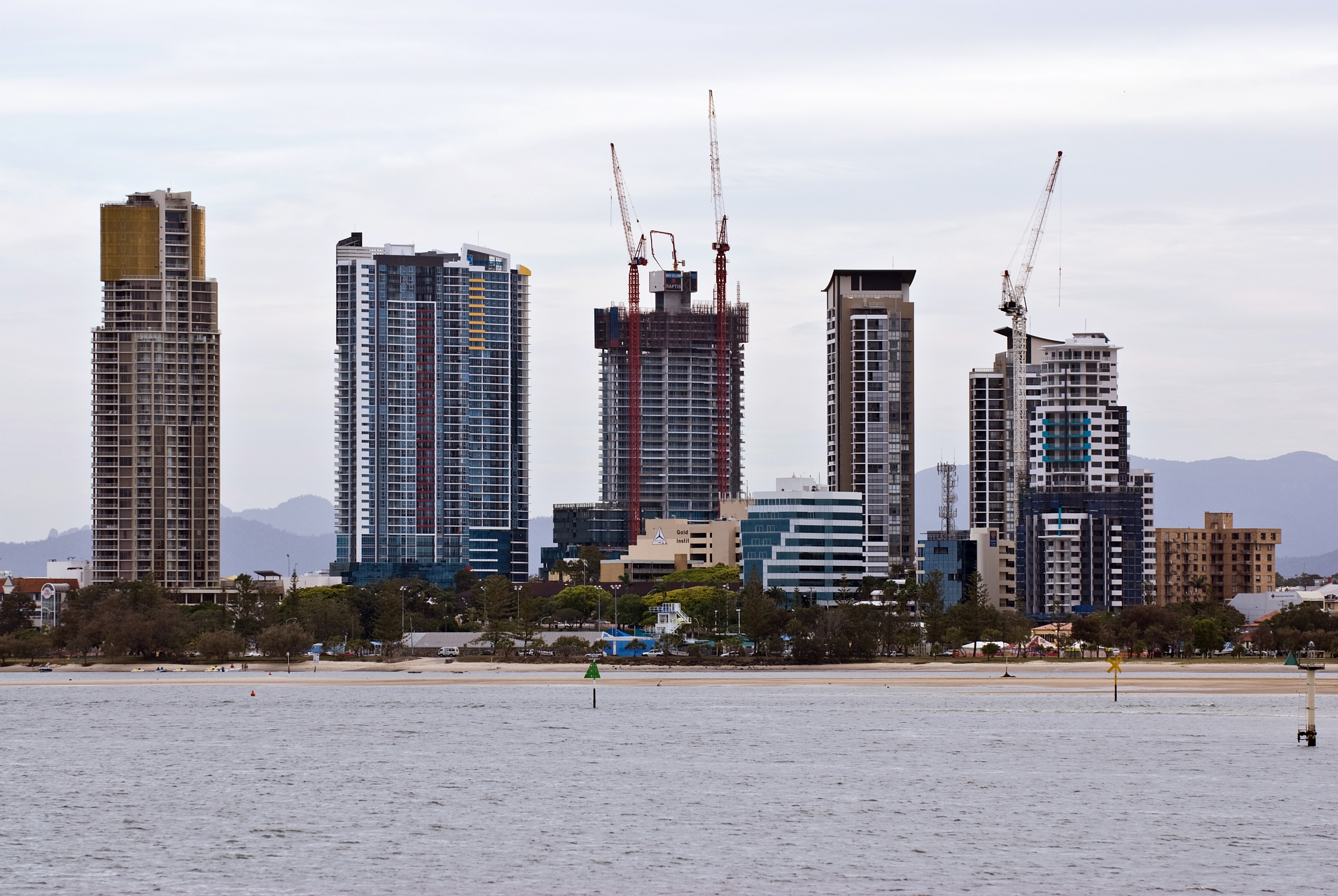
- The Gold Coast Broadwater commercial district c. 2008

- Interactive map of Southport
- Coordinates: 27.9678°S 153.4136°E
- Country: Australia
- State: Queensland
- City: Gold Coast
- LGA: City of Gold Coast
- Location: 4.2 km (2.6 mi) N of Surfers Paradise; 73.2 km (45.5 mi) SSE of Brisbane; 36 km (22 mi) N of Tweed Heads
- Established: 1874

Government
  - State electorates: Southport; Bonney
  - Federal division: Moncrieff

Area
  - Total: 15.6 km^{2} (6.0 sq mi)
- Elevation: 9 m (30 ft)

Population
  - Total: 36,786 (2021 census)
  - Density: 2,358/km^{2} (6,107/sq mi)
- Time zone: UTC+10:00 (AEST)
- Postcode: 4215
Suburbs around Southport
Arundel; Parkwood	Labrador	Main Beach
Molendinar	Southport	Main Beach
Ashmore	Bundall	Surfers Paradise

Southport is the most populous suburb in the City of Gold Coast in Queensland, Australia. It contains the Gold Coast central business district. In the 2021 census, Southport had a population of 36,786 people.

== Geography ==
Southport is bounded to the south-east by the Nerang River (27.9756°S 153.4225°E), where it flows into The Broadwater, the southernmost end of Moreton Bay, which then bounds the suburb to the north-east.

King Reach is a reach (27.985°S 153.4175°E) of the Nerang River. It was named in honour of Jeremy King (3 March 1935 – 13 October 2010) for his coaching, involvement and dedication to the sport of rowing within the Southport district. He was involved with rowing for over 50 years. It was gazetted on 28 November 2014.

Ray Newlyn Channel is a channel (27.9555°S 153.4177°E) in The Broadwater. It is an east-to-west channel across The Broadwater to Main Beach avoiding two large sandbanks. Raymond Paul (Ray) Newlyn was a Southport resident and a Commander in the Australian Volunteer Coast Guard Association; he died on 18 October 1997, it was gazetted on 11 January 2002.

Musgrave Hill is a neighbourhood (27.9605°S 153.3997°E) in western Southport. It was gazetted on 13 November 1982.

== History ==
Originally known as Nerang Creek Heads, it was named Southport because it was the southernmost port of the colony of Queensland.

A settlement was first surveyed in 1874 and the name Southport decided the following year. Southport was once the site of timber mills. A port was established to ship logs to Brisbane. Cutting timber opened up the area for settlement. Early rural industries included sugar growing and livestock grazing.

Southport Provisional School opened on 17 February 1880. On 1 July 1882, it became Southport State School.

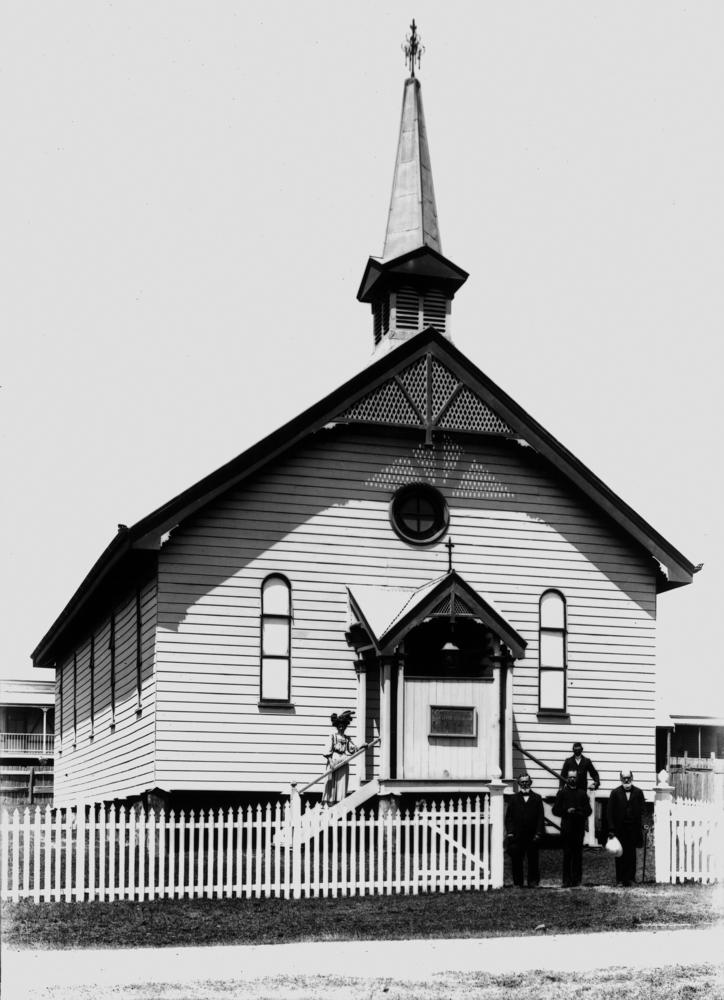
Congregational Church, 1910

In 1879, the first Congregational services were held in Southport in the home of J. C. Lather conducted by the Reverend J. Whiting who ministered in the Logan and Albert River districts. Land was purchased in Queen Street and a Congregational church was opened there on 9 October 1880. It was used for monthly Congregational services but was also available for use by other denominations. The first minister, Reverend A.R. Bailey was appointed in 1883. A manse was built in Bauer Street. J.B. Evans was the minister from late 1885, being replaced by J. G. Cribb in 1887. In 1888 a new Congregational Church was erected in White Street costing £530 and based on the designs prepared for the Milton Congregational Church in Brisbane. In 1899, the manse was relocated to behind the White Street church.

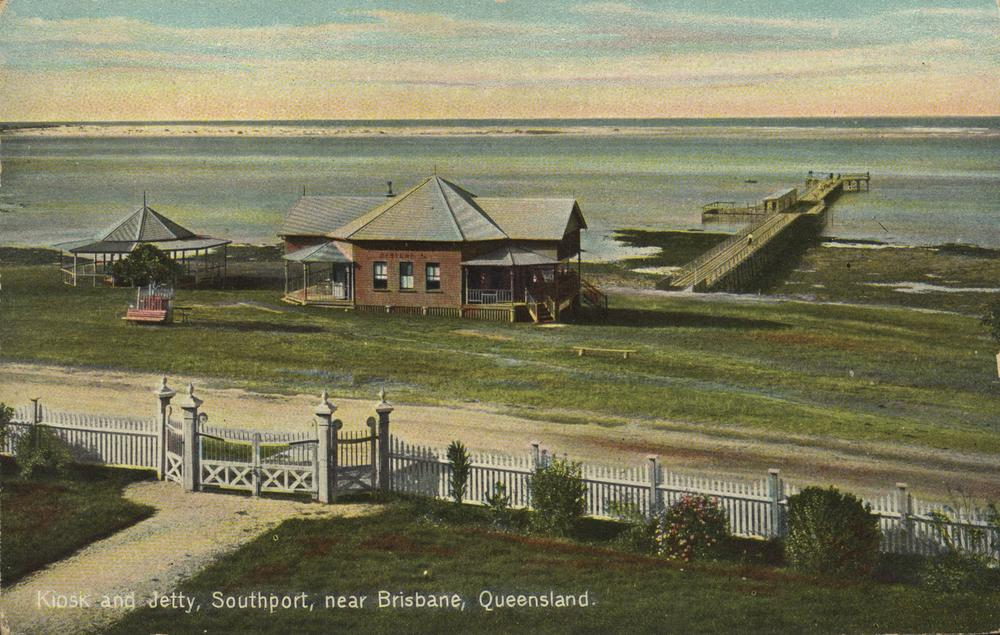
Kiosk and jetty at Southport in the early 1900s, the gates of the Star of the Sea Convent are in the foreground.

In 1883, the first Southport Pier was built to allow steamships to bring cargo and passengers to Southport. In the 1880s, Southport became the chosen site for the holiday residence of the Queensland Governor Sir Anthony Musgrave and his wife Lady Musgrave. Known as the Summer Place and still situated on the present day site of The Southport School, the choice of Southport as the preferred holiday destination for one of the most prominent couples in Queensland established the township as Queensland's pre-eminent seaside resort. Following the death of the governor in 1888, the Summer Place continued to be a holiday home for visitors to the area.

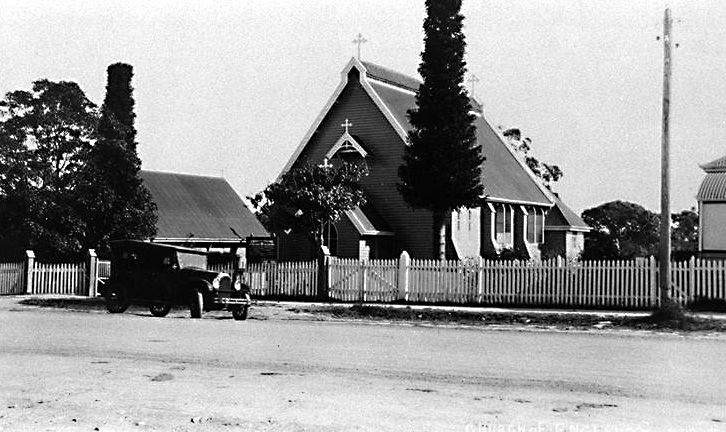
St Peters Church of England, 1900-1909

On Sunday 12 June 1887, Bishop William Webber officially opened St Peter's Anglican Church in Nerang Street on a site bequeathed to the church by Mr Pardoe. The plans for the church were supplied for free by architectal firm Banks and Carandini. However, a shortage of money prevented the design being fully built with many aspects incomplete at the time of the opening. The church was at 87 Nerang Street. Circa 1900, the church was enlarged. In 1959, a new brick church (the current church) was built, with the old church being relocated to Gilston and converted into a house.

In 1889, the South Coast railway from Beenleigh to Southport opened. The line was closed in 1964. After the arrival of the rail and prior to the construction of vehicular or pedestrian bridges across the Nerang River, a ferry service run by Johan Meyer ferried passengers to Main Beach, Queensland and a horse and buggy service linked the area to Surfers Paradise.

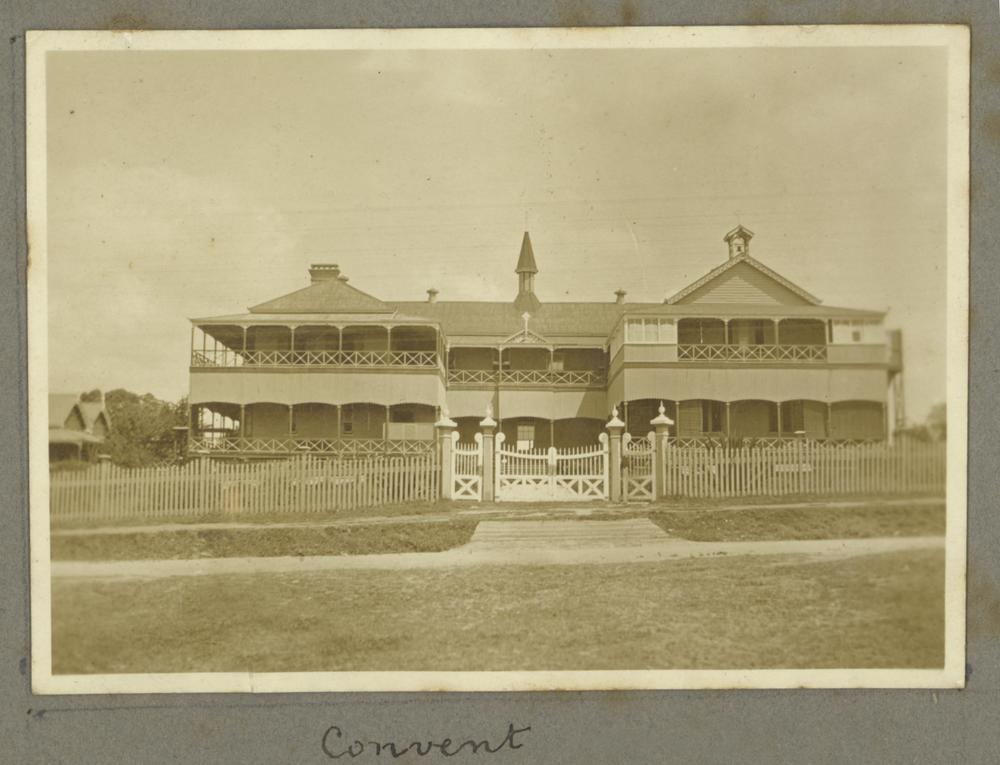
Star of the Sea Convent, circa 1922

In April 1900, the Roman Catholic Church purchased a parcel of land for a convent on Marine Parade opposite the pier (27.9655°S 153.4151°E). The Star of the Sea College opened as day school on 21 January 1901. Operated by the Sisters of Mercy, there were about 60 students enrolled on the opening day. In 1934, the school commenced offering secondary school education. The school closed at the end of 1990 with the girls transferring to Aquinas Catholic College (previously a boys-only school). The site was sold with buildings being demolished in 2016. The demolition unearthed a time capsule placed in March 1988 as part of the Australian bicentenary celebrations.

The Southport School opened in 1901. It established its military cadet program in 1906. It was once the largest boarding school in Queensland.

Guardian Angels' School opened on 1 January 1901.

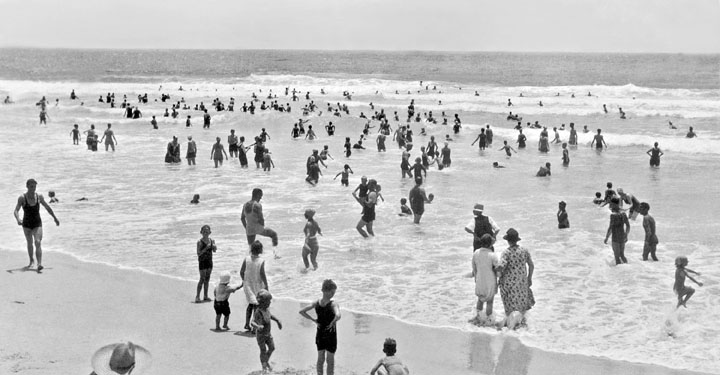
Bathing in 1930

By 1901 (Federation), Southport was well established as a tourist seaside spot with numerous accommodation options and a permanent population of 1,230. Tourism continued to expand in the first half of the 20th century with Southport maintaining its role as a seaside resort and a popular destination for day trippers and excursionists travelling from Brisbane.

St Hilda's School opened in 1912.

A concrete jetty was built in 1914 to replace the earlier structure. In 1927, the Pier Theatre which included a cafe and indoor golf course was built on the jetty. A fire destroyed the structure in 1932 but it was rebuilt and open to the public for nearly forty years.

In 1915, 163 allotments of "Pacific Ocean Estate" were advertised to be auctioned on 5 April 1915 (Easter Monday) by Newman and Dawber auctioneers. A map advertising the auction states the Estate was 2 miles from Southport Railway station, and near Southport High School.

The construction of the Jubilee Bridge in 1925 between Southport and Main Beach replaced the ferry service and facilitated further growth.

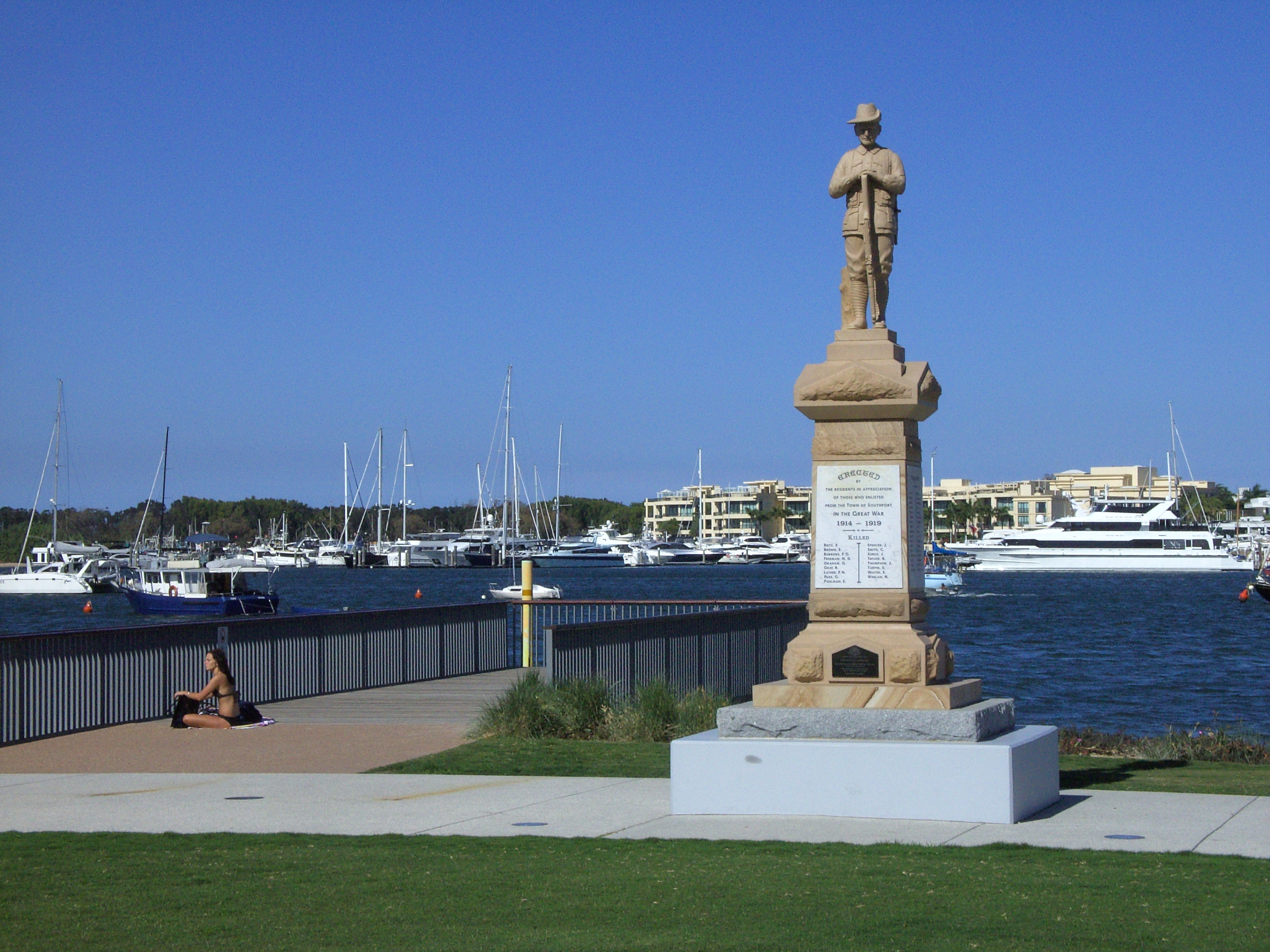
ANZAC memorial, 2011

On 25 April 1922 (ANZAC Day), Southport War Memorial located at the foot of Nerang Street was dedicated by the Member of the Queensland Legislative Assembly for Albert, John Appel, in the presence of many Southport people. In 2010, renovation of the parklands required the relocation of the memorial; it was re-dedicated on 11 November 2010.

In 1924, the Southport Surf Life Saving Club was established to protect swimmers at present-day Main Beach.

By the 1950s, Southport was the central entertainment location of the Gold Coast. It was also the administrative centre, with a central business district.

The 1954 Australian Grand Prix was held at the Southport Road Circuit on 7 November, using a circuit made up of public roads. The circuit was 5.7 miles in length, and there were two "no-passing" sections, where the road surface was too narrow for overtaking and too expensive to widen. The Grand Prix was won by Lex Davison in a HWM-Jaguar, ahead of Curly Brydon in an MG TC and Ken Richardson in a Ford V8 Special. Only two more meetings were held at the track – the Queensland Racing Car Championship in October 1955, and a motorcycle meeting in the same year.

Southport State High School opened on 24 January 1955. Prior to its opening, a secondary department had operated at Southport State School.

Circa 1958, All Saints' Anglican Church opened in the Chirn Park neighbourhood. Its closure on 2 November 1997 was approved by Assistant Bishop Williams. The church building was relocated to become the Anglican Church of the Good Shepherd in Mudgeeraba.

Gold Coast Opportunity School opened in 1962. It was replaced by the Southport Special School which opened on 1 January 1970. On 1 January 2003 it was The Kumbari Avenue School. On 19 September 2008 the name reverted to Southport Special School.

Musgrave Hill State School opened on 29 January 1963.

Aquinas Catholic College opened on 25 January 1964.

The Sundale Shopping Centre, which opened on 26 March 1969, was the first of its kind on the Gold Coast costing a record $7.5 million but closed in 1989 after the larger Australia Fair shopping centre opened nearby. It was located on 5 hectares (12 acres) of prime real estate facing the Broadwater which was previously the site of the popular Southport Hotel which was originally constructed in 1876. As well as providing panoramic views of the Nerang River from the upper floor, it was home to Queensland's first Big W department store as well as a cinema, restaurants, 45 speciality stores and a 7,000-vehicle car park. It was proposed as a location for the building of the Gold Coast Convention Centre. Such a development would have rejuvenated the old administrative centre of the Gold Coast. However, it lost its bid to Broadbeach, in part because of a lack of tourist accommodation in Southport. The site hosted weekly markets throughout the 1990s for several years after its closure, until its eventual demolition in 2003, at which time a time capsule was buried where the popular mall once stood. The area is now home to the Meriton Brighton on Broadwater development, a mix of high and low-rise buildings together with trendy eateries and some retail outlets. In more recent years another a time capsule was discovered on the Sundale site which was buried in 1969 when the mall was originally constructed. It was originally meant to be opened in the 2000s and was filled with notes and items which were meant to predict what the 21st century would be like. It is now located in the Gold Coast City Council Local Studies Library.

Keebra Park State High School opened on 30 January 1973.

Keebra Park Special School opened on 24 January 1983. It closed on 13 December 1991.

Bellevue Park State School opened on 24 January 1983. It is now within the neighbouring suburb of Ashmore.

Queensland Academy for Health Sciences opened on 1 January 2008.

In 2013, the business area of Southport was declared a priority development area, officially creating the Gold Coast central business district. In 2014, the Gold Coast City Council opened its own Chinatown in the Southport CBD.

A community of homeless people or "tent city" developed at Carey Park from 2023, and after eviction in May 2025 many people relocated to Eleanor Perkins Park. Police and council officers have since issued move-on notices to at least 10 individuals there.

== Demographics ==
In the 2016 census, Southport had a population of 31,908 people, 51.3% female and 48.7% male. The median/average age of the Southport population is 37 years of age, 1 year below the Australian average. 52.6% of people were born in Australia. The most common countries of birth were New Zealand 6.7%, China 4.1%, England 4.0%, South Korea 3.1% and Japan 1.9%. 65.9% of people only spoke English at home. Other languages spoken at home included Mandarin 4.9%, Korean 3.3%, Japanese 2.3%, Cantonese 1.1% and Arabic 0.9%. The most common responses for religion were No Religion 34.5% and Catholic 18.4%. Southport is a populous and ethnically diverse suburb. Its communities of Filipino Australians (624 people; 2.0%), French Australians (277 people; 0.9%); Polish Australians (205 people; 0.6%); Russian Australians (190 people; 0.6%), Croatian Australians (160 people; 0.5%), and Hungarian Australians (152 people; 0.5%) are the largest of any suburb in Queensland.

In the 2021 census, Southport had a population of 36,786 people.

== Economy ==
Southport is recognised as the central business district of the City of Gold Coast. It has the city's largest area of office space at 103,818 square metres (1,117,490 sq ft). In the past, Southport was the central entertainment location of the Gold Coast. In current times it is set apart from the normal tourist hub of the Gold Coast. However, it has still experienced tourist-driven development and extraordinary growth. Southport has 18 high-rise towers either completed, under construction or awaiting commencement.

== Landmarks and locations ==
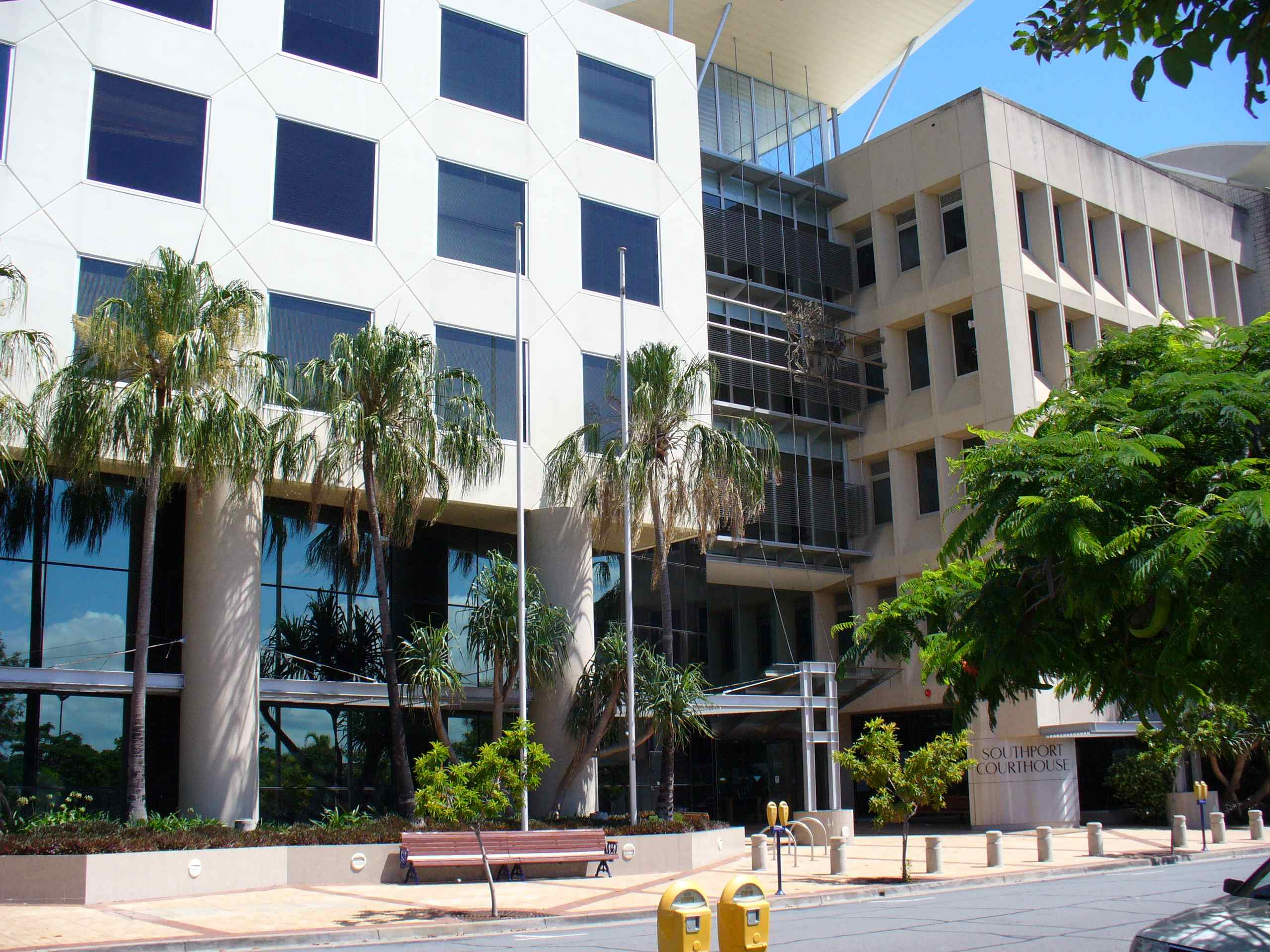
Southport Courthouse

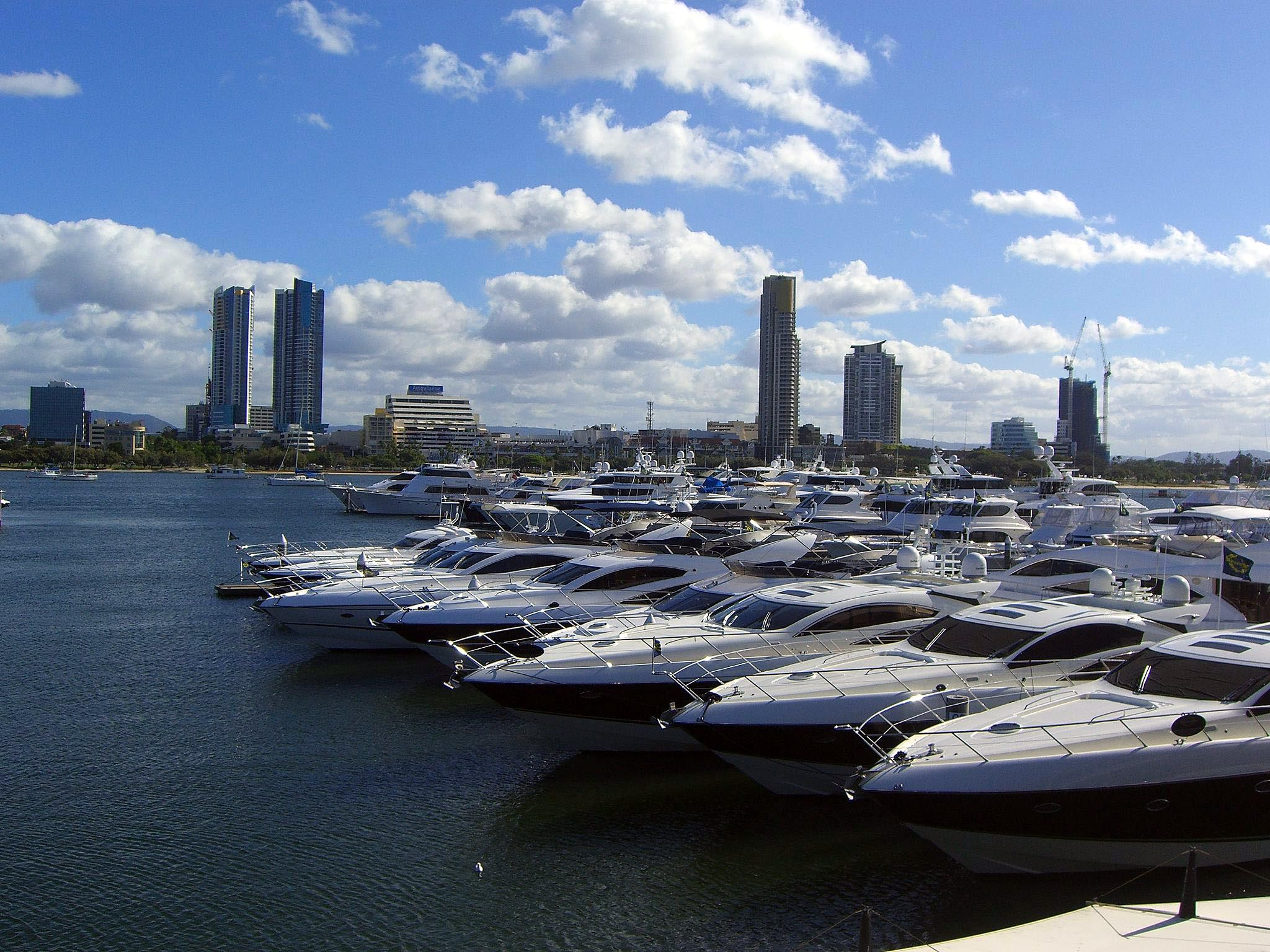
Gold Coast Broadwater marina with apartments in Southport

The body of water marking the eastern boundary of present-day Southport is known as the Gold Coast Broadwater. The Broadwater houses the Southport Yacht Club and a number of marinas on the southern bank of the Nerang River in an area now known as Main Beach. The area is used for fishing, boating, and watersports. Located opposite Southport on the far side of the Broadwater on The Spit, is the theme park Sea World. The Broadwater is suitable for swimming. The present day southern boundary of Southport is the Nerang River.

On the western side of the Broadwater, is the Southport Broadwater Parklands which opened in 2009 and has undergone subsequent expansions in 2013 and 2016. Within the Parklands precinct are the Southport Pier, Gold Coast Aquatic Centre and the Southport War Memorial. Overlooking the Parklands is Australia Fair.

Australia Fair is an indoor shopping centre spreading over Scarborough Street with frontages on Nerang Street and the Gold Coast Highway. Containing 233 stores and a cinema, it was established in 1983, initially on the site of the former milk factory and entirely on the site of the former Pacific Hotel, which was built in 1878, redesigned in 1927 and demolished in 1988 to make way for the expansion of the shopping complex.

The western end of Nerang Street in the vicinity of the intersection of Scarborough Street is also known as the Southport Mall. The re-opening of the mall (the old CBD, located adjacent to the shopping centre) to low-speed through traffic, after eight years of closure to vehicles, took place in 2000.

At the top of the mall, on the south western intersection of Scarborough and Nerang Streets, is the Art Deco styled Hotel Cecil which is considered an 'important anchor' in the streetscape. Opposite the hotel is a G:link station and, a few metres to the north, is the major northern bus interchange for the Gold Coast.

The City of Gold Coast Southport Branch Library is located on the Corner of Garden and Lawson Streets. It was previously located on the top floor of Australia Fair. The Southport Branch Library was completed in 2002 and is one of 14 branches of the city's library. Upstairs, in the same building, is the Local Studies Library which includes the city's historical collection of materials including documents, photographs, films, advertising and memorabilia.

Located on Nind Street, the Sata Nita building built in 1936 by Ralf Tennant Johnston, is now home to a funeral business. It was built as a bridal suite ahead of Ralf's marriage to his bride to be, Lila Hughes. Today it known as one of Southport's oldest and quirkiest buildings.

In April 2009, the three-tower Southport Central development was opened.

== Heritage listings ==
Southport has a number of heritage-listed sites, including:

- former Pacific Cable Station buildings, Dixon Drive within The Southport School
- Main Beach Pavilion and Southport Surf Lifesaving Club, off Macarthur Parade
- Southport Bathing Pavilion, Marine Parade
- Southport Sea Wall, Marine Parade
- ANZAC Park Memorial Gates, Marine Parade (Broadwater Parklands)
- Carey Park Fig and Paperbark Trees, Marine Parade (Carey Park)
- Southport War Memorial and Honour Rolls, Marine Parade (Southport Broadwater Parklands)
- former Southport Town Hall, Nerang Street
- Southport Drill Hall, 210 Queen Street (Owen Park)
- Southport State High School Buildings, 75 Smith Street

== Education ==
=== Primary only ===
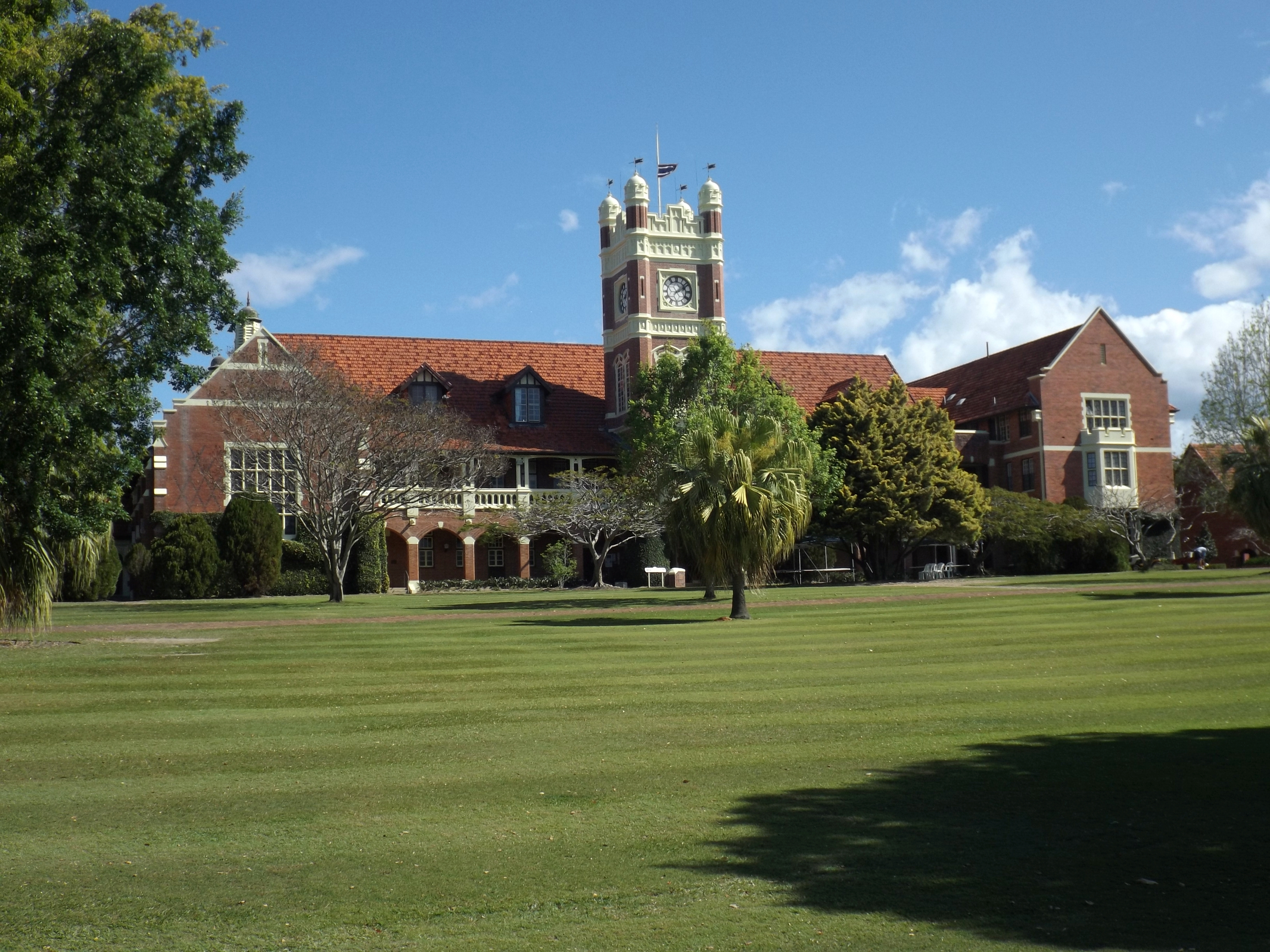
The Southport School clock tower

Southport State School is a government primary (Preparatory to Year 6) school for boys and girls at 215 Queen Street (27.9707°S 153.4007°E). In 2018, the school had an enrolment of 580 students with 47 teachers (42 full-time equivalent) and 22 non-teaching staff (15 full-time equivalent). It includes a special education program.

Musgrave Hill State School is a government primary (Early Childhood to Year 6) school for boys and girls at Nakina Street (27.9592°S 153.3937°E). In 2018, the school had an enrolment of 510 students with 45 teachers (39 full-time equivalent) and 44 non-teaching staff (32 full-time equivalent). It includes a special education program and an early childhood developmental program.

Guardian Angels' Catholic Primary School is a Catholic primary (Preparatory to Year 6) school for boys and girls at Edmund Rice Drive (27.9730°S 153.3841°E). In 2018, the school had an enrolment of 789 students with 52 teachers (44 full-time equivalent) and 36 non-teaching staff (26 full-time equivalent).

=== Primary and secondary ===
Southport Special School is a special primary and secondary (Preparatory to Year 12) school for boys and girls at Cnr Kumbari Avenue & Smith Street (27.9607°S 153.3951°E). In 2018, the school had an enrolment of 243 students with 67 teachers (61 full-time equivalent) and 83 non-teaching staff (51 full-time equivalent).

The Southport School is an Anglican primary and secondary (Preparatory to Year 12) school for boys at Winchester Street (27.9828°S 153.4145°E). In 2018, the school had an enrolment of 1,551 students with 132 teachers (126 full-time equivalent) and 103 non-teaching staff (86 full-time equivalent). The school has a well-known clock tower and chapel. It is also one of the few schools in Australia where cadet service is mandatory.

St Hilda's School is an Anglican primary and secondary (Preparatory to Year 12) school for girls at 52 High Street (27.9701°S 153.4072°E). In 2018, the school had an enrolment of 1,106 students with 103 teachers (99 full-time equivalent) and 86 non-teaching staff (79 full-time equivalent). It is the only all-girls school on the Gold Coast.

=== Secondary only ===
Southport State High School is a government secondary (7–12) school for boys and girls at 75 Smith Street (27.9628°S 153.4024°E). In 2018, the school had an enrolment of 1,798 students with 130 teachers (126 full-time equivalent) and 56 non-teaching staff (46 full-time equivalent). It includes a special education program.

Keebra Park State High School is a government secondary (7–12) school for boys and girls at Anne Street (27.9847°S 153.3993°E). In 2018, the school had an enrolment of 803 students with 78 teachers (75 full-time equivalent) and 39 non-teaching staff (30 full-time equivalent). It includes a special education program and an intensive English language program.

Aquinas College is a Catholic secondary (7–12) school for boys and girls at Edmund Rice Drive (27.9759°S 153.3826°E). In 2018, the school had an enrolment of 1045 students with 92 teachers (88 full-time equivalent) and 45 non-teaching staff (36 full-time equivalent).

Southport Flexible Learning Centre is a Catholic secondary (7–12) school for boys and girls at 2 Nakina Street (27.9603°S 153.3936°E). In 2018, the school had an enrolment of 59 students with 6 teachers (5 full-time equivalent) and 11 non-teaching staff (6 full-time equivalent).

Queensland Academy for Health Sciences is a government secondary selective-entry (10–12) school for boys and girls at 102 Edmund Rice Drive (27.9671°S 153.3829°E). In 2018, the school had an enrolment of 331 students with 32 teachers (30 full-time equivalent) and 19 non-teaching staff (15 full-time equivalent).

== Precincts ==
=== Chinatown Gold Coast ===
Chinatown, Gold Coast The $6.8 million Chinatown precinct is being developed in partnership with the community, private sector and government.

=== Gold Coast Aquatic Centre ===
The Gold Coast Aquatic Centre is located on Marine Parade adjacent to Southport Broadwater. It has a 50-metre Olympic pool with diving towers, 33- and 25-metre pools and a 15-metre indoor teaching pool. These pools are heated. There is a children's aquatic playground which includes a wading pool.

=== Southport Broadwater Parklands ===
There is a major park located along the shore of the Southport Broadwater. The state government has allocated A$16M with matched funding from Gold Coast City Council (over $32 million in total), to invest into the parklands. The works will include building a pier along the Southport Mall alignment. The park will be known as Broadwater Park.

=== Health and Knowledge ===
Located on the eastern edge of the suburb is home to the Gold Coast's health and knowledge precinct. Griffith University, Gold Coast Campus is home to over 18,200 students and offers student living accommodation. Griffith University is the city's largest University. Located across the road is the Gold Coast University Hospital (GCUH). GCUH is a large 800 bed teaching hospital that opened in 2013.

=== Southport General Cemetery ===
The 4.2-hectare Southport General Cemetery was gazetted on 16 July 1880. It is controlled by Gold Coast City Council as trustee. The cemetery is located on Queen Street which was the original route to Southport. This route led to the earliest wharf at Broadwater. Lantern Ghost Tours Gold Coast run historical night tours weekly through the Southport General Cemetery

== Community facilities ==
Southport has a number of churches, including:

- St Peter's Anglican Church, 93 Nerang Street
- Guardian Angels' Catholic Church, 99 Scarborough Street
- Southport Uniting Church, 23 Short Street
- Crosslife Baptist Church, 170 Nerang Street
- Southport Church of Christ, 1 Griffith Way
- Christadelphian Ecclesia Southport, 84 Falconer Street
- South Korean Presbyterian Church of Gold Coast, 7 Deakin Avenue

The Southport branch of the Queensland Country Women's Association meets at 20 Young Street.

The Southport Community Centre recently constructed offers a range of activities, services, classes and is located in the Southport CBD precinct.

Despite the name, the Southport Surf Life Saving Club is not in the suburb of Southport but is now within the suburb of Main Beach.

== Nature ==
Habitats for native mammals include large trees with or without hollows, fallen logs, leaf litter and understorey vegetation. These provide food, shelter and places for breeding. Southport is a place for picnics, riverside walks and birdwatching in the Broadwater Parklands.

== Climate ==
Southport experiences a humid subtropical climate (Köppen climate classification Cfa) with humid, wet summers and mild to warm winters, though at times with cool nights.

Climate data for Southport, Queensland
Month	Jan	Feb	Mar	Apr	May	Jun	Jul	Aug	Sep	Oct	Nov	Dec	Year
Record high °C (°F)	39.0 (102.2)	36.7 (98.1)	36.1 (97.0)	35.0 (95.0)	31.7 (89.1)	27.6 (81.7)	28.9 (84.0)	28.3 (82.9)	33.2 (91.8)	39.4 (102.9)	42.2 (108.0)	38.3 (100.9)	42.2 (108.0)
Mean daily maximum °C (°F)	28.5 (83.3)	28.3 (82.9)	27.6 (81.7)	25.9 (78.6)	23.3 (73.9)	21.2 (70.2)	20.6 (69.1)	21.4 (70.5)	23.3 (73.9)	25.2 (77.4)	26.7 (80.1)	28.1 (82.6)	25.0 (77.0)
Mean daily minimum °C (°F)	20.3 (68.5)	20.5 (68.9)	19.2 (66.6)	16.5 (61.7)	13.4 (56.1)	10.6 (51.1)	9.1 (48.4)	9.8 (49.6)	12.1 (53.8)	15.0 (59.0)	17.4 (63.3)	19.2 (66.6)	15.3 (59.5)
Record low °C (°F)	14.4 (57.9)	15.0 (59.0)	8.3 (46.9)	8.9 (48.0)	3.3 (37.9)	0.6 (33.1)	−3.9 (25.0)	0.6 (33.1)	2.8 (37.0)	5.5 (41.9)	8.0 (46.4)	5.6 (42.1)	−3.9 (25.0)
Average rainfall mm (inches)	181.2 (7.13)	193.1 (7.60)	198.9 (7.83)	137.6 (5.42)	128.7 (5.07)	98.2 (3.87)	72.4 (2.85)	56.9 (2.24)	57.1 (2.25)	87.8 (3.46)	105.8 (4.17)	137.2 (5.40)	1,454.9 (57.28)
Average rainy days	12.7	13.5	15.1	11.5	9.9	7.9	7.0	6.7	7.3	8.9	9.9	11.4	121.8
Source: Bureau of Meteorology

== Culture ==
- Gold Coast Art Festival

== Sport and recreation ==
A number of sporting teams represent the local area, including the Southport Leagues Club, Southport Gymnastic Club, Southport Tigers, Southport Soccer Club, Southport Surf Life Saving Club and the Southport Sharks.

== Transport ==
Southport has numerous main roads that connect Southport with other suburbs. Gold Coast Highway travels the full length along the coast on the Gold Coast connecting Southport with all the coastal suburbs on the city. Smith Street Motorway is a motorway grade extension of smith street connecting the suburb to the Pacific Motorway that connects the city to Brisbane.

Southport is also well serviced by public transport. A light rail system called G:link opened in July 2014 and ran between Broadbeach to Gold Coast University Hospital. In December 2017 G:link was extended to Helensvale. There are seven light rail stations in the suburb, connecting Southport with the major hubs of Surfers Paradise and Broadbeach. There are two major bus stations – Southport and GCUH. The Southport bus station is located in the heart of the suburb on Scarborough Street which provides regular and high frequency services to mainly the northern suburbs. GCUH bus station is situated on the western part of Southport, servicing Gold Coast University Hospital and the northern part of the Griffith University, Gold Coast campus. All services are part of the Translink integrated fare system.

An extension to the light rail system was announced in October 2015. Its intention was to operate from the previous terminus at Gold Coast University Hospital to Helensvale railway station. The extension opened ahead of schedule on 17 December 2017, months before the 2018 Commonwealth Games. Helensvale is the suburb's nearest railway station, located 11 kilometres (6.8 mi) from the Southport CBD. The railway line provides a connection to Brisbane city and Brisbane Airport. The Light Rail extension to Helensvale now operates integrally with the University Hospital to Broadbeach South line, with connections at Helensvale to Brisbane (Roma Street).

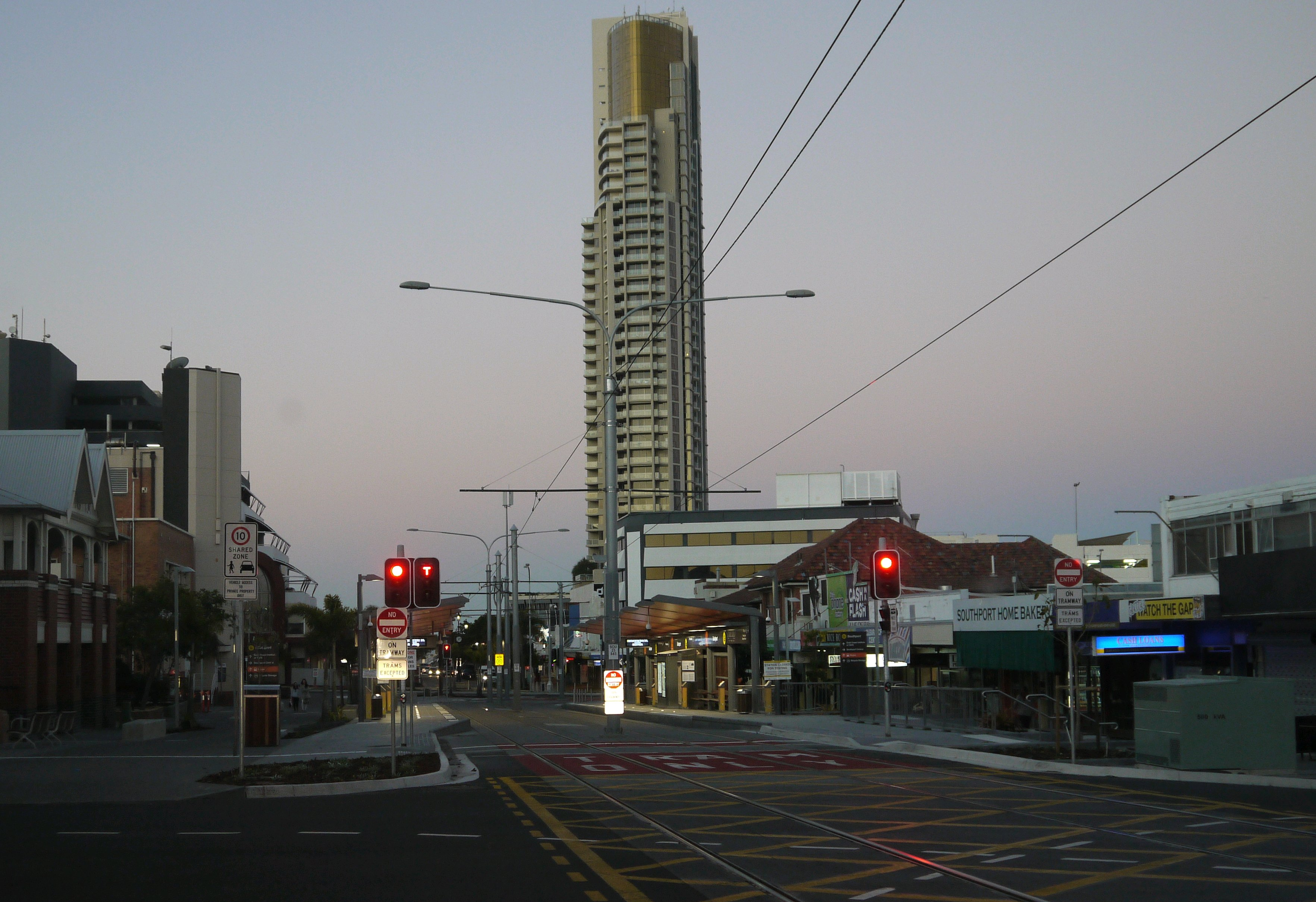
Southport G:link Station located in the heart of the CBD

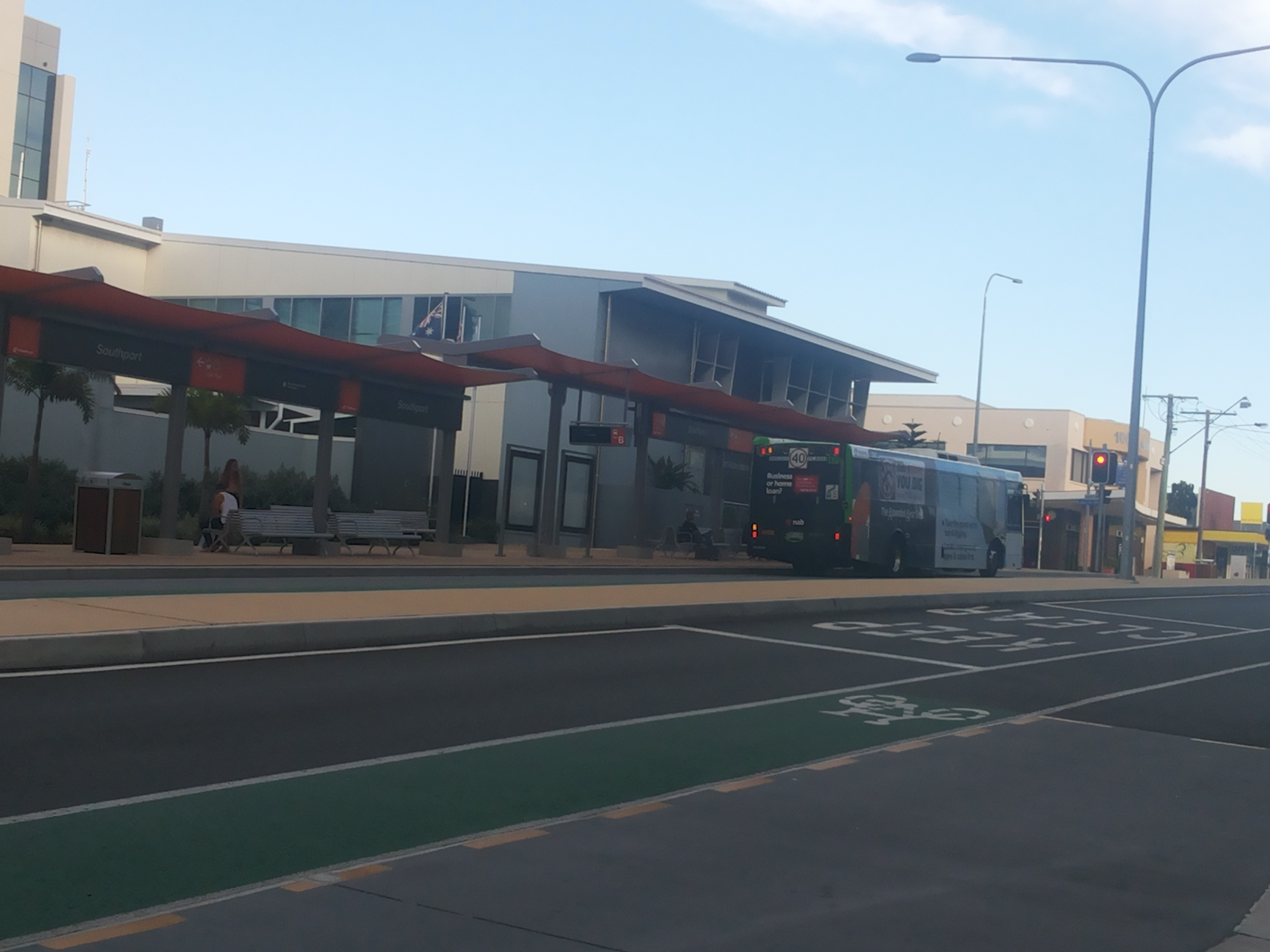
The Southport bus station, located next to the Southport G:link station, together acting as the main transportation hub for the CBD

== Notable residents ==
- David Dodd (born 1985), association footballer who played for Brisbane Roar
- Ben Edmondson (born 1978), cricketer
- Georgia Godwin (born 1997), artistic gymnast
- Grant Hackett (born 1980), swimmer
- Laurence Naismith (1908–1992), English-born actor, died in Southport 1992.
- Mitch Nichols (born 1989), association footballer for Perth Glory in the A-League
- Tommy Oar (born 1991), association footballer playing for FC Utrecht
- James O'Connor (born 1990), rugby union footballer, Wallabies
- Nick Riewoldt (born 1982), Australian rules footballer with St Kilda.
- Ruth Sanger (1918–2001), expert on blood groups, was born in Southport
- John Sattler (1942–2023), rugby league player
- Casey Stoner (born 1985), motorcycle racer, 2007 and 2011 MotoGP World Champion, was born in Southport
- Jai Taurima (born 1972), long jump athlete
- Jim Wilson (born 1967), journalist and radio host

== See also ==
- List of Gold Coast suburbs
