= Southport Town Hall, Queensland =

Southport Town Hall
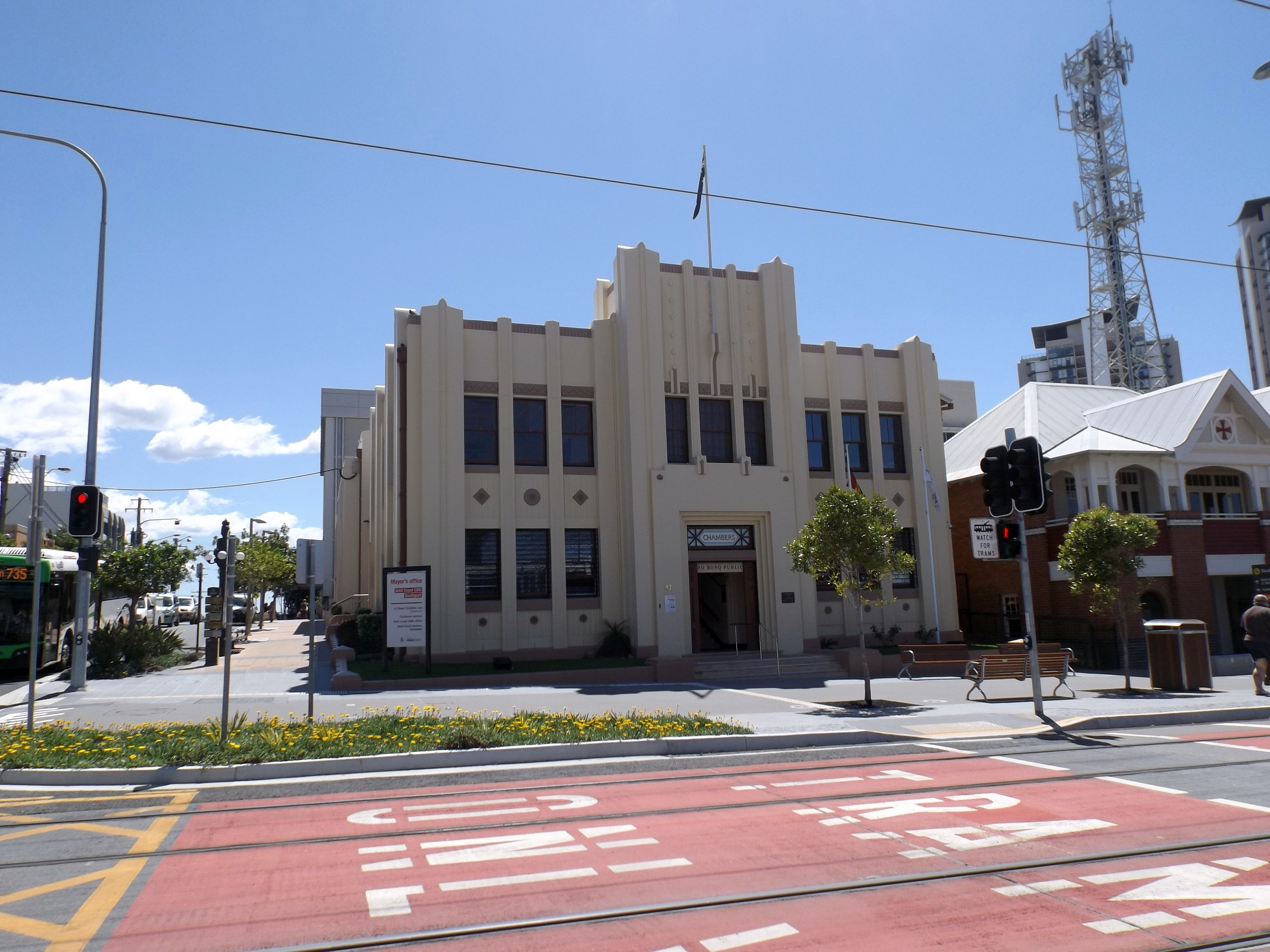
- Building in 2015

- Location within Queensland Location within Australia
- 27.9677°S 153.413°E
- Location: Nerang Street, Southport, Gold Coast City, Queensland, Australia

History
- Design period: 1919–1930s (interwar period)
- Built: 1935
- Built for: Southport Town Council

Site notes
- Architect: Hall & Phillips

Queensland Heritage Register
- Official name: Southport Town Hall (former), Gold Coast City Hall, Gold Coast Town Hall, South Coast Town Hall
- Type: state heritage (landscape, built)
- Designated: 5 October 1998
- Reference no.: 601649
- Significant period: 1930s–1940s (historical); 1935–ongoing (social); 1930s (fabric)
- Significant components: counter, lawn/s, council chamber/meeting room, foyer – entrance, furniture/fittings, views to, office/s
- Builders: H Cheetham

Southport Town Hall is a heritage-listed former town hall at Nerang Street, Southport, Gold Coast City, Queensland, Australia. It was designed by Hall & Phillips and built in 1935 by H Cheetham. It is also known as Gold Coast City Hall, Gold Coast Town Hall, and South Coast Town Hall. It was added to the Queensland Heritage Register on 5 October 1998.

== History ==
The Southport Town Hall was constructed in 1935 on the corner of Davenport and Nerang Streets, by the Southport Town Council replacing an earlier timber structure built in the nineteenth century. The building was designed by prominent Brisbane architects, Hall and Phillips, and is one of a number of buildings designed by the partnership which demonstrate a strong Art Deco influence.

The Nerang Division was formed in the nineteenth century to provide local government for the emerging community at the southern end of coastal Queensland. In 1883 Southport received separate local government representation when the Southport Divisional Board was formed. In the 1880s the popularity of Southport as a seaside holiday destination surged. Southport developed as an alternate resort when Sandgate became more accessible with the introduction of the Sandgate rail line in 1882. Logging in the Southport area had commenced in the late 1850s, and by 1875 the first sales of land opened the area for settlement. By the 1880s major Brisbane families favoured Southport as the principal sea-side area. The construction of major schools, banks and hotels stimulated Southport's growth the premier nineteenth century resort as did the presence of the Governor's residence in the 1890s. The South Coast railway line, an extension from Beenleigh to Southport was opened in 1889 making Southport more accessible from Brisbane.

A Town Council Chamber was constructed for the Southport Divisional Board at the corner of Nerang and Davenport Streets in 1899, prior to which the Board met at the court house. The Divisional Board continued to meet in this building until the 1930s when it was decided that a new chambers would reflect the increased size and popularity of Southport. The 1930s were a time of considerable growth and an important time in the development of Southport. In fact, there was rapid growth in coastal regions throughout Queensland during this period as bathing in sea water became increasingly popular as a recreational pursuit. As well, by this time the majority of the general population benefited from paid holiday leave, increasing leisure time and the opportunities for extended holidays. Councils of various coastal regions were competing for holiday trade by instigating beautification schemes and programmes for the provision of public facilities on the beaches.

The Southport Town Council, formed in 1915 from the Southport Divisional Board, undertook such an improvement scheme, taking advantage of the Queensland Government's employment relief programme, which saw low interest loans provided to local councils for capital works. As part of this bathing pavilions, a surf lifesaving clubhouse, beach reclamation and the construction of the council chambers were planned. Included in the money borrowed by the Southport Council was £3000 for the construction of a new council chambers, to reflect the prosperity and progressiveness of the council.

To design the council chambers the Town Council acquired the services of Brisbane architectural partnership, Hall and Phillips. Hall and Phillips were a Brisbane architectural partnership, formed in 1929, when Lionel Blythewood Phillips was admitted into partnership with Thomas Ramsay Hall, formerly of Hall and Prentice, who designed the Brisbane City Hall and Ascot Chambers. Hall and Phillips continued in practice until 1948. TR Hall lived at Southport during this period and the firm was commissioned by the Southport Town Council for a number of projects in the 1920s and 1930s, including the Main Beach Pavilion and Southport Bathing Pavilion (1934); and the Southport Surf Lifesaving Club (1936). Other work by Hall and Phillips at the south coast include the Pier Theatre (1926); Pacific Hotel, Southport (1926); Tyley's Shoe Store, 80 Scarborough Street, Southport (1932); Woolworths, 30 Scarborough Street, Southport (1940); and seaside homes for James Cavill, JB Charlton, TJ Barry and RG Clarke along with various business premises and accommodation units.

The design prepared by TR Hall, on behalf of Hall and Phillips, for the new Southport Town Hall was clearly inspired by the fashionable artistic and architectural style, Art Deco. Named as a style following a 1925 exhibition in Paris, Exposition Internationale des Arts Decoratifs et Industriels Modernes, Art Deco refers more to pastiche qualities rather than a more integral architectural style. Hall and Phillips were the main proponents of Art Deco inspired architecture in Brisbane although this was certainly not the only influence on their vast work. Many of their prominent works displaying this influence include the dining room extension to the Tattersall's Club, Queen Street; McWhirters' corner, Fortitude Valley; Shell House, Ann Street; Stewarts and Lloyds Factory (now Australian Consolidated Industries), Montague Road, West End as well as the Southport Town Hall. Art Deco diverged from the aesthetic purity of modernism, reintroducing surface ornamentation and polychromy and with a theatricality which served as a "middle-brow bridge between modernism and consumerism". Art Deco was little used as a three dimension architectural style, more often applied as a two dimension ornament to the facades and interiors of mostly, commercial buildings and apartment buildings. Elements of the style include polychrome ornamentation commonly combining geometrical shapes particularly chevrons and repeated lines, and stylised floral patterns. Usually such ornamentation was concentrated around entrances and at the parapet line and is juxtaposed with more general ornamentation, like faceting, fins and chevron mouldings creating three dimensional crystalline surfaces.

The Southport Town Council were influenced by the architects to adopt a popular inter war style reflecting the anticipated prosperity and development of the south coast and specifically, Southport. Originally the building was designed to incorporate a central tower, but this was omitted from the final work for financial reasons. Tenders were called for the building in late 1934 and by January, 1935 the tender of Brisbane builder, H Cheetham was accepted as noted in the Architects' and Builders' Journal of Queensland. Construction began on the building on 11 January 1935 and the new Town Hall was expected to be completed at a cost of £5970. The first part of the construction process involved removing the original council chambers and transferring this to another part of Southport where it remained in use as the council chambers until construction was completed on the new Town Hall.

The building was finished by August 1935 and on 2 August 1935 the Southport Town Hall was officially opened by the Queensland Premier, William Forgan-Smith in commemoration of the employment relief loan the Southport Town Council received from the Queensland Government in order to construct the building. When opened, the building provided four offices on the ground floor, three of which were to be let and one of which would house a state funded baby clinic. The upper floor provided office accommodation for the Mayor and Town Clerk of Southport and a council chamber. The painting on the project was done by Dyne and Co. under the supervision of Messrs James and Frank Holden. The plumber involved with construction was JW Parker and the electrician was JR Ritchie.

Both the local press in the form of the South Coast Bulletin, and the Architects' and Builders' Journal of Queensland reported on the completed building, which was described as "an interesting study in modern architectural design" and a building which "add(ed) a new type of architecture to the town." More specifically one of the reports detailed the building:

"The centre which has the main entrance is bold in treatment and is supported by symmetrical wings. The main motif is of vertical line, with horizontal treatment between the main piers...It is constructed of brickwork walls, concrete ground floor, wood first floor and fibrolite roof. All external walls are cavity brickwork preserving the coolness of the building and preventing dampness and as a further precaution the walls have been cement rendered. The ground floor has an entrance vestibule and hall stair lobby giving access to four large well lighted offices, which at present are to be rented but will provide extra space if required by the council...The council's offices are on the first floor where a generous public space provides approach to a general office and water authority business being conducted across a silky oak counter. Access to the mayor's room, health office and town clerk's office is direct from the public space. A staircase at the back leads to the yard. The council chamber (31 feet by 19 feet) is an imposing room with textured walls, silky oak furniture and honour board. The (un)usual splay steeped ceiling of fibrous plaster is a distinctive feature. Provision is made for a small public gallery to the chamber and adjoining the chamber is a committee room."

The Southport Town Council moved into their new Town Hall and remained in the building until the Southport Town Council was amalgamated with other south coast councils to form the South Coast Town Council in 1949. The new amalgamated council used the former Southport Town Hall as their council chambers and a large addition to the rear of the building was made in 1952 to house additional offices. The extension was well designed to allow the 1936 building to retain its form and scale. In 1955 a metal framed and glazed porch was added to the Nerang Street entrance to the 1935 building. As well windows were removed from the front facade and a ground floor men's toilet was relocated. The South Coast Town Council was renamed the Gold Coast Town Council in 1958 and, having reached the level of municipality, the council was renamed the Gold Coast City Council in 1959. The Gold Coast City Council remained at the former Southport Town Hall until 1976 when new offices at Evandale were constructed. From that time the building has been used as the Southport branch of the council.

In 1997 a large scale conservation project was undertaken by the Southport branch of the City Council designed by Inarc Architects with Arnold Wolthers Architect providing heritage advice. The project involved the removal of the 1955 front porch; the reinstatement of ground floor windows and doors, internal reconstruction and the reconstruction of external decoration. During this work many of the original features, including the front doors, lettering over the front entrance and internal features were revealed.

== Description ==
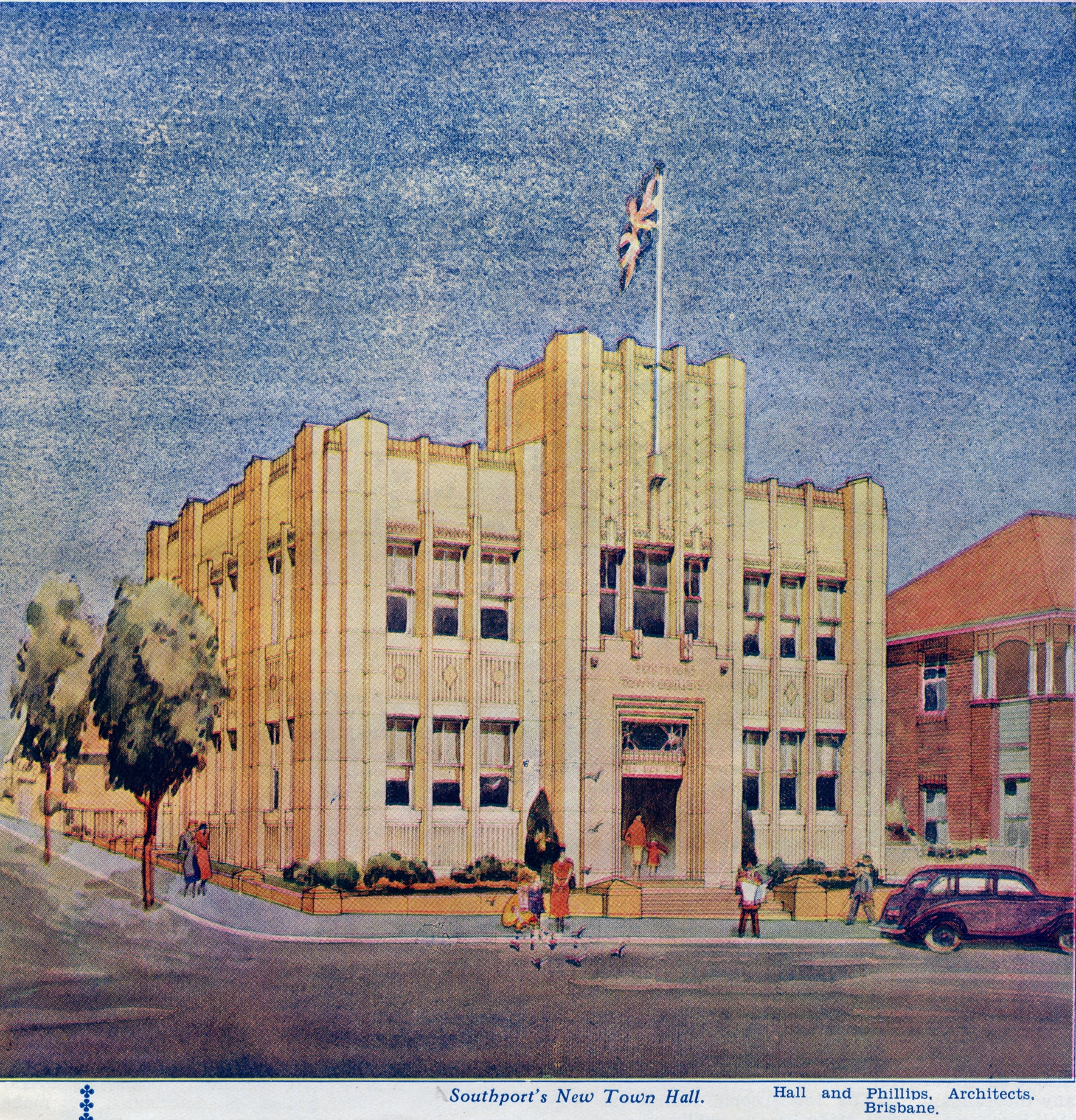
Southport Town Hall, 1935

The former Southport Town Hall is a two storeyed rendered brick and concrete building situated on the corner of Nerang and Davenport Streets, Southport. The front facade of the building is set back from the Nerang Street footpath, allowing for a small lawned entrance court.

The symmetrically composed building comprises a central entrance bay on the Nerang Street facade, flanked by side wings. The Davenport Street facade of the building is three bays deep, each of these bays similar in form, although narrower, than those flanking the central entrance bay. The corrugated fibrous cement clad roof is concealed by a parapet on the principal facades of the building. The building is constructed with cavity brick load bearing external walls, rendered with cement externally and with plaster internally. A concrete slab forms the ground floor and the first floor is timber framed and boarded.

The principal facades of the building are divided into bays by flat vertical moulded fins which extend beyond the parapet line, terminating with leaf shaped silhouettes. These fins define the bays of the building and separate banks of windows surrounded by decorative moulding and moulded panels. A vertical fin moulded panel forms a base to the building and surmounting this are sills for the ground floor window openings. The windows throughout the building are timber framed vertical sashes. Between the windows of the ground floor and the first floor are vertical fin moulded panels with central disc and diamond shaped ornaments which also act as ventilators, alternating on each of the panels. Above the first floor windows openings is a strip moulding with chevron and diamond pattern. The parapet is lined on its upper edge with a strip moulding with a vertical lined pattern which creates a miniature crenellated silhouette between the leaf shaped fins. Separating the windows are vertical moulded pilaster-like elements with vertical mouldings. The other faces of the building are of unrendered brickwork.

At the base of the central entrance bay, which projects both forward from the footprint of the building and substantially above the parapet, is a double timber entrance door. Providing access to this is concrete steps, recessed into and flanked by the lawned court. The doors, which have carved timber Art Deco motif, slide into cavities flanking the doorway. Above the door is a signage panel with "PRO BONO PUBLICO", above which is a fanlight with letting "CHAMBERS". Inside the entrance is a small vestibule from which further terrazzo clad stairs provide entrance to a large public space. Access is provided to the various ground floor offices, the stair hall and a c. 1950s public enquiries counter. The timber, three quarter turn stair is at the southern end of the building and fills the recess created with the projecting entrance bay. The stair has a metal balustrades comprising a simple geometric pattern wrought in steel. The stair hall is lined with square ceramic tiles which have been painted.

The upper floor of the former Council Chambers is arranged with a central space from which the offices and former council chamber is accessed. The former council chamber, on the western Davenport Street side of the building features an elaborate moulded plaster ceiling, which is stepped around the edges. The reveals of the steps formed have alternate bands of mouldings featuring strong geometric designs. Surrounding the uppermost step is a flat moulding spreading into the ceiling and incorporating octagonal shaped ventilators with stylised floral designed covers. The cornice also features a stylised floral moulded pattern. Generally the interior has plaster rendered walls and ceiling, with Art Deco inspired mouldings. The terrazzo floors on the ground floor have been uncovered and the timber floors on the first floor have been clad with vinyl floor sheeting and carpet. A strong room survives on the first floor.

To the rear of the 1935 building is a two storeyed reinforced concrete and glass wing, approximately the same size as the early building and linked to it with a recessed two storeyed wing. The recessed link creates a court on the Davenport Street side of the place, between the two main components of the council chambers, visually separating the buildings.

== Heritage listing ==
The former Southport Town Hall was listed on the Queensland Heritage Register on 5 October 1998 having satisfied the following criteria.

The place is important in demonstrating the evolution or pattern of Queensland's history.

The former Southport Town Hall, constructed in 1935 as the second town hall on the site, demonstrates the development of Southport during the 1930s when a developing permanent community and rapidly increasing transient, holiday making population were provided with a large progressively designed Town Hall, reflecting the anticipated prosperity and development of the shire.

The place is important in demonstrating the principal characteristics of a particular class of cultural places.

The former Southport Town Hall is an important example of an Art Deco influenced building, designed by Brisbane architectural partnership, Hall and Phillips.

The building has strong associations with its designers, Hall and Phillips, who designed many fine buildings in south east Queensland influenced by Art Deco.

The place is important because of its aesthetic significance.

The building has aesthetic significance as a well composed public building on a prominent site, clearly designed to illustrate the progressive nature of the Town Council who built it in a popular inter-war architectural style. The ornamentation and decoration on and within the building contributes to its aesthetic value and the survival of internal Art Deco decoration is rare.

The place has a strong or special association with a particular community or cultural group for social, cultural or spiritual reasons.

The building has social significance as a centrally located civic building which has been open for public purposes for over sixty years.
