= Main Beach Pavilion and Southport Surf Lifesaving Club =

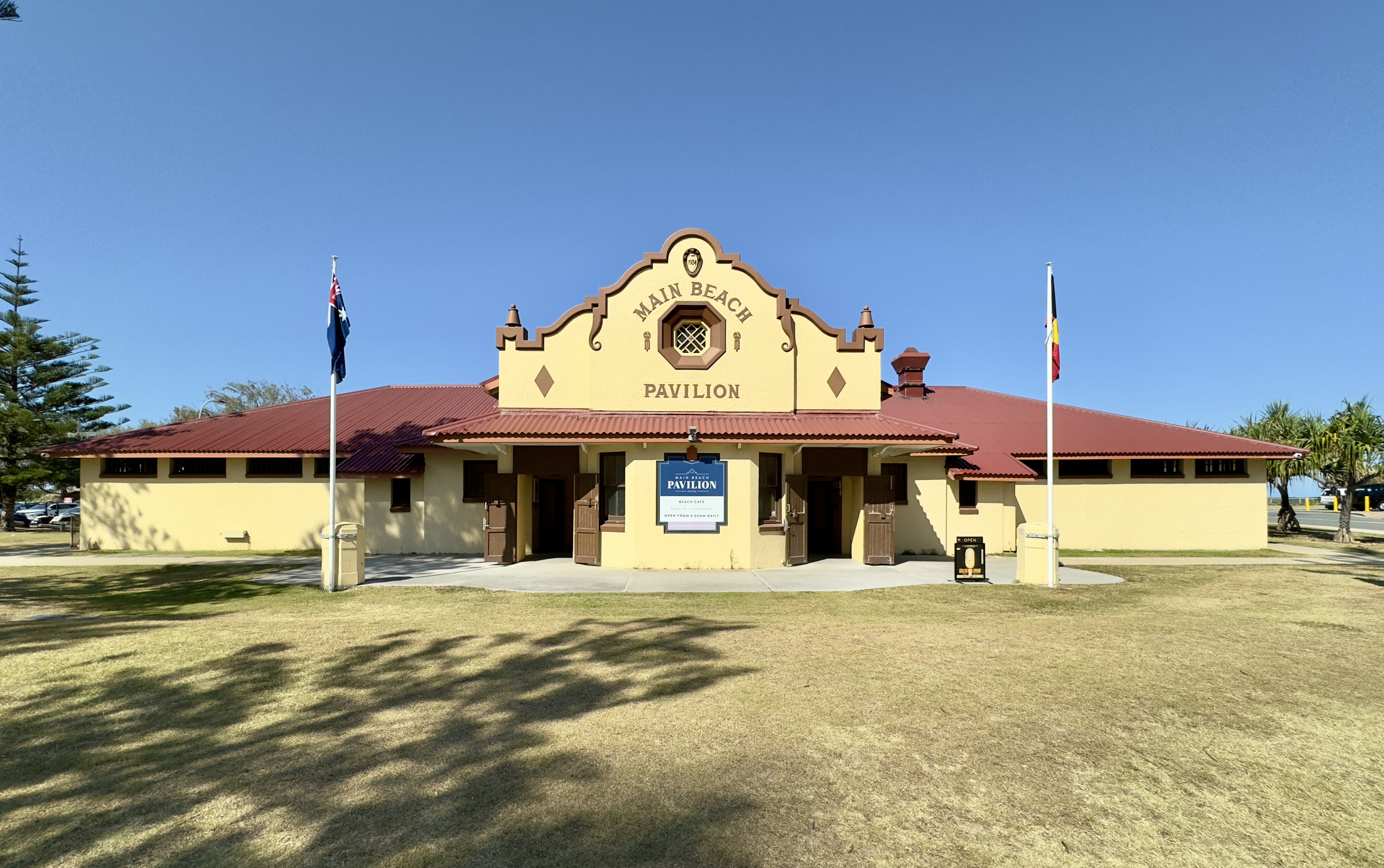
- Main Beach Pavilion, 2023

- Location within Queensland Location within Australia
- 27.9753°S 153.4286°E
- Location: off Macarthur Parade, Main Beach, Queensland, Australia

History
- Design period: 1919–1930s (interwar period)
- Built: 1934, 1936
- Built for: Southport Town Council, Southport Surf Lifesaving Club

Site notes
- Architect: Hall and Phillips

Queensland Heritage Register
- Official name: Main Beach Pavilion and Southport Surf Lifesaving Club
- Type: state heritage (built)
- Designated: 1 March 1995
- Reference no.: 601265
- Significant period: 1934, 1936, 1958, 1978 (fabric); 1934–ongoing (social)
- Significant components: clubroom/s / clubhouse, changing rooms/dressing shed

Main Beach Pavilion and Southport Surf Lifesaving Club are heritage-listed beach buildings off Macarthur Parade, Main Beach, Queensland, Australia. The Main Beach Pavilion was designed by Thomas Ramsay Hall and Lionel Blythewood Phillips of the architectural firm Hall and Phillips and built in 1934 for the Southport Town Council. The Surf Lifesaving Club was also designed by Hall and Phillips and built adjacent in 1936 for the club. They were added to the Queensland Heritage Register on 1 March 1995.

== History ==
The Main Beach Pavilion and Southport Surf Lifesaving Club were constructed on Main Beach at Southport, in the mid 1930s by the Southport Town Council. The Main Beach Pavilion was erected in 1934, and provided public bathing facilities. The Surf Lifesaving Club was built 1936, and provided dormitory space, equipment shelter and club room facilities for the surf lifesavers. Both buildings were designed by Hall and Phillips.

The buildings were erected during an important stage of the development of Southport. There was rapid growth in coastal regions during the 1930s as bathing in sea water became increasingly popular as a recreational pursuit. The majority of the population by the late 1930s benefited from paid holiday leave, increasing leisure time and the opportunities for extended holidays. Councils of various coastal regions were competing for holiday trade by instigating beautification schemes and programmes for the provision of public facilities on the beaches. Many public and commercial buildings were designed during this period in Southport by Hall and Phillips including the Council Chambers (1934), the Pier Theatre (1926), accommodation units (1928), a service station (1929) and various business premises as well as two bathing pavilions and lifesaving clubhouse.

South East Queensland has a long tradition of beach-going, resorts were developed from the 1860s when Sandgate and, to a lesser extent Cleveland, were premier coastal destinations. Southport developed as an alternate resort when Sandgate became more accessible with the introduction of the Sandgate rail line in 1882. Logging in the Southport area commenced in the late 1850s, and by 1875 the first sales of land opened the area for settlement. By the 1880s major Brisbane families favoured Southport as the principal sea-side area. The construction of major schools, banks and hotels stimulated Southport's growth as a fashionable nineteenth century resort as did the presence of the Queensland Governor's residence in the 1890s. The South Coast rail extension from Beenleigh to Southport was opened in 1889 making Southport more accessible from Brisbane.

With increased accessibility and popularity of the beaches during the late nineteenth century and into the twentieth century, the necessity for bathing controls was soon realised. By 1906, Section 109 of the Local Government Act prescribed that individual local councils control swimming and swim-wear, nominating standards for bathing costumes, segregating bathing and defining bathing areas.

=== Main Beach Pavilion ===
In the first decades of the century councils permitted privately owned bathing sheds on the beaches, which provided direct access to the water after changing. In the 1920s custom became more relaxed toward bathing in public. Sea water bathing, formerly encouraged for its curative powers, was gradually becoming a recreational pursuit. South coast councils, realising the possible financial benefits from holiday makers provided firstly public dressing sheds and, later, bathing pavilions.

During the 1930s, various councils of the coastal regions of south east Queensland such as Southport Town Council, Coolangatta Town Council and Nerang Shire Council on the south coast, as well as Redcliffe City Council and the north coast councils, competed for an increase in holiday visitors. Chambers of Commerce and Progress Committees urged councils to develop and beautify foreshore area. The Southport Town Council adopted a beautification plan in the mid-1920s which included the erection of bathing pavilions.

Two bathing pavilions were built, one on Main Beach and the other on the Esplanade close to the Southport railway station. The contractors for the Main Beach Pavilion were Lee & Barnby, who constructed the building at a cost of £4,447, half of which was subsidised by the Queensland Government. The pavilion was built as a single storey brick and concrete structure, with change rooms, showers and lavatories. It contained separate sections for men and women, each with 204 lockers and eight showers with seven lavatories for women and five for the men, an ambulance first aid room and an entertainment hall for dancing.

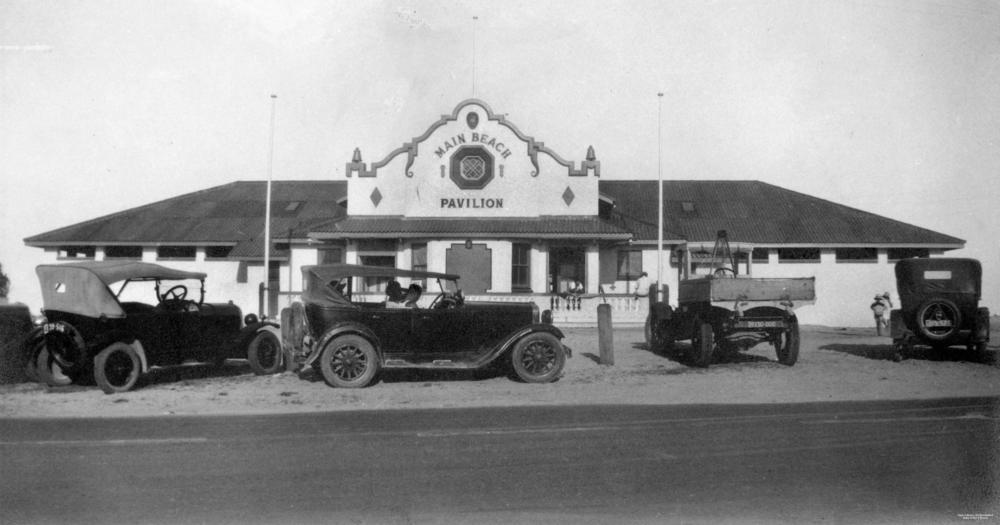
Main Beach Pavilion, 1935

The two bathing pavilions were opened simultaneously on 22 December 1934. The ceremony was held at the Main Beach Pavilion, it being the larger of the two. The buildings were described as of Spanish design, with Hardie's fibro corrugated roofing and copper flashing to prevent corrosion. Upon opening, the pavilion was leased to a married couple, William Thomas and Margaret Elizabeth Vickers, who provided maintenance in return for charging an entrance fee.

Various parties have held leases to sections of the building, from the 1940s the surf lifesavers leased several rooms for storage. From the mid sixties a kiosk was opened at the pavilion when it is thought that an external curved concrete wall was added to the southern end.

Internal concrete block walls were constructed by 1978 diminishing the size of the change rooms, for extended kiosk and storage space.

In 1991–1992 a mural, by artist Derrick Wynness, was commissioned by councillor Dawn Critchlow, for the curved wall on the south of the pavilion. This mural depicts a hot-air balloon journey from Uluru to Main Beach.

=== The Southport Surf Lifesaving Club ===
In the first two decades of the century the increased popularity of bathing led to an increased number of drownings. This publicity surrounding deaths at the Southport beaches concerned the Southport Chamber of Commerce and, in an effort to reduce the number of fatalities beach inspectors were hired. However, because of their inexperience and lack of equipment the inspectors were rarely successful in their attempts at surf lifesaving. The Southport branch of the Surf Lifesaving Club was established in 1912, just six years after the first branch in Australia was formed at Bondi Beach. It was disbanded soon after but reformed in 1919 as the Cable Surf Lifesaving Club, named after the first trans-Pacific cable between Australia and Canada which was located on Main Beach. Again the club disbanded when the cable station closed in 1923, but reformed under its previous and current name soon after. By 1931 there were nine clubs in the South Coast Branch of the Lifesaving Association of Queensland.

The Southport Surf Lifesaving Club built their first permanent home in 1927. This high set building, 9 by 3.6 metres (30 by 12 ft), was clad with timber boards and a corrugated iron hipped roof. The building housed a club room and an ambulance first aid room, and was destroyed in 1936 by cyclonic winds.

By 1934 the Southport Club were canvassing the Southport Town Council and the Queensland Government for subsidies to construct a more appropriate clubhouse. The council intended that the Main Beach Pavilion provide the required lifesaving accommodation. However the club felt that it was inadequate and refused to move to the building preferring to remain in their own shed. They immediately requested a separate clubhouse.

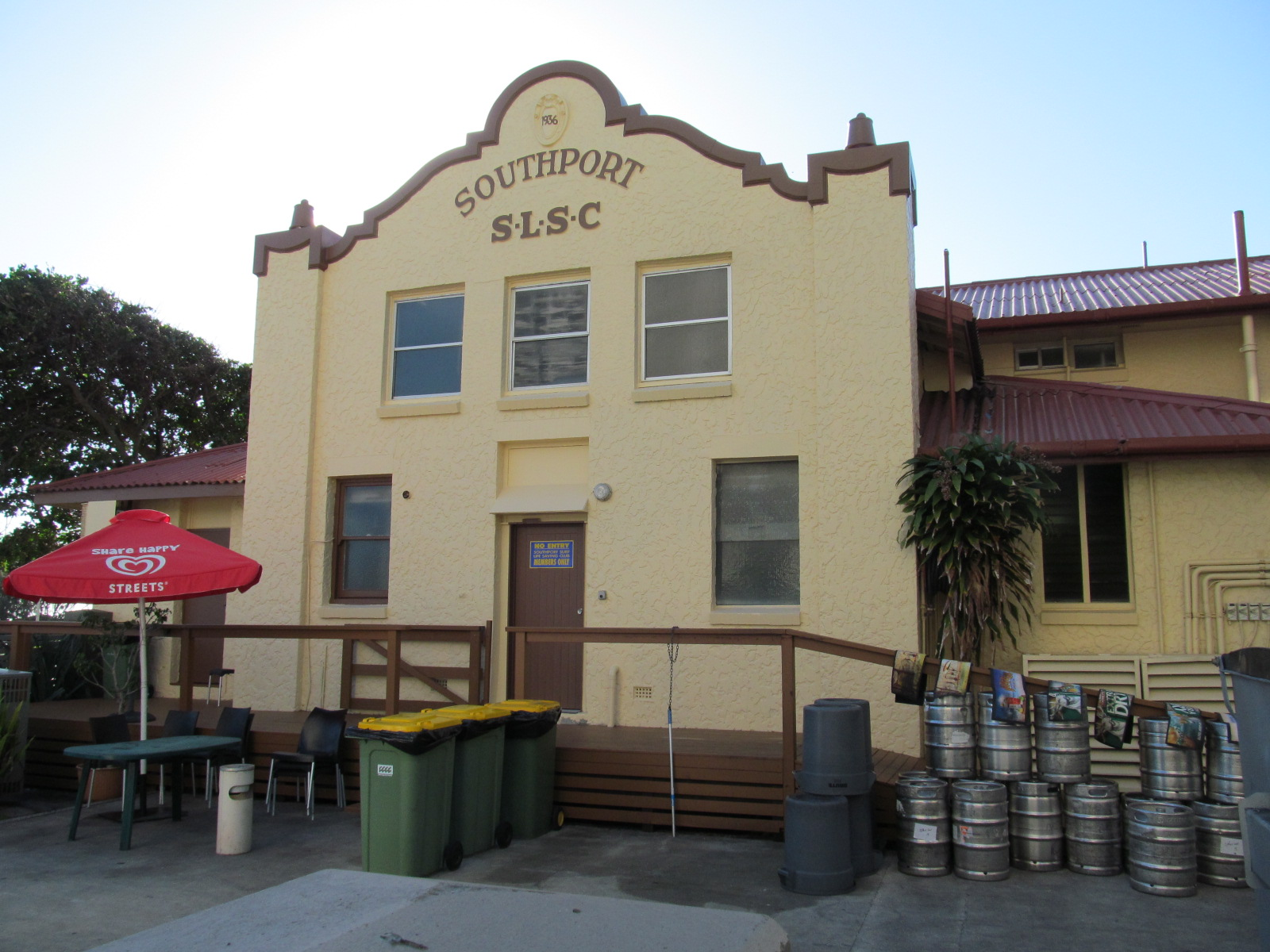
Southport Surf Lifesaving Club, 2013

In 1936, the Queensland Government subsidised a loan to the Southport Town Council for the construction of a surf lifesaving clubhouse for Southport. The building cost "in the vicinity of 1,500 Pounds". It was constructed by the contractor A. Ledbury, who worked on the Southport Bathing Pavilion two years earlier. The site of the previous 1927 club house was too exposed, and thus it was decided to align the new surf club with the Main Beach Pavilion.

The club was a single storey building with a large central room and two smaller side wings. When built the club house was described as "a very fine structure...the interior furnishings of which are up-to-date in every respect". They had ping-pong and billiard tables, showers, boat house, 92 lockers and all other necessary conveniences.

The club has experienced several additions as the lifesaving club grew. New equipment and shortage of accommodation space prompted the first addition to club in 1958, designed by Colin Trapp Architect. This two-storeyed extension included storage areas and dormitories which abutted the south of the building. The roof line of the original club was extended to accommodate the new two storey wing. At this stage a second floor to the original building is thought to have been inserted along with a shelter on the balcony.

The second extension was undertaken in 1978 to incorporate restaurant and bar facilities to increase the revenue of the club. This was designed by John Mobbs and Associates, and consisted of several spaces on the ground floor for storage, living quarters and a gymnasium. The second floor was dedicated to a large function room. A balcony was placed along the eastern facade of the first Trapp addition, linking the original building's balcony with the 1978 work. The top ends of the pilasters and the parapet were partially removed to follow the line of the roof gable. At this time a junior lifesaving club was built at Main Beach north of the bathing pavilion. Minor alterations were prompted by a fire at the Surf Club in 1990.

In 1993 the producers of an Australian television programme, Paradise Beach, chose the Main Beach Pavilion and the Southport Surf Lifesaving Club as outdoor scenes for their serial based on life at the Gold Coast, leading to external sections of both buildings being painted.

== Description ==
The Southport Surf Lifesaving Club and the Main Beach Pavilion are prominently located on Main Beach with vehicular access from Macarthur Street on the west. The listing boundary includes the two buildings with associated plantings and a group of Norfolk Island pines to the south of the Surf Lifesaving Club.

Both buildings illustrate the Spanish Mission style of architecture particularly on the decorative parapeted gables, the heavy pilasters, the external stucco render and the prominent roof sheeted with corrugated fibrous cement, reminiscent of the cordova tile.

=== Main Beach Pavilion ===
The Main Beach Pavilion is a single storeyed building, used as a public toilet, showering and changing facility, with a kiosk and storage rooms for public and lifesaving use. It is of brick and concrete construction, with a fibrous cement roof.

The pavilion is rectangular in plan with central projecting bays on the east and west elevation. Decorative parapeted gables form the facade of the projecting bays. The parapets conceal the gabled roofs which abut them. The north and south wings of the building are hipped roofed.

The symmetrically arranged west elevation facing Macarthur Parade features a decorative gable element. At ground level this steps out to form a protruding bay unit housing a signage area in relief render. The decorative elements of the gable, which occur directly above the bay, include decorative relief patterns, a cartouche inscribed with the date of construction 1934, curved brackets supporting a mid-height awning, a central octagonal multi-paned window opening and lettering "MAIN BEACH PAVILION". The edge of the stylised Baroque parapet has raised edge detailing which culminates in spiralled curved on the face of the parapet.

There are four sets of doors on the western facade, of which only one set is now accessible. The eastern elevation is similar in detail and arrangement. A skillion roofed awning supported by four heavy rendered piers stands in front of the decorative parapet wall. There are five entrances from this facade three of which have overhead window openings. The five openings are fixed with vertical rolling doors. The side wings of the pavilion feature high level windows which are now battened or boarded, with face brick sills.

Internal spaces have been altered with the addition of concrete block walls in many places both in the kiosk and in the change rooms. Timber roof trusses and the underside of the roof sheeting are exposed in most rooms. Sections of timber bench seating and towel peg rails from the 1930s remain in the change rooms. The entrance foyer on the western side of the pavilion has early turnstiles.

=== The Southport Surf Lifesaving Club ===
The Southport Surf Lifesaving Club is a double storey building of brick, concrete and cement block. It is used by the surf lifesaving club and provides dormitory, storage and recreational space, and toilet, showering and restaurant facilities. The building is associated with a large collection of Norfolk Island pines to the south.

The club consists of the original 1934 building, now two storeyed with two major additions on the southern side. The first addition is a continuation of the southern wing of the original section and is similar in style and detailing. The second addition is a large two storeyed, flat roofed structure abutting the southern end of the first addition.

The western elevation of the 1934 section of the building has a central projecting decorative parapeted gable with two heavy pilasters surmounted by urns on either side. The gable has lettering "SOUTHPORT S.L.S.C.", a cartouche with the date of construction, 1936 and parapet edge detailing similar to that of the Main Beach Pavilion. There are three window openings to the upper level, and two to the lower and a doorway accessed by a ramp from the south. The window openings have face brick sills. The roof of the 1934 building is gabled and clad with corrugated fibrous cement sheeting with a skillion roofed section on the northern wing. The upper floor of the 1934 building is supported on steel columns and is accessed by two steel and concrete stairways. Concrete block walls are used extensively throughout the interior of this and the extensions.

== Heritage listing ==
Main Beach Pavilion and Southport Surf Lifesaving Club was listed on the Queensland Heritage Register on 1 March 1995 having satisfied the following criteria.

The place is important in demonstrating the evolution or pattern of Queensland's history.

The area is pivotal in understanding the development of the Gold Coast as a holiday resort and in particular the growth of the Southport area. It demonstrates the evolution of sea bathing from a curative activity to a recreational pursuit.

The place demonstrates rare, uncommon or endangered aspects of Queensland's cultural heritage.

The buildings and associated grounds are now rare examples of the natural and built environment of the 1930s at the south coast.

The place is important in demonstrating the principal characteristics of a particular class of cultural places.

The buildings are examples of the influence of a Spanish Mission style of architecture and of the public work of the prominent architectural firm, Hall and Phillips, at Southport.

The place has a strong or special association with a particular community or cultural group for social, cultural or spiritual reasons.

The area has an association with the Surf Lifesaving Association of Queensland, and in particular with the Southport Branch of the Association.

== See also ==
- Surf lifesaving
- Surf Life Saving Australia
- List of Australian surf lifesaving clubs
