= Drew (name) =

- Pronunciation: /ˈdru/
- Gender: Unisex
- Language: English

Origin
- Languages: French, Norman, Irish, English
- Region of origin: France, Ireland, England

Other names
- Related names: Andrew

Drew (/druː/) is both a surname and a given name. A son of Charlemagne had that name, and it became popular in France as Dreus and Drues. Another source was the county of Dreux, also in France, ruled by the Counts of Dreux from the 12th century onward. The name was introduced to England by the Normans, in 1066 at the time of the Conquest, and is first found there in the Domesday Book. Another derivation is from the Irish Ó Draoi, literally meaning "Descendant of the Druid". As a male given name, it can be a shortened version of Andrew.

== First name ==
=== Male ===
- Drew (artist) (born 1979), American artist of webcomic Toothpaste for Dinner
- Drew Abbott (born 1947), American guitarist; past member of the Silver Bullet Band
- Drew Adamick, Canadian candidate in the Liberal Party of Canada candidates in the 2008 Canadian federal election
- Drew Adams (born 1986), American former PLL player
- Drew Alan Kaplan, American owner of electronics company DAK Industries
- Drew Allar (born 2004), American NFL player
- Drew Allbritten (1947–2026), American former politician and academic administrator
- Drew Allemang, Canadian CFL assistant general manager and director
- Drew Anderson, several people
- Drew Anthony (born 1969), Australian performer, director, choreographer, and producer
- Drew Arellano (born 1980), Filipino actor and host
- Drew Arnott, Scottish-Canadian musician and songwriter
- Drew Avans (born 1996), American minor league baseball player
- Drew Azzopardi (born 2004), American college football player
- Drew B. Tipton (born 1967), American district judge
- Drew Baglino, American engineer and manufacturing industry executive
- Drew Bagnall (born 1983), Canadian former NHL player
- Drew Baker (born 2002), English professional footballer
- Drew Baldridge (born 1991), American country singer
- Drew Banfield (born 1974), Australian former AFL player
- Drew Bannister (born 1974), Canadian NHL coach and former player
- Drew Barham (born 1989), American professional basketball player
- Drew Barnes (born 1961), Canadian politician
- Drew Barry (born 1973), American retired CBA-, NBL-, and NBA player
- Drew Bartkiewicz, American businessman, executive, author, and serial entrepreneur
- Drew Basil (born 1991), American AFL player
- Drew Basile, American contestant on Survivor (American TV series)
- Drew Baur (1944–2011), American businessman
- Drew Bavaro (born 2000), American AHL player
- Drew Beam (born 2003), American MLB pitcher
- Drew Beattie (born 1952), American painter and sculptor
- Drew Beckie (born 1990), Canadian former professional soccer player and current team manager
- Drew Bennett (born 1978), American former NFL player
- Drew Bernstein (1963–2014), American punk-, goth-, and fetish fashion designer and musician
- Drew Berry (born 1970), American biomedical animator
- Drew Binsky (born 1991), American travel blogger and vlogger
- Drew Bledsoe (born 1972), American former NFL player
- Drew Blickensderfer (born 1976), American NASCAR crew chief
- Drew Bobo (born 2004), American college football player
- Drew Bowers (1886–1985), American politician
- Drew Brads (born 1999), American Rubik's cube speedsolver
- Drew Brand (born 1957), Scottish former professional footballer
- Drew Brees (born 1979), American former NFL player
- Drew Brierley (born 1997), English former cricketer
- Drew Brophy (born 1971), American artist
- Drew Brown, several people
- Drew Buie (born 1947), American former NFL player
- Drew Burress (born 2004), American MLB baseball player
- Drew Busby (1947–2022), Scottish footballer
- Drew Butera (born 1983), American former MLB player and current coach
- Drew Butler (born 1989), American former NFL player
- Drew Caldwell (born 1960), Canadian politician
- Drew Callander (born 1956), Canadian former NHL player
- Drew Cannon (born 1990), American statistician and sports writer
- Drew Carey (born 1958), American actor, comedian, and game show host
- Drew Carlton (born 1995), American MLB pitcher
- Drew Carter, several people
- Drew Casen (born 1950), American professional bridge player
- Drew Casper, American film historian, film theorist, non-fiction writer, and former professor
- Drew Chadwick (born 1992), American musician; member of rap rock band Emblem3; contestant on Season 2 of The X Factor (American TV series)
- Drew Cheshire (born 1991), English professional rugby union player
- Drew Chicone (born 1979), American author, saltwater fly designer, fly fisherman, and fly casting instructor
- Drew Christensen (born 1993), American politician
- Drew Christiansen (1945–2022), American Jesuit priest, author, and professor of ethics and human development
- Drew Christie (born 1984), American animator and filmmaker
- Drew Christopher (born 1984), American professional racing cyclist
- Drew Christopherson, American member of electronic rock band Digitata (band)
- Drew Christy, American traveling sales representative; contestant on Survivor (American TV series)
- Drew Clarke, Australian former senior public servant
- Drew Coble (born 1947), American former MLB umpire
- Drew Coleman (born 1983), American former NFL player
- Drew Commesso (born 2002), American AHL player
- Drew Conner (born 1994), American former MLS player
- Drew Cooper, American college basketball coach
- Drew Correa (born 1984), Brazilian-born American music producer
- Drew Cost (born 1989), American NPSL player
- Drew Courtney (born 1990), American former professional tennis player
- Drew Coverdale (born 1969), English former footballer
- Drew Crawford (born 1990), American professional basketball player
- Drew Crevello, American writer and former film studio executive
- Drew Crompton (born 1968), American judge and lawyer
- Drew Cronic (born 1974), American college football coach
- Drew Curtis (born 1973), American publisher and writer
- Drew D. Perkins (born 1963), American serial entrepreneur
- Drew Dallas (born c. 1986), American college football coach
- Drew Dalman (born 1998), American former NFL player
- Drew Dalton, American philosopher and professor of English
- Drew Danburry, American folk-pop singer-songwriter
- Drew Daniel, several people
- Drew Darby (born 1947), American politician
- Drew Davis (born 1989), American former NFL player
- Drew Davis, American past member of rock, country music group the Drew Davis Band
- Drew Daywalt (born 1970), American author and filmmaker
- Drew Deckman, American chef and restaurateur
- Drew Dedman, Australian past member of nu metal band Superheist
- Drew Deezy, Samoan American rapper
- Drew Denbaum (born 1949), American writer, actor, director, and educator
- Drew Dennert (born 1995), American politician
- Drew Dennis Dix (born 1944), American retired military veteran
- Drew Denson (1965–2014), American MLB player
- Drew Desjarlais (born 1997), Canadian CFL player
- Drew Dileo (born 1992), American college football- and baseball player
- Drew Dilkens (born 1972), Canadian politician and mayor
- Drew Dober (born 1988), American professional mixed martial artist
- Drew Docherty (born 1965), Scottish former boxer
- Drew Dollar (born 2000), American NASCAR driver
- Drew Domkus, American podcaster
- Drew Doughty (born 1989), Canadian NHL- and OHL player
- Drew Drechsel, American contestant on American Ninja Warrior
- Drew Droege, American actor, comedian, writer, and director
- Drew Edmondson (born 1946), American lawyer and politician
- Drew Elliott (born 1981), American fashion businessman
- Drew Ellis (disambiguation), several people
- Drew Emmitt, American mandolinist, guitarist, fiddle player, flutist, and singer; member of jam band Leftover Salmon
- Drew Endy (born 1970), American synthetic biologist and associate professor
- Drew Esocoff (born c. 1957), American television sports director
- Drew Eubanks (born 1997), American NBA player
- Drew Fairweather, American author, artist, and webcomic creator
- Drew Fata (born 1983), Canadian former NHL player
- Drew Feinberg, American contestant on The Amazing Race (American TV series)
- Drew Ferguson, several people
- Drew Ferris (born 1992), American former college football player
- Drew Fickett (born 1979), American mixed martial artist
- Drew Findling (born 1959), American criminal defense lawyer
- Drew Fischer (born 1980), Canadian MLS referee
- Drew Folmar (born c. 1978), American college football coach
- Drew Forbes (born 1997), American NFL player
- Drew Forsyth, American former drummer of heavy metal band Quiet Riot
- Drew Forsythe (born 1949), Australian actor, singer, writer, and comedian
- Drew Fortier (born 1987), American musician, songwriter, guitarist, filmmaker, actor, and author
- Drew Fraser (born 1944), Canadian-born Australian academic, and former associate professor of law
- Drew French (born 1984), American MLB coach
- Drew Friedman, several people
- Drew Fudenberg (born 1957), American professor of economics
- Drew Fulk (born 1987), American producer and songwriter
- Drew Fuller (born 1980), American actor and former model
- Drew G. Montalvo (born 1983), American DJ and music producer
- Drew Gagnon (born 1990), American CPBL pitcher, and former MLB pitcher
- Drew Garcia (born 1986), American former professional baseball player
- Drew Garrett (born 1989), American actor
- Drew Gasparini (born 1986), American singer, songwriter, and musical theatre composer and lyricist
- Drew Gattine (born 1962), American politician
- Drew Gehling (born 1982), American stage- and screen actor
- Drew Gibbs (1962–2021), American high school football coach
- Drew Gilbert (born 2000), American MLB player
- Drew Gill (born 1949), Scottish former international rugby union player
- Drew Ginn (born 1974), Australian champion rower
- Drew Gitlin (born 1958), American former professional tennis player
- Drew Goddard (born 1975), American film- and television screenwriter, director, and producer
- Drew Goldsack (born 1981), Canadian cross-country skier
- Drew Golz (born c. 1989/1990), American former college baseball- and soccer player
- Drew Gooden (born 1981), Finnish-American sports broadcaster and former NBA player
- Drew Gooden (comedian) (born 1993), American comedian and commentary YouTuber
- Drew Goodman (born 1963), American sportscaster
- Drew Gordon (1990–2024), American NBA player
- Drew Graham, American politician
- Drew Green, American country music singer-songwriter
- Drew Z. Greenberg, American television producer and writer
- Drew Gress (born 1959), American jazz double-bassist and composer
- Drew Griffin (1962–2022), American broadcast journalist
- Drew Gulak (born 1987), American professional wrestler
- Drew Haddad (born 1978), American former NFL player
- Drew Halfmann (born 1967), American sociologist
- Drew Hall (born 1963), American former MLB pitcher
- Drew Hansen (born 1972/1973), American lawyer, author, and politician
- Drew Harris (born 1965), Northern Irish police chief officer
- Drew Harvey (born 1955), Scottish footballer
- Drew Harvey (sport shooter) (born 1978), British sport shooter
- Drew Harwell, American reporter
- Drew Hastings (born 1954), American stand-up comedian, author, and former mayor
- Drew Hayden Taylor (born 1962), Indigenous Canadian playwright, author, and journalist
- Drew Hayes (1969–2007), American writer and comic book artist
- Drew Hayes (baseball) (born 1987), American former MLB pitcher
- Drew Hedman (born 1986), American former MLB player and coach
- Drew Heitzler (born 1972), American artist
- Drew Helleson (born 2001), American NHL player
- Drew Helm (born 1984), American former soccer player
- Drew Henderson (born 1971), American-Dutch retired BNXT player and coach, and current university administrator
- Drew Hendry (born 1964), Scottish politician
- Drew Henry (born 1968), Scottish former professional snooker player
- Drew Henson (born 1980), American former MLB player
- Drew Herring (born 1987), American professional stock car racing driver, test driver, and spotter
- Drew Hester (born 1969), American drummer, percussionist, and record producer
- Drew Hickey, Australian former rugby union player
- Drew Hill (1956–2011), American NFL player
- Drew Hodgdon (born 1981), American former NFL player
- Drew Holcomb, American musician; member of Drew Holcomb and the Neighbors
- Drew Holland (born 1995), American water polo player
- Drew Houston (born 1983), American Internet entrepreneur; founder and CEO of Dropbox
- Drew Howells, American politician
- Drew Hunter (born 1997), American middle-distance runner
- Drew Hutchison, several people
- Drew Hutton (born 1947), Australian activist, academic, campaigner, and former political candidate
- Drew Hutton (politician) (1953–2014), Canadian politician
- Drew Hyland (born 1939), American professor of philosophy
- Drew Inzer (born 1979), American former NFL player
- Drew Jacksich (1946–2024), American veteran railroad photographer
- Drew Jackson (born 1993), American former MLB player
- Drew Jarvie (born 1948), Scottish former footballer
- Drew Jarvis, Australian children's television presenter
- Drew Johansen, American diving coach
- Drew John (born 1957), American politician
- Drew Johnson (disambiguation), several people
- Drew Karpyshyn (born 1971), Canadian video game scenario writer, scriptwriter, and novelist
- Drew Kaser (born 1993), American former NFL player
- Drew Kasper, real name of Brutus Creed (born 1996), American professional wrestler
- Drew Kemp (born 2002), German-born British motorcycle speedway rider
- Drew Kendall (born 2001), American football player
- Drew Kerr (born 2004), American soccer player
- Drew Kibler (born 2000), American competition swimmer
- Drew Kirsch, American music video director
- Drew Kittleson (born 1989), American former professional golfer
- Drew Kunin, sound mixer
- Drew Kunz (born 1969), American poet, artist, yoga teacher, and photographer
- Drew Lachey (born 1976), American singer and actor
- Drew Larman (born 1985), American former NHL player
- Drew LeBlanc (born 1989), American DEL player
- Drew Levi/Lexi Thomas, alternate name of Steve Kramer (actor), American actor
- Drew Levin, American businessman, film- and television producer, executive producer, and writer
- Drew Lewis (1931–2016), American businessman and politician
- Drew Lightfoot (born 1978), Canadian director and animator
- Drew Lint (born 1987), Canadian film director and screenwriter
- Drew Linzer, American political scientist
- Drew Litton (born 1958), American cartoonist
- Drew Lock (born 1996), American NFL player
- Drew Locke (born 1986), English rugby union player
- Drew Louis (born 2000), American record producer, singer, and songwriter
- Drew Love, American member of R&B duo They (duo)
- Drew Lynch, American stand-up comedian
- Drew MacEwen (born 1973), American politician
- Drew Macias (born 1983), American former MLB player
- Drew MacIntyre (born 1983), Canadian former NHL- and KHL player, and current NHL coach and scout
- Drew MacNeil (born 1964), Scottish former shinty player and current manager
- Drew Maddox (born c. 1987), American college football coach
- Drew Magary (born 1976), American journalist, humor columnist, podcast host, and novelist
- Drew Maggi (born 1989), American MLB player
- Drew Mahalic (born 1953), American former NFL player
- Drew Maloney (born 1969), American former government official
- Drew Marshall (born 1966), Canadian radio presenter
- Drew Martin (born 1994), American LNB player
- Drew Massey, American producer, writer, voice actor, puppeteer, director, cartoonist, illustrator, and character designer
- Drew Maxwell, Canadian past member of electronic band Moev
- Drew McAdam (born 1955), Scottish mentalist, mindreader, and speaker
- Drew McAlister, Australian country musician
- Drew McAthy (born 1982), American retired PDL- and USL player
- Drew McConnell (born 1978), Irish bass guitarist and singer
- Drew McCreadie (born 1967), Canadian writer and comedian
- Drew McDermott (1949–2022), American professor of computer science
- Drew McDonald (basketball) (born 1996), American former basketball player
- Drew McDonald (wrestler) (1955–2015), Scottish professional wrestler
- Drew McDowall (born 1961), Scottish composer and musician
- Drew McFedries (born 1978), American retired mixed martial artist
- Drew McIntyre (born 1985), Scottish professional wrestler
- Drew McKissick (born 1968), American politician
- Drew McMaster (born 1957), Scottish retired sprinter
- Drew McTaggart, Canadian member of alternative rock band Dear Rouge
- Drew Meekins (born 1985), American retired pairs skater, coach, and choreographer
- Drew Mehringer (born 1987), American football coach and former player
- Drew Mendoza (born 1997), American professional baseball player
- Drew Mestemaker (born 2006), American college football player
- Drew Meyer (born 1981), American former MLB player
- Drew Millas (born 1998), American MLB player
- Drew Miller (disambiguation), several people
- Drew Milne, Scottish contemporary poet and academic
- Drew Mitchell (born 1984), Australian former rugby union professional player
- Drew Moor (born 1984), American former MLS player
- Drew Morey (born 1996), Australian cyclist
- Drew Morgan (born 1994), American former college football player
- Drew Mormino (born 1983), American former NFL player
- Drew Morphett (1948–2017), Australian sports broadcaster
- Drew Moss (born 2003), American football player
- Drew Mulholland, Scottish rock musician
- Drew Naylor (born 1986), Australian former professional baseball pitcher
- Drew Naymick (born 1985), American professional basketball player
- Drew Ne'emia (born 1985), New Zealand television personality- and presenter, director, and singer
- Drew Neilson (born 1974), Canadian snowboarder
- Drew Neitzel (born 1985), American former professional basketball player
- Drew Nelson, several people
- Drew Neumann, American musician and composer of film and television scores
- Drew Nicholas (born 1981), American former professional basketball player
- Drew Nieporent, American restaurateur
- Drew Nixon (born 1959), American former politician
- Drew Nowak (born 1990), American former NFL player
- Drew Nystrom (born 1985), American former college football coach
- Drew O'Connor (born 1998), American NHL player
- Drew O'Keefe (1915–1989), American attorney
- Drew Ogletree (born 1998), American NFL player
- Drew Olson (born 1983), American former NFL player
- Drew Olson (sportswriter) (born 1966), American sportscaster
- Drew Pardoll, American medical professor
- Drew Paris (born 1988), Canadian LNAH player, and former AHL-, SHL-, and EIHL player
- Drew Parker (born 1997), Welsh professional wrestler
- Drew Parker (musician), American country singer-songwriter
- Drew Parks (born 1991), American former rapper, record producer, and songwriter
- Drew Parrish (born 1997), American professional baseball pitcher
- Drew Parsons, several people
- Drew Patterson (born 2001), American UPSL- and USL player
- Drew Pavlou (born 1999), Australian political activist and philosophy student; organizer of pro-democracy demonstrations in support of Hong Kong
- Drew Pearce (born 1975), Scottish screenwriter, director, and producer
- Drew Pearson, several people
- Drew Pember (born 2000), American professional basketball player
- Drew Perkins (born 1956), American politician
- Drew Peters, American record producer and songwriter
- Drew Peterson (born 1954), American convicted murderer and former police officer
- Drew Peterson (basketball) (born 1999), American NBA player
- Drew Peterson (South Dakota politician), American politician
- Drew Petkoff (born 1985), Canadian NLL- and MSL player
- Drew Petrie (born 1982), Australian former AFL- and WAFL player
- Drew Petzing (born 1987), American NFL coach
- Drew Phillips, American Internet personality and YouTuber
- Drew Pinsky (born 1958), American media personality, internist, and addiction medicine specialist
- Drew Plitt (born 1998), American UFL player
- Drew Pomeranz (born 1988), American MLB pitcher
- Drew Porter (born 1985), Western Australian former cricketer
- Drew Powell, several people
- Drew Pritchard, British salvage dealer
- Drew Pyne (born 2000), American college football player
- Drew R. McCoy, American historian
- Drew Rader (1901–1975), American MLB pitcher
- Drew Radovich (born 1985), American former NFL player
- Drew Ramos (born 1997), American past member of boy band In Real Life (band)
- Drew Ramsey, American record producer and songwriter
- Drew Rasmussen (born 1995), American MLB pitcher
- Drew Ray Tanner (born 1992), Canadian actor
- Drew Remenda (born 1962), Canadian former hockey coach, radio broadcaster, and television hockey analyst
- Drew Riker, American contestant on The Amazing Race (American TV series)
- Drew Robertson, Canadian retired military officer
- Drew Robinson (born 1992), American former MLB player
- Drew Rokos, Australian comedian
- Drew Rom (born 1999), American MLB pitcher
- Drew Romig (born 1998), American professional soccer player
- Drew Romo (born 2001), American MLB player
- Drew Rosas, American independent filmmaker
- Drew Rosenhaus (born 1966), American sports agent
- Drew Roulette, American member of rock band Dredg
- Drew Roy (born 1986), American actor
- Drew Rucinski (born 1988), American MLB pitcher
- Drew Ruggles (born 1992), American MASL- and UPSL player
- Drew Russell (born 1988), Australian racing driver
- Drew Rutherford (1953–2005), Scottish professional footballer
- Drew Ryan Scott (born 1983), American songwriter and producer; past member of boy band Varsity Fanclub
- Drew S. Days III (1941–2020), American legal scholar
- Drew Sample (born 1996), American NFL player
- Drew Sanders (born 2000), American NFL player
- Drew Sarich (born 1975), American stage actor and singer songwriter
- Drew Saunders, several people
- Drew Scanlon, American video producer
- Drew Schiestel (born 1989), Canadian ACH player
- Drew Scott (born 1978), Canadian reality television personality
- Drew Seeley (born 1982), Canadian-American actor, singer, and dancer
- Drew Shafer (1936–1989), American gay rights activist
- Drew Shalka (born 1995), Canadian singer, multi-instrumentalist, and songwriter
- Drew Shelton (born 2003), American college football player
- Drew Sheneman (born c. 1975), American editorial cartoonist
- Drew Shepherd (born 1994), American USL- and MLS player
- Drew Sherman (born 1987), Welsh professional football manager
- Drew Shindell, American physicist, climate specialist, and professor
- Drew Shoals, American past member of pop rock band Train (band)
- Drew Shore (born 1991), American former NHL- and KHL player
- Drew Skundrich (born 1995), American USLC player
- Drew Smith (disambiguation), several people
- Drew Smyly (born 1989), American MLB pitcher
- Drew Snyder (born 1946), American film- and television actor
- Drew Speaker, American personal-injury lawyer who started the 2007 tuberculosis scare
- Drew Springer (born 1966), American businessman and politician
- Drew Stafford (born 1985), American former NHL player
- Drew Stanton (born 1984), American former NFL player
- Drew Starkey (born 1993), American actor
- Drew Steckenrider (born 1991), American MLB pitcher
- Drew Steen (born 1986), American professional drummer
- Drew Stevens (born 2003), American football player
- Drew Stokesbary (born 1985), American lawyer and politician
- Drew Stone, American film director, producer, film editor, author, and musician
- Drew Storen (born 1987), American former MLB pitcher
- Drew Strojny (born 1981), American former professional football player
- Drew Strotman (born 1996), American MLB pitcher
- Drew Struzan (born 1947), American artist, illustrator, and cover designer
- Drew Stubbs (born 1984), American former MLB player
- Drew Sullivan (born 1980), English retired BBL- and SLB player
- Drew Sutton (born 1983), American former MLB player
- Drew Svoboda, American football coach
- Drew Taggart (born 1989), American member of electronic DJ and production duo The Chainsmokers
- Drew Tal (born 1957), Israeli-born American artist and photographer
- Drew Talbot (born 1986), English former professional footballer
- Drew Tarver (born 1986), American actor and comedian
- Drew Tate (born 1984), American CFL coach and former player
- Drew Terrell (born 1991), American NFL coach
- Drew Thomas (born 1971/1972), Jamaican-born American comedian
- Drew Thorpe (born 2000), American MLB pitcher
- Drew Timme (born 2000), American professional basketball player
- Drew Turnbull (c. 1930–2012), Scottish rugby union and professional rugby league footballer
- Drew Tyler Bell (born 1986), American actor
- Drew Uyi (born 1976), British football agent, brand strategist, and entrepreneur
- Drew Valentine (born 1991), American college basketball coach
- Drew Van Acker (born 1986), American actor, model, and producer
- Drew Van Horn (born 1960), American college president and administrator
- Drew Vaupen, American television writer and producer
- Drew VerHagen (born 1990), American NPB- and MLB pitcher
- Drew Von Bergen (1940–2017), American journalist and press secretary
- Drew Wahlroos (1980–2017), American NFL player
- Drew Waters (born 1998), American MLB player
- Drew Weatherford (born 1985), American former NFL-, UFL-, and AFL player
- Drew Weaver (born 1987), American professional golfer
- Drew Weing, American comic artist
- Drew Weissman (born 1959), American physician and immunologist
- Drew Westen, American professor of psychology and psychiatry
- Drew Westervelt (born 1985), American former NLL- and MLL player
- Drew White (lawyer), Canadian international lawyer
- Drew Williams (born 1994), American former football player
- Drew Willy (born 1986), American former CFL player
- Drew Wilson (born 1967), Scottish former cyclist
- Drew Windle (born 1992), American middle-distance runner
- Drew Wolitarsky (born 1995), Canadian CFL player
- Drew Womack, American past member of country music band Sons of the Desert (band)
- Drew Worsham, American past member of alternative rock band Dreams So Real
- Drew Wright (born 1979), Canadian singer and musician
- Drew Wrigley (born 1965), American attorney, lawyer, and politician
- Drew Wylie, Irish Gaelic footballer
- Drew Yates (born 1988), American soccer player
- Drew Zingg (1957–2025), American rock-, blues-, soul-, and jazz guitarist
- John Drew-Bear (born 1955), Venezuelan Olympic Star class sailor
- Justin Drew Bieber (born 1994), Canadian singer-songwriter
- F. Drew Gaffney (born 1946), American doctor and former astronaut
- J. Drew Lanham, American author, poet, and wildlife biologist
- Noble Drew Ali, (1886–1929), American founder of the Moorish Science Temple of America
- Tyger Drew-Honey (born 1996), English actor and television presenter

=== Female ===
- Drew Afualo (born 1995), American influencer, podcaster, and author
- Drew Barrymore (born 1975), American actress, producer, talk show host, author, and businesswoman
- Drew Citron, American member of pop rock band Beverly (band)
- Drew Garrett, American former pop singer, Internet celebrity, and YouTuber
- Drew Gilpin Faust (born 1947), American historian and 28th President of Harvard University
- Drew Harvell, American marine ecologist
- Drew Jacoby (born 1984), American contemporary ballet dancer
- Drew Mechielsen (born 1997), Canadian BMX cyclist
- Drew Shiflett (born 1951), American visual artist
- Drew Sidora (born 1985), American singer and actress
- Drew Spence (born 1992), Jamaican WSL player
- Drew Sycamore (born 1990), Danish singer and songwriter

== Surname ==
=== Male ===
- Alvin Drew (born 1962), American astronaut
- Arthur Drew (1912–1993), English civil servant
- Ben Drew (disambiguation), several people
- Bernie Drew (1927–2010), Australian rugby league footballer
- Bill Drew (1890–1955), Australian VFL player
- Bryce Drew (born 1974), American college basketball coach and former player; son of Homer Drew and brother of Scott Drew
- Cameron Drew (born 1964), American former MLB player
- Charles Drew, several people
- Christopher Drew, several people
- Daniel Drew (disambiguation), several people
- David Drew (politician) (born 1952), British politician
- Dennis Drew (born 1957), American musician
- Doug Drew (1920–2005), American CFL player
- Eric Drew, American crime victim
- Frank Drew (1930–2021), American brigadier general
- Frank Drew (lighthouse keeper) (1864–1931), American lighthouse keeper
- George Drew, several people
- Gerald A. Drew (1903–1970), American Foreign Service Officer
- Harold Drew (1894–1979), American college football coach
- Harry Drew (1902–1972), Australian accountant, politician, and company director
- Homer Drew (born 1944), American college basketball coach; father of Bryce and Scott Drew
- Howard Drew (1890–1957), American track and field athlete, original "World's Fastest Human", first black judge of Connecticut
- Ira W. Drew (1878–1972), American politician
- Irving W. Drew (1845–1922), American politician
- Captain J. Drew (Kent cricketer), 18th-century English amateur cricketer
- J. D. Drew (born 1975), American former MLB player
- James Drew, several people
- Jeff Van Drew (born 1953), American politician
- John Drew, several people
- Jordan Drew (born 1995), Australian international rugby league footballer
- Joseph Drew (1814–1883), English newspaper editor, steamboat proprietor, art collector, writer, and lecturer
- Kenny Drew (1928–1993), American-Danish jazz pianist
- Kenny Drew Jr. (1958–2014), American jazz pianist
- Kevin Drew (born 1976), Canadian musician and songwriter
- Larry Drew (born 1958), American NBA coach and former player
- Larry Drew II (born 1990), American former NBA player
- Martin Drew (1944–2010), English jazz drummer
- Matt Drew, American politician
- Maurice Jones-Drew (born 1985), American former NFL player
- Michael Drew, English professor emeritus of chemistry
- Norman Drew (1932–2023), Northern Irish professional golfer
- Peter Drew, Australian artist
- Patrick Drew (1832–1903), Irish American immigrant, construction contractor, and politician
- R. Harmon Drew Sr. (1917–1995), American judge and politician
- Richard Drew, several people
- Robert Drew (disambiguation), several people
- Ronnie Drew (1934–2008), Irish folk singer, musician, and actor
- Ronnie Le Drew (born 1947), Canadian-born British puppeteer
- Samuel Drew (disambiguation), several people
- Scott Drew (born 1970), American college basketball coach; brother of Bryce Drew and son of Homer Drew
- Stephen Drew (born 1983), American former MLB player
- Thomas Stevenson Drew (1802–1879), American politician
- Willie Drew (born 2000), American football player

=== Female ===
- Doris Drew (born 1927), American singer
- Elizabeth Drew (born 1935), American political journalist and author
- Ellen Drew (1915–2003), American actress
- Fanny Drew, Canadian film producer
- Georgiana Drew (1856–1893), American stage actress
- Jane Drew (1911–1996), English architect and town planner
- Kara Drew (born 1975), American wrestler best known under the ring name Cherry
- Lauren Drew (born 1993), Welsh actress and singer
- Linzi Drew (born 1958), English former glamour model, producer, adult model, and pornographic actress
- Lori Drew, American defendant in United States v. Lori Drew
- Louisa Lane Drew (1820–1897), English-American actress and theatre owner
- Malaya Drew (born 1978), American stage-, film-, and television actress
- Pamela Drew (1910–1989), British artist
- Patti Drew (1944–2025), American pop singer
- Paula Drew (1926–2019), American former actress, singer, and commercial spokesperson
- Sarah Drew (born 1980), American actress and director
- Wendy Drew (born 1929), American former actress

== Fictional characters ==
- Drew, in the US teen sitcom Drake & Josh, played by James Immekus
- Drew Baird, in the US satirical sitcom TV series 30 Rock, played by Jon Hamm
- Drew Baker, in the US action drama TV series Scorpion, played by Brendan Hines
- Drew Ballinger, in the 1972 US thriller film Deliverance, played by Ronny Cox
- Drew Boyd, in the US drama TV series Queer as Folk, played by Matt Battaglia
- Drew Buchanan, in the US soap opera One Life to Live, played by Keith Bogart, Victor Browne, and Sam Ball
- Drew Buchanan II, in the US soap opera One Life to Live, played by Mia-Bella Knight, Elijah Ford, and Isaiah Ford
- Drew Curtis, in the Australian TV soap opera Home and Away, played by Bobby Morley
- Drew Donovan, in the US TV soap opera Days of Our Lives, played by Charles Shaughnessy
- Dr. Drakken (real name Drew Lipsky), in the US animated action comedy TV series Kim Possible, voiced by John DiMaggio; played by Todd Stashwick and Maxwell Simkins (young)
- Drew Grover, in the Australian TV soap opera Neighbours, played by Christopher Kirby
- Drew Kirk, in the Australian TV soap opera Neighbours, played by Dan Paris
- Drew McCaskill, in the New Zealand prime-time soap opera Shortland Street, played by Ben Barrington
- Drew Pickles, in the US animated TV series Rugrats, voiced by Michael Bell and Timothy Simons
- Drew (Pokémon), in the Pokémon anime series, voiced by Mitsuki Saiga (Japanese), Oliver Wyman (4Kids), and Bill Rogers (TPCi) (English)
- Drew Robinson, in the US TV sitcom The Wannabes, played by Drew Reinartz
- Drew Rock, in the US semi-autobiographical sitcom Everybody Hates Chris, played by Tequan Richmond
- Drew Saturday, in the US animated TV series The Secret Saturdays, voiced by Nicole Sullivan
- Drew Sharp, in the US neo-Western crime media franchise Breaking Bad, played by Samuel Webb
- Drew Suffin, in the US medical sitcom Scrubs, played by Michael Mosley
- Drew Torres, in the Canadian teen drama TV series Degrassi: The Next Generation, played by Luke Bilyk
- Drew Vincent, in the US children's TV series Tattooed Teenage Alien Fighters from Beverly Hills, played by Jill Urbach (credited as K. Jill Sorgen)
- Drew Webster, in the New Zealand prime-time soap opera Shortland Street, played by Joel Herbert
- Alexander Drew, in the US fantasy horror drama TV series True Blood, played by Jacob Hopkins
- Nancy Drew, teen sleuth
- Spider-Woman (Jessica Drew), in the US Marvel Comics Universe
- Joey Drew, from the video game Bendy and the Ink Machine, voiced by Dave Rivas
- Sydney Drew, in the Power Rangers S.P.D. TV series, played by Alycia Purrott

== See also ==
- Drewe, a surname
- Drews, a surname
- Dru (disambiguation), includes a list of people with given name and surname Dru
- Drue, a given name and surname
- Alexander Drew (company), taken over by Coloroll
- Carsten de Dreu (born 1966), Dutch psychologist
- Jrue Holiday (born 1990), American basketball player
