= Drewes =

Drewes is a German surname. Notable people with the surname include:

- Asbjørn Drewes, clinical professor at Aalborg University
- Heinz Drewes (1903–1980), German conductor
- Mariëtte Drewes (born 1967), Dutch chess master
- Martin Drewes (1918–2013), German World War II Luftwaffe fighter ace
- Patrick Drewes (born 1993), German footballer
- Paul Drewes (born 1982), Dutch rower
- Werner Drewes (1899–1985), German-American printmaker and painter
- Wilhelm Drewes (1907–1982), German Wehrmacht general

== See also ==
- Ted Drewes, restaurant in St Louis, Missouri
- Drews (disambiguation)
