= Total Recall 2070 =

1999 science fiction television series

- Total Recall 2070 title card
- Genre: Science fiction
- Created by: Art Monterastelli
- Starring: Michael Easton; Karl Pruner; Cynthia Preston; Michael Rawlins; Judith Krant; Matthew Bennett
- Composers: Jack Lenz; Zoran Borisavljevic
- Countries of origin: Canada; Germany
- No. of episodes: 22

Production
- Executive producers: Art Monterastelli; Drew S. Levin
- Producer: Jeff King
- Running time: 60 minutes (pilot); 44 minutes (series)
- Production companies: Alliance Atlantis Productions; PolyGram Television; ProSieben; Screenventures XXXVI Productions; Team Entertainment; WIC Entertainment; Showtime Networks

Original release
- Network: OnTV (Canada); Showtime (United States)
- Release: January 5 – June 8, 1999

Total Recall 2070 is a science fiction television series influenced by the work of Philip K. Dick. It was first broadcast in 1999 on the Canadian television channel CHCH-TV and later the same year on the American Showtime channel. It was later syndicated in the United States with some editing to remove scenes of nudity, violence and (in most cases) strong language.

The series was filmed in Toronto, Ontario. It was a Canadian/German co-production. A single season consisting of 22 episodes was produced.

== Story ==
Total Recall 2070 takes place in a dark, crowded, industrial and cosmopolitan setting, with a noir sci-fi aesthetic. The government bureaucracy is heavily influenced by a small number of extremely powerful companies called "the Consortium" (including computer memory and virtual-reality vacation provider Rekall and android manufacturer Uber Braun).

David Hume is a senior detective for the Citizens Protection Bureau (CPB), a police agency focused on general public safety. After his partner is killed by self-aware androids, he is partnered against his wishes with Ian Farve, a naive officer new to the department, who is himself secretly an "Alpha Class" android—a model with a more complex psychological nature. Hume and the CPB often have conflicts with the Assessor's Office (the investigative agency that has sole jurisdiction over crimes related to the Consortium) and with the private security forces of Consortium companies.

The main story arcs of the series concern the agendas of the Consortium, the mystery of Farve's origins, Hume's wife Olivia, whose memories have been tampered with, and the mysterious manufacturer of Alpha Class androids. Significant plot elements remain unresolved by the end of the series run, due to cancellation; a crucial story arc from the series was the suggestion that the memory expansion used on self-aware androids was part non-human DNA and that a material found by a remote base on Mars could create a hybrid of human and android DNA.

=== Main characters ===
- Michael Easton as David Hume: A CPB Detective whose original partner was killed by rogue androids. His initial highly antagonistic attitude towards androids changes once he gets to know his new partner.
- Karl Pruner as Ian Farve: Hume's android partner. Farve is an Alpha-class prototype android, an advanced model based on synthetic cloning technology. Farve is polite and very formal.
- Cynthia Preston as Olivia Hume: Hume's wife. In the episode "Paranoid", she discovers that false memories were implanted on her before she met her husband, which leads to their separation.
- Michael Anthony Rawlins as Martin Ehrenthal: Hume's superior at the CPB.
- Judith Krant as Olan Chang: CPB forensic pathologist and computer specialist.
- Matthew Bennett as James Calley: A representative for the Assessors Office (a more invasive future version of Internal Affairs), who often butts heads with Hume and Farve.

=== The Consortium ===
Company Logos for Minacon and Uber Braun

By the year 2070, Earth and Mars (as well as space stations) are ruled by a unified government known as the Interplanetary Council (IPC). However, much of the real power is held by the Consortium, composed of at least six multi-global companies that financed the colonization of Mars.

The known six companies are:

- Rekall, the information technology powerhouse of the 21st century. Rekall also provides the Operating Systems for the Androids manufactured by Uber Braun.
- Minacon, the energy supply company, provides both the oil on Earth and the deuterium on Mars.
- Tashimo-Pacific, the transport company, created "Johnny Cab."
- Uber Braun, the rocket and robotics corporation, builds service androids.
- Variable Dynamics, the medical and bio-tech company, is interested in creating synthetic humans.
- Tillman Heath advertising boards are around the city in the series. Tillman Heath is the agriculture and chemicals giant but its real purpose was not unveiled in the 1st series. Its slogan is "Bringing the world's food supply to you."

== Production ==
Total Recall 2070 was created by Art Monterastelli. The series is named after the 1990 film Total Recall, loosely based on Philip K. Dick's short story "We Can Remember It for You Wholesale", but it has been noted as sharing no major plot points or characters with it, other than the Rekall company and the concept of virtual vacations. Instead, a much larger influence in its plot elements and especially visual style has been recognized to be the 1982 film Blade Runner, itself a loose adaptation of Dick's novel Do Androids Dream of Electric Sheep?. Series creator Art Monterastelli has admitted the stronger influence of Blade Runner over Total Recall, and explained, he thought doing a paranoid psychological thriller with a strong visual background reminiscent of Blade Runner, would be a better use of their limited budget, provide more creative opportunities to the writers, and even be more in line with the spirit of Dick's antihero storylines as found in his body of work, compared to the Total Recall action film. Despite the influence of his works to the series production, Dick is not credited on the series main or end titles.

Most of this series was filmed at the Downsview Park studio, at the location of a former Canadian Forces Base in north Toronto. The series futuristic cityscape was created by John Gajdecki and his company Gajdecki Visual Effects, blending computer-generated images with a live-action soundstage set. Two or three levels of entire futuristic environment were constructed for the production and later mixed with the CGI.

== Episode list ==
No.	Title	Directed by	Written by	Original release date	Prod. code
1	"Machine Dreams (part 1)"	Mario Azzopardi	Art Monterastelli	January 5, 1999	TBA
David Hume and his new partner Ian Farve must track down a gang of androids.
2	"Machine Dreams (part 2)"	Mario Azzopardi	Art Monterastelli	January 12, 1999	TBA
The detectives' hunt for the androids takes them to Mars.
3	"Nothing Like the Real Thing"	Terry Ingram	Elliot Stern	January 19, 1999	TBA
A motiveless murder leads Hume to investigate black-market memory implants.
4	"Self-Inflicted"	Jorge Montesi	Ted Mann	February 2, 1999	TBA
When a Doctor returns from offworld and her husband dies a few hours later of a pulminary infection, CPB investigates a potential biohazard situation. Meanwhile, Olivia visits Recall with some old family videos.
5	"Allure"	Fred Gerber	Jeff F. King	February 9, 1999	TBA
Farve and Hume witness an attractive young woman's suicide, but soon discover there is more to the story. The case puts Olivia and Hume's personal relationship under stress.
6	"Infiltration"	Mario Azzopardi	Art Monterastelli, W.K. Scott Meyer	February 16, 1999	TBA
Hume and Farve investigate the murder of an Uber-Braun employee.
7	"Rough Whimper of Insanity"	Ken Girotti	Ted Mann	February 23, 1999	TBA
Farve starts behaving erratically.
8	"First Wave"	Jorge Montesi	Elliot Stern	March 2, 1999	TBA
The CPB computer network goes haywire.
9	"Baby Lottery"	David Warry-Smith	Michael Thoma	March 9, 1999	TBA
A baby is taken from his parents because of a genetic disposition towards crime.
10	"Brain Fever"	George Mendeluk	Elliot Stern	March 16, 1999	TBA
The head of the Mars Miners Union is shot by a member who then attempts to kill himself.
11	"Begotten Not Made"	David Warry-Smith	W.K. Scott Meyer	March 23, 1999	TBA
Dr. Latham is starting to cooperate, when a lawyer from Rekall shows up demands his release.
12	"Brightness Falls"	Rod Pridy	Kristy Dobkin, Art Monterastelli	March 30, 1999	TBA
Farve and Moralez investigate the death of a cult leader.
13	"Burning Desire"	Mario Azzopardi	Jeff King	April 6, 1999	TBA
CPB investigates the death of a man who was fried in his sublimator.
14	"Astral Projections"	David Warry-Smith	Michael Thoma	April 13, 1999	TBA
Hume and Farve investigate a cargo transport that went down in the freezing "New Territories".
15	"Paranoid"	Rod Pridy	Michael Thoma	April 20, 1999	TBA
Farve and Hume investigate the murder of the head of the Nexus dating service.
16	"Restitution"	Jorge Montesi	Art Monterastelli, Elliot Stern	April 27, 1999	TBA
Brant is kidnapped on his way to a Mars safe house.
17	"Bones Beneath My Skin"	Mark Sobel	Ted Mann	May 4, 1999	TBA
Farve and Hume investigate the destruction of an android at a chemical company.
18	"Assessment"	Terry Ingram	Jeff King	May 11, 1999	TBA
Farve and Hume are ambushed and captured by a rogue section of the assessor's office.
19	"Eye Witness"	Jorge Montesi	Art Monterastelli, Elliot Stern	May 18, 1999	TBA
Olivia finds a friend's rich husband standing over a bloody corpse.
20	"Personal Effects"	Jorge Montesi	Kristy Dobkin	May 25, 1999	TBA
Olan decides to keep a vial found on a corpse in a crashed shuttle out of her report.
21	"Virtual Justice"	Mark Sobel	Jeff King	June 1, 1999	TBA
After witnessing a fellow cop kill a cornered prison escapee, Hume looks into the dead man's case.
22	"Meet My Maker"	Mario Azzopardi	Art Monterastelli, Ted Mann	June 8, 1999	TBA
Farve takes Hume to meet the alpha-android's creator.

== Distribution ==
=== DVD releases ===
In 1999, the complete series was released on DVD in Japan (in English and dubbed in Japanese). The 2-hour series pilot ("Machine Dreams") has been available on region 1 DVD and VHS (Canada and the United States) since 2000. The series was broadcasting in Italy as of 2010 on Fantasy channel (Sky pay-TV), dubbed in Italian language.

On February 22, 2011, Alliance Home Entertainment released the complete series for the first time on DVD (uncut) in Canada only.

=== Online ===
Since September 2009, the entire 22-episode series (in the censored US versions, and with advertising) has been available in low-resolution Flash Video format via Comcast's official Hulu-based "FanCast" streaming video online service. The whole series was also formerly available online through the beta version of the Joost online TV content distribution system.
