= Cressener =

Cressener is an English surname. Notable people with the surname include:

- Drue Cressener (c. 1642–1718), English clergyman and theological writer
- Elizabeth Cressener (c. 1457–1536 or 1537), English prioress of the Dominican Dartford Priory in Kent
