= Ancient Philosophy (journal) =

- Discipline: Philosophy
- Language: English
- Edited by: Ron Polansky

Publication details
- History: 1980–present
- Publisher: Philosophy Documentation Center (United States)
- Frequency: Biannual

Standard abbreviations
- ISO 4: Anc. Philos.

Indexing
- ISSN: 0740-2007 (print); 2154-4689 (web)
- LCCN: 95-642779
- OCLC no.: 7531090

Links
- Journal homepage; Tables of content, 1980-present

Ancient Philosophy is a peer-reviewed academic journal devoted to the study of ancient Greek and Roman philosophy and science. Since 1980 it has published over 1,300 articles and reviews in this field. This journal has a Level 2 classification from the Publication Forum of the Federation of Finnish Learned Societies. and a SHERPA/RoMEO "green" self-archiving policy. It is edited by Ron Polansky in the Department of Philosophy at Duquesne University. It is published on behalf of Mathesis Publications by the Philosophy Documentation Center.

== Notable contributors ==
- Seth Benardete
- Richard Bett
- Jaako Hintikka
- Drew Hyland
- Gareth Matthews
- Alasdair MacIntyre
- Roger Scruton
- Gisela Striker
- Gregory Vlastos

== Indexing ==
Ancient Philosophy is abstracted and indexed in Academic OneFile, L'Année philologique, ERIH PLUS, Humanities Index, Index Religiosus, International Bibliography of Book Reviews of Scholarly Literature, International Bibliography of Periodical Literature, International Philosophical Bibliography, Periodicals Index Online, The Philosopher's Index, PhilPapers, Religion and Philosophy Index, and Scopus, and TOC Premier.

== See also ==
- List of philosophy journals
