= General Drew =

General Drew may refer to:

- Frank Drew (1930–2021), U.S. Air brigadier general
- James Syme Drew (1883–1955), British Army major general
- Thomas E. Drew (born 1950), Vermont National Guard major general
