= William Drew =

William Drew may refer to:

- William Leworthy Goode Drew (1826–1898), English-born auditor-general in colonial Queensland
- William Henry Drew (Christian missionary) (fl. 1840), Christian missionary in India, and translator
- William Henry Drew (textile worker) (1854–1933), British textile worker, trade unionist and politician
- Bill Drew (1890–1955), Australian rules footballer
- William Brooks Drew (1908–1997), American botanist and professor
