= Rock Me Baby (TV series) =

American television series

- Genre: Sitcom
- Created by: Tim Kelleher
- Starring: Dan Cortese; Bianca Kajlich; Carl Anthony Payne; Tammy Townsend
- Composer: Matter Music
- Country of origin: United States
- Original language: English
- No. of seasons: 1
- No. of episodes: 22

Production
- Executive producers: Tony Krantz; Bob Myer
- Camera setup: Multi-camera
- Running time: 30 minutes
- Production companies: Flame Television; Warner Bros. Television

Original release
- Network: UPN
- Release: September 16, 2003 – May 25, 2004

Rock Me Baby is an American sitcom that aired on UPN from September 16, 2003, until May 25, 2004. Set in Denver, Colorado, the show stars Dan Cortese as Jimmy Cox, co-host of a popular Denver radio show with his best friend, Carl, played by Carl Anthony Payne II. Bianca Kajlich plays Beth Cox, Jimmy's wife, and the two have a baby named Otis. Tammy Townsend plays Beth's best friend, Pamela, who is obsessed with the glamorous life.

== Plot ==
Rock Me Baby is about a former exotic dancer, Beth, and a radio personality, Jimmy, who produce a child together, with most of the storylines of each episode revolving around the baby, Otis. Throughout the beginning of the series, Carl has a crush on Pamela and is rejected on every attempt to gain closure with her. Jimmy and Beth overcome a series of obstacles about being new parents and the phases of life.

== Cast and characters ==
- Dan Cortese as Jimmy Cox, the co-host of Denver Radio show, Khor and father of Otis Cox
- Bianca Kajlich as Beth Cox, a former exotic dancer, wife of Jimmy Cox and stay at home mother of Otis Cox
- Carl Anthony Payne as Carl, a co-host of the Denver Radio show Khor, and best friend of Jimmy Cox
- Tammy Townsend as Pamela, a friend of Beth Cox and girlfriend of Carl

== Episodes ==
No.	Title	Directed by	Written by	Original release date	Prod. code	Viewers (millions)
1	"Pilot"	Barnet Kellman	Tim Kelleher	September 16, 2003	475368	2.81
2	"Coupling"	Arlene Sanford	Bob Myer	September 23, 2003	177152	2.51
3	"Would I Lie to You?"	Arlene Sanford	Allison M. Gibson	September 30, 2003	177151	3.08
4	"Shift Shaft"	Brian K. Roberts	Steve Leff & Jim Patterson	October 7, 2003	177154	2.17
5	"Ring of Fire"	Arlene Sanford	Tim Kelleher	October 14, 2003	177153	2.06
6	"Pretty in Pink Eye"	John Fortenberry	Yoni Beakovits & Tony Dreannan	October 21, 2003	177155	2.86
7	"A Pain in the Aspen"	John Blanchard	Tim Kelleher	November 4, 2003	177159	3.03
8	"Girl Power"	Lee Shallat Chemel	Steve Leff & Jim Patterson	November 11, 2003	177157	3.09
9	"The Difference Between Men and Women"	Lee Shallat-Chemel	Allison M. Gibson	November 18, 2003	177158	3.80
10	"Prior Engagement"	Leonard R. Garner, Jr.	Story by : Allison M. Gibson; Teleplay by : Steve Leff & Jim Patterson	November 25, 2003	177160	3.02
11	"Trading Spaces"	John Fortenberry	Bill Freiberger	December 9, 2003	177156	2.37
12	"Look Who's Talking"	Lee Shallat-Chemel	Yoni Berkobits & Tony Dreannan	March 30, 2004	177166	2.59
13	"Pretty Baby"	Leonard R. Garner, Jr.	Bob Myer	March 30, 2004	177161	2.33
14	"Not So Grand Parents"	Unknown	Unknown	April 6, 2004	177167	1.68
15	"Ca-Pam!"	Leonard R. Garner, Jr.	Yoni Beakovits & Tony Dreannan	April 13, 2004	177162	2.57
16	"Who's Your Da-Da?"	Arlene Sanford	Jesse Collins	April 20, 2004	177164	1.87
17	"I Love You, You Don't Love Me"	Unknown	Unknown	April 27, 2004	177163	2.09
18	"Love at First Flight"	Arlene Sanford	Drew Levin	May 4, 2004	177165	2.18
19	"Kiss and Don't Tell"	Lee Shellat-Chemel	Tim Kelleher & Bob Myer	May 18, 2004	177169	1.74
20	"Two's Company, Four's a Crowd"	Leonard R. Garner, Jr.	Steve Leff & Jim Patterson	May 18, 2004	177171	1.66
21	"Go Otis! It's Your Birthday!"	Brian K. Roberts	Steve Leff & Jim Patterson	May 25, 2004	177168	1.70
22	"Singing for Your Supper"	Jody Margolin Hahn	Allison M. Gibson	May 25, 2004	177170	1.53

== Production ==
Rock Me Baby was aired by UPN. The series was a production of Warner Bros. Television.

=== Casting ===
The casting was Deedee Bradley, Megan Branman, Reyna Karp and Susan Vash. The primary focus was the baby who would play as "Otis Cox". Scenes with 'Otis' made it challenging for the rest of the cast as opposed to doing them with an older child, teenager or adult. And filming in a scene, many factors occur such as adapting to any possible noises and crying and having added responsibility. Keeping the baby occupied whilst doing the scene to prevent any outbursts is also a primary concern which can be very challenging. Nicole Richie was a guest star.

=== Filming ===
Main scenes are primarily the open-space apartment of Jimmy and Beth Cox's kitchen, dining and living area and the sound room inside the radio station of where Jimmy and Carl host their radio show, Khor. Usually after each show, the ending scene will be in Jimmy and Beth's bedroom while they lay in bed and speak to each other about the day. Other scenes also include restaurants, Pamela's bedroom, Otis' bedroom, a rooftop of a building, a school administration office, a school performance art stage and a live music stage within the radio station building which are all featured in Denver, Colorado, but filmed in Los Angeles, California, USA.

=== Opening theme ===
The opening theme is "Rock Me Baby" by Matter which is an up-beat rock song.

The closing theme is the instrumental version used for the closing theme. Samples of the instrumental song is used to open and close from adverts.

== Broadcast ==
In the USA the pilot episode of Rock Me Baby debuted on the UPN network on Monday September 15, 2003. The second episode 'Coupling' aired on September 23, 2003 and the following episodes followed exactly one week later. The last episode for the first series was 'Singing for your Supper' which aired on May 25, 2004. After the first season, UPN decided to cancel production of Rock Me Baby.

In Australia, Rock Me Baby debuted on Australia's Nine Network in 2006 and aired on Friday mornings at 2:30 AM.

== Reception ==
TV Guide wrote of the series, "Dismal, even by UPN standards".
