= Drue =

Drue is a name. Notable people with this name include:

== Surname ==
- Kerry Drue, American lawyer
- Thomas Drue (1586–1627), English playwright

== Given name ==
- Drue Chrisman (born 1997), American football player
- Drue Cressener Cressener (1642–1718), English clergyman
- Drue Drury (courtier) (1531–1617), English courtier
- Sir Drue Drury, 1st Baronet (1588–1632), English MP
- Drue Hackenberg (born 2002), American baseball player
- Drue Heinz (1915–2018), American actress
- Drue Kataoka, Japanese visual artist
- Drue Le Guier (born 1959), Australian swimmer
- Drue Leyton (1903–1997), American actress and member of the French Resistance
- Drue Pearce (born 1951), American businesswoman and politician
- Drue Smith (died 2001), American journalist
- Drue Tranquill (born 1995), American football player
- Drue Vitter (1942–2004), American politician

== See also ==
- Drew (name)
