= Andrew Nelson =

Andrew or Andy Nelson may refer to:

== Sports ==
- Andy Nelson (American football) (1933–2025), American football player
- Andy Nelson (footballer) (born 1935), English footballer
- Andrew Nelson (footballer) (born 1997), English footballer
- Andrew Nelson (volleyball) (born 1993), Canadian volleyball player
- Andy Nelson (baseball) (1884–?), baseball player

== Other ==
- Andrew Nelson, co-founder of tech company TomorrowNow
- Andrew Nelson, drummer for the band Tiger Saw
- Andy Nelson (sound engineer), sound engineer
- Andrew Nelson (author), writer and professor
- Andrew Nelson (lexicographer) (1893–1975), missionary and lexicographer
- Andrew Nelson, listed as a defender of the Alamo
- Andrew Nelson, Minnesota gubernatorial candidate in 1928

== See also ==
- Drew Nelson (disambiguation)
- Nelson (surname)
