= Andrew Friedman (disambiguation) =

Andrew Friedman may refer to:

- Andrew Friedman, American baseball executive and president/baseball operations of the Los Angeles Dodgers
- Andrew Friedman (actor), actor (It's Always Sunny in Philadelphia)
- Andy Friedman, American football player
- Drew "Dru-Ha" Friedman, Andrew Friedman

== See also ==
- Drew Friedman (disambiguation)
- Andrew Freedman, owner of the New York Giants
- Andrew Freeman (disambiguation)
