= Samuel Drew (disambiguation) =

Samuel Drew (1765–1833) was a British Methodist theologian. Samuel Drew may also refer to:

- Samuel Henry Drew (1844–1901), New Zealand jeweller and amateur naturalist
- Samuel J. Drew (1863–1926), American politician
- Samuel Drew (died 1907), American carpenter and boatbuilder who built the Drew Residence in Brisbane, Queensland
- Samuel John Drew (fl. 1910s–1960s), son of the carpenter who continued construction of the Drew Residence
- Samuel Drewe (1759–1837), Governor of the Bank of England
