= Andrew Parsons =

Andrew Parsons may refer to:

- Andrew Parsons (American politician) (1817–1855), politician from the U.S. state of Michigan
- Andrew Parsons (photographer) (born 1974), British photographer and political advisor
- Andrew Parsons (Canadian politician) (born 1979), Canadian politician and lawyer
- Andrew Parsons (sports administrator) (born 1977), Brazilian sports administrator and journalist
- Andy Parsons (born 1967), English comedian and writer

== See also ==
- Drew Parsons (disambiguation)
