= Ron Polansky =

American philosopher and educator

- Spouse: Susan Polansky

Philosophical work
- Era: 21st century philosophy
- Region: Western Philosophy
- Main interests: Ancient philosophy

Ron Polansky is an American philosopher and educator. He was a professor of philosophy at Duquesne University through 2019. He edits the journal Ancient Philosophy. He also edits Mathesis Publications. Polansky taught ancient philosophy. He is married to Susan Polansky, who taught at Carnegie Mellon University.

== Selected bibliography ==
=== Authored and edited books ===
- (2024) Aristotle's Parva naturalia: Text, Translation, and Commentary, De Gruyter 978-3-11-123574-5
- (2017) Reading Aristotle: Argument and Exposition, co-edited with William Wians, Brill 9789004329584
- (2014) Cambridge Companion to Aristotle's Nicomachean Ethics, edited, Cambridge University Press 978-0-521-12273-3
- (2007) Aristotle's De anima: A Commentary, Cambridge University Press 978-0-521-86274-5
- (2000) Bioethics: Ancient Themes in Contemporary Issues, co-edited with Mark Kuczewski, M.I.T. Press 0-262-61177-5
- (1992) Philosophy and Knowledge: A Commentary on Plato’s Theaetetus, Bucknell University Press 0-8387-5215-2

=== Selected articles ===
- “The Power of Aristotle’s Hylomorphic Approach” co-authored with Kelsey Ward, 2019 in Philosophy of Mind in Antiquity vol. 1. Pp. 141-159. Routledge
- “The Performance of Philosophizing in the Platonic Lovers” co-authored with Emily Katz, September 2018, American Journal of Philology 139: 397-421
- “Aristotle on Accidental Perception” co-authored with John Fritz, August 2018 in Aristotle-Contemporary Perspectives on his Thought--On the 2400th Anniversary of Aristotle’s Birth. Pp. 125-150. De Gruyter
- “The Modern Aristotle: Michael Polanyi’s Search for Truth against Nihilism” co-authored with David Hoinski, in Continental Metaphysics – Ancient and Modern, Edinburgh University Press, March 2017, pp. 180-201.
- “Aristotle’s Nicomachean Ethics Is a Work of Practical Science” in Reading Aristotle: Argument and Exposition, Brill, 2017, pp. 277-314.
- “Aristotle on Beauty in Mathematics” co-authored with David Hoinski, Dia-noesis October 2016, 2: 37-64
- “Plato on Women’s Natural Ability: Revisiting Republic v and Timaeus 41e3-44d2 and 86b1-92c3” co-authored with Chelsea Harry, Apeiron (2016) 49: 261-280
- “When Time is Accidental” co-authored with Chelsea Harry, in Le temps chez Aristote, ed. by L. Couloubaritsis et al., Paris: Vrin, 2015
- “Aristotle and Principlism in Bioethics” co-authored with Joseph Cimakasky, Diametros, September 2015. 45: 59-70
- “The gods’ horses and tripartite souls in Plato’s Phaedrus” co-authored with David Hoinski, Rhizomata fall 2014, 2: 139-160
- “Giving Justice its Due” 151-179 in Cambridge Companion to Aristotle’s Nicomachean Ethics, 2014
- “Counting Hypotheses in Plato’s Parmenides” co-authored with Joseph Cimakasky, Apeiron (2012) 46: 229-243
- “Descartes’ ‘Provisional Morality’” co-authored with Joseph Cimakasky, Pacific Philosophical Quarterly September 2012, 93: 353-372
- "Function, Ability, and Desire in Plato's Republic" co-authored with Antonis Coumoundouros in volume honoring G.X. Santas, Philosophical Inquiry Spring 2008, 1–14.
- "Plot, Disease, and Bioethics" co-authored with Gabe Solomon M.D., Philosophical Inquiry Supplementary Volume Fall 2007, 29:154-169.
- "Mistakes, Chance and Bioethics" co-authored with Gabe Solomon M.D., Philosophical Inquiry Supplementary Volume Fall 2007, 29: 170–182.
- "The Bad Is Last but Does Not Last: Aristotle's Metaphysics Y 9" co-authored with Emily Katz, Oxford Studies in Ancient Philosophy November 2006, 31: 233–242.
- "The Enduring Charm of Plato's Unwritten Doctrines" co-authored with Patrick Macfarlane, Philosophy, Competition and the Good Life. Vol 2. K. Boudouris and Kostas Kalimtzis editors. Ionia Publications: Athens, 2005, 262–271.
- "The Logic of Socratic Inquiry: Illustrated by Plato's Charmides" co-authored with Mark Brouwer, Socrates: 2400 Years Since His Death, International Symposium Proceedings, Vassilis Karasmais ed. European Cultural Center of Delphi, 2004, 233–245.
- "Disability in Earlier Greek Philosophers" co-authored with Patrick Macfarlane, Skepsis 15: 2004, 25–41.
- "Moral Virtue and Megalopsychia " co-authored with James Stover, Ancient Philosophy 23: 2003, 351–359.
- "Variety of Socratic Elenchi" co-authored with Micheele Carpenter in Gary A. Scott ed., Does Socrates Have a Method?: Rethinking the Elenchus in Plato's Dialogues and Beyond, Pennsylvania State University Press, 2002, 89–100.
- "Politeia is Aristotle's 'Best Constitution'" Iphitos 1: 2000, 59–70.

== See also ==
- American philosophy
- List of American philosophers
