= Andrew Freeman =

Andrew Freeman may refer to:

- Andrew Freeman (inventor) (1909–1996) American electrical engineer and the inventor of the electric block heater for automobiles
- Andrew Freeman (musician), American singer

== See also ==
- Andrew Freedman, owner of the New York Giants, 1895–1902
- Andrew Friedman (disambiguation)
