= Andrew Ferguson =

Andrew or Drew Ferguson may refer to:

- Drew Ferguson (politician) (born 1966), American politician; U.S. representative from Georgia
- Drew Ferguson (soccer) (born 1957), former Canadian soccer player
- Andrew Ferguson (journalist) (born 1956), American journalist
- Andrew Ferguson (rugby union) (born 1992), Canadian rugby union player
- Andrew Guthrie Ferguson (fl. 1990s–2020s), American professor of law
- Andy Ferguson (born 1985), Scottish footballer
- Andrew N. Ferguson (born 1986), chairman of the U.S. Federal Trade Commission
- Sir Andrew Ferguson, 1st Baronet (1761–1808), Anglo-Irish banker and politician

== See also ==
- Andrew Ferguson Neil (born 1949), Scottish journalist and broadcaster
