= James Drew =

James Drew may refer to:

- James Drew (cricketer) (1872–1944), Australian cricketer
- James B. Drew (1877–1953), Chief Justice
- J. B. C. Drew (James Brackett Creighton Drew, 1843–1924), Florida attorney general
- James Syme Drew (1883–1955), British Army officer
