= Christopher Drew =

Christopher Drew may refer to:

- Christopher Drew (journalist), U.S. investigative reporter
- Christofer Drew (born 1991), lead singer of the band Never Shout Never
