= Drew Powell =

Drew Powell may refer to:

- Drew Powell (actor) (born 1976), American actor
- Drew Powell (American football) (born 1993), American football player
