= Drew Brierley =

English cricketer

Personal information
- Full name: Drew Daniel Walsh Brierley
- Born: 26 February 1997 (age 29); Kettering, Northamptonshire, England
- Batting: Right-handed

Domestic team information
- Years: Team
- 2016–2018: Cambridge MCCU
- 2018–2019: Bedfordshire

Career statistics
Competition	First-class
Matches	2
Runs scored	12
Batting average	6.00
100s/50s	/–
Top score	12
Catches/stumpings	–/–
- Source: Cricinfo, 14 August 2020

Drew Daniel Walsh Brierley (born 27 February 1997) is an English former first-class cricketer.

Brierley was born at Kettering in February 1997. He was educated at Wellingborough School, before going up to Anglia Ruskin University. While studying at Anglia Ruskin, he made two appearances in first-class cricket for Cambridge MCCU against Nottinghamshire in 2016 and Essex in 2018, (Note: Cambridge MCCU differed from Cambridge University Cricket Club in that it was open to students at Anglia Ruskin University, whereas Cambridge University Cricket Club is exclusively for students of the constituent colleges of the University of Cambridge.) scoring 12 runs. In addition to playing first-class cricket, Brierley has also played minor counties cricket for Bedfordshire.
