= The Wannabes (TV series) =

- Genre: Sitcom
- Created by: Doreen Spicer-Dannelly
- Starring: Shaylen Carroll; Mariah Parks; Andrew Stern; Gabrielle LeMaire; Drew Reinartz; Alan Shaw; Steven J. Scott; David LaDuca
- Opening theme: "A Brand New Day, I'll Make My Way"
- Country of origin: United States
- Original language: English
- No. of seasons: 2
- No. of episodes: 26

Production
- Executive producers: Doreen Spicer-Dannelly; Christine LeMaire; Ron Stern; Ronald L. Lacy; Jeffrey Spillman; Jeffrey Stern
- Producer: Albert T. Dickerson III
- Production location: Howell, Michigan
- Camera setup: Single camera setup high definition
- Running time: 30 minutes (no commercials)
- Production companies: Spice Rack Productions, Inc. Showcase for Kids; Stern-LeMaire Productions, Inc.

Original release
- Network: Starz Kids & Family
- Release: August 9, 2009 – February 17, 2011

The Wannabes is an American television sitcom, created by Doreen Spicer-Dannelly (of Disney Channel's Jump In! and The Proud Family), which follows the lives of classical performing arts high school students who want to be popstars. The six stars of the series are from the pop recording group, Savvy. Despite not having been produced or filmed in Australia, the series premiered on June 14, 2010, on both ABC1 and ABC3 in a "tween" oriented timeslot. Pay-TV channel Starz Kids & Family picked up U.S. rights.

== Plot ==
The Wannabes follows six high school students attending an arts academy boarding school in hope that they will become popstars, until they realize the oppressive academy only teaches classical music and dance. Throughout the series they face issues about their careers, normal teen lives and are always trying to avoid their mean principal at every cost because he loves detentions.

== Cast ==
- Shaylen Carroll as Shaylen Carlson
- Mariah Parks as Mariah Pettigrew
- Andrew Stern as Andrew Stark
- Gabrielle “GiGi” LeMaire as Sarah Moody
- Drew Reinartz as Drew Robinson
- Alan Shaw as Alan Taskin
- Steven J. Scott as Mr. Frank Moody
- David LaDuca as Mr. Rupert Pesckow

== Production ==
The filming for seasons 1 and 2 began on August 3, 2009 in Howell, Michigan. 26 episodes were filmed. Filming was proposed to be done in Houston, Texas. The school they film at is Parker High School campus in Michigan. The series is produced by Savvy Productions, LLC and Stern-LeMaire Productions Inc., and distributed by Bradford Licensing LLC. One of the producers, Christine LeMaire, explained the series is not going to be a Disney Channel original series, "No, it is an independent production licensed to overseas networks."

== Series overview ==
Season	Episodes	Originally aired (U.S. dates)	
Season	Episodes	Season premiere	Season finale
1	13	August 9, 2009	August 27, 2010
2	13	August 30, 2010	February 17, 2011

== Episodes ==
=== Season 1: 2009–10 ===
No. overall	No. in season	Title	Directed by	Written by	Original release date	Prod. code
1	1	"The Wannabes Are Gonna Be"	Eric Dean Seaton	Doreen Spicer-Dannelly	August 9, 2009	101
On their first day at Highlands Academy of the Arts, the gang gets in trouble for disobeying the strict curriculum. As punishment, they're sent to work at Moody's Sweet Shop where they meet Sarah and form "The Wannabes."
2	2	"Guys Rock, Girls Rule"	Eric Dean Seaton	Doreen Spicer-Dannelly	August 12, 2010	102
Egos collide when the gang can't agree on which song to sing. Mr. Moody teaches them that everyone must work together to be successful.
3	3	"Tough Cookies"	Eric Dean Seaton	Doreen Spicer-Dannelly	August 13, 2010	103
The gang thinks quitting school will expedite their rise to stardom. Mr. Moody puts them through their paces, teaching them that an education is more important than fly-by-night fame and money.
4	4	"Mall Beasts"	Greg Zekowski	Steve Trautman	August 16, 2010	104
Mr. Moody hosts a video game competition similar to Guitar Hero called "Beasts of Rock." The boys enter the contest and revel in their newfound rock 'n roll personae, an must rely on Sarah to save the day. While Mr. Moody's Sweetshop is in the middle of this musical melee, Mariah is determined to prove to Shaylen that her personality is more influential than her beauty.
5	5	"Earth Day"	Robbie Countryman	Jacqueline Davis	August 17, 2010	105
After watching a video about global warming Mariah becomes an environmental activist. When she organizes a student revolt against Mr. Pesckow's unfriendly ecological policies, reporters visit Mariah at the sweet shop to do a story on her. Things take a dramatic turn when they report on Mr. Moody's wastefulness instead. To make matters worse for Mr. Moody, Sarah has a curious secret admirer which he does not approve of.
6	6	"All About Drew"	Richard Lyons	Arthur Harris	August 18, 2010	106
Drew's ego becomes unbearable when he gets a part in a commercial. He decides to leave the band, but his star falls as quickly as it rose. Meanwhile Mariah, who's watching Mr. Pesckow's phones, misplaces his niece's pet hamster and asks Andrew, Shaylen and Sarah to help track it down.
7	7	"She Drives Me Crazy"	Greg Zekowski	Ray Lancon	August 19, 2010	107
A girl becomes enamored with Drew after overhearing him talk in a Scottish accent. She becomes obsessed with him. After he breaks up with her, she's determined to reveal The Wannabes secret identity. Meanwhile, Mr. Moody is swamped with a convention of elderly women called "The Sunshine Ladies" and Sarah reminisces with a few former singers.
8	8	"The Last Tango at Highlands"	Eric Dean Seaton	Suzanne Gangursky	August 20, 2010	108
Worried she'll fail her dance final, Shaylen gets a tutor, who happens to be Andrew dressed as his alter-ego, "Santiago." And when Sarah helps Alan find his iPod, she uses her detective skills to track down her dad's recipe thief.
9	9	"Art School of Hard Knocks"	Eric Dean Seaton	George Blake	August 23, 2010	109
Sarah gets accepted into the Highlands Academy "Prep Program" as a dance major. After Mr. Moody gives her a new cell phone, she quickly gets into trouble with Mr. Pesckow and causes problems for The Wannabes. She has a lot to learn in staying out of trouble and fitting in with The Wannabes at school.
10	10	"The Candidate"	Richard Lyons	Chad Drew	August 24, 2010	110
Alan decides to run for class president but the popularity goes to his head and he loses focus on what's really important for the school causing a rift between him and Shaylen. Sarah comes up with an idea to help feed homeless and struggles with not getting recognition from the others.
11	11	"The Plays The Thing"	Robbie Countryman	George Blake	August 25, 2010	111
An alumnus of Highlands Academy returns to give a sizable endowment to the school during the annual freshman play but when her prized jewels go missing, the gang must find the thief before Mr. Pesckow gives them all a life sentence to detention.
12	12	"Haunted Highlands"	William Dear	Chad Drew	August 26, 2010	112
The gang gets trapped in the school after helping Andrew film a horror movie for a short film contest and life begins to imitate art as the gang gets "scared straight."
13	13	"Dance Revolution"	Alfonso Ribeiro	Arthur Harris	August 27, 2010	113
Andrew suspects that there's a secret society within the walls of Highlands Academy. He and the gang investigate and discover an underground dance club run by Alan. Alan explains that it's reserved for the best dancers in the school and if the gang wants to join, they have to challenge and beat one of the club's dance crews. Sarah experiences receiving special attention as Mr. Moody is called to the school cafeteria to help out.

=== Season 2: 2010–2011 ===
No. overall	No. in season	Title	Directed by	Written by	Original release date	Prod. code
14	1	"Space Invaders"	Robbie Countryman	George Blake & Steve Trautmann	August 30, 2010	114
When Highlands is forced to host a nearby sports academy, the boys challenge them to a basketball game.
15	2	"Playful Platypus"	Robbie Countryman	Arthur Harris	August 31, 2010	115
A wealthy customer rents out Moody's Sweet Shop for her son's Australian-themed birthday party, forcing the gang to dress up and entertain the unentertainable kid.
16	3	"Break/Dance"	Robbie Countryman	Steve Trautmann & George Blake	September 1, 2010	116
The Spring Dance has arrived and Andrew's been put in charge. While the gang worries about who they are going to take to the dance, real problems arise when Andrew forgets to book a band. Now it is up to The Wannabes to save the dance.
17	4	"Whacky Manager"	William Dear	Suzanne Gangursky	September 2, 2010	117
The gang believes that their dreams have come true when a local club owner asks them to perform at his club across town.
18	5	"Indirect TV"	Robbie Countryman	Arthur Harris	September 3, 2010	118
After Sarah is quarantined for having a mysterious illness, the only thing she can do is watch television. She begins to see her friends' lives play out in several television genres, including Drew's newfound crush on Shaylen. Note: The title of this episode, "Indirect TV", is a parody of the cable television service Direct TV.
19	6	"Prank Wars"	Alfonso Ribeiro	George Blake & Steve Trautmann	September 6, 2010	119
After pulling a prank on Andrew, a full-blown prank war is ignited. He and Sarah join forces to get back at the guys. Meanwhile, Mariah and Shaylen get in on the pranks after both lie about auditioning for the school play.
20	7	"The Plagiarist" (Part 1)	Robbie Countryman	Steve Trautmann & George Blake	September 7, 2010	120
Alan decides to spend the day at the carnival instead of writing his sonata. Out of time, Alan decides to steal an obscure piece off the Internet to turn in. Meanwhile, trouble arises on Sarah's first date.
21	8	"The Plagiarist" (Part 2)	Richard Lyons	George Blake & Steve Trautmann	September 8, 2010	121
Alan and the gang reminisce over their time together at Highlands the night before a hearing that just may keep Alan in school.
22	9	"Stuck in the Mall"	William Dear	Chad Drew	September 9, 2010	122
After a petting zoo runs wild in the mall, trapping the gang in the sweet shop, the gang must deal with their fears, having fantasies about their futures.
23	10	"Internet Sensation"	Robbie Countryman	Doreen Spicer-Dannelly	February 14, 2011	123
When a video of the kids performing is accidentally uploaded to the web, their secret is jeopardized. Mr. Pesckow is on the lookout for the Highlands students he believes are in the video. Before the gang decides to come clean, several doppelganger groups appear.
24	11	"Beyond The Music"	Robbie Countryman	Arthur Harris	February 15, 2011	124
The gang argues over who is coolest of them all. They use the footage from their concert to prove it.
25	12	"Classroom Musical" (Part 1)	Robbie Countryman	George Blake & Steve Trautmann	February 16, 2011	125
In an homage to classic and current musicals, the gang deals with the drudgery of detention through music and dance along with fellow student detainees.
26	13	"Classroom Musical" (Part 2)	Robbie Countryman	Doreen Spicer-Dannelly	February 17, 2011	126
The detention drama gets ramped up as Mr. Pesckow relieves our gang from their service at Mr. Moody's. They are forced to find a way back into his "bad" graces so The Wannabes as a group and can continue to perform at Mr. Moody's.

== International broadcasts ==
Country	Channel
Australia	ABC3
United States	Starz Kids & Family
Israel	Noga
Spain	Cartoon Network
Germany	Super RTL
Portugal	SIC K
Argentina	HBO Family
Mexico	HBO Family
Chile	HBO Family
North Macedonia	MKRTV
Poland	teleTOON+
Romania	Megamax
India	HBO Family
Indonesia	HBO Family
Italy	Frisbee
United Arab Emirates	e-Junior
Portugal	SIC K
Italy	Italia

== Related shows ==
- Kids Incorporated
- Hannah Montana
- Saved By the Bell
