= Robert Drew (disambiguation) =

Robert Drew (1924–2014) was an American filmmaker.

Robert Drew may also refer to:

- Robert Drew (politician) (1575–1645), English politician
- Robert Drew Associates

== See also ==
- Robert Drewe (born 1943), Australian writer
- Robert Drew Hicks (1850–1929), British scholar
- Robert Drews (born 1936), American historian
