= Drewe =

Drewe is a surname of English origin. The name refers to:

- Anthony Drewe (contemporary), British lyricist and author
- Sir Cedric Drewe, KCVO (1896–1971), British politician; MP 1924–55 and a Knight Commander of the Royal Victorian Order
- John Drewe (b. 1948), British purveyor of art forgeries
- Julius Drewe (1856–1931), British businessman, retailer and entrepreneur
- Robert Drewe (b. 1943), Australian journalist and novelist
- Drewe family of Broadhembury, in Devon, England
