= Drew Smith =

Drew Smith can refer to:-

- Drew Smith (food writer), British food writer
- Drew Smith (politician), Scottish politician
- Drew Smith (baseball) (born 1993), American MLB pitcher
- Drew Nellins Smith, American writer

== See also ==
- Andrew Smith (disambiguation)
