= Drew Tal =

- דרור טולידאנו
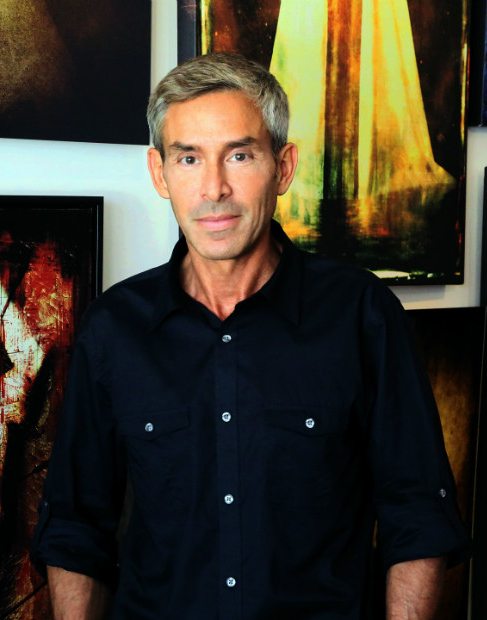
- Drew Tal, 2013
- Born: Dror Toledano; October 7, 1957 (age 67); Haifa, Israel
- Education: Bosmat (Technion's Junior Technical College)
- Known for: Photography
- Notable work: Worlds Apart; Facing East; Porcelain Dynasty (art collections)
- Website: drewtal.com

Drew Tal (Hebrew: דרור טולידאנו Dror Toledano; born October 7, 1957) is an artist and photographer living and working in New York City. His work has been exhibited globally and is included in the permanent collections of museums such as the Norton Museum of Art and New Britain Museum of American Art. His work is also in collections at the Ecole Internationale de New York, the J. Steinbecker collection, the Robbins, Foreman and Gallery Swanstrom collections, Ur Arts & Culture Inc, as well as the Cooper Gallery collection.

== Early years ==
Tal was born as Dror Toledano on October 7, 1957, in the Mediterranean coastal city of Haifa, Israel. Tal attended Geula Elementary School (גאולה ספר בית) and then Bosmat (ת"בסמ, Technion's Junior Technical College), studying architecture, engineering, and interior design. Between 1976 and 1979, Tal served in the Israel Defense Forces as a tank commander in the 77th Armor Brigade on the Golan Heights, as well as on the Sinai Peninsula, the Gaza Strip and the Suez Canal.

== Career ==
In 1981, Tal moved to New York and worked in the fashion industry, first as a make-up artist for noted fine art photographers (such as Kenn Duncan), then as a manager and designer for Lynda Joy Couture, where he started his fashion-photography career.

Between 1993 and 2005 Tal worked as a freelance art, fashion and fitness photographer, doing editorial shoots and advertising campaigns for numerous fashion magazines, fashion houses, art and fitness publications.

From 2005 Tal has focused on his art and since 2006 he has been represented worldwide by Emmanuel Fremin Gallery and in Santa Fe by Carroll Turner Gallery, Santa-Fe, NM and Mark Hachem Gallery, Paris. His work has been exhibited in numerous fine art galleries and museums worldwide, as well as in art fairs in New York, The Hamptons, Miami, West Palm Beach, Santa Fe, Dallas, Chicago and prestigious international art fairs in Dubai, Hong-Kong, Istanbul, Toronto and Singapore.

In 2013, his series of works entitled "Worlds Apart" was showcased as a solo show at Rezan Has Museum in Istanbul, Turkey for the Istanbul Biennial. In 2015, "Worlds Apart" was showcased as a solo show at Mark Hachem Gallery in Paris and at La Maison de la Photographie in Lille, France.

Tal considers the human being as the main subject in his work which revolves around ethnic subject matter, particularly ethnic faces and eyes.

He lives and works in Manhattan and divides his time between New York City, Miami Beach and Nice, France.

== Gallery ==
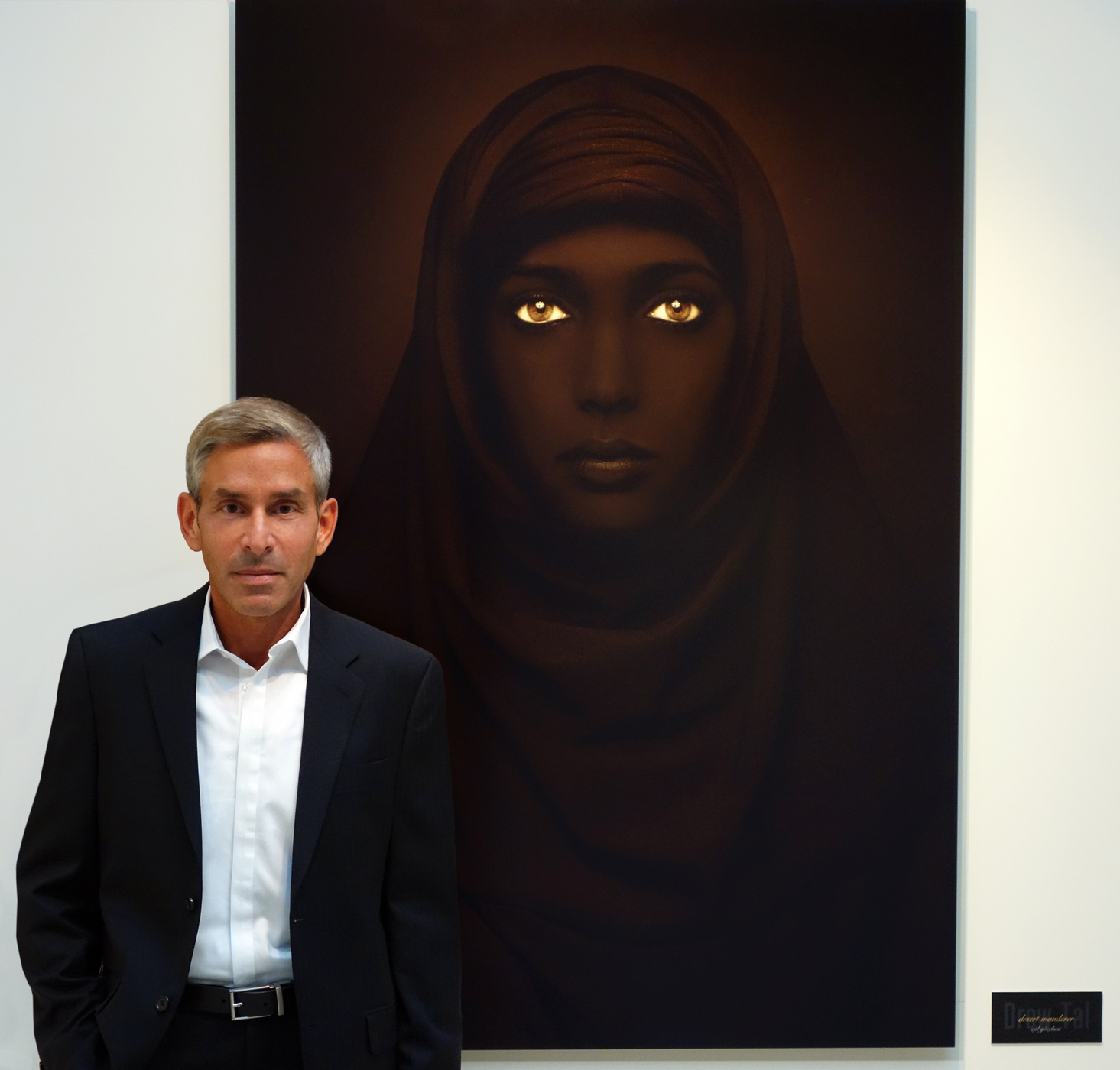
Tal exhibiting his work entitled "Desert Wanderer" at Rezan Has Museum in Istanbul Turkey for the Istanbul Biennial

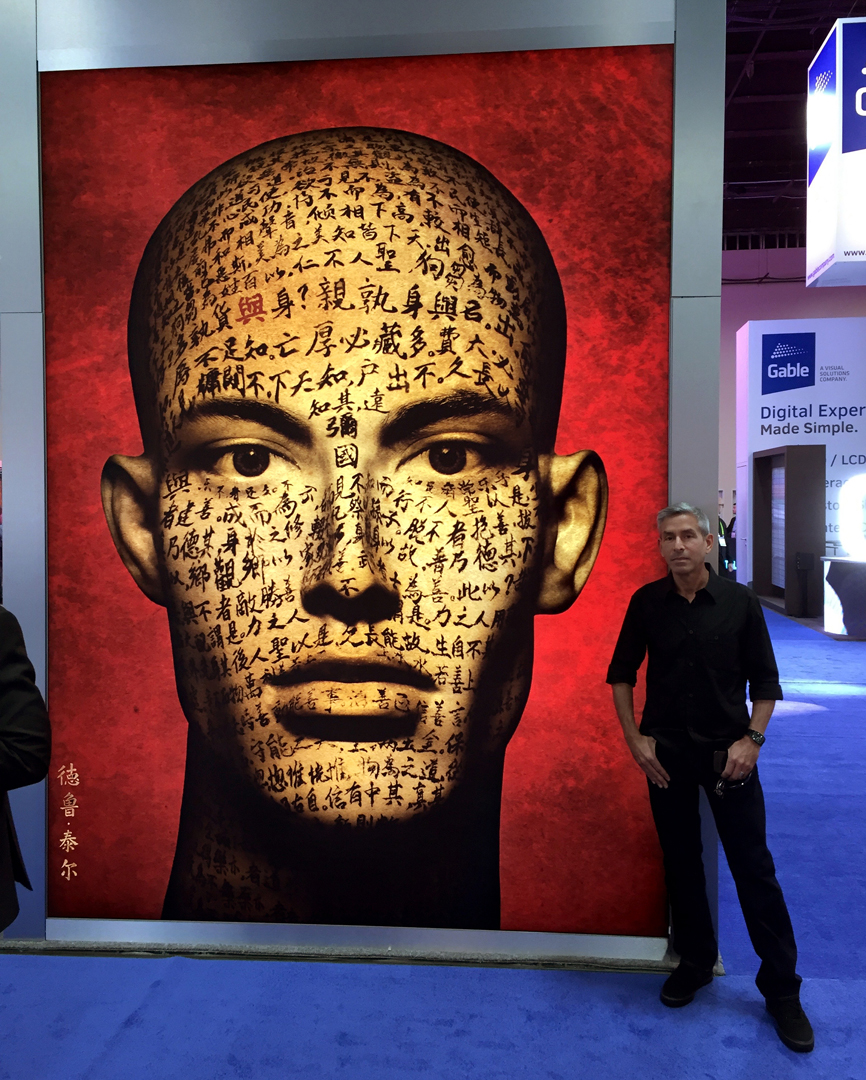
Tal exhibiting his work entitled "FaceBook of Tao" at the GlobalShop 2016 convention in Las Vegas

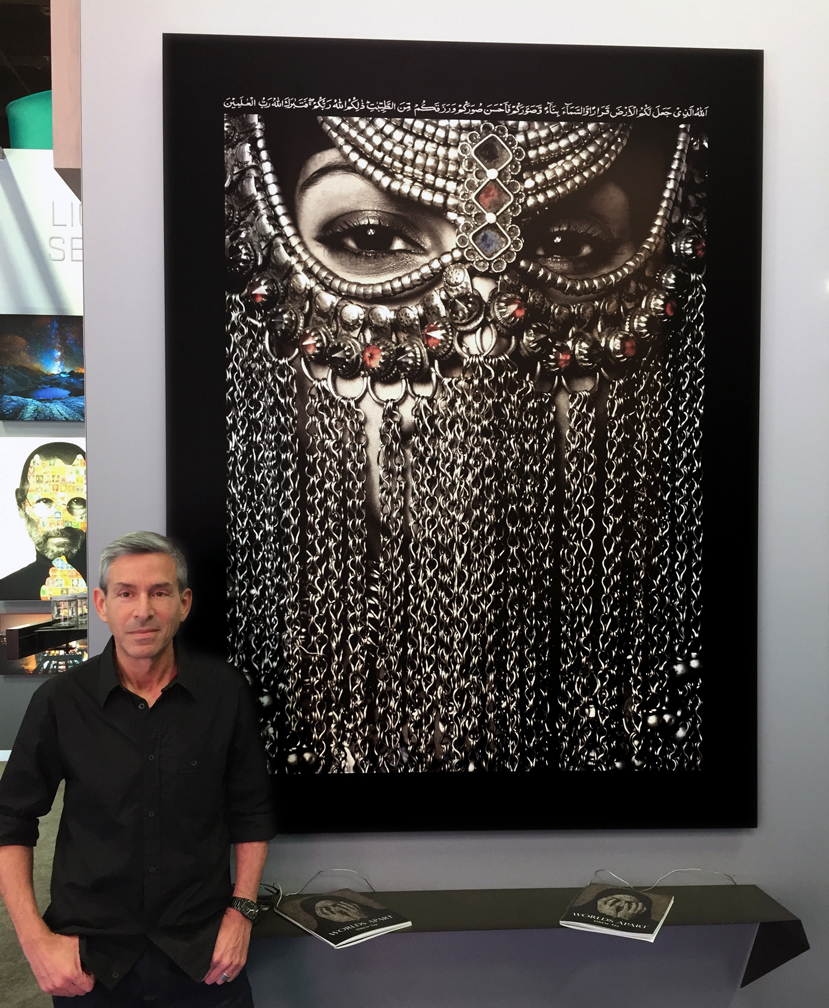
Tal exhibiting his work entitled "Silence" at the GlobalShop 2016 convention in Las Vegas
