= Drew Friedman =

Drew Friedman may refer to:

- Drew "Dru-Ha" Friedman, music executive
- Drew Friedman (cartoonist) (born 1958), American cartoonist and illustrator

== See also ==
- Andrew Friedman (disambiguation)
