= Drew Kunz =

American poet (born 1969)

Drew Kunz (born December 9, 1969) is an American poet, artist, yoga teacher, and photographer.

Kunz was born in Waukesha, Wisconsin. After a year at the Milwaukee Institute of Art and Design, Kunz transferred to the University of Wisconsin–Milwaukee to pursue both Comparative Study of Religion and Comparative Literature degrees. While in Milwaukee, Kunz and the poet Stacy Szymaszek edited the literary journal Traverse from 1999 to 2004. Since 2005, he has been involved with various projects, including the chapbook imprints g o n g press and tir aux pigeons as well as a bimonthly mail-out called SERIES. Kunz also had been a member of the Subtext Collective, a Seattle based literary group no longer active. Since his sons birth, Kunz has taught yoga and has had work in multiple showings, oftentimes alongside his friend and fellow artist Patrick Gulke.

== Personal life ==
Drew Kunz currently lives with his family in Suquamish (dkʼʷsuqʼʷabš) located within the Port Madison Indian Reservation in Washington State.

== Bibliography ==
- Tether (Dusie Kollektiv, 2007)
- Tether (GAMMM, 2008, bilingual edition)
- Terminals (tir aux pigeons, 2008)
