= Drew Johansen =

American diving coach

Drew Johansen is an American diving coach. He served as coach of the USA diving team for the 2012 London Olympics, 2016 Rio Olympics, and 2020 Tokyo Olympics. He is also Indiana University's diving head coach.
