= Drew Nelson =

Drew Nelson may refer to:

- Drew Nelson (politician) (1956–2016), Northern Irish Protestant political figure
- Drew Nelson (musician), Canadian blues singer, guitarist and songwriter
- Drew Nelson (actor) (born 1979), Canadian actor and voice actor
- Drew Nelson (footballer), Scottish footballer

== See also ==
- Andrew Nelson (disambiguation)
