= Drew Ellis =

Drew Ellis may refer to:

- Drew Ellis (American football) (1914–1988), American football player
- Drew Ellis (baseball) (born 1995), American baseball player
