= Drew Shiflett =

American visual artist

- Born: 1951 (age 74–75); Chicago, Illinois, U.S.
- Education: Maryland Institute College of Art, Columbia College Chicago
- Known for: Drawing, sculpture, relief, collage
- Spouse: Moses V. Chao
- Awards: Guggenheim Fellowship, Anonymous Was A Woman Award, New York Foundation for the Arts
- Website: Drew Shiflett

Drew Shiflett, Untitled #98, watercolor, graphite, canvas, canvas threads, cheesecloth and handmade paper, 52" x 57" x 1", 2023.

Drew Shiflett (born 1951) is an American visual artist based in New York. She is known for layered, collaged paper and fabric constructions that straddle drawing, relief and sculpture. These handmade, hybrid works, which she terms "constructed drawings," offer subtle examinations of surface, structure and texture through their attention to materials, intuitive processes, and loose patterning. They consist of monochromatic, interwoven sections of handmade paper and fabric upon which she draws repetitive and sectioned lines and marks, producing meditative, quilt-like "grids of grids." Writing about her later work, critic Raphael Rubinstein observed, "One of the pleasures of Shiflett's art is being able to follow her process step by step, relishing the care with which each element has been positioned, the unpredictable but somehow always apposite interruptions of patterning. Employing a distinctive eccentric modularity, [she] lets each of her wall pieces develop gradually."

Shiflett received a Guggenheim Fellowship in 1992 and the Anonymous Was A Woman Award in 2023. Her work has been exhibited at venues including the Drawing Center, Baltimore Museum of Art, SculptureCenter, Weatherspoon Art Museum, Kentucky Museum of Art and Craft and Kunststiftung K52 (Berlin).

== Life and career ==
Shiflett was born in Chicago, Illinois in 1951. She studied art at Columbia College Chicago (BA, 1974) and earned an MFA from the Hoffberger School of Painting at the Maryland Institute College of Art in 1978.

After graduating and turning to sculpture, Shiflett received recognition for solo exhibitions at New York venues such as Fashion Moda (1983), White Columns (1984) and The InterArt Center (1993), and group shows at Art in General, Artists Space, SculptureCenter and the Snug Harbor Cultural Center, among others. In the 2000s, she has had solo exhibitions at the Islip Art Museum (2004), the Lesley Heller Gallery in New York (2006–18), and the Drawing Room (2010), Guild Hall Museum (2011) and Arts Center at Duck Creek in East Hampton, NY (2022).

She is based in New York City and East Hampton.

== Work and reception ==
Shiflett's art, including her sculpture, has been rooted in drawing. In the first half of her career, she produced reliefs and sculptures made of wood, repurposed paper products, cloth, Styrofoam, polyester stuffing and papier-mâché, among other materials. She began exploring handmade paper in the early 2000s and has since focused on her constructed drawings made with interwoven or glued paper, cheesecloth and canvas. Trademark characteristics of both bodies of work include: an improvisational approach to raw materials; a layering of elements that suggests weaving; obsessive, repetitive processes of both construction and mark-making; and a generally non-objective approach to imagery that is nonetheless open to multiple associations and references.

Critics have related her art to the minimalist works of Agnes Martin, Robert Ryman and Alan Shields, as well as to post-minimalist and feminist artists that employ self-invented processes based in the craft and domestic realms, such as Eva Hesse, Lee Bontecou and Ruth Asawa.

Drew Shiflett, Easel Sculpture #2, paper, fabric, glue, cardboard, wood, polyester stuffing, Styrofoam and wire, 54" x 43" x 24", 2000.

=== Sculptural works: 1984–2006 ===
In the first two decades of her career, Shiflett produced a wide range of three-dimensional work, including large reliefs, boat- or coffin-like structures, and intricate constructions likened to "mythical worlds or interior architectures" and "bricolage landscapes." These sculptures were distinguished by their layering of diverse raw materials and low-tech, DIY approach to construction. In them, she often created contrasts between the deliberate messiness of her assembly and the "pristine" monochromatics of her materials (e.g., Styrofoam and tulle), as well as between the building of volume out of largely one-dimensional (planar) materials.

Shiflett's constructions from the 1980s ranged from purely abstract to figurative works, such as Big Fish (1985), a massive, textured relief of acrylic, wood and paper that included a cameo-like, graphic portrait of a large fish and a smallish couple. In the next decade, vaguely architectural and mechanistic allusions and materials such as Styrofoam and polyester stuffing came to the fore. These pieces alternated between whimsical, assemblage-like pieces such as Hairy Pink (1990, described as displaying "a bold Gustonian goofiness") and elaborate, spatially complex sculptures elastic enough to evoke both ghost-like holy places and three-dimensional abstract paintings (e.g., Castle/Cutout, 1993). Critic Nancy Princenthal elaborated on this quality, writing, "Though Shiflett's additive process is slow and laborious, its object is not settled contours or stable mass but rather rough-hewn forms that seem as structurally and psychologically fluid as a contemporary city."

Shiflett laid her later sculptures on the floor or draped them over frames suggesting looms or easels. Despite having the volume of heavy drapery, they were described as airy and weightless, with a vocabulary of parallel hatching that became central to her constructed drawings. Tongues (2000) offered a range of allusions with appendage-like forms that resembled levers, pedals or architectural details; Easel Sculpture #2 (2000) was a wry navigation of the space between picture and object, in both form and title.

=== Constructed drawings ===
Drew Shiflett, Untitled #53, graphite, ink, watercolor, Conté crayon, and handmade paper, 25.5" x 47.5" x 0.5", 2008.

Shiflett's "constructed drawings" date back to the early 2000s. They marry relief, collage and drawing. She assembles them in variegated, layered grids of handmade paper and cheesecloth that she interweaves and joins with glue and paper pulp. She then painstakingly draws delicate grids of tremulous, repeated marks, lines and horizontal color bands on the structures (using graphite, ink, Conté crayon or watercolor), which coalesce into translucent, rhythmic scrims of soft organic geometry. The patterning varies, shifting between all-over effects, dense and diffuse passages, or sections pieced together patchwork-style.

Critics characterize Shiflett's approach as both intuitive and deliberate, with a sense of rigor and precision in its mark-making and an embrace of "messy, awkward improvisation" and serendipity (e.g., Untitled #53, 2008). Peter Frank noted, "Despite the artist's clearly work-intensive methods of assembly, the physical result of these methods is light and delicate and seemingly effortless." Shiflett develops each piece organically, leaving visible evidence of her additions, subtractions and construction idiosyncrasies such as buckling and stratification. Her muted chromatic and tonal range accentuates the work's lively, puckered surfaces, rhythms, textures and subtle atmosphere. Raphael Rubinstein observed, "Her symphonies of whites—accented with sepias, grays and, crucially, the shadows cast by the cross-laid strips of paper or canvas—place no interfering substance, no distracting color between our eyes and the raw materials."

While abstract, the constructed drawings vary widely in their allusions (e.g., Untitled #98, 2023); among those discussed are architectural tableaux (e.g., colonnades, doorways or arches), landscapes, woven materials and layered strata of geological time. Critics have likened rippling, inscribed works such as Untitled #62 (2011) or Untitled #66 (2012) to tattersall plaids or seersucker fabric, for example, and noted affinities between their fine, slightly wavering lines and thread; Newsday termed other works "pseudo-textiles" or "iced tapestries." At a more analytical level, writers identify a complex interplay between inner structure and tactile surface (image)—a distinction which is sometimes eclipsed—that her work shares with woven materials. In 2009, dArt International compared the obsessively sprawling demarcations—loosely sectioned by underlying geometric shapes—in Shiflett's exhibition at Lesley Heller to bits of ancient tapestry or Greco-Roman ruins (e.g., a coliseum, bridge or water conduit) parched by sun and time. The review remarked, "They hold a meditative solemnity; there is an understated eloquence to the repetitive act of their improvisational creation that is ruminative like a visual mantra."

Reviews of subsequent shows at Guild Hall Museum (2011) and Lesley Heller (2012, 2017) expanded on these themes, noting the work's mode of marking time in ways that suggested timelessness and language. Art in America's Elisa Decker commented, "Shiflett's drawings provide a metaphor for the human condition; they are contained, yet they have an expansive quality that suggests they could go on and on." Curator Janet Goleas has suggested that Shiflett's fields of horizontality reflected the influence of the written word on her apprehension of structure. Not surprisingly, several writers liken her mark-making to a private formal lexicon—of runes, topographical symbols, tally marks—or a computational language seemingly readable, yet resistant to being deciphered. The patch-like and bandage-like details of some later works have been described as evoking treasured artifacts (like the informational textiles of the Incas or African kente cloth), passed down and continually repaired.

== Recognition ==
Shiflett has received a John Simon Guggenheim Memorial Foundation (1992), the Anonymous Was A Woman Award (2023), and grants from the New York Foundation for the Arts (1990, 2009, for sculpture and drawing respectively) and Mid Atlantic Arts Foundation/National Endowment for the Arts (1993, for sculpture). Her work belongs to private and public collections that include the Baltimore Museum of Art, Francis J. Greenburger Collection, Guild Hall Museum and Islip Art Museum.
