= Drew Baglino =

Former Tesla powertrain and energy engineering head

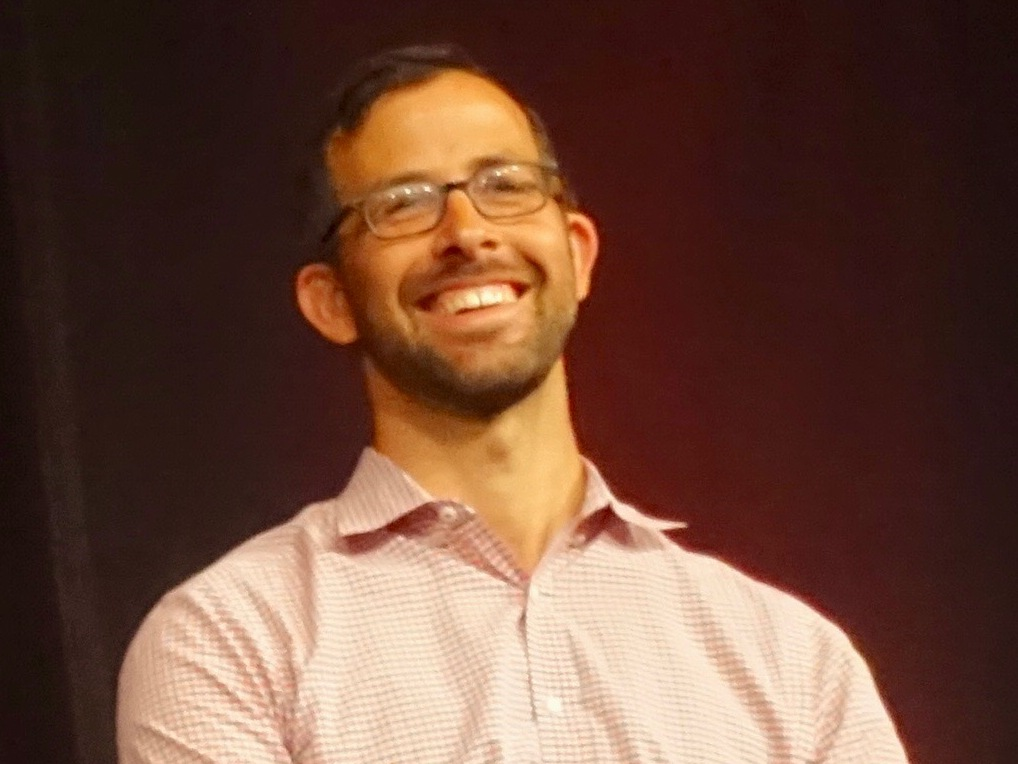
- Baglino in 2019
- Born: Andrew David Baglino
- Education: Stanford University
- Years active: 2004‒

Andrew David "Drew" Baglino is an American engineer and manufacturing industry executive working in the field of new energy. Before he resigned in April 2024, Baglino was an executive officer at Tesla, Inc. serving as the Senior Vice President of Powertrain and Energy Engineering.

== Career ==
While studying at Stanford University in the early-2000s Baglino undertook research on hydrogen as a transport fuel in New Zealand. Upon finishing at Stanford, Baglino received a bachelor's degree in electrical engineering, and became a research assistant at Resources for the Future.

Baglino moved to Tesla in 2006 as an electrical engineer in San Carlos, California. At Tesla, he worked on digital test equipment and motor controller firmware leading to performance improvements on the 2008 Tesla Roadster. Baglino designed the dual motor system for the Tesla Model S, and powertrain control algorithms. By November 2014, Baglino was director of engineering for Tesla Energy. By 2015, he was also leading the electrical and control side for Tesla grid-tied battery products. By 2019, Baglino was an executive officer at Tesla serving as the Senior Vice President of Powertrain and Energy Engineering.

On April 15, 2024, Baglino resigned from Tesla, and openly announced his decision on X at midnight the following day. According to a filing with the SEC, after his departure from the company Baglino has sold 1.14 million of his shares worth $181.5 million, listing an "approximate date of sale" of April 25.
