= Daniel Drew (disambiguation) =

Daniel Drew (1797–1879) was an American financier.

Daniel Drew may also refer to:

- Dan Drew (politician) (born 1979), American politician
- Dan Drew (hurler) (1863–1923), Irish hurler
- Danny Drew, see 2006 League of Ireland
- Daniel Drew (rugby union) (1850–1914), Scottish rugby player
- Daniel Drew (cricketer) (born 1996), Australian cricketer
