= Drew Miller (disambiguation) =

Drew Miller may refer to:

- Drew Miller (born 1984), American ice hockey player
- Drew Miller (offensive lineman) (born 1985), American football player
- Drew Miller (quarterback) (born 1978), American football player
