= James Drew (cricketer) =

Australian cricketer

Personal information
- Born: 20 January 1872; Melbourne, Australia
- Died: 22 January 1944 (aged 72); Maryborough, Victoria, Australia

Domestic team information
- Years: Team
- 1900: Victoria
- Source: Cricinfo, 31 July 2015

James Drew (20 January 1872 – 22 January 1944) was an Australian cricketer. He played one first-class cricket match for Victoria in 1900.

== See also ==
- List of Victoria first-class cricketers
