= Andrew Nelson (volleyball) =

Canadian volleyball player (born 1993)

Personal information
- Full name: Andrew Nels Nelson
- Nickname: Nelly
- Born: July 27, 1993 (age 33); Regina, Saskatchewan, Canada
- Hometown: Regina, Saskatchewan, Canada
- Height: 2.00 m (6 ft 7 in)
- Weight: 90.5 kg (200 lb)
- Spike: 350 cm (138 in)
- Block: 330 cm (130 in)
- Education: University of Regina; University of Saskatchewan

Volleyball information
- Position: Outside hitter
- Current club: University of Saskatchewan
- Number: 7

Career
Years	Teams
2011–2014; 2014–	University of Regina; University of Saskatchewan

National team
2012	Canada U21
- Last updated: 29 Nov 2016

Andrew Nels Nelson (born July 27, 1993) is a male Canadian volleyball athlete. He was a member of the Canada men's junior national team at the 2012 Men's Junior NORCECA Volleyball Championship.

== Sporting achievements ==
=== Individual awards ===
- 2011/2012 Canada West Men's Volleyball - Rookie of the Year
- 2011/2012 CIS Men's Volleyball - Rookie of the Year
- 2011/2012 CIS Men's Volleyball - All-Rookie Team
- 2011/2012 University of Regina - Male Rookie of the Year
