= George Drew =

George Drew may refer to:

- George Franklin Drew (1827–1900), governor of Florida
- George Alexander Drew (Liberal-Conservative MP) (1826–1891), Canadian political figure
- George A. Drew (1894–1973), Premier of Ontario (1942–1948), leader of the Progressive Conservative Party of Canada (1948–1956)
- George Smith Drew (1819–1880), Hulsean lecturer
- George C. Drew, British experimental psychologist
