= Drew Residence =

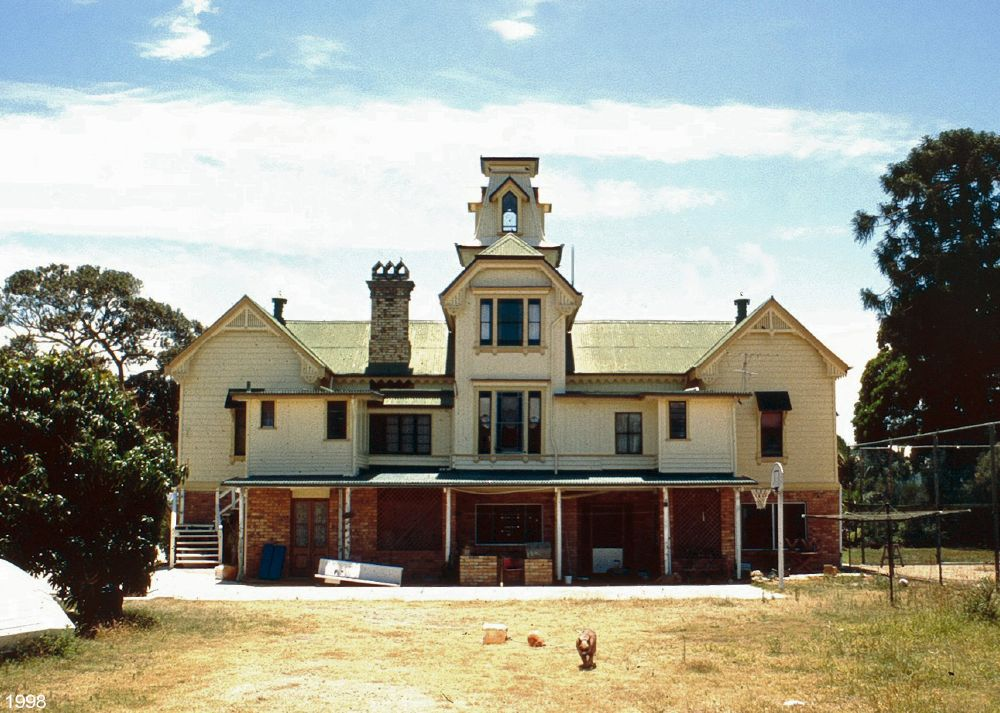
- Drew Residence, 1998

- Location within Queensland Location within Australia
- 27.33°S 153.075°E
- Location: 20 Wharf Street, Shorncliffe, City of Brisbane, Queensland, Australia

History
- Design period: 1870s–1890s (late 19th century)
- Built: 1890s–1940s

Site notes
- Architect: Samuel Drew

Queensland Heritage Register
- Official name: Drew Residence (former), Samuel Drew's House
- Type: state heritage (built, landscape)
- Designated: 24 November 2000
- Reference no.: 602024
- Significant period: 1890s–1940s (fabric, historical)
- Significant components: slipway, residential accommodation – main house, attic, basement / sub-floor, views from, tower – observation/lookout, roof/ridge ventilator/s / fleche/s
- Builders: Samuel Drew

Drew Residence is a heritage-listed detached house at 20 Wharf Street, Shorncliffe, City of Brisbane, Queensland, Australia. It was designed by Samuel Drew and built from 1890s to 1940s by Samuel Drew. It is also known as Samuel Drew's House and the Captain's House. It was added to the Queensland Heritage Register on 24 November 2000.

== History ==
This substantial timber residence with sub-floor, attic and tower, is understood to have been constructed in the 1890s, possibly in three stages, by American carpenters and boatbuilders Samuel Drew and his sons Albert Edward and Frederick William, as their family home. As builders, the Drews erected many houses in the Sandgate/Shorncliffe district in the late 19th and early 20th centuries, during the peak of Sandgate/Shorncliffe's popularity as a seaside resort. They established a boatbuilding enterprise (constructing mostly pleasure craft) on Cabbage Tree Creek behind 20 Wharf Street, and were well known in local sailing circles.

In the early 1850s, Brisbane commercial interests headed by Thomas Dowse and Brisbane Valley squatters John and David McConnel, promoted the establishment of a shipping centre at the head of Cabbage Tree Creek. They were in competition with rival claims for Brisbane and Cleveland as the principal port for Moreton Bay. The Village of Sandgate was officially surveyed in 1852, with the first sale of Sandgate town lots held at Brisbane in November 1853. Most of the land sold was purchased by the speculative investors behind the move to create a port at Sandgate. However, with Brisbane subsequently consolidating its position as the port for Moreton Bay, Sandgate languished. Landowner inaction, poor communication and strong Aboriginal resistance further retarded its development.

Native police were stationed at Sandgate from late 1852 until 1862 to "disperse" the Bribie Island and Ningy-Ningy peoples, and facilitate non-Indigenous occupation of the land in the Cabbage Tree Creek and Pine Rivers districts. With the removal of hostile indigenes, Sandgate/Shorncliffe developed slowly from the 1860s as a seaside excursion venue. By 1868, Cobb and Co was operating a twice-weekly service to Sandgate, and by the mid-1870s, three coach companies were offering services to the bayside resort. In the 1860s six hotels were established at Sandgate, although only two, the Sandgate and the Osborne, survived the decade. Also from the 1860s, a number of summer seaside residences and boarding or guest houses were erected, mostly along Eagle Terrace and at Shorncliffe. In the 1870s the permanent population increased, agitation for a rail link with Brisbane emerged, and municipal status was granted to the Borough of Sandgate in April 1880. With the opening of the extension of the railway from Brisbane to Sandgate in 1882 the permanent population grew rapidly, settlement spread along the flats, and weekend holiday-makers turned the township into a bustling seaside resort. The popularity of Sandgate/Shorncliffe as a seaside resort attracted day-trippers, seasonal holiday-makers and the Moreton Bay sailing fraternity, well into the 20th century.

Samuel Drew, his wife Jane Harris and family emigrated to Australia from the United States of America in the mid-1880s, and by 1887 were resident in Sandgate. They had arrived during a colonial-wide economic boom and the local flurry of development which followed the opening of the railway line to Sandgate. Drew, who was a carpenter and boatbuilder by trade, gained employment as foreman/carpenter at William Street's joinery works in Creek Street (now Palm Avenue), Sandgate, and in 1888 erected a house there, at the corner of Creek and Wharf Streets.

William Street, reputedly formerly employed by Samuel Drew in America, was by this time a prominent Sandgate builder and contractor, who erected the Sandgate Post Office in 1886–87 and the Sandgate Baptist Church in 1887, as well as many houses in the Sandgate/Shorncliffe area. Early in 1886, he had purchased over an acre of land at the southern end of Creek Street (present Palm Avenue) on the western side of the street, adjoining Cabbage Tree Creek, where his joinery works were established. Street was a Justice of the Peace, a trustee of the local cemetery, and along with Edward Barton Southerden (first Mayor of Sandgate), was joint treasurer of the Sandgate School of Arts. By 1890 William Street was in partnership with William Krimmer as proprietors of the local skating rink in Sunday Street, Shorncliffe, erected 1888–89, and Samuel Drew was manager of the rink.

During the widespread economic depression of the early 1890s, William Street was forced to liquidate his business affairs, his Creek Street property passing to his mortgagor, the Queensland National Bank, in 1893. The Drew family's 1888 house was located on this property, which in 1904 Albert Edward Drew, Samuel Drew's son, purchased from the bank. From 1889 the land west of Street's Joinery Works, along Wharf Street, was made available as residential allotments. Samuel Drew acquired title to 1 rood 22.4 perches (1,580 m^{2}) (resubdivisions 96–98 of subdivision A of allotment 3 of section 15, Village of Sandgate) of unimproved land backing onto Cabbage Tree Creek and fronting Wharf Street, in May–June 1890. The eastern boundary of this land abutted William Street's Creek Street property. According to Samuel Drew's descendants, over the next decade the Drews built their family home here in several stages: firstly the main bedrooms and sewing room, then the central section (including the tower). A stables, complete with bell tower, and a large boatshed which housed the family's boatbuilding business, were erected prior to the construction of the third stage of the house.

It is not clear whether Samuel Drew actually lived in the Wharf Street house, as through the 1890s and early 1900s he was listed in the Queensland Post Office Directories at Creek Street, Sandgate. His Wharf Street property was transferred to four of his children in 1895: Mary Ellen, Elizabeth Jane, Albert Edward and Frederick William, then in 1905 (perhaps following Albert's purchase of the Creek Street property in 1904) back to Samuel, who on the same date nominated Mary Ellen and Elizabeth Jane Drew as trustees. When Samuel Drew died in April 1907, the funeral party left from his late residence, Creek-street, Sandgate. However, by 1911 his widow, Jane, was resident in the Wharf Street house, and his unmarried daughters remained there until their deaths in the mid-20th century.

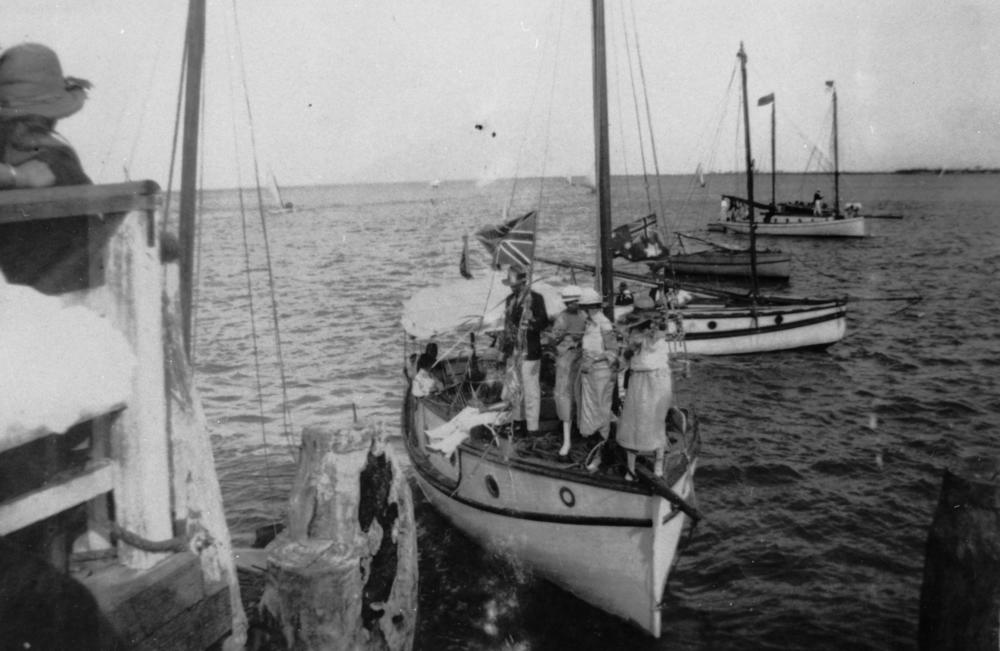
Boat made by Albert Drew at the opening of the Sandgate Sailing Club, 1922

The family understands that the sisters conducted a sewing and sail-making business from 20 Wharf Street for many years. An intriguing reference in the Queensland Post Office Directory of 1910–11 lists "Drews Sanatorium Home for Infants" at Sandgate – whether the Drew daughters ever used their home for this purpose has not been established. In 1918–19 Samuel John Drew (Samuel Drew's youngest son) built a house for himself at 19 Wharf Street. He and his brother Albert Edward, who continued to live in the 1888 house at the corner of Wharf Street and Palm Avenue (formerly Creek Street), maintained the family boatbuilding business from the boatshed at the rear of 20 Wharf Street until the 1930s depression, when Samuel leased his house and moved to Toowoomba. Albert and fellow boat builder and relative, Theo Woodhead, constructed the last boat in 1948, the year in which Albert died. Albert Drew, known locally as "Skipper" Drew, was a foundation member of the Sandgate Yacht Club, established in 1912, and was well known in local sailing circles. He won many sailing titles on Moreton Bay, in craft he had built himself.

In 1947, prior to Elizabeth's death in 1950, Samuel John Drew and his son Oliver, also a builder, repaired and repainted 20 Wharf Street in white and several different shades of grey, believed to be the original colours. At this time they removed an early hedge and fence, replacing them with a smaller wrought iron fence. As the original timber gates were in poor condition, replicas were constructed in their place. In 1952, 20 Wharf Street suffered slight damage by a cyclone, and decorative fretwork across the ridge of the tower was blown away.

Following Elizabeth Drew's death in 1957, the residence was transferred to Samuel John Drew and William Roy Drew (son of Frederick William Drew and Samuel Drew's grandson). As both had homes elsewhere, it was decided to convert the house into two flats to provide an income sufficient to pay the rates on what was effectively three blocks of land. In 1966 the flats were reconverted to a single house and offered for sale, passing out of the Drew family in 1967. The large boatshed on Cabbage Tree Creek and the stables were demolished subsequently. In 1987–88 the house was raised slightly and the undercroft, which previously housed a bathroom, laundry, and two water tanks, was converted into a lounge/dining room area. The place remains a private residence.

== Description ==
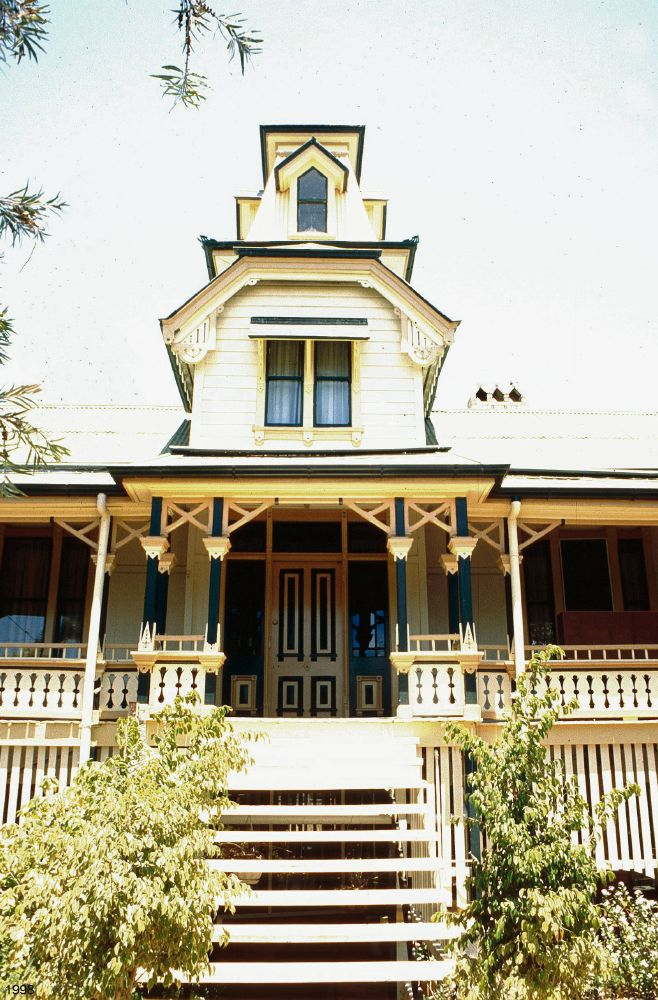
Entrance, 1998

The former Drew Residence at 20 Wharf Street, Shorncliffe, is a substantial, high-set, single-storeyed timber residence with enclosed brick undercroft, attic and viewing tower. It is located at the southern end of Shorncliffe, on a property of over 60 perches (1,500 m^{2}) which slopes to Cabbage Tree Creek, providing boat access.

The core of the house is rectangular in form, with gabled transverse wings at each end. There is a substantial brick chimney rising above the main roof, and the roofs of the side wings have galvanised iron ridge ventilators. Its most distinctive characteristic is a centrally-positioned Mansard tower over dormer rooms in the main roof, providing a central focus to the front elevation and a viewing room with vistas over Cabbage Tree Creek to Moreton Bay. Across the front of the main body of the building is a deep verandah.

The Wharf Street elevation is particularly decorative, with paired, chamfered verandah posts with timber capitals and brackets; a decorative timber balustrade across the front verandah; decorative timber bargeboards and gable infills; an attic room with large dormer window over the front entrance and vestibule; and the elaborate timber viewing tower above this, complete with decorative bargeboards, spandrels beneath the guttering and acroteria.

The rear elevation also has a central, decorative focus, where a dormer window and a room beneath this project from the core of the house, overlooking Cabbage Tree Creek. There are some later additions at the rear, and the undercroft has been enclosed with brick, which is screened from the front street by timber battens.

Most of the windows are tripartite sashes, and have window hoods. Those facing the street incorporate a small gable in the window hood.

The interior also has ornate decorative elements and fine joinery. These include a narrow staircase in the vestibule with turned timber balustrades and an ornate, carved newel post. The interior is lined throughout with wide tongue and groove boards. To dado height throughout most of the house the boards are diagonally placed, contrasting with the vertical boarding above. Architraves around all windows and doors have a carved quatrefoil detail to the corners, and doors throughout are timber panelled. The interior is painted throughout.

In plan, the building is largely symmetrical. The centrally-positioned front door with sidelights and fanlights opens into a wide vestibule, off which a large room opens either side. That on the western side is the lounge room, which has an early timber fireplace surround incorporating an over mantle and a cabinet. The eastern room was formerly a dining room, and has ornate, hand-crafted timber architraves.

Each of the side wings contains two rooms. Those in the western wing are separated by pairs of folding, panelled timber doors. Those in the eastern wing function as bedrooms and do not have connecting access. The side rooms which face Wharf Street are accessed both from the front verandah and from the large rooms which open off the vestibule. The two rooms which face the creek are accessed from rooms at the rear of the house.

Beyond the vestibule a door opens into a room at the rear of the house which overlooks Cabbage Tree Creek, and from which two small rooms open, one either side, entered via arches, one of which is an early arch. These are the rooms which give access to the rear rooms in the side wings. The back room on the western side also has access to an external set of stairs, but the stair to the room on the eastern side has been removed. Later bathroom extensions at the rear are accessed from these rooms also.

A narrow stair in the vestibule leads to two small attic bedrooms with arched doorways. From the front attic room another narrow stair leads to the tower viewing room.

The enclosed undercroft, which is accessed via a recent stair in the room behind the vestibule, contains a living space, dining area and kitchen. The chimney at this level has a double fireplace, which is of recent construction, but utilising the base of the original chimney. A recent galvanised iron awning extends from the rear of the undercroft.

The grounds have been altered, and the only evidence of the boatshed are two slipways, now covered by rapid mangrove re-growth. A recent timber jetty extends from the rear of the property into Cabbage Tree Creek, and later sheds replace the stables along the northwestern boundary of the property. A tennis court has been constructed in the southeast corner of the block along the creek frontage, and gardens have been built up in front of the house. Paved paths have been added and the driveway cemented. The front fence along Wharf Street has three ornate timber gates, one situated in front of the stairs leading to the front entrance, and the other two on the eastern side of the property which give vehicle access. These are 1947 replicas of the original timber gates.

== Heritage listing ==
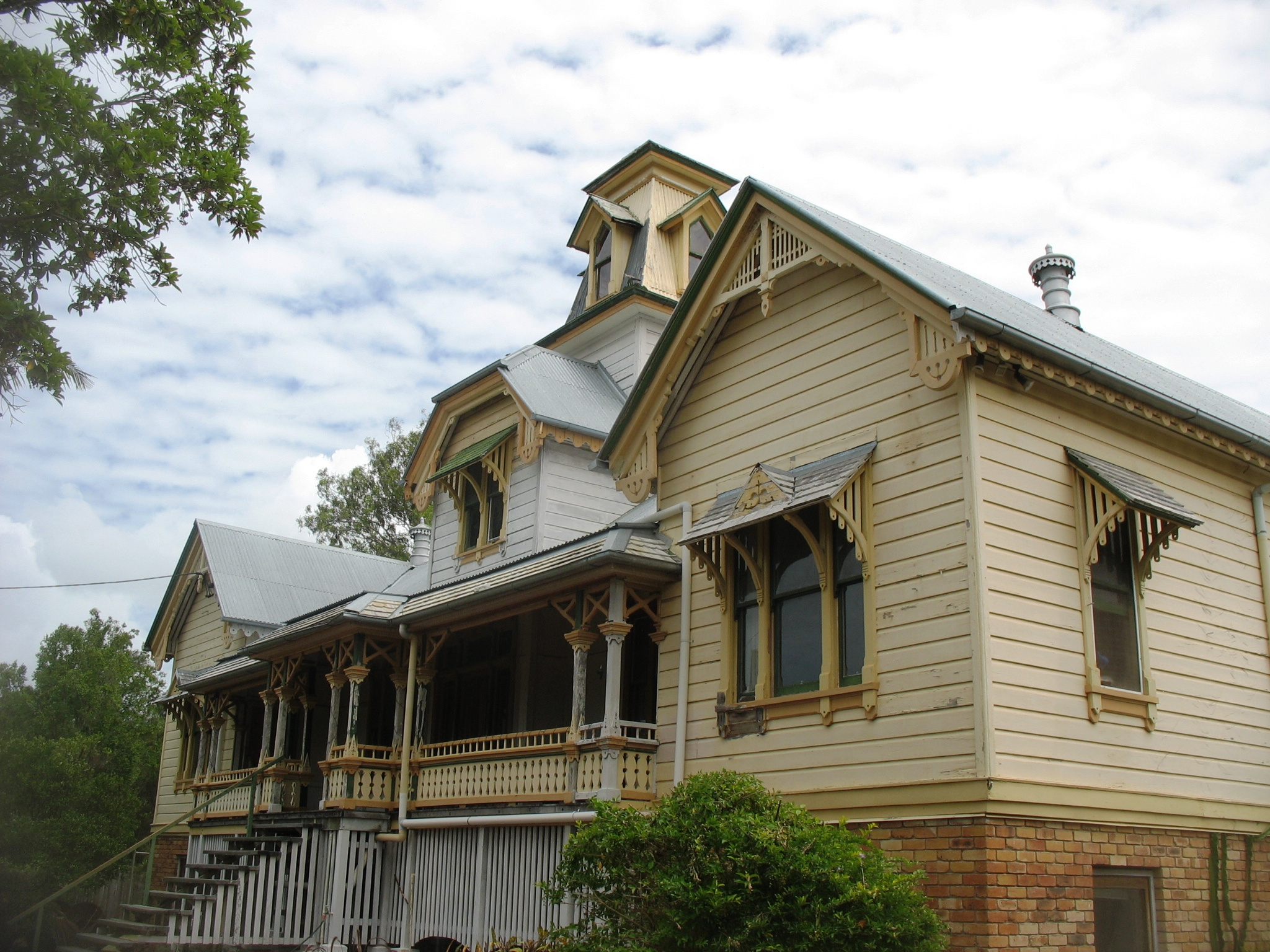
House in 2019

The former Drew Residence was listed on the Queensland Heritage Register on 24 November 2000 having satisfied the following criteria.

The place is important in demonstrating the evolution or pattern of Queensland's history.

Constructed in the 1890s by American carpenters and boatbuilders Samuel Drew and his sons as their family home, the place is important in illustrating the expansion of Sandgate as a town and seaside resort in the late 19th and early 20th centuries. The place is closely associated with the Drew family and their contribution to local pleasure-craft construction in the late 19th and early 20th centuries, further illustrating the nature of Sandgate as a bayside community.

The place is important in demonstrating the principal characteristics of a particular class of cultural places.

The former Drew Residence is important in demonstrating the principal characteristics of a substantial, late 19th century artisan's residence designed to impress, and of large timber sea-side homes in the Sandgate/Shorncliffe area in general, including in the design a tower room with views over Cabbage Tree Creek to Moreton Bay.

The place is important because of its aesthetic significance.

The place exhibits a range of aesthetic characteristics, including the setting of the house adjacent to Cabbage Tree Creek; the scale, form, and materials employed; the decorative external timberwork; and the quality of the interior detailing, particularly the well-crafted joinery. The place makes a significant contribution to the streetscape, and is a local landmark.
