= Drew Hutchison =

Drew Hutchison can refer to:

- Drew Hutchison (baseball) (born 1990), American MLB pitcher
- Drew Hutchison (rugby league) (born 1995), Australian rugby league player
