= Charles Drew =

Charles Drew may refer to:

- Charles R. Drew (1904–1950), American physician, surgeon, and medical researcher
- Charles Drew (cricketer) (1888–1960), Australian cricketer
- Charles Drew (surgeon) (1916–1987), cardiothoracic surgeon
- Charles S. Drew (1825–1886), representative in the legislature of the Oregon Territory of the United States
- USNS Charles Drew, a 2010 Lewis and Clark-class dry cargo ship of the United States Navy
- Charles John Drew (c. 1690–1740), English lawyer murdered in Suffolk by his namesake son
