= Richard Drew =

Richard Drew may refer to:

- Richard Gurley Drew (1899–1980), inventor
- Richard Drew (photographer) (born 1946), AP photographer
- Richard Maxwell Drew (1822–1850), attorney and politician in Louisiana
- R. Harmon Drew Sr. (1917–1995), judge in Louisiana
- Zacron (Richard Drew, 1943–2012), English artist best known for designing the Led Zeppelin III album cover

== See also ==
- Charles R. Drew (Charles Richard Drew, 1904–1950), American physician, surgeon, and medical researcher
