= Drew Parsons =

Drew Parsons may refer to:

- Drew Parsons (musician) (born 1974), bassist for the band American Hi-Fi
- Drew Parsons (cricketer) (born 1975), Scottish cricketer

== See also ==
- Andrew Parsons (disambiguation)
