= Asbjørn Drewes =

Asbjørn Mohr Drewes is a clinical professor at Aalborg University and a consultant at Aalborg University Hospital. He specialises in internal medicine, gastroenterology and hepatology.

Asbjørn Mohr Drewes defended his Ph.D. thesis at Aalborg University in 1998 and his doctoral thesis (D.M.Sc) at Aarhus University in 1999. He is currently the director of the research group Mech-Sense.

In the course of his career, Asbjørn Mohr Drewes has received awards from the Danish Society for Gastroenterology and Hepatology (DSGH) and the Danish Association of Rehabilitation Medicine. His research has been funded by a range of both Danish and international foundations such as Karen Elise Jensen's Foundation, The Obel Family Foundation, the Danish Agency for Science, Technology and Innovation and the EU 7th Framework Programme.
