= Andrew Guthrie Ferguson =

American legal scholar

Andrew Guthrie Ferguson is a professor of law at The George Washington University Law School.

He specializes in predictive policing, big data surveillance, and juries. Ferguson has written about the US Department of Justice's problematic funding of big data surveillance technologies.

Ferguson is also a Technology Fellow at the New York University School of Law's Policing Project.

== Education and career ==
Ferguson received his BA from Williams College in 1994 and his JD from the University of Pennsylvania School of Law. He has an LLM from Georgetown University Law Center.

Ferguson clerked for Carolyn Dineen King who is currently the Chief Judge of the United States Court of Appeals for the Fifth Circuit.

Ferguson was a supervising attorney for seven years at the Public Defender Service for the District of Columbia.

== Books ==
Ferguson's book The Rise of Big Data Policing: Surveillance, Race, and the Future of Law Enforcement looks at the role of surveillance technology and predictive analytics in modern policing.

His first book Why Jury Duty Matters: A Citizen’s Guide to Constitutional Action is meant for jurors on jury duty.
