= Ben Drew =

Ben Drew may refer to:

- Urban L. Drew (1924–2013), WWII fighter ace
- Plan B (musician) (born 1983), real name Benjamin Paul Ballance-Drew
