= Drew D. Perkins =

American entrepreneur

- Born: 1963 (age 62–63)
- Education: Carnegie Mellon University (1986)
- Known for: Founder of technology companies

Drew D. Perkins (born 1963) is a serial entrepreneur and is co-founder and CEO of Mojo Vision, a company developing Mojo Lens, the first true smart contact lens.

== Early life and education ==
Perkins was born in 1963. He received a Bachelor of Science degree in electrical engineering, computer engineering, and mathematics from Carnegie Mellon University in 1986.

While at Carnegie Mellon, Perkins made several important contributions to the early internet:

- Created the popular CMU PC/IP software package for MS-DOS PCs
- Lead author of the Point-to-Point Protocol (PPP) and contributor to the standard for IP over IEEE 802 networks (e.g. Ethernet) and BOOTP (predecessor of DHCP)
- Began his first "company" and designed what may have been the world’s first Ethernet switch

== Career ==
=== Entrepreneurial experience ===
Companies founded or materially developed by Perkins include:

- Mojo Vision, a company developing Mojo Lens, the first true smart contact lens.
- Gainspeed, which was sold to Nokia in 2016. Founded in 2012, Gainspeed raised $55 million in financing from investors including New Enterprise Associates, Andreessen Horowitz, Shasta Ventures, Technicolor, and Juniper Networks.
- Infinera, a public company which was co-founded by Perkins in 2001.
- OnFiber Communications, which was sold to Qwest Communications for $107 million in cash in 2006. Other owners of OnFiber Communications included Bear Stearns Merchant Banking (11%) and Kleiner Perkins Caufield & Byers (30%).
- Lightera Networks, co-founded by Perkins in 1998 and acquired by Ciena in 1999 in exchange for 20.6 million shares in Ciena.
- FORE Systems, where Perkins was principal architect from 1993 to 1997. The company was sold in 1999 for $4.5 billion.
- Interstream, where Perkins developed advanced network file server products.

=== Writings ===
- Perkins is one of the lead authors of the Point-to-Point Protocol (PPP), an early internet technology that provided access to the internet via the circuit-switched telephone system.

=== Awards and recognition ===
- Perkins (E 1985) received the Alumni Achievement (Merit) Award from the CMU Alumni Association in 2005.

=== Philanthropy ===
- Perkins has endowed the Drew D. Perkins Professorship in Advanced Networking and Communications at Carnegie-Mellon University.

=== Investments ===
Perkins participated in a $5 million seed financing for RevUp Software in March 2016.

Perkins participated in a $26 million Series B financing for Console Inc. in November 2015.
