= Drew Uyi =

British football agent

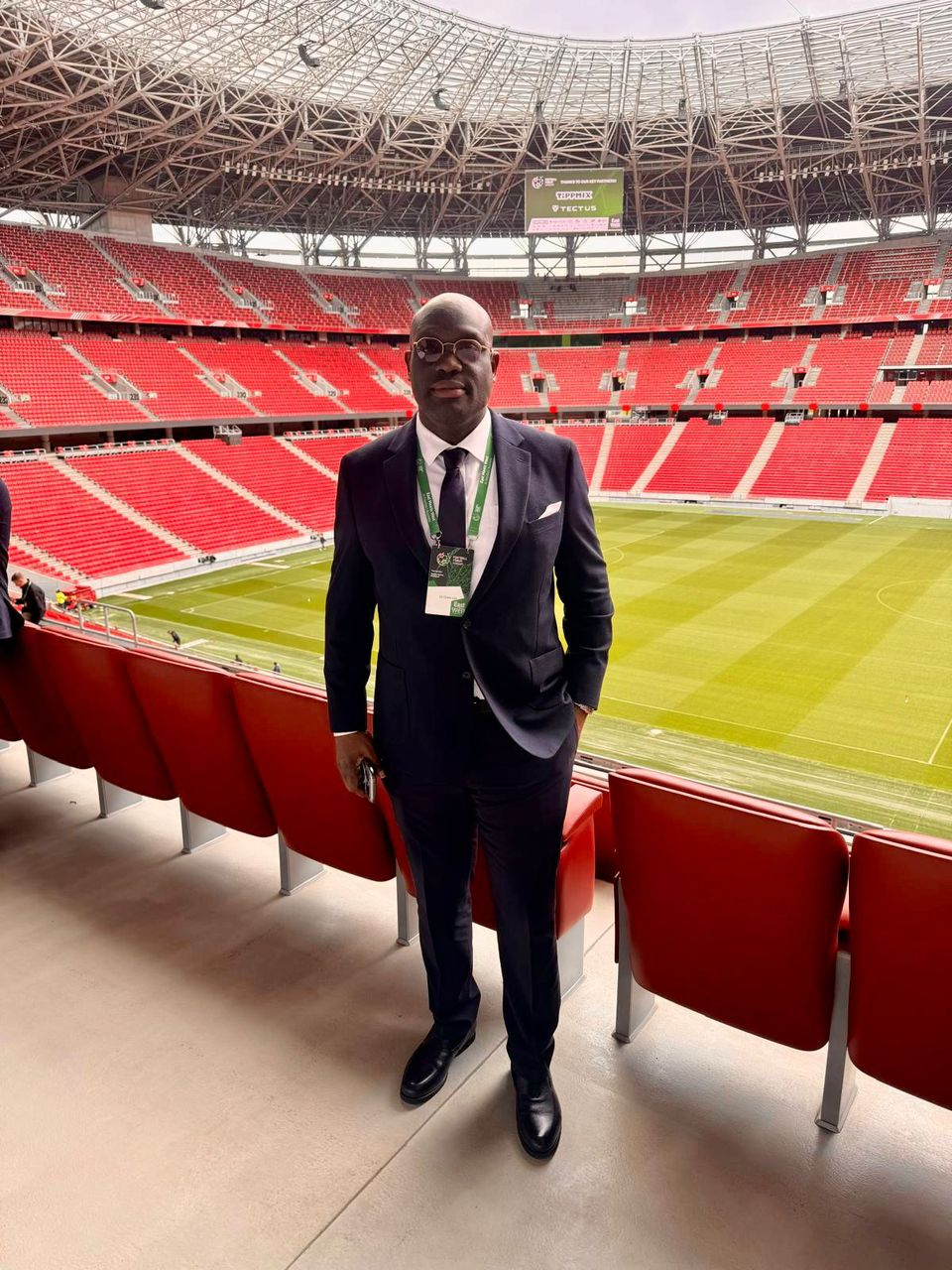
- Drew Uyi at Football Forum Hungary 2026.
- Born: Andrew Uyioghosa Ogbomoide; November 30, 1976 (age 49); Birmingham, United Kingdom
- Other name: Andrew Uyioghosa Ogbomoide
- Education: London Metropolitan University, University of the Arts London
- Occupations: Football agent, brand strategist and entrepreneur
- Years active: 2018–present
- Website: www.drewuyi.com

Andrew Uyioghosa Ogbomoide, also known as Drew Uyi, is a British football agent, brand strategist and entrepreneur. He is a registered intermediary with the Football Association in the United Kingdom and a currently accredited FIFA players' agent.

== Education and career ==
Uyi attended his primary and junior high school education in Benin City, Nigeria before moving abroad for his secondary education in Switzerland and Germany. He went to the London Metropolitan University where he studied and obtained a Degree in Sports and Events Management, and later gained admission to the University of the Arts London where he obtained a Certificate in Marketing and Advertising. In 2022, he was conferred a Doctor of Philosophy in Christian Leadership from Cornerstone Christian University, Atlanta, United States.

== Career ==
Uyi has been a registered agent with the Football Association (FA) since 2018 and a licensed FIFA players' agent since October 2023. He has worked with Emmanuel Dennis, Ahmed Musa, Wilfred Ndidi, Odion Ighalo, Shehu Abdullahi, Olarenwaju Kayode, and Moses Ebiye. Uyi was involved in the brokered Olarenwaju Kayode's loan move from Shakhtar Donetsk to Turkish club Gaziantep.

In 2022, Uyi negotiated and brokered the sale of Emmanuel Dennis from Watford F.C. to Nottingham Forest in the Premier League for around for £20 million after negoitatation with West Ham United and several premier league clubs, including Everton and Southampton, collapsed due to the price tag.

The Moses Ebiye transfer to Motherwell from Aalesund in March 2024 was brokered by Uyi.

== Outside football ==
=== Personal honours ===
Uyi was appointed Youth Ambassador of Edo State in 2023 by Governor Godwin Obaseki for Positive Influence and Exemplary Achievements in Sports. He was nominated for GAB Awards UK 2018.
