= Drew Brown =

Drew Brown may refer to:

- Drew Bundini Brown (1928–1987), American boxing trainer of Muhammad Ali, and occasional film actor
- Drew Brown (musician) (born 1984), American musician, member of OneRepublic
- Drew Brown (Canadian football) (born 1995), Canadian gridiron football kicker

== See also ==
- Dru Brown (born 1997), American professional football quarterback
- Andrew Brown (disambiguation)
