= Eric Drew =

Eric Drew is one of the first adults in the US to survive a double cord blood stem cells transplant for "terminal leukemia". Drew is noted for having his identity stolen during his treatment. While undergoing treatment for a rare and virulent leukemia, his identity was stolen by a medical worker called Richard Gibson. Drew fought and became the first person to force a federal criminal conviction under the Health Information Privacy (HIPAA) laws. Gibson was sentenced to 16 months in prison and had to pay $15,000 in restitution. Drew has now dedicated his life to helping patients with all types of serious and terminal diseases, and has become a spokesperson for the non-controversial cord blood stem cells that saved his life.

Drew founded in 2003 the Eric Drew Foundation, a non-profit organization that promotes advocacy for terminally ill patients.

Dateline NBC presented a segment called "Fighting cancer... and an ID thief " on Eric Drew's story on December 25, 2005.

== See also ==
- Health Insurance Portability and Accountability Act
- Identity Theft
