= Drew Daniel =

Drew Daniel may refer to:

- Drew Daniel, the winning contestant of the fifth American season of television show Big Brother
- Drew Daniel, a member of the American experimental electronic music duo Matmos
