= Drews =

Drews is a surname. Notable people with the surname include:

- Arthur Drews (1863-1935), German writer, historian and philosopher
- Annie Drews (born 1993), American volleyball player
- Berta Drews (1901-1987), German film actress
- Bill Drews (1870-1938), German lawyer and Prussian Minister of the Interior
- Carl Drews (1894–1983), German cinematographer
- Dani Drews (born 1999), American volleyball player
- Egon Drews (1926–2011), West German flatwater canoer
- Frank Drews (1916-1972), American baseball player
- Günter Drews (born 1967), German footballer
- Jürgen Drews (born 1945), German Schlager singer, musician, songwriter, actor and restaurateur
- Karl Drews (1920–1963), American baseball player
- Lofty Drews (born 1940), Kenyan rally driver
- Paul Drews (1858-1912), German Lutheran theologian
- Robert Drews (born 1936), American historian
- Stefan Drews (born 1979), German decathlete
- Stipe Drews (born Stipe Drviš in 1973), Croatian boxer

== See also ==
- Drews Gap, Oregon, United States
- Drew (name)
