= Frank Drew =

United States Air Force general (1930–2021)

Frank M. Drew
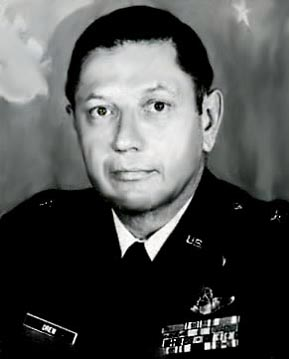
- Born: October 10, 1930; Salt Lake City, Utah
- Died: November 13, 2021 (aged 91); Waco, Texas
- Burial place: Arlington National Cemetery
- Military career
- Allegiance: United States of America
- Branch: United States Air Force
- Rank: Brigadier general

Frank Morehead Drew (October 10, 1930 – November 13, 2021) was an American brigadier general. He retired on July 1, 1979.

== Biography ==
General Drew was born in Salt Lake City, Utah. He graduated from Beverly Hills High School, California, in 1948. After attending Western Kentucky State College for a year, he entered the United States Military Academy, West Point, New York, and graduated in June 1953 with a Bachelor of Science degree and a commission in the U.S. Air Force. He completed the U.S. Army Command and Staff College in 1964 and the National War College in 1971, and received his Master of Science degree from The George Washington University, Washington, D.C., in 1971.

After graduation from the academy, he attended pilot training and received his pilot wings at Williams Air Force Base, Arizona, in 1954. He then attended F-86 combat crew training at Nellis Air Force Base, Nevada, and while at Nellis was selected for assignment in January 1955 to the U.S. Air Force Academy, where he served as an air training officer for the next three years.

In December 1957 he was assigned as a flight commander in the 417th Fighter-Bomber Squadron of the 50th Fighter-Bomber Wing at Toul-Rosières Air Base, France, flying the F-86H and the F-100D. In January 1959 he was transferred to Incirlik Air Base, Turkey, to organize an operations facility for command and control of Tactical Air Command fighter squadrons on rotational temporary duty from the United States.

General Drew was transferred to Luke Air Force Base, Arizona, in February 1960, where he served as an operations officer in training squadrons and in the group headquarters. In August 1963 he entered the Army Command and General Staff College at Fort Leavenworth, Kansas.

After graduation in July 1964, he was assigned to the 1st Air Commando Wing, Hurlburt Field, Florida, where he held various squadron and wing positions. He also performed six months of temporary duty with a T-28 detachment in Southeast Asia. He was wing director of standardization and evaluation when, in April 1967, he was assigned to command the Tropic Moon I Task Force, a special Air Warfare Center unit equipped with A-lE's fitted with night vision devices designed for independent night interdiction operations. After more than a year of development, testing and training in the continental United States, General Drew went with the unit to Southeast Asia, where he commanded it during a year of combat operations.

General Drew returned to the United States in December 1968 and was assigned as chief of the Air Support Branch in Defense Communications Planning Group, Washington, D.C. In January 1970 he was assigned to Headquarters U.S. Air Force where he served in the Office of the Special Assistant for Sensor Exploitation, Office of the Vice Chief of Staff, U.S. Air Force.

In August 1970 General Drew entered the National War College, Washington, D.C. He returned to Headquarters U.S. Air Force in July 1971 to serve as assistant for general officer matters in the Office of the Deputy Chief of Staff, Personnel. In August 1974 he was assigned as commandant, Air Command and Staff College, at Air University, Maxwell Air Force Base, Alabama.

General Drew served as chief, Air Force Section, U.S. Delegation, Joint Brazil-United States Military Commission, at Rio de Janeiro, Brazil, from August 1975 to December 1976, when he assumed his duty at the Tactical Fighter Weapons Center.

He was a command pilot with 3,600 flying hours. His military decorations and awards include the Legion of Merit, Distinguished Flying Cross, Meritorious Service Medal, Air Medal with four oak leaf clusters, Air Force Commendation Medal, Presidential Unit Citation, and the Air Force Outstanding Unit Award with oak leaf cluster.

He was promoted to the grade of brigadier general August 1, 1974, with same date of rank.
