= Bill Drew =

Australian rules footballer

Personal information
- Full name: William Russell Drew
- Born: 7 February 1890; Richmond, Victoria
- Died: 30 July 1955 (aged 65); Warragul, Victoria

Playing career^{1}
Years	Club	Games (Goals)
1910	Fitzroy	8 (4)
- ^{1} Playing statistics correct to the end of 1910.

William Russell Drew (7 February 1890 – 30 July 1955) was an Australian rules footballer who played with Fitzroy in the Victorian Football League (VFL).
