= Drue Cressener =

Drue Cressener (c. 1642 – 1718) was an English clergyman and theological writer, known as an interpreter of the Apocalypse.

== Life ==
He was a native of Bury St. Edmunds, Suffolk. He was educated at Christ's College, Cambridge where he matriculated as a sizar in 1658 aged 16; and at Pembroke College, Cambridge to which he migrated in 1661. He graduated B.A. 1661, M.A. 1685, B.D. 1703, D.D. 1708. He was elected a fellow of Pembroke on 29 August 1662.

He became treasurer of Framlingham, Suffolk, and vicar of Waresley, Huntingdonshire in 1677, and junior proctor of the University of Cambridge in 1678. On 14 January 1678 he was presented to the vicarage of Soham, Cambridgeshire, and on 12 December 1700 he was collated to a prebend in Ely Cathedral. He died at Soham on 20 February 1718.

== Works ==
His works are:

- 'The Judgements of God upon the Roman Catholick Church; in a prospect of several approaching revolutions, in explication of the Trumpets and Vials in the Apocalypse, upon principles generally acknowledged by Protestant interpreters,' London, 1689.
- 'A Demonstration of the first Principles of Protestant applications of the Apocalypse. Together with the consent of the Ancients concerning the fourth beast of the 7th of Daniel, and the beast in the Revelations,' London, 1690.
