= Drew Hyland =

American academic

Drew Hyland (born February 9, 1939) is the Charles A. Dana Professor of Philosophy at Trinity College in Hartford, Connecticut.

He has published 6 books and over 40 journal articles. He holds degrees from Princeton University and Pennsylvania State University, where Stanley Rosen was his thesis advisor.

== Selected bibliography ==
- The Origins of Philosophy: Its Rise in Myth and the PreSocratics (1973).
- The Virtue of Philosophy: An Interpretation of Plato's Charmides (1981).
- The Question of Play (1984).
- Philosophy and Sport (1990).
- Finitude and Transcendence in the Platonic Dialogues (1995).
- Questioning Platonism : Continental Interpretations of Plato (2004).
- Plato and the Question of Beauty (2008).
