= Drew Levin =

Film industry businessperson

Drew Levin is the chairman and chief executive of TMC Entertainment. Levin has worked as a film and television producer, executive producer, and writer. As executive producer, he has been a part of over 3,000 hours of reality-based, documentary, and dramatic television series and specials.

== Career ==
Levin founded and led Team Communications, until being forced out.

Levin has worked on productions with PBS, Discovery Networks, MTV, TLC, CBS, BBC, Fox Family Channel and ABC.

In 2008, Levin was convicted of stock fraud, where he illegally conspired to inflate the revenue of Team Communications, and sentenced to 66 months in prison. A federal judge also ordered him to pay $2.3 million in restitution for these crimes.

In a separate case, Levin pled guilty to wire fraud.

== Notable shows and movies ==
=== As producer or executive producer ===
- Walking the Bible: A Journey By Land Through the Five Books of Moses (movie)
- Call of the Wild (TV series)
- Destination: Style (TV series)
- Earthquake in New York (TV movie)
- Future Quest (TV series)
- Hollywood FX Masters (TV series)
- Hollywood Stuntmakers (TV series)
- Top of the Pops (TV series)
- Total Recall 2070 (TV series)
- Route to Christianity (2007) (TV miniseries)
- International British Record Industry Awards (TV special)
- Strange Universe: Aliens Are Proof (movie)

=== As writer ===
- Living With Fran (TV show)
- Rock Me Baby (TV show)
- Home Improvement (TV show)
