= Gladstone Harbour, Queensland =

Gladstone Harbour
- Suburb
- Interactive map of Gladstone Harbour
- Coordinates: 23.8002°S 151.285°E
- Country: Australia
- State: Queensland
- LGA: Gladstone Region

Government
  - State electorate: Gladstone
  - Federal division: Flynn

Area
  - Total: 163.2 km^{2} (63.0 sq mi)

Population
  - Total: 24 (2021 census)
  - Density: 0.1471/km^{2} (0.381/sq mi)
- Postcode: 4680
Suburbs around Gladstone Harbour
Callemondah	Curtis Island	Coral Sea
Gladstone Central; Barney Point	Gladstone Harbour	Coral Sea
South Trees	Coral Sea	Coral Sea

Gladstone Harbour is an offshore locality in the Gladstone Region, Queensland, Australia. There are three small towns in Gladstone Harbour, all on Facing Island: Northcliffe, Farmers Point and Gatcombe. In the 2021 census, Gladstone Harbour had a population of 24 people.

== Geography ==
Although predominantly water, the locality includes Facing Island and Quoin Island (both of which are partially developed) and a small undeveloped part of southern Curtis Island which may be a separate unnamed island at high tide.

Facing Island (23°48′35″S 151°21′29″E) is 14.2 kilometres (8.8 mi) long and protects the harbour from the Coral Sea. There are two passages from the harbour to the sea. The North Channel (23.76457°S 151.32309°E) exits the harbour between the south of Curtis Island and the north of Facing Island, while the Gatcombe Channel (23.88847°S 151.36469°E) exits the harbour to the south of Facing Island and Boyne Island.

There are three small towns on Facing Island:

- Northcliffe at the northern tip of the island (23°45′41″S 151°20′07″E)
- Farmers Point at the north-west of the island (23°46′33″S 151°19′35″E)
- Gatcombe at Gatcombe Head at the southern tip of the island (23°52′42″S 151°22′28″E)

None of the towns are fully developed with typically half the blocks being undeveloped. Nonetheless the number of houses on the island is still high relative to the population, suggesting many houses are not permanently occupied but are "weekenders" or holiday homes.

Quoin Island is in the middle of Gladstone Harbour is approx 1.8 kilometres (1.1 mi) in length. It is thought the island was so named because its shape resembled a quoin used in conjunction with cannons. While there is no town on Quoin Island (23°48′21″S 151°17′11″E), it is partially developed with residential lots in the north of the island and a resort and turtle rehabilitation centre in the south of the island. Quoin Island Turtle Rehabilitation Centre is a non-governmental organisation that opened in March 2012 when the Fitzroy River flooded and turtles washed up on the beaches sick injured or dead.

== History ==
Facing Island was named on 6 August 1802 by Matthew Flinders on his voyage on HMS Investigator (1801) to map the coastline of New Holland (as the continent of Australia was then called). He also named Gatcombe Head, the southern tip of Facing Island (23°52′51″S 151°22′27″E), after Gatcombe House after the Hampshire residence of Vice Admiral Sir Roger Curtis, who had assisted Flinders with dockyard repairs to the Investigator in October 1801. Gatcombe Channel takes its name from Gatcombe Head.

The locality takes its name from the harbour which named in 1847, when the Port Curtis settlement was called Gladstone after the British Secretary of State for the Colonies, William Ewart Gladstone. Gladstone was later Prime Minister of the United Kingdom in 1868–1874, 1880, 1886 and 1892.

The town of Northcliffe first appears on an 1912 survey plan N6211.

The first Brisbane to Gladstone yacht race took place at Easter 1949.

The town of Farmers Point was named on 1 December 1961, but the name of the point itself first appeared on a 1901 survey plan N6211.

The Gladstone Harbour Festival commenced in 1963 attracting an estimated 5000 people.

The town of Gatcombe was named on 1 November 1967, taking its name from Gatcombe Point.

The Quoin Island Turtle Rehabilitation Centre opened in March 2012; it has holding tanks, swimming pools and treatment rooms to support the recovery and rehabilitation of up to 10 injured native turtles. The centre mostly cares for green turtles but has also cared for hawksbill turtles, flatback turtles and loggerhead turtles.

== Demographics ==
In the 2016 census, Gladstone Harbour had a population of 29 people.

In the 2021 census, Gladstone Harbour had a population of 24 people.

== Events ==
The Brisbane to Gladstone yacht race takes place annually at Easter with the yachts leaving Brisbane from the Shorncliffe pier in Moreton Bay on Good Friday arriving one to two days later (depending on ocean and weather conditions) in Gladstone Harbour, just off Auckland Creek. The arrival of the yachts and the presentation of trophies to the winners occurs as part of the Gladstone Harbour Festival. The finish is hosted by the Port Curtis Sailing Club.

== Transport ==
As the Port of Gladstone is a major commodity export facility, many ships transit the Gladstone Harbour every year. However, the port facilities are not within the locality of Gladstone Harbour as the locality boundaries are established off-shore so that the port facilities are within the land-based suburbs of Gladstone.

As at April 2019, a vehicular and passenger ferry runs services from Gladstone to Farmers Point on Facing Island and then to Southend on Curtis Island on five days of the week.

== Education ==
There are no schools on any of the islands in Gladstone Harbour, but there are numerous schools on the mainland if transport to the mainland is available. The alternatives are distance education and boarding school.
