= Port of Gladstone =

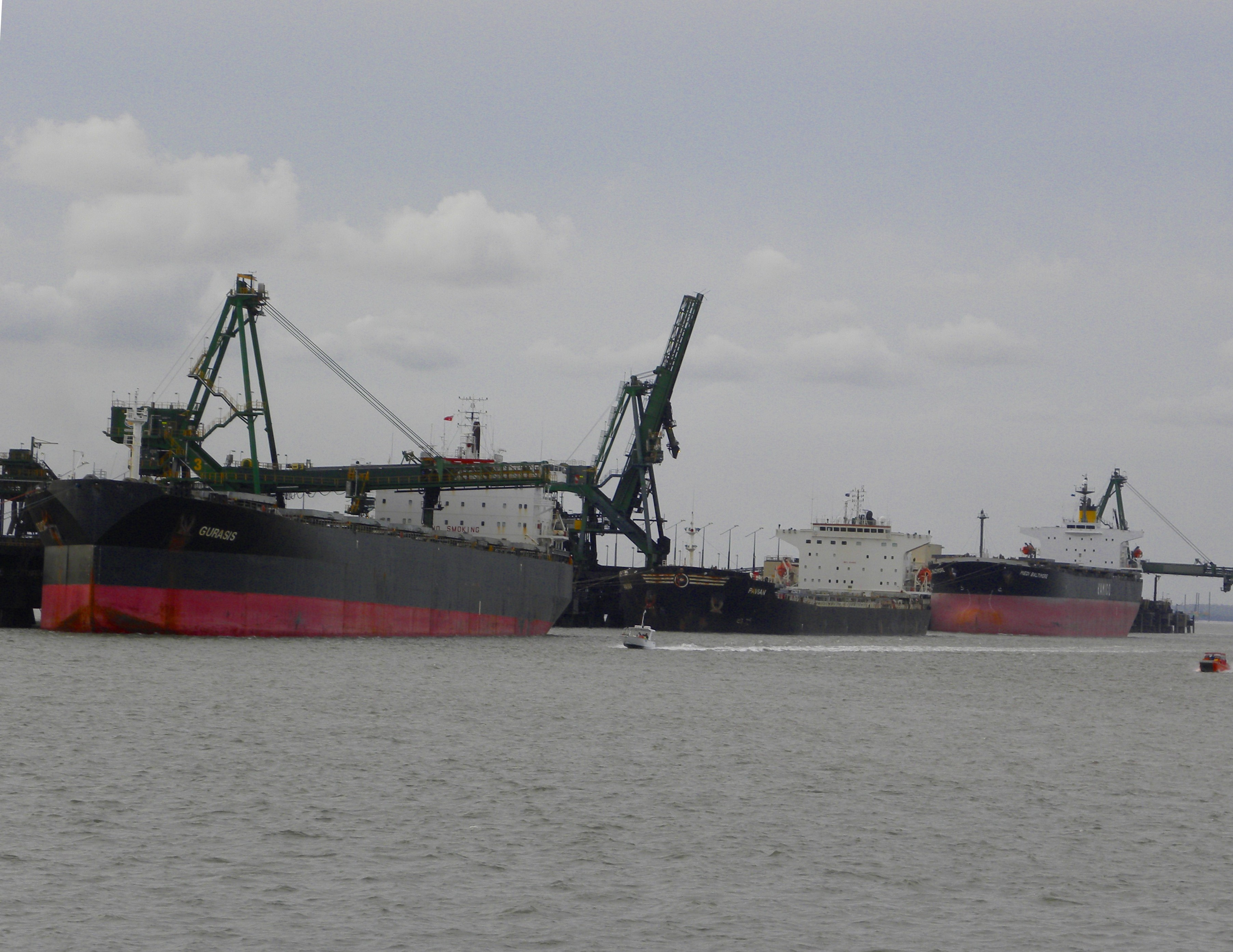
- Cargo ships in Gladstone Harbour, 2010
- Interactive map of Port of Gladstone
- Location within Australia

Location
- Country: Australia
- Location: Gladstone
- Coordinates: 23°49′12.70″S 151°14′33.08″E
- UN/LOCODE: AUGLT

Details
- Opened: 1914
- Owned by: Gladstone Ports Corporation
- Type of Harbor: Natural
- No. of berths: 24
- Draft depth: 18.8 m.

Statistics
- Annual cargo tonnage: 76,400,000 tonnes (2010–11)
- Website www.gpcl.com.au

The Port of Gladstone is Queensland's largest multi-commodity port and the fifth largest multi-commodity port in Australia. It is the world's fourth largest coal exporting terminal. It is within the locality of Callemondah in Gladstone in Central Queensland and is located about 525 kilometres (326 mi) north of Brisbane at Latitude of 23°49.61'S, Longitude 151°34.6’E. It is owned and managed by Gladstone Ports Corporation, which is a statutory corporate body of the Government of Queensland.

Major exports include coal, alumina, aluminium, cement products and liquid ammonia. Coal makes up 70% of the total exports from the port. Each year 50 million tonnes of coal passes through the port. Major imports include bauxite and petroleum products as well as general cargo in containers.

In 2008, the Queensland Government announced A$20.9 million worth of funding for the port which included A$4.3 million for dust suppression measures.

In late 2010 and early 2011 the port was closed in the aftermath of the 2010–2011 Queensland floods. The closure of the Blackwater railway system halted deliveries of coal from the Bowen Basin.

== Facilities ==
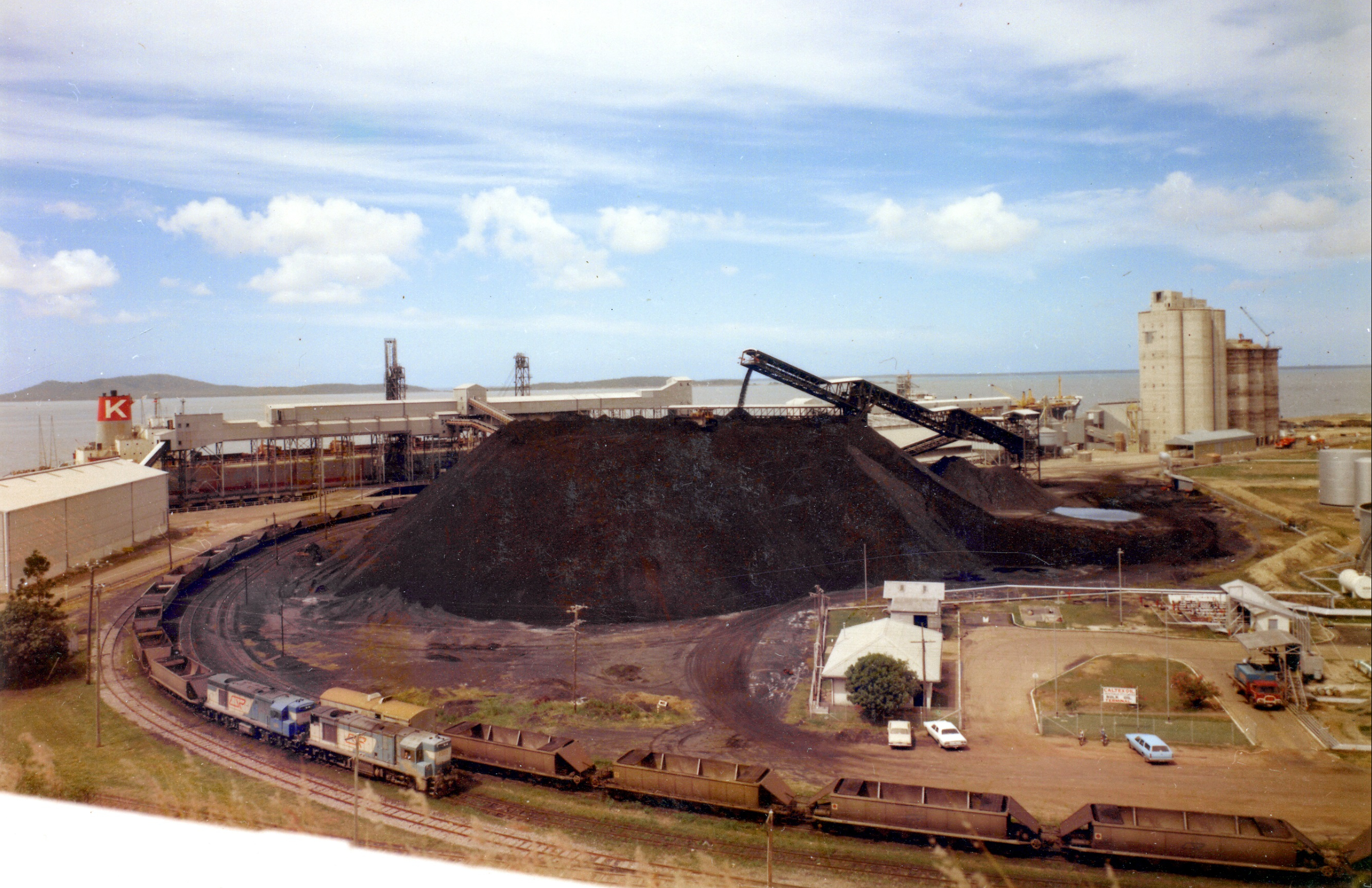
Coal pile at the Port of Gladstone, November 1974

The port consists of a number of wharves and terminal facilities. Auckland Point was where coal exporting began in 1925 and later live horse exports occurred in the mid-1930s. Barney Point was used to export coal from Moura. The facilities here were incorporated into the Port of Gladstone in November 1998.

The first berth at Fisherman's Landing was completed in 1980. A second berth was built in the 1990s and this area is earmarked for future expansion. Boyne Wharf is used by the Boyne Island aluminium smelter and was opened in August 1982. Two berths at South Trees have been used by Queensland Alumina Limited.

RG Tanna Coal Terminal, currently the largest by volume was opened in 1997 and is used primarily for the export of coking coal and other metallurgical coal to Japanese, Korean, Indian and Chinese steel mills. RG Tanna Coal Terminal receives coal from 17 mines within the southern Bowen Basin via two rail supply chains (Blackwater and Moura). The terminal consists of three bottom dump rail receival stations, 22 stockpiles, 4 berths and 3 shiploaders.

All shipping to and from the port is through Gladstone Harbour which has two channels to the Coral Sea; the northerly one is between Curtis Island and Facing Island and the southerly one is between Facing Island and Boyne Island.

== Expansion ==
The western part of the harbour basin is currently being expanded, primarily to allow increased exports of liquified natural gas (LNG). Expansion plans in the port include the development of LNG exports, expansion of existing coal terminals and alumina refinery as well as a possible nickel refinery. Santos has a LNG plant on Curtis Island. Exports from the Santos plant are expected to begin in 2015.

At least 25 million cubic metres of sediment is expected to be dredged. Dredging began in June 2011 and is expected to be completed in 2014. The Port of Gladstone has permission to dredge 32 million tonnes. Two water quality monitoring sites in the basin have repeatedly recorded levels of turbidity above acceptable levels. High turbidity levels pose a threat to seagrass beds in the area.

In August 2011, a Fisheries Queensland spokesman said they received reports of fish with milky eyes. A spokesman from the Gladstone Fish Markets claimed that diseased fish were still being caught in large numbers in November 2011.

In June 2012, the UNESCO World Heritage Committee requested that an independent review into the management of the port be undertaken. The review found that the port was being properly managed and that the sediment contained acceptable levels of contaminants. The four-person expert panel blamed severe weather for recent fish deaths.

== See also ==
- Economy of Queensland
- List of ports in Australia
