= Gladstone Harbour Festival =

The Gladstone Harbour Festival is an annual event held every Easter in Gladstone, Queensland, Australia. Beginning on the Wednesday preceding the Easter weekend, the five-day festival is centred around the GPC Marina Parklands and consists of an array of novelty events and entertainment, including talent quests, live music, the Great Raft Regatta, a street parade, children's entertainment and fireworks displays. Ambassadors of the Gladstone Harbour Festival are also crowned at the event.

== Background ==
The Gladstone Harbour Festival was first held in 1963 attracting an estimated 5000 people. It is believed an estimated 70,000 people in 2011 attended the festival.

The Brisbane to Gladstone yacht race predates the festival by 14 years, having begun in 1949. One of the biggest attractions at the festival is watching the finish of this yacht race, which commences in Moreton Bay on Good Friday and concludes in Gladstone Harbour with the trophy presentations to the winners on the afternoon of Easter Sunday.

There were concerns about the festival's financial viability in 2005. The festival attracted some controversy in 2006 and 2009 after stallholders at the event were observed selling Nazi flags.
