= Musgrave House =

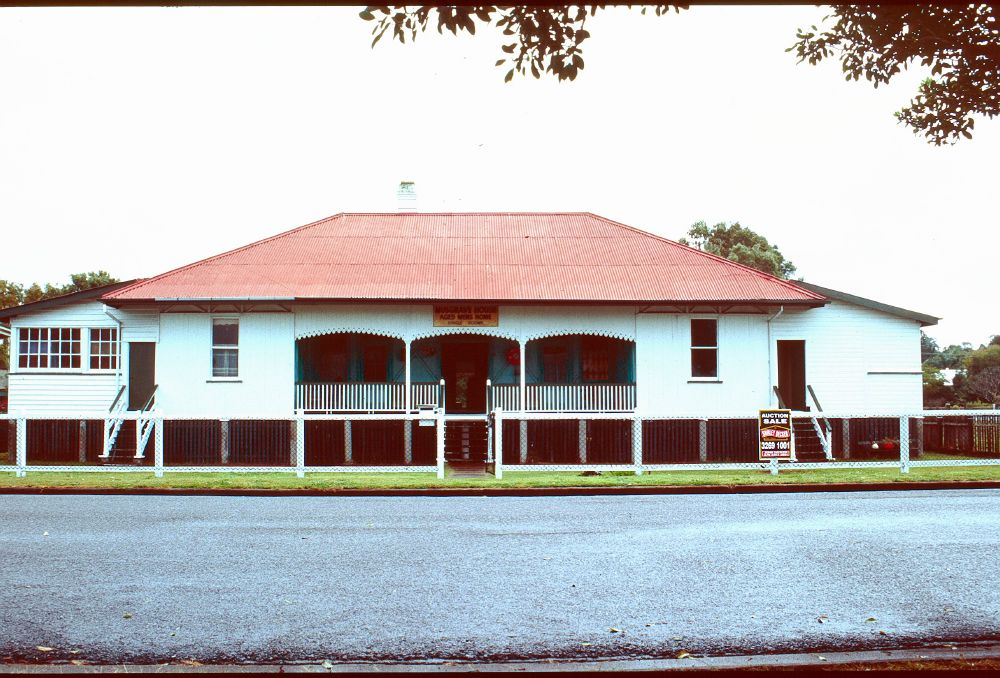
- Musgrave House, 1999

- Location within Queensland Location within Australia
- 27.3299°S 153.083°E
- Location: 8 Allpass Parade, Shorncliffe, City of Brisbane, Queensland, Australia

History
- Design period: 1870s–1890s (late 19th century)
- Built: 1884–1920s

Site notes
- Architect: Richard Gailey

Queensland Heritage Register
- Official name: Musgrave House, Lady Musgrave Sanitorium for Sick Children
- Type: state heritage (built)
- Designated: 22 October 1999
- Reference no.: 601499
- Significant period: 1880s–1920s (fabric); 1880s–1931 (historical)
- Significant components: kitchen/kitchen house, toilet block/earth closet/water closet, shed/s, ward – enclosed

Musgrave House is a heritage-listed sanatorium at 8 Allpass Parade, Shorncliffe, City of Brisbane, Queensland, Australia. It was designed by Richard Gailey and built from 1884 to 1920s. It is also known as Lady Musgrave Sanitorium for Sick Children. It was added to the Queensland Heritage Register on 22 October 1999.

== History ==
Located on a spacious corner block facing Cabbage Tree Creek, Musgrave House is a low set timber building with a high pitched, hipped roof designed by renowned Brisbane architect Richard Gailey. Built in 1884 as a convalescent home for children from the Hospital for Sick Children, Musgrave House dates from the time when Sandgate and Shorncliffe were crowded with boarding houses and convalescent homes. Since 1939, Musgrave House has continuously operated as a boarding house for men.

In its inception, the Lady Musgrave Sanatorium for Sick Children reflects prominent nineteenth-century ideas about health and childhood. Providing health facilities was not a main concern for the colonial government of Queensland, caring for the sick was considered a task for voluntary groups and charitable organisations. The idea of hospitals specifically for children was itself a new idea and had evolved steadily throughout the nineteenth century. Children's hospitals were increasingly established throughout the world in the latter half of the century. The vivid impressions left by a visit to children accommodated in adult wards in Brisbane led Mary McConnel of Cressbrook Station to launch the idea of a children's hospital for the colony. Indeed, at this time children under five years of age were denied treatment at the General Hospital. Thus, the Hospital for Sick Children in Brisbane was founded in 1878 and was the second in Australia.

Statistics from the 1860s and 70s show how perilous life was for the children of colonial Queensland. In 1866, the Queensland Registrar-General announced that the infant mortality rate was "out of all proportion great", 49.25% of all deaths in 1863 were of children under the age of five. Half the children born in 1877 died before reaching the age of five. Dysentery, diarrhoea and typhoid were rife, along with many other illnesses unknown to medical practitioners of the time. At the same time, there was growing recognition of childhood as a distinct stage of life and less acceptance of the moralistic view that providing facilities for children encouraged mothers to abdicate their maternal responsibilities.

Such was the prevailing attitude towards children when Lady Lucinda Musgrave became the first patroness of the Hospital for Sick Children. Lady Musgrave was an enthusiastic patroness, attending monthly Hospital Committee meetings and "doing much by her loving example to interest others". The idea of a sanatorium was proposed in 1883 and she took up the scheme with energy, personally securing the land at Shorncliffe which was given in trust by the government. The choice of the Shorncliffe site for the sanatorium was in keeping with prevailing ideas about health. The widespread acceptance of the miasmic theory of disease meant that fresh air and well ventilated, well lit buildings were considered essential for recuperation and recovery from illness. Bayside suburbs which offered sea bathing and outdoor enjoyment in addition to fresh air, were considered ideal for therapeutic purposes.

The building was completed in 1884 at a cost of £400. The architect was Richard Gailey, the official architect for the Hospital for Sick Children. Gailey designed the original Children's hospital at Bowen Bridge in 1883, charging only half of his commission to support the establishment of the hospital. He went on to design the fever ward in 1884, the morgue in 1885, the Resident Surgeon's quarters in 1889 and the nurse's quarters in 1891. Other buildings in Sandgate designed by Gailey were the original Sandgate Municipal Chambers and Town Hall in Kate St in 1882 (destroyed by fire May 1910) and the second Sandgate Baptist Church on Flinders Parade in 1887.

It is clear that Gailey had accepted current thinking about hospital design and had adopted the pavilion plan in his design for the main block of the Hospital for Sick Children. Elements of the pavilion plan as it was adapted for the Queensland context are plainly evident in the design of the Lady Musgrave Sanatorium. With its centrally located entrance hall and wards to either side shaded by a deep verandah, the planning of the sanatorium has strong similarities to timber hospitals constructed throughout Queensland, albeit on a smaller scale. Kitchen and other service areas are located in a separate wing at the back of the building, enabling the wards to be ventilated with windows along two sides.

Although the building was completed in 1884 and the permanent reserve announced in 1885, it did not formally open until 1888. Committee meeting minutes indicate that the sanatorium was in operation by 1887 and that it was the committee's unwillingness to enter into debt that caused the delay in opening. The three years 1884–1887 were spent fund raising and organising equipment and furniture for the sanatorium. Lady Musgrave furnished one ward herself and several other ladies "gave most timely gifts of the same kind", personally furnishing and equipping the other ward. Each ward initially accommodated six children in cots and beds.

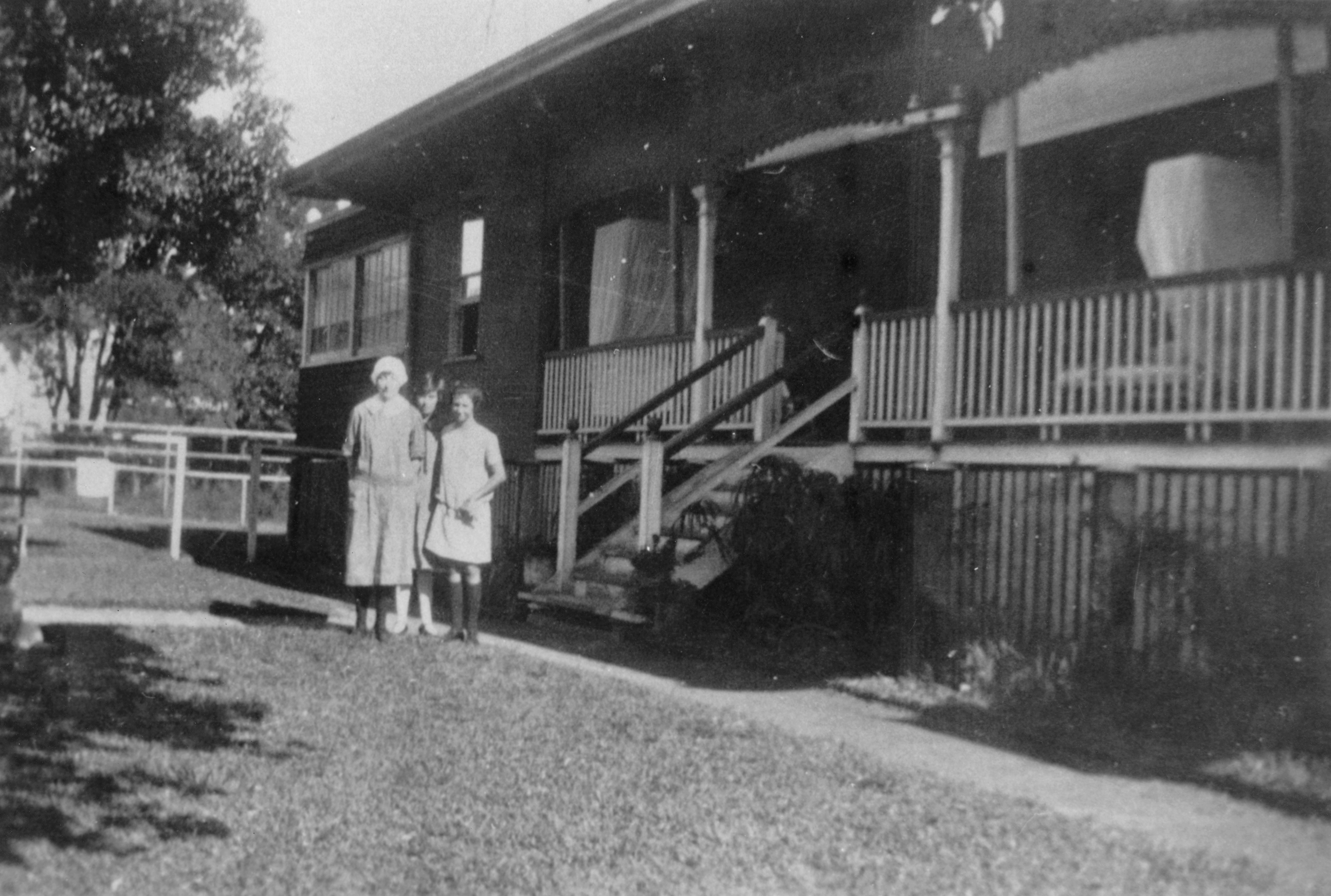
Patients and nurse at the Lady Musgrave Sanatorium

An article in The Queenslander in May 1888 reporting on the formal opening of the building described it thus:

The building is a handsome and substantial wooden structure ...the entrance to the main portion of the home is from the shore. The centre is appropriated to the reception room, and on either side is a large ward; while the nurses' rooms occupy the ends of the verandah. The verandah, which has wide projecting eaves, formed to give the greatest possible protection from wind and rain, while at the same time affording splendid ventilation, will be used in the summertime as a residence and recreation ground for the children. From the reception- room a corridor runs to the kitchen and servants' rooms and on either side are the pantry, store and bathrooms and wc. There are fireplaces in the wards and the whole establishment is so arranged to afford the utmost comfort and convenience to the little patients and those attached to the institution.

— The Queenslander May 1888

The 1888 Annual Report of the Children's Hospital stated:

The rapid improvement of the patients sent down is very marked, showing the institution to be salubrious; and the work being put in hand by the Sandgate Council - viz., forming the Esplanade (now Allpass Parade) in front and perfecting the drainage and levelling the sports ground at the back—will, when completed—make the sanatorium all that can be desired.

The sanatorium was also used as a place of rest and training for nurses from the Children's Hospital and respite for families who had "sickly" children. The yearly report of 1896–97 states that 87 children passed through the sanatorium. In 1923 the Brisbane Courier reports that the sanatorium committee met to discuss the disposal of the Agnes Thorn legacy. "The committee intends to lay out the legacy, which with the Government subsidy totals 450 pounds, in something of a permanent character, such as a memorial to the donor, who was well known to old Sandgate residents." It is unclear whether the plan for a memorial ever eventuated. We can assume, however, that some of the funds went towards extending the building. The Courier reported on a "novelty coin and jazz evening" held in aid of funds for the sanatorium later in 1923. In describing the evening, reference is made to the new wing "beautifully decorated with mauve and biscuit".

In 1920, the number of children passing through had increased to 162 over the year. Matron Maude Flewell-Smith became Sister-in-charge of the children's sanatorium in 1921, a role she held until 1927 when she was transferred to Brisbane Hospital's Sandgate convalescent home and became Matron of both institutions. Her daughter, Mrs Win Jackman remembers that during this time there was an enclosed bathing area and shed across the road where her mother took children to swim on a daily basis during the summer months.

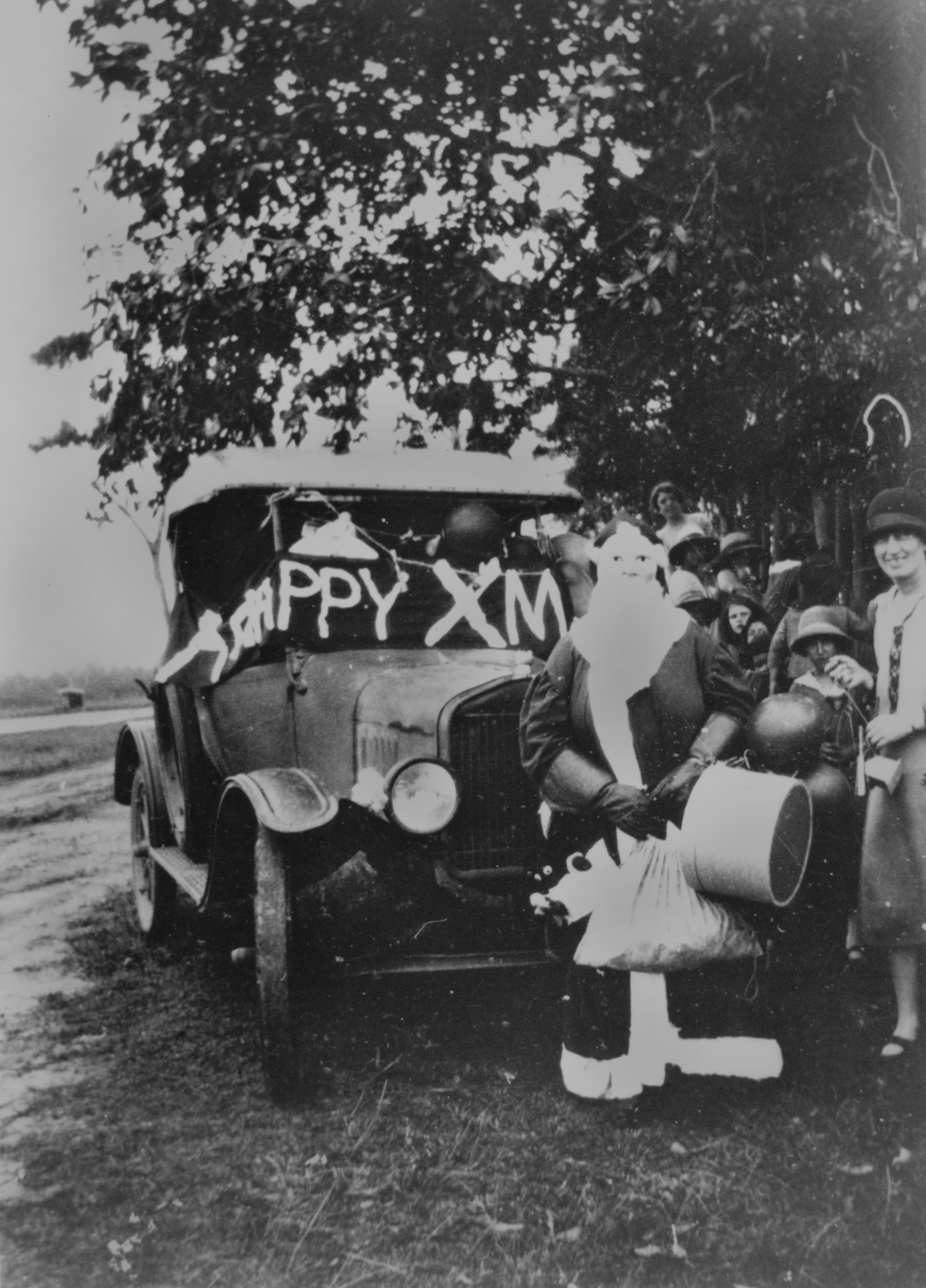
Arrival of Santa Claus at the Lady Musgrave Sanatorium

There was an ongoing relationship between the people of the Sandgate district and the sanatorium. From as early as 1893, local fund raising events took place. Over the years these events included concerts, fish luncheons, dances and euchre parties and several of these were organised by local children. The children's sanatorium enjoyed a special relationship with members of the Toowong branch of the Ministering Children's League who organised a Christmas party at the sanatorium for over twenty years providing toys, Santa Claus and decorations which included the tradition of transforming one of the trees in the garden into a gift-laden Christmas tree.

In 1924, the Brisbane Hospital Board had taken over control of the Children's Hospital and in 1927, the training schools of both hospitals were amalgamated. This signalled the beginnings of changes in hospital administration and practices that would lead to the closure of the sanatorium by the Hospital Board in 1931. Children were then transferred to Brisbane Hospital's convalescent home located nearby in Flinders Parade which by this stage accommodated women only.

It appears the building remained vacant for several years, although local residents recall "state children" living there. Notification of land for sale by auction as a Perpetual Town Lease appeared on the 16 November 1939. James Brown took up the lease in perpetuity from the first of April 1940 at a yearly rent of five pounds, five shillings. The area of one rood ten perches was considerably smaller than the 2 roods 16 perches (2,400 m^{2}) of the original Government reserve.

Sandgate District Historical Society's journal By the Seaside tells that James Brown started an old men's home and rental was five shillings per week, meals not included. In order to accommodate the tenants, Mr Brown carried out work subdividing the rooms. In 1946 the lease was transferred to William Austin Fitzgerald and Mary Violet Fitzgerald on 28 March. Fitzgerald was the local stationmaster and used Musgrave House as accommodation for railway workers. Mrs Norma Turbet took over the lease in September 1960, eventually purchased the land at a cost of $3000 in 1980 and then sold the property in August 1999.

== Description ==
Musgrave House is a low set timber building with a hipped, painted corrugated iron roof located on a corner block overlooking Cabbage Tree Creek and the foreshore reserve. The building faces south-east and the large block backs on to the Sandgate Golf Course. The building has a strong symmetry with a centrally located front verandah, central steps and extensions at each end.

Wide eaves overhang the verandah which has a delicately detailed timber valance, dowel balustrades and chamfered timber posts with moulded timber capitals. The verandah has three wide bays with steps centrally located in the middle bay. The wall areas either side of the verandah are clad with vertical tongue-and-groove timber boards and have small sections of exposed timber cross bracing tucked under the eaves. Each contains a double hung timber sash window. The extensions at each end have skillion roofs, are clad with horizontal weatherboards and each has a timber door and set of steps. At the southern corner, the building has sliding, timber framed, multi-paned windows with coloured glass that return around the corner and continue along the western wall. The eastern corner has a timber sill at the same level as the windows but the windows are along the eastern elevation only. The building is set on concrete stumps with timber batten infill.

The verandah is deep, with a tongue-and-groove ceiling and timber cornice. The walls are single skin timber with exposed cross bracing used to decorative purpose, painted in shades of aqua. The floor is covered with a black, bituminous sheet material. Four doorways lead off the verandah, including the entrance door into the central hall. Panelled timber doors with operable glass fanlights are located at each end of the verandah and lead to the former nurses' rooms. These rooms are lined with tongue-and-groove, have remnants of original ventilators and fretwork fanlights over blocked-in doorways that formerly led into the wards. The main entrance of the building consists of two timber doors with four upper panels of glass and a long glass fanlight.

The hallway is wide, has a high ceiling with pale yellow painted tongue-and-groove lining. A rendered brick chimney with a decorative cedar mantelpiece is located on the western wall. The large mirror panel of the mantel is decorated with a painting of birds and flowers. Basic timber bookshelves are mounted on the eastern wall in the space formerly occupied by another chimney. Timber, wall-mounted lockers are to be found either side of the wide doorway that leads into the back section of the building.

Panelled timber doors with fretwork fanlights are opposite each other at the back of the hall. They each lead into large rooms, formerly the wards of the sanatorium, now subdivided into four small rooms. These rooms do not have full height partitions and the space of the wards is discernible. The raked ceiling is lined with tongue-and-groove with two horizontal bracing members running across the room at the same level as the top of the walls. Light fittings and switches are suspended from these members. The northern face of the ceiling has a centrally located, timber framed, fixed glass skylight whilst on the western and eastern walls respectively, there are small corrugated fibreglass panels that also let in light. A section of rendered brick provides evidence of the chimney once located in the eastern ward. The chimney remains in the western ward, however, it has been blocked up and there is no fireplace. Evidence of windows is visible along the northern walls of both wards.

The side extensions are accessed via partially enclosed passageways at the back of the building. Between the wards and these passageways are lean-to additions with skillion roofs that each contain a further two rooms. At the western end of the building there is also a timber toilet block with terrazzo floors attached at the northern side of the passageway. The western extension contains four equal sized rooms, with three-quarter height, fibrous-cement partitions and lino floors, the eastern extension is divided into five small rooms. The perimeter walls have multi-paned, coloured glass sliding windows and timber sills with tongue and groove lining below. Many of the rooms are furnished with cast iron beds from the sanatorium. Original doors are located in the wall between the former ward and the eastern extension.

The kitchen and former maids' quarters are located at the end of the hallway in a small building semi-detached from the main building. There is a small north-facing verandah at the back of the kitchen with stairs to the garden that together with an adjacent bedroom forms an extension to the original kitchen. The kitchen building is single skin timber with exposed cross bracing, a hipped corrugated iron roof and a brick chimney on the western wall. The extension is clad with horizontal weatherboards and the verandah has a dowel balustrade and simple valance. The two sash windows have metal window hoods. The kitchen contains an operable, wood-burning stove, sink and a large, old, compartmentalised fridge. There is an outdoor laundry located between the kitchen and toilet areas, adjacent to a septic tank.

A corrugated iron shed with lean-to garage and wood-chop area are to be found in the back section of the block. The garden has no mature vegetation.

== Heritage listing ==
Musgrave House was listed on the Queensland Heritage Register on 22 October 1999 having satisfied the following criteria.

- The place is important in demonstrating the evolution or pattern of Queensland's history.
  Musgrave House is important in demonstrating the development of health services, specifically children's health services, in Queensland. The building demonstrates the growth of the Sandgate-Shorncliffe area as a popular nineteenth-century watering place and the custom of going to the seaside for recuperation following illness. As a convalescent home for the children's hospital, Musgrave House is significant in demonstrating the establishment and development of health services by volunteer effort in early Queensland. Its subsequent use as a boarding house demonstrates the continuing appeal of Sandgate as a location for boarding houses and convalescent homes.
- The place is important in demonstrating the principal characteristics of a particular class of cultural places.
  Musgrave House has architectural and aesthetic significance as an example of the small scale work of architect Richard Gailey and in demonstrating the acceptance of the pavilion plan in hospital design in the 1870s and 80s, evident in the internal volumes and planning.
- The place is important because of its aesthetic significance.
  The building's aesthetic qualities are exemplified by the high pitched roof, exposed cross bracing and carefully detailed verandah.
- The place has a strong or special association with a particular community or cultural group for social, cultural or spiritual reasons.
  Musgrave House has special associations with the Sandgate and Shorncliffe communities. For fifty years local people undertook fund-raising activities in aid of the sanatorium and visiting children and their families were welcomed as part of the wider community of the district.
- The place has a special association with the life or work of a particular person, group or organisation of importance in Queensland's history.
  Musgrave House has a special association with the activities of prominent women of colonial Queensland. The sanatorium was named for Lady Lucinda Musgrave, wife of Sir Anthony Musgrave, Governor of Queensland 1883–1888 and first patroness of the Hospital for Sick Children. There is also a close association with Mary McConnel, founder and chair of the Committee of the Hospital Sick Children, who was prominent in many aspects of life in early Queensland.
