= Shorncliffe, Queensland =

Shorncliffe
- Suburb
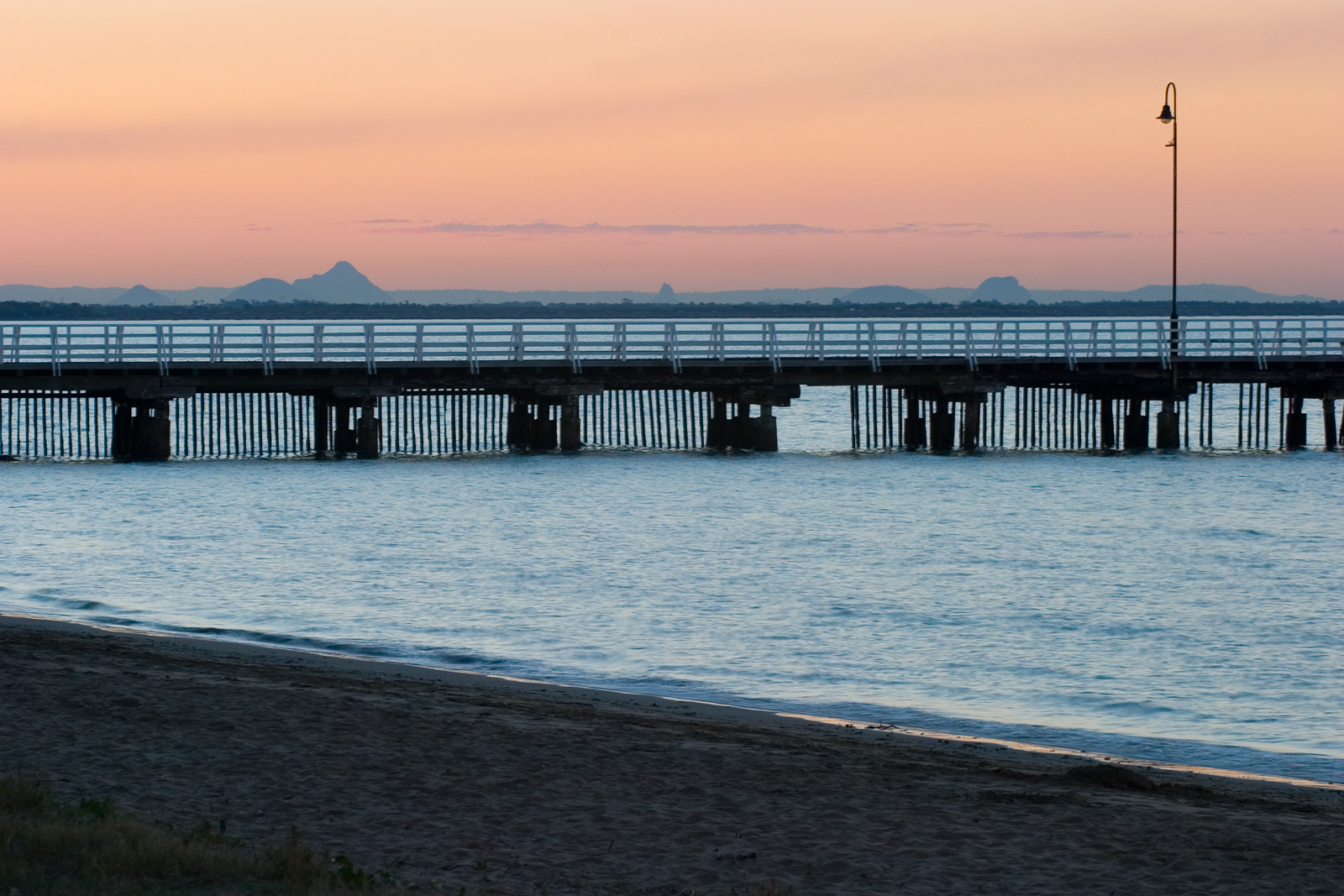
- Shorncliffe pier in the evening

- Interactive map of Shorncliffe
- Coordinates: 27.3272°S 153.0794°E
- Country: Australia
- State: Queensland
- City: Brisbane
- LGA: City of Brisbane (Deagon Ward)
- Location: 21 km (13 mi) NNE of Brisbane CBD

Government
  - State electorate: Sandgate
  - Federal division: Lilley

Area
  - Total: 1.5 km^{2} (0.58 sq mi)

Population
  - Total: 1,907 (2021 census)
  - Density: 1,270/km^{2} (3,290/sq mi)
- Time zone: UTC+10:00 (AEST)
- Postcode: 4017
Suburbs around Shorncliffe
Sandgate	Moreton Bay	Moreton Bay
Sandgate	Shorncliffe	Moreton Bay
Boondall	Boondall	Nudgee Beach

Shorncliffe is a coastal north-eastern suburb in the City of Brisbane, Queensland, Australia. It is on the shore of Bramble Bay, part of Moreton Bay. The suburb attracts visitors to its historic Shorncliffe pier, and Lovers Walk, a walking path along the coastline between Shorncliffe and neighbouring Sandgate. In the 2021 census, Shorncliffe had a population of 1,907 people.

== Geography ==
Robert Dixon's 1842 Survey of Moreton Bay

Shorncliffe is situated in Brisbane's northeastern suburbs on Bramble Bay, part of Moreton Bay.

Shorncliffe is bounded to the north, north-east and east by Bramble Bay and to the south-east, south, and south-west by Cabbage Tree Creek (27.3316°S 153.0832°E), which enters the bay at Cabbage Tree Point (27.3286°S 153.0877°E). The only land boundary is to the neighbouring suburb of Sandgate and all land transport to Shorncliffe must go via Sandgate.

Shorncliffe railway station in Railway Avenue (27.3269°S 153.0806°E) is the terminus of the Shorncliffe railway line (originally known as the Sandgate railway line).

== History ==
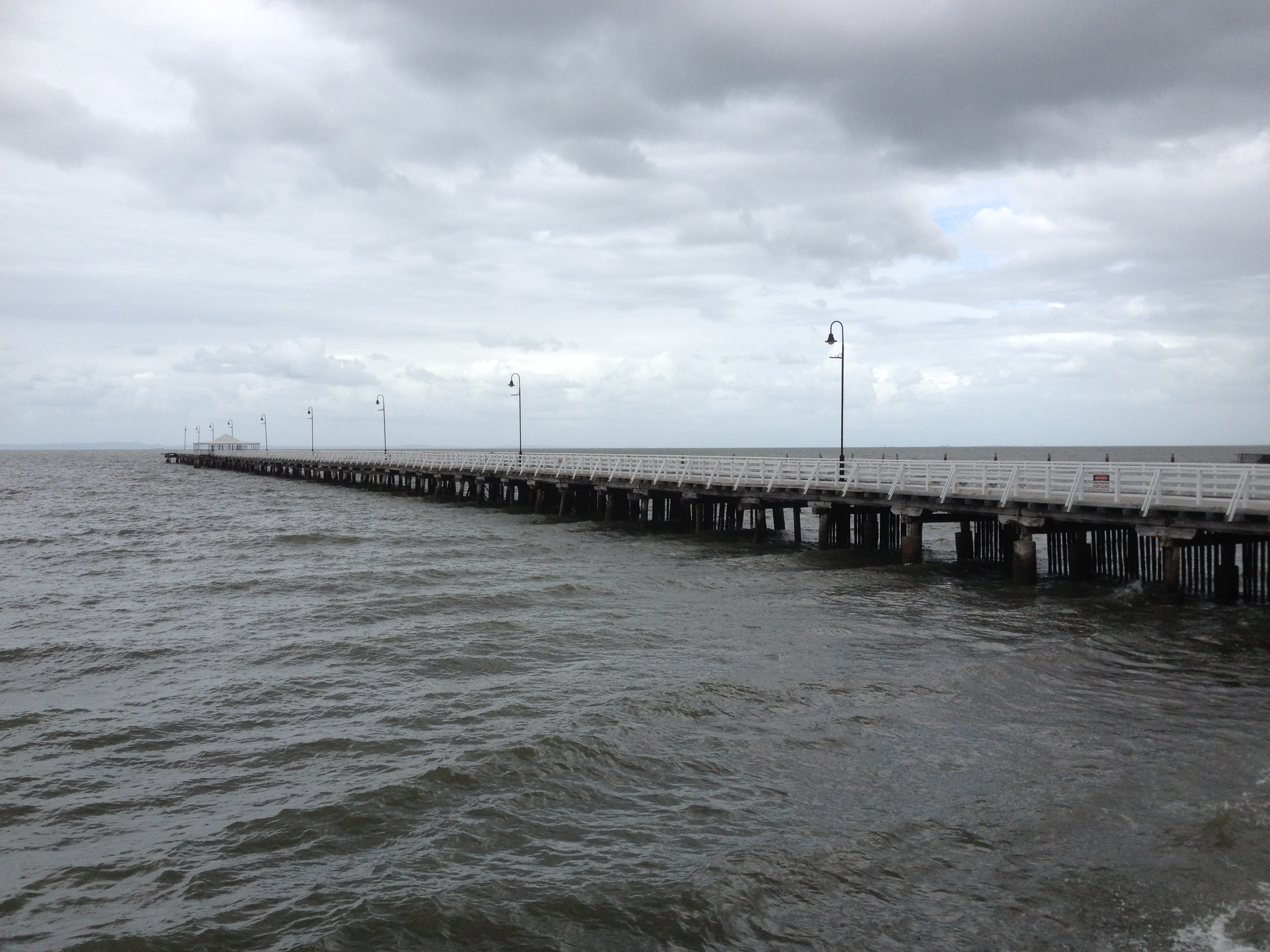
Historical 19th century Shorncliffe pier in 2014

Aboriginal people called the area Warra, meaning an expanse of water.

Cabbage Tree Creek appears on Robert Dixon's 1842 survey of Moreton Bay.

The town was named Sandgate by James Burnett, an early surveyor in the region after the seaside town of Sandgate in Kent, England. Sandgate in Kent had a military camp, Shorncliffe Army Camp, on top of the cliffs adjacent to it. Burnett named the cliffs Shorncliffe after the camp in Kent, due to the similarity of the cliffs. Historically Shorncliffe was regarded as a neighbourhood within Sandgate (which was initially as the independent Town of Sandgate and, from 1925, as a suburb within the City of Brisbane). On 27 July 1991, Shorncliffe became a separate suburb within the City of Brisbane.

The first Shorncliffe pier was built in 1879. It was built by local hotel proprietor William Deagon to attract ferries coming from Brisbane to Sandgate to disembark passengers at Shorncliffe too. It was replaced with a longer pier built from 1883 to 1884, which was further extended to facilitate docking at low tide. Although the last ferry to Shorncliffe was in 1928, it remained a popular with holidaymakers.

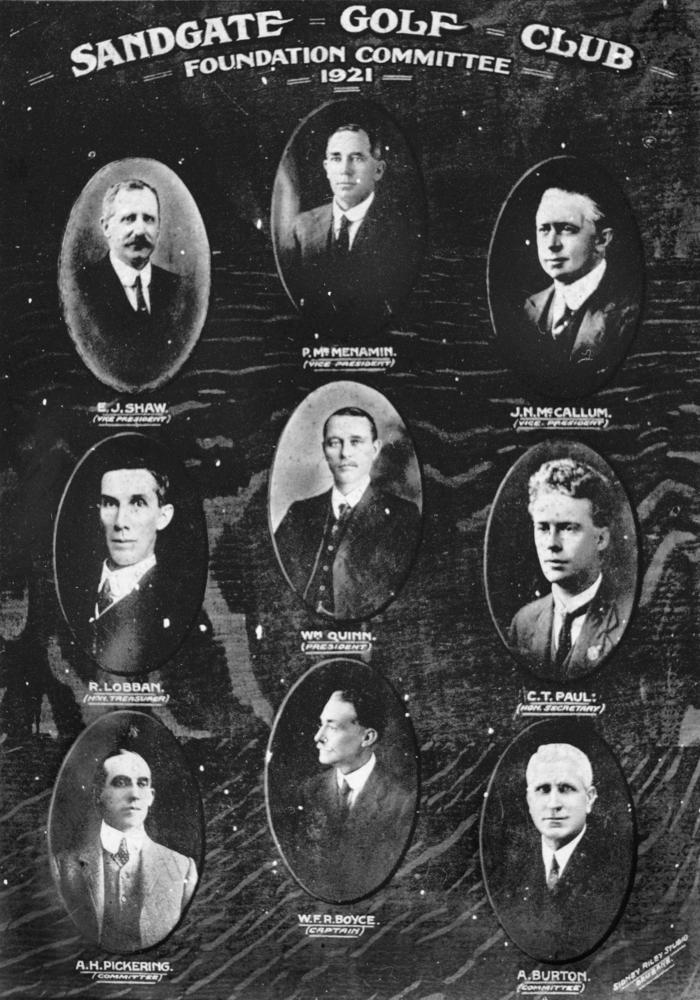
Sandgate Golf Club foundation committee, 1921

In December 1879, allotments in the Town of Sandgate were auctioned by John Cameron. A map advertising the auction shows allotments bordered by Friday, Yundah and Kate Streets, now in Shorncliffe. A map advertising the auction states the land available was subdivisions 1 to 14, of allotments 8, 9, 10 and part of 7, Sec. 3, Town of Sandgate.

A Church of England was built in Signal Row on the corner of Yundah Street (27.3234°S 153.0806°E), then the centre of the developing town. It was opened and dedicated on Sunday 12 December 1880 by Bishop Matthew Hale. It was a timber church 35 by 20 feet (10.7 by 6.1 m) and able to accommodate 150 people. It was designed by architect FDG Stanley and built by contractors Woodward and Betts of Brisbane. In September 1886 it was announced that it would be dedicated to St Nicolas, the patron saint of sailors and sea-farers, a common practice in seaside towns. In 1887 it was enlarged which involved re-orienting the building on the block so the chancel was to the south rather than to the original east. In 1930 the undercroft was enclosed with bricks to form a church wall. The church closed in 1988. The Queensland Government purchased the church and incorporated it into Shorncliffe State School but subsequently demolished it due to extensive termite damage. Its stained glass windows were preserved and are now in St Margaret's Anglican Church at Sandgate.

Shorncliffe Infants State School opened on 28 January 1919 in the old court house beside the police station. It catered for children up to 8 years old. In 1928 it became Shorncliffe State School providing a full primary school service.

The Sandgate Golf Club commenced in 1921 with the official opening of its 9-hole course on 25 November 1922, having obtained a 21-year lease of the site from the Sandgate Town Council for a nominal rental as the Council believed that the golf course would be of lasting benefit.

St Patrick's College opened on 21 January 1952.

In June 1990, the Uniting Church in Australia congregations of Boondall, Brighton, Sandgate and Shorncliffe decided to amalgamate. Their new Sandgate Uniting Church in Deagon was opened in Sunday 20 November 1994.

In March 2012, the Shorncliffe pier was closed for public safety after the discovery of damage done by marine borers and an engineering report revealed the pier could not be saved. The Brisbane City Council demolished it and replaced it with a new pier, designed to be almost identical to the old pier. The new pier opened on 25 March 2016.

== Demographics ==
In the 2011 census, the population of Shorncliffe was 1,914, 49.3% female and 50.7% male. The median age of the Shorncliffe population was 41 years, 4 years above the Australian median. 78% of people living in Shorncliffe were born in Australia, compared to the national average of 69.8%; the next most common countries of birth were England 5.6%, New Zealand 5%, Scotland 0.8%, United States of America 0.7%, Ireland 0.7%. 92.4% of people spoke only English at home; the next most common languages were 0.8% German, 0.5% French, 0.4% Japanese, 0.3% Dutch, 0.3% Serbian.

In the 2016 census, Shorncliffe had a population of 1,870 people.

In the 2021 census, Shorncliffe had a population of 1,907 people.

== Heritage listings ==
Shorncliffe has a number of heritage-listed sites, including:

- Musgrave House, 8 Allpass Parade
- House "Caversham", 74 Allpass Parade
- Cottage, 17 Friday Street
- Shorncliffe State School, 20 Friday Street
- former Baxter's Oyster Saloon, 19 Jetty Street
- House, 30 Palm Avenue
- Shorncliffe Lodge, 16 Park Parade
- House, 22 Park Parade
- House "Haddington", 34 Park Parade
- St Patrick's College, 60 Park Parade
- Moora Park, 65 Park Parade
- Seaview Hotel, 65 Pier Avenue
- Shorncliffe railway station & overbridge, 2 Railway Parade
- Saltwood, 154 Shorncliffe Parade & 71 Swan Street
- House "Kelso", 58 Sunday Street
- House "Ardovie", 11 Swan Street
- former Drew Residence, 20 Wharf Street
- Holland House, 92 Yundah Street

== Education ==
Shorncliffe State School is a government primary (Prep–6) school for boys and girls at Yundah Street (27.3237°S 153.0809°E). In 2018, the school had an enrolment of 345 students with 29 teachers (23 full-time equivalent) and 12 non-teaching staff (8 full-time equivalent).

St Patrick's College is a Catholic primary and secondary (5–12) school for boys at 60 Park Parade (27.3234°S 153.0834°E). In 2018, the school had an enrolment of 1,325 students with 97 teachers (95 full-time equivalent) and 70 non-teaching staff (62 full-time equivalent).

There is no government secondary school in Shorncliffe. The nearest government secondary school is Sandgate District State High School in Deagon to the west.

== Facilities ==
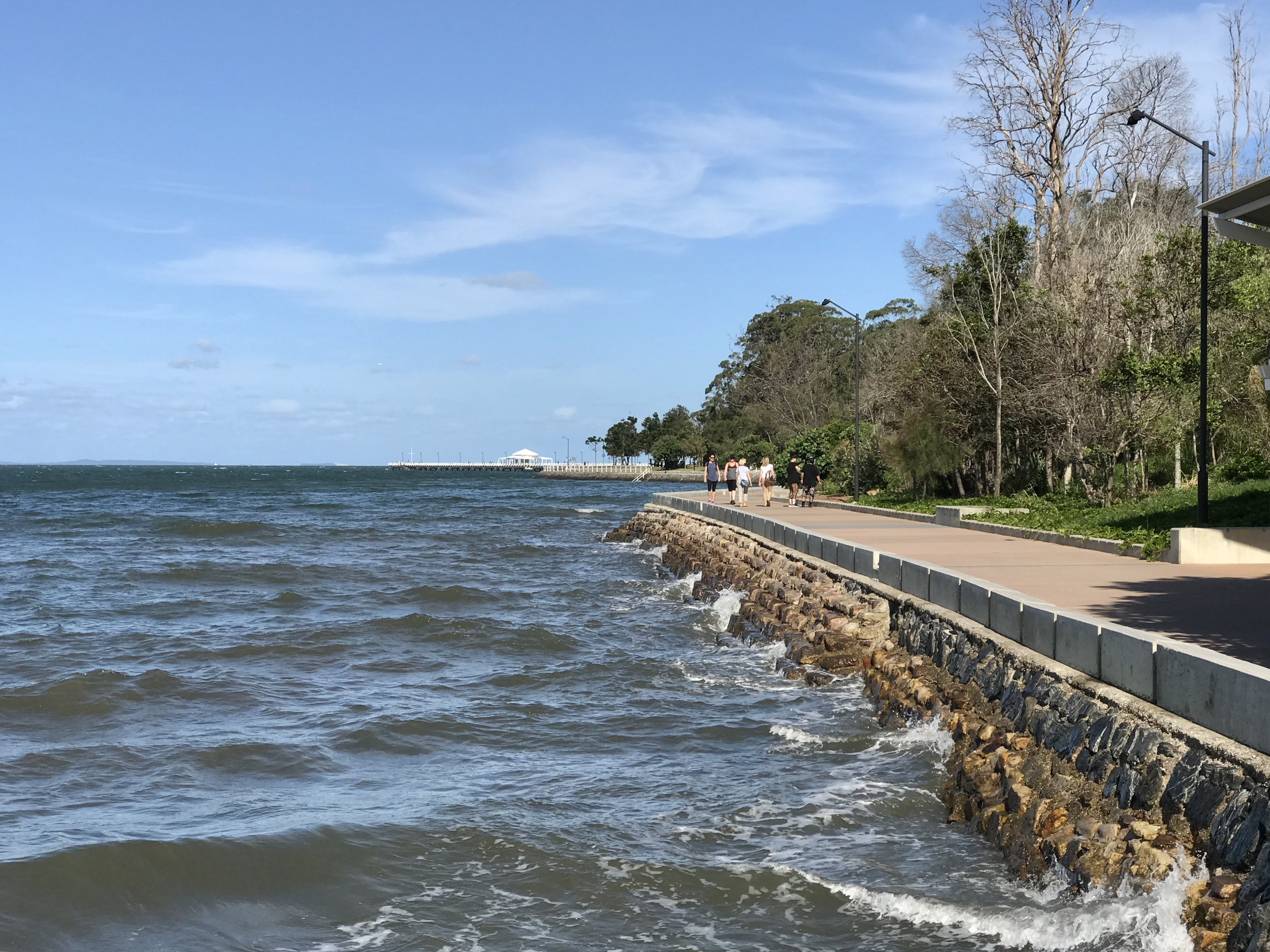
Shorncliffe pier from Lovers Walk between Shorncliffe and Sandgate

The Sandgate Golf Club is located in Allpass Parade.

The Sandgate sub-branch of the Queensland Country Women's Association meets at the Volunteer Marine Rescue Centre at 95 Allpass Parade.

== Attractions ==
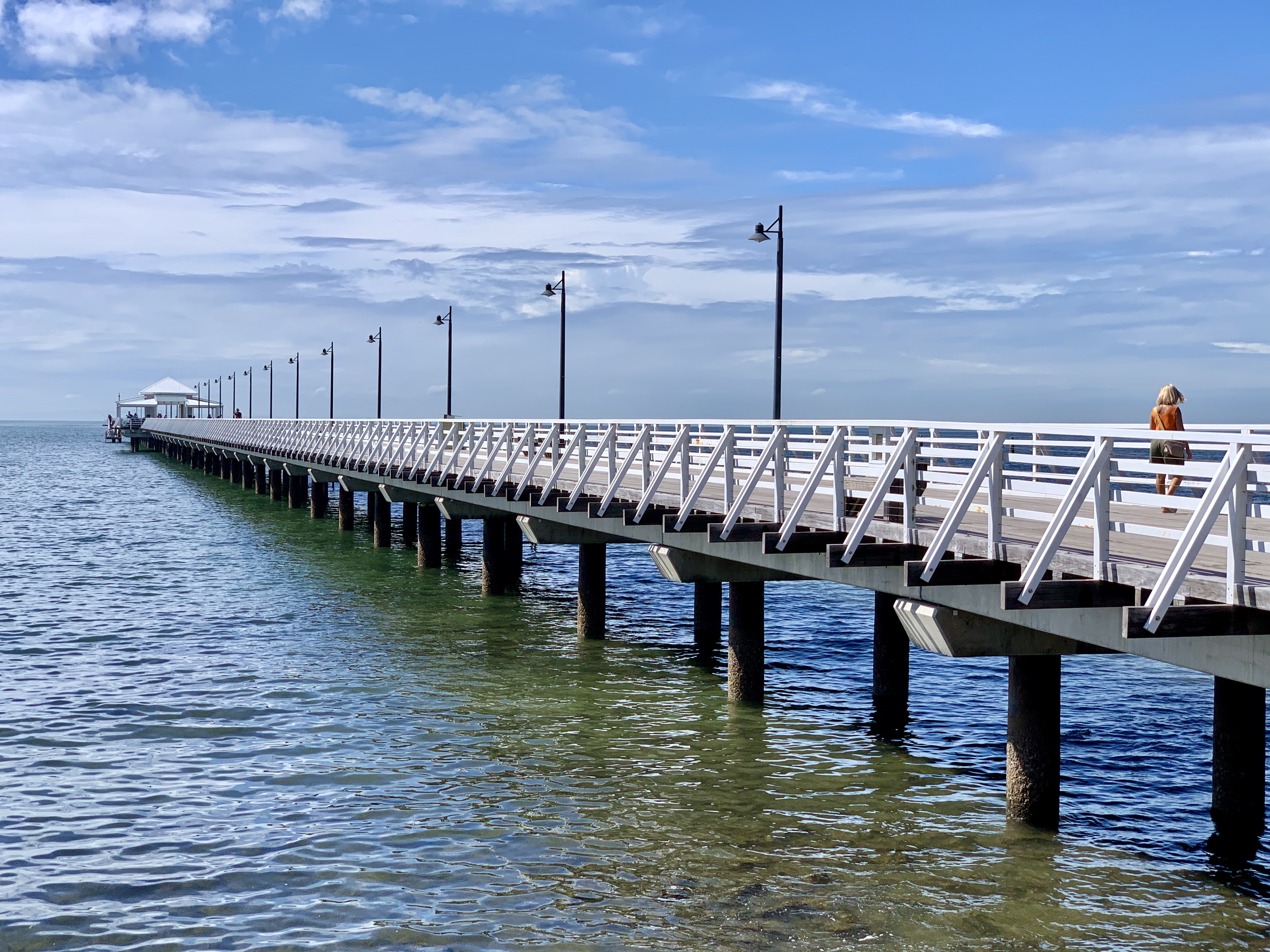
New Shorncliffe pier in 2020

Shorncliffe is a popular Brisbane destination due to its coastline, the historical Shorncliffe pier, which is one of the longest recreational piers in Australia, Lovers Walk, a walking track along the coastline between Shorncliffe and neighbouring Sandgate as well as Moora Park and Beach, which includes a dog off-leash beach.

== Events ==
At times Shorncliffe has different festivals, including The Blue Water Festival whereby that start of the Brisbane to Gladstone yacht race begins from the opening of The Cabbage Tree Creek.
