= Brisbane to Gladstone yacht race =

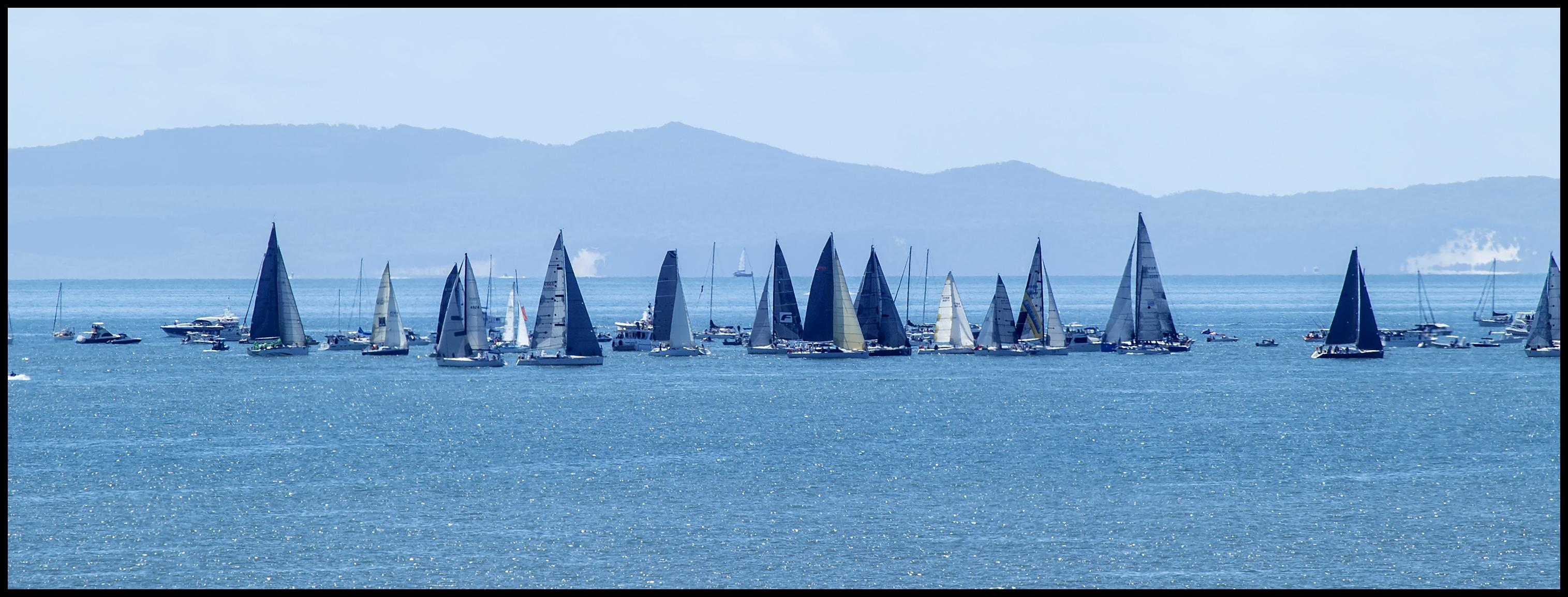
Single hull Yachts waiting for Shorncliffe starters gun, 2016

The Brisbane to Gladstone yacht race is held annually, starting on Good Friday. The premier blue water classic begins from Shorncliffe in Moreton Bay, Queensland, Australia, and finishes in Gladstone Harbour. Yachts compete for the Courier Mail Cup, one of the oldest perpetual trophies in Australia that has been competed for on a continual basis. The finish is hosted by the Port Curtis Sailing Club.

The location of each yacht can be tracked online.

In 2009 as part of the Q150 celebrations, the Brisbane to Gladstone Yacht Race was announced as one of the Q150 Icons of Queensland for its role as an "event and festival".

== History ==
The Queensland Cruising Yacht Club was established in 1948 to organise the Brisbane to Gladstone Yacht Race. The first race was held during Easter 1949. The first race saw seven vessels start, two of which carried radios while Brisbane’s Homing Pigeon Club supplied pigeons to the others for position reporting. Each yacht issued with birds was to release two each day.

The race record of 16 hours, 53 minutes and 57 seconds was set by Black Jack in 2018.

The 2020 race was cancelled due to the COVID-19 pandemic.

In 2023, the race marked its 75th anniversary with a fleet of 47 vessels competing.

== Course ==
The course leads the yachts northwards from the start line at the Shorncliffe pier to a turning mark off Redcliffe before joining the main channel out of Moreton Bay. Yachts leave Fraser Island to port before passing Breaksea spit and then leaving Lady Elliot Island to port. The final stage of the race is often the hardest as the yachts make their way up Gladstone Harbour to the finish line just outside Auckland Creek.

== Winners ==
Year	Line Honors winner	Courier Mail Cup winner	PHRF/THCF Handicap winner	IRC Handicap winner	IOR Handicap winner – ORCi from 2012	IMS Handicap winner – Shorthanded from 2016	Arbitrary Handicap winner – Vintage after 2008	Channel Handicap winner – Veteran after 2000	Cruising winner
1949	Sea Prince	Sea Prince	Sea Prince	-	-	-	-	-	-
1948	Kyeema	Kyeema	Kyeema	-	-	-	-	-	-
1951	Norseman	Norseman	Norseman	-	-	-	-	-	-
1952	Alvis	Norseman	Norseman	-	-	-	-	-	-
1953	Alvis	Joybird	Joybird	-	-	-	-	-	-
1954	Alvis	Norseman	Norseman	-	-	-	-	-	-
1955	Flying Saucer	Norseman	Norseman	-	-	-	-	-	-
1956	Alvis	Norseman	Norseman	-	-	-	-	-	-
1957	Alvis	Bluenose	Bluenose	-	-	-	-	-	-
1958	Solo	Solo	Solo	-	-	-	-	-	-
1959	Solo	Solo	Solo	-	-	-	-	-	-
1960	Solo	Mouse Of Malham	Mouse Of Malham	-	-	-	-	-	-
1961	Nocturne	Cimba	Cimba	-	-	-	-	-	-
1962	Solo	Norla	Norla	-	-	-	-	-	-
1963	Solo	Mouse Of Malham	Mouse Of Malham	-	-	-	-	-	-
1964	Ilina	Pagan	Pagan	-	-	-	-	-	-
1965	Ilina	Valhalla	Valhalla	-	-	-	-	-	-
1966	Mr Christian	Mister Christian	Mister Christian	-	-	-	-	-	-
1967	Laurabada	Kurura	Kurura	-	-	-	-	-	-
1968	Ilina	Sequana	Sequana	-	-	-	-	-	-
1969	Sundowner	Sundowner	Sundowner	-	-	-	-	-	-
1970	Christina	Christina	Christina	-	-	-	-	-	-
1971	Caprice Of Huon	Wistari	Wistari	-	-	-	-	-	-
1972	Kintama	Harmony	Harmony	-	-	-	-	-	-
1973	Apollo	Rum Runner	Rum Runner	-	-	-	-	-	-
1974	Apollo	Malalla	Malalla	-	-	-	-	-	-
1975	Ballyhoo	Ballyhoo	Ballyhoo	-	-	-	-	-	-
1976	Helsal	Wistari	Wistari	-	-	-	-	-	-
1977	Natelle II	Wistari	Wistari	-	-	-	-	-	-
1978	Apollo	Nyamba	Nyamba	-	-	-	-	-	-
1979	Apollo	Incredible	-	-	Incredible	-	Enid	-	Fortitude
1980	Fanny Adams	Diamond Cutter	-	-	Diamond Cutter	-	Helena	-	Fortitude
1981	Siska II	Beach Inspector	-	-	Beach Inspector	-	Helena	-	Fortitude
1982	Apollo	Wistari	-	-	Wistari	-	Enid	-	Caretta
1983	Apollo	Di Hard	-	-	Di Hard	-	Courtisane	-	Fortitude
1984	Apollo	Scampi A	-	-	Scampi A	-	Status Quo	-	Fortitude
1985	The Office	Public Nuisance	-	-	Public Nuisance	-	Eye Witness	-	Envy II
1986	Windward Passage	Saltash II	-	-	Saltash II	-	Bolero	-	Norseman Q
1987	Castaway Enterprise	Sellers Witchcraft II	-	-	Sellers Witchcraft II	-	Boundary Rider	-	-
1988	Hammer Of Queensland	Scampi Awlgrip	-	-	Scampi Awlgrip	-	Rager	Fine Cotton	-
1989	The Innkeeper	Leroy Brown	-	-	Leroy Brown	-	Troopship	Alfa Power	Silver Shadow
1990	Bobsled	The Gambler	-	-	The Gambler	Zap	Jacqui	-	Nauges
1991	Hammer Of Queensland	Leroy Brown	-	-	Leroy Brown	Phoenix	Lets Go	-	Skimmer
1992	Bobsled	Saltash II	-	-	Saltash II	Corrobboree	Montego	-	Laurabada
1993	Bobsled	Saltash II	-	-	Saltash II	Outsider	Air Apparent	-	Laurabada
1994	Innkeeper Petaluma Wines	Odette	-	-	-	Odette	Escape	-	Fortress
1995	Colorado Bobsled	Millennium	-	-	-	Millennium	Fortress	-	Impetuous
1996	Hammer Of Queensland	Restless	-	-	-	Restless	Springloaded	-	Maggie IV
1997	Foxtel Amazon	No Fearr	-	-	-	No Fearr	White Ice	-	White Ice
1998	Hammer Of Queensland	Quest	Scampi A	-	-	Quest	-	-	Seaduction
1999	Nortress G-Whizz	Saltash II	Wistari	-	-	Saltash II	Wistari	Sea Noble Engineering	Grey Seal
2000	Nortress G-Whizz	Scampi A	Exocet	Scampi A	-	-	-	Exocet	Koomooloo
2001	Grundig Xena	Saltash II	Belle	Saltash II	-	Saltash II	-	Saltash II	Pagan
2002	Grundig	Grundig	Gemini Dream	Grundig	-	Saltash II	-	Sassy	-
2003	Grundig	Saltash II	Ichi Ban	Saltash II	-	Saltash II	-	Dancing Lady	Meltemi
2004	Skandia	AAPT	Kickatinalong	AAPT	-	Ichi Ban	-	Kickatinalong	-
2005	AAPT	Saltash II	Lady Katherine	Saltash II	-	Saltash II	-	Kickatinalong	-
2006	Heaven Can Wait	Corum	Heaven Can Wait	Corum	-	-	-	Lloyd Brokers Too Impetuous	Marriah
2007	Ichi Ban	Saltash II	Baltic	Saltash II	-	-	-	Saltash II	WomenRace4Redkite South Passage
2008	Ichi Ban	Quantum Racing	Ryugin FGI	Quantum Racing	-	-	-	Sassy	Sunshine Sailing Australia
2009	Black Jack 66	Quantum Racing	Shogun	Quantum Racing	-	-	Pagan	Mondo	Seafarer 4
2010	Black Jack 66	Wedgetail	Zulu Chief	Wedgetail	-	-	-	Sassy	Eressea
2011	Lahana	Hooligan	Too Impetuous	Hooligan	-	-	-	Too Impetuous	Eressea
2012	Wild Thing	Black Jack 66	Marriah	Black Jack 66	Black Jack 66	-	-	Marriah	Eressea
2013	Wild Thing	Wedgetail	Wedgetail	Wedgetail	Immigrant	-	-	The Gambler	South Passage
2014	Black Jack 77	Alive	Alive	Alive	Alive	-	-	Wistari	Eressea
2015	Black Jack 77	Black Jack 77	Black Jack 77	Black Jack 77	Alive	-	-	Corrobboree	South Passage
2016	Black Jack 77	Black Jack 77	Mr Kite	Black Jack 77	Corrobboree	Apriori	-	Corrobboree	Marriah
2017	Black Jack	Ichi Ban	Flying Colours 2	Ichi Ban	Alive	Apriori	-	Flying Colours 2	Marriah
2018	Black Jack	Ichi Ban	Fusion	Ichi Ban	Ichi Ban	Apriori	Wistari	Argus	Team Hollywood
2019	Black Jack	Envy Scooters	Kerisma	Envy Scooters	Envy Scooters	Dreamlover	-	Sassy	Pagan
2020	Race Cancelled	Race Cancelled	Race Cancelled	Race Cancelled	Race Cancelled	Race Cancelled	Race Cancelled	Race Cancelled	Race Cancelled
2021	Maritimo	Wistari	Wistari	Wistari	Wistari		Wistari		Coopers

=== Key ===
- Skandia's race record of 20 hours, 24 minutes, 50 seconds
- Most Line Honors wins – Apollo
- Most Courier Mail Cup wins – Saltash II
- Most PHRF/THCF Handicap wins - Norseman
- Most IRC Handicap wins - Saltash II
- Most IOR Handicap wins - Saltash II
- Most IMS Handicap wins - Saltash II
- Most Arbitrary Handicap wins - Helena/Enid Tie
- Most Cruising Handicap wins – Fortitude

=== Consecutive participation ===
Laurabada raced 51 Brisbane to Gladstone Yacht races, sailing 43 with her builder Ivan Holm Snr at the helm and 8 races with Ivan Holm Jnr as skipper. The majestic ketch contested her 50th race in 2002 and 51st race in 2018. Wistari has now sailed 52 Brisbane to Gladstone Yacht Races as of 2022, sailing 28 with her designer and builder Noel Patrick at the helm and 24 with son Scott Patrick as skipper.

=== Multiple Courier Mail Cup winners ===
- Saltash II (Ian and Bill Wright) 1986, 1992, 1993, 1999, 2001, 2003, 2005, 2007
  - Fastest corrected time, 1993: 21 hours 15 minutes 54 seconds (race record)
  - Average handicap rated speed: 14.48 knots
- Norseman (A Wilson) 1951, 1952, 1954, 1955, 1956 (Handicap)
  - Fastest corrected time 1955: 29 h 5 min 06 s
- Wistari (Noel Patrick, Scott Patrick) 1971, 1976, 1977, 1982, 2021
  - Fastest corrected time 1976: 26 h 01 min 24 s
- Scampi A (Ross Perrins, Colin Loel) 1984, 1988, 2000
  - Fastest corrected time 1988: 28 h 42 min 07 s
- Solo (Vic Meyer) 1958, 1959 (Line Honours and Handicap winner)
  - Fastest corrected time 1958: 27 h 48 min 37 s
- Leroy Brown (Warren Wieckmann) 1989, 1991
  - Fastest corrected time 1991: 40 h 07 min 24 s
- Mouse Of Malham (Bill Dayan-Smith, Norman R Wright Jnr) 1960, 1963
  - Fastest corrected time 1963: 29 h 31 min 24 s
- Quantum Racing (Ray Roberts) 2008, 2009
  - Fastest corrected time 2008: 35 h 08 min 44 s
- Wedgetail (Bill Wild) 2010, 2013
  - Fastest corrected time 2010: 34 h 44 min 45 s
- Black Jack no.77 (Peter Harburg) 2015, 2016 Fastest corrected time 2015: 50 h 55 min 11 s

=== Multiple winning skippers ===
- Jack Rooklyn (Apollo) 1973, 1974, 1978, 1979 (Ballyhoo) 1975 (Maxi Apollo) 1982, 1983, 1984
  - Fastest elapsed time 1982, Maxi Apollo: 29 hours 46 minutes 56 seconds
- Fred Markwell (Alvis) 1952, 1953, 1954, 1956,1957
  - Fastest elapsed time 1956: 48 h 29 min 29 s
- Vic Meyer (Solo)1958, 1959, 1960, 1962, 1963
  - Fastest elapsed time 1958: 34 h 52 min 50 s
- Arthur Bloore (The Office) 1985, (Hammer Of Queensland) 1988, 1991, 1996, 1998
  - Fastest elapsed time 1988: 29 h 53 min 47 s
- Sean Langman (Grundig Xena, Grundig, AAPT - all the same boat) 2001, 2002, 2003, 2005
  - Fastest elapsed time 2004: 20 h 36 min 48 s
- Kerry Spencer (Bobsled) 1992, 1993, 1995
  - Fastest elapsed time 1993: 21 h 59 min 43 seconds
- Mark Bradford (Black Jack – two different boats with the same name) 2012, 2015, 2016
  - Fastest correct time 2012: 36 h 15 min 56 s
- Rupert Murdoch (Ilina) 1964, 1965
  - Fastest elapsed time 1964: 33 h 23 min 54 s
- Robert Bird (Bobsled) co-skipper 1993, 1995
  - Fastest elapsed time 1993: 21 h 59 min 43 s
- Bill Wild (Wedgetail) 2010, 2013
  - Fastest correct time 2010: 34 h 44 min 45 s

=== Fastest time to complete the course ===
Black Jack 100

- 2018 course time: 16h 53min 57s
- Average speed: 18.23 knots

== See also ==
- Sport in Queensland
