= Port Curtis Sailing Club Clubhouse =

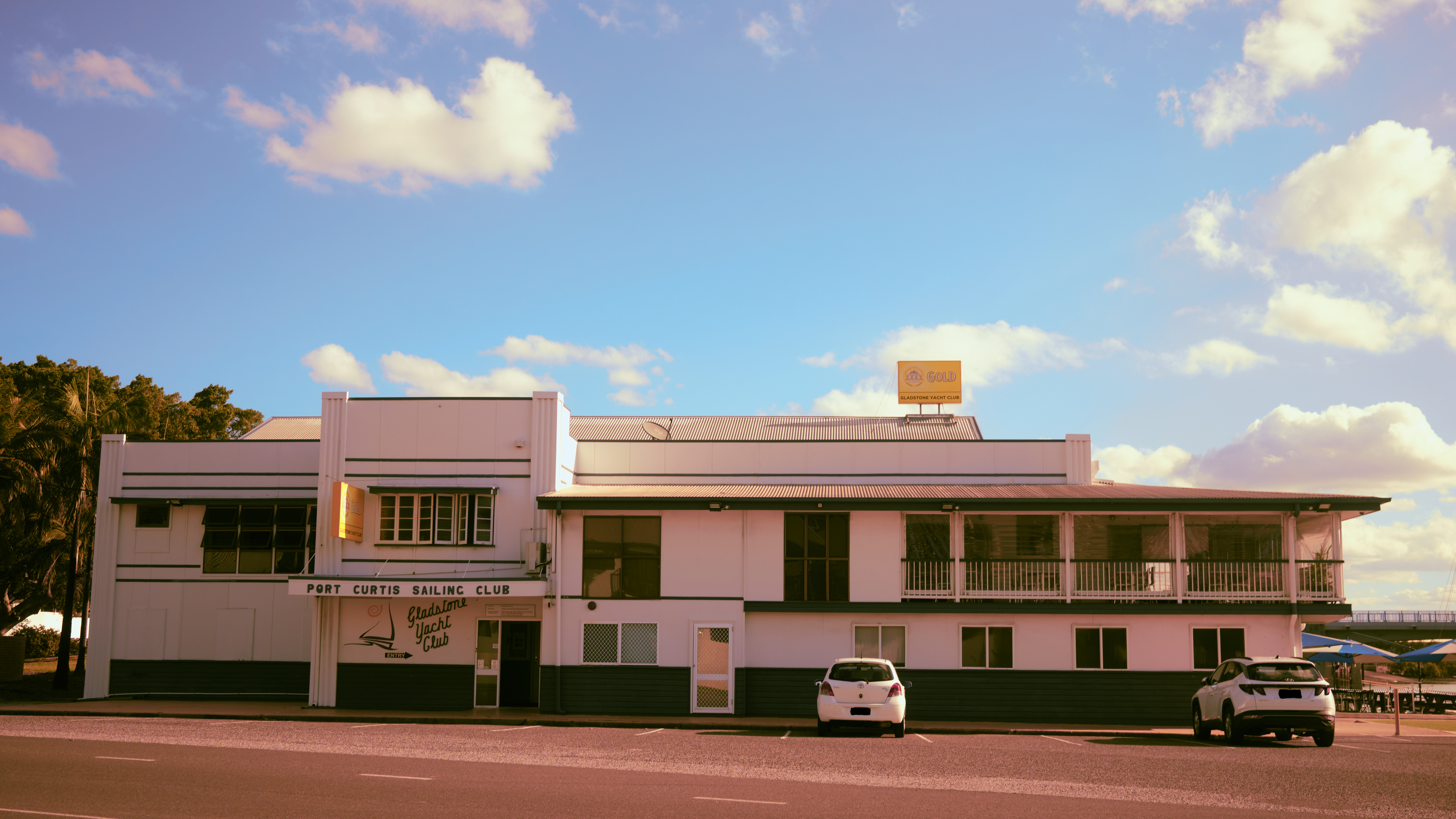
- Port Curtis Sailing Club in 2025

- Location within Queensland Location within Australia
- 23.8381°S 151.2522°E
- Location: 1 Goondoon Street, Gladstone Central, Gladstone, Gladstone Region, Queensland, Australia

History
- Design period: 1940s–1960s (post-World War II)
- Built: 1949–1959

Site notes
- Architect: Philip Hanman

Queensland Heritage Register
- Official name: Port Curtis Sailing Club Clubhouse, Gladstone Yacht Club
- Type: state heritage (built)
- Designated: 26 June 2009
- Reference no.: 602711
- Significant period: 1959–
- Significant components: clubroom/s / clubhouse, sports facilities, other – recreation/entertainment: component

Port Curtis Sailing Club Clubhouse is a heritage-listed club house at 1 Goondoon Street, Gladstone Central, Gladstone, Gladstone Region, Queensland, Australia. It was designed by Philip Hanman and built from 1949 to 1959. It is also known as Gladstone Yacht Club. It was added to the Queensland Heritage Register on 26 June 2009.

== History ==
The Port Curtis Sailing Club Clubhouse was constructed between 1949 and 1959 by members of the Port Curtis Sailing Club. The club was formed in 1941 by the sailing fraternity of Gladstone to provide facilities and support for the sport, as well as a venue for social functions. While renovations were undertaken to the building in recent years, the core of the post-war building remains as a landmark on Auckland Inlet. The clubhouse evolved from an initial concept as a single-storeyed boat storage facility to a double-storeyed building with boat storage underneath and an entertainment and dining venue above. The clubhouse is known Australia-wide for its association with the Brisbane to Gladstone Yacht Race, the finish of which is hosted by the Port Curtis Sailing Club. This race has been a highlight of the Australian sailing calendar since its inauguration in 1949 and was the first ocean race held in Queensland.

Sailing clubs for both recreation and competitive sport have been active in Queensland since the late nineteenth century, including: Brisbane Sailing Club (established 1885), Fitzroy Sailing Club at Rockhampton (1895), Sandgate Yacht Club (1897), Townsville Yacht Club (1901), Royal Queensland Yacht Squadron (1902), Oxley Sailing Club (1902), South Brisbane Sailing Club (1903); Cleveland Yacht Club (1904), and Cairns Yacht Club (1908). New clubs formed after World War Two and many new and existing clubs began building clubhouses at this time. The Townsville club credits the post-war Olympic Games for a renewed interest in sailing, while others suggest returned servicemen seeking adventure and camaraderie led to the formation of new clubs. In terms of social regattas, it is likely that the improved economy, growth in car ownership and improved roads allowed sailors to tow their boats to compete in regattas around the State. It is clear that many clubs utilised remnant war-time buildings to create clubhouses and most, like Port Curtis Sailing Club, took advantage of member's skills, enthusiasm and business contacts in the construction process.

Sailing and rowing were popular activities on the Gladstone harbour (Port Curtis). Regattas were often held on Separation Day (10 December) in the 1870s. By 1890 regattas were held annually on Easter Monday. These were the forerunners of the more recent Brisbane to Gladstone Yacht Race held over the Easter weekend. Rowing was also popular on the harbour. Twenty four people with an interest in rowing or sailing met on 3 April 1941 at Feros' Paramount Cafe and formed the Port Curtis Aquatic Club. Shortly after that the club sought permission from the Gladstone Harbour Board to place a set of rails in Auckland Creek for launching and retrieving boats. The war led to a downturn in sailing activities, but the club reformed in 1946. Members quickly realised that sailing was the main interest so on 3 September 1947 it was renamed the Port Curtis Sailing Club. Fund raising to build a clubhouse commenced and the club asked the Gladstone Harbour Board for a site. In July 1948 the Gladstone Town Council agreed to grant the remainder of the Reserve for Baths (between the baths and Auckland Inlet) to the Gladstone Harbour Board, provided the council could continue to access the drainage pipes for the baths. The baths which had been built by the council in 1936 were situated at the corner of Goondoon and Lord Streets. By granting the remainder of the reserve to the Harbour Board, the council was in essence, providing a site for the sailing club on the harbour front.

In 1948 the Queensland Cruising Yacht Club (QCYC) approached the Port Curtis Sailing Club with a proposal to establish a race between Brisbane and Gladstone. This was to be the first ocean racing event in Queensland. Gladstone Mayor Jack O'Malley was enthusiastic about the proposal, although he had little local support initially. The sailing club began planning for the event, with a particular focus on the finish of the race which was to be at the Auckland Point Jetty. Six weeks prior to the event, Gladstone was hit by a destructive cyclone. The sailing club still wanted to proceed with building a club house and wrote to the Harbour Board in March 1949 seeking clarification of the dimensions of the land it intended to lease to the club for its clubhouse. In April 1949 the club made a request to the Gladstone Town Council for number of substantial trees knocked over by the cyclone on Council land. Council agreed and these trees were used in the construction of a clubhouse.

The inaugural Brisbane to Gladstone Yacht Race was held at Easter 1949. No Gladstone yachts participated in the race although a number of locals crewed on the winning boats. Despite particularly heavy weather, the race was deemed a success and plans were made by the Port Curtis Sailing Club and the QCYC to ensure it was an annual event. As local interest in sailing grew, so did the need for a Gladstone club house. In 1950 a resurvey was undertaken of the Gladstone baths (R.270, Portion 22) and the land between the baths and Auckland Inlet. The latter was to be the site of the Port Curtis Sailing Club Clubhouse, but vested as a Reserve for Harbour Purposes (R.301, Portion 119).

Club members continued to procure more trees felled during the 1949 cyclone, this time from local graziers with family interests in the club. Members were involved in the long process of milling the logs. In 1953 land was reclaimed for a clubhouse. The fill came from Auckland Hill, which had been successively excavated for fill over the years, particularly in the 1950s. Locals drew up a basic design for the clubhouse, initially for a single-storeyed boat and gear shed. When extra timber was procured, architect Phil Hanman refined the plans to include two storeys with a dance hall on the top floor. While the initial funds were raised through debentures, the construction of the dance hall was specifically to provide an income stream for the club. Other fundraising means included art unions, dances, socials and door knocking for donations.

The Gladstone Port Authority lent the club a pile driver and timber piles were driven into the reclaimed land to depths ranging between 8 and 15 feet (2.4 and 4.6 m). In 1954 the piles were capped with concrete and the construction of the frame work began. All work was done by volunteer labour and supervised by professional tradesmen. Building materials were sourced through a number of means including donations from local businesses. Construction was inhibited by post-war building material regulations, in which all available materials were destined for housing. At first, permission was only granted to build and roof the lower storey, with the upper floor waiting until material shortages eased. One section of the building was completed by 3 May 1955 and club members were able to move in.

In November 1957 the Gladstone Harbour Board wrote to the local Land Commissioner stating that the Sailing Club Building was in fact 2 feet (0.61 m) beyond the official boundary of the reserve, towards Auckland Inlet. The boundaries were then extended by an Order in Council on 19 June 1958, without re-surveying. The sailing club building was completed by the chairman of the Gladstone Harbour Board, local councillor and builder, Mr W R Golding MBE. The official opening was held on the evening of 28 March 1959 in time for the Easter Regatta.

The Port Curtis Sailing Club's clubhouse was erected during a period of expanded interest in amateur sailing in Queensland after World War Two. At least eleven clubhouses have been identified as being constructed for Queensland sailing/yacht clubs in the 1940s and 1950s and like Port Curtis Sailing Club premises, most utilised donated materials and labour: Sandgate Skiff Club (1944), Southport Sailing Club (1946), Sandgate Sailing Club (1948), Townsville Sailing Club (1948), Maryborough Sailing Club (1950), North Queensland Cruising Yacht Club (1952), Oxley (1953), Bulimba (1953), South Brisbane (1956), Darling Point (1958) and Port Curtis (1959). Sandgate Skiff Club relocated a former church hall to its Cabbage Tree Creek site, near to where the Sandgate Yacht Club had reconstructed old army huts into the Sandgate Memorial Boat Shed in 1948 (later handed over to the Queensland Cruising Yacht Club). Maryborough Sailing Club initially used an old World War Two Navy boatshed and built a clubhouse beside it in 1950, using new and recycled materials. The North Queensland Cruising Yacht Club in Bowen relocated a former WRAAF Mess Hall and like Port Curtis, raised money through debentures for the 1952 project. The Oxley Sailing Club had been given a parcel of riverfront land. Timber was donated in 1951 for the first boat shed which was completed by club members in June 1953. Bulimba Sailing Club volunteers built its clubhouse in 1953 and raised the building later to accommodate boat storage. South Brisbane Sailing Club was given a lease in Orleigh Park, and the clubhouse was built by volunteer labour in 1956. Darling Point was built by club members in 1958.

Only six of the eleven post-war clubhouses remain: Oxley, South Brisbane, Darling Point (relocated to Manly Breakwater in 1978), Sandgate, Bulimba and Port Curtis. It appears that Port Curtis Sailing Club is the only extant clubhouse from the 1940s and 1950s to have used an architect in its design. Architect Phil Hanman, who designed the upper floor, had served with club vice president Doug Patrick in the Middle East during World War Two.

At Gladstone, the Harbour Board continued to reclaim land and in February 1967 the boundaries of R.301 (which included the sailing club site) were amended to reflect this reclamation. On 14 December 1967, R.301 was cancelled and Portion 119 was vested with the Gladstone Harbour Board. The sailing club then negotiated with the Gladstone Harbour Board for a lease on the clubhouse site for up to 75 years.

To gain a liquor licence during the mid 1970s an association was formed between the sailing club, the Port Curtis Air Sea Rescue, and the Gladstone Power Boat Club, to create the Gladstone Yacht Club as an entity. The air sea rescue and boating club are no longer associated with the yacht club which is now the trading name for the Port Curtis Sailing Club Inc.

The Port Curtis Sailing Club installed a pontoon sometime in the 1980s. In the 1990s the clubhouse was extended and upgraded including the addition of an open veranda on the north-east side, an extension on the north-west, and a new licensed bar area in part of the original ball room facing Auckland Creek, which was opened up with a glass front. A large verandah was added to the western side which included a restaurant. The project was designed by architect Allan Jeffery who assured the club that the original 1950s building would last for many more years and was a credit to the local volunteer builders. These new extensions were formally opened on 13 September 1997.

The Port Curtis Sailing Club has been proactive in organising a number of significant sailing activities and events in Queensland. In 1960 the club commenced "learn to sail" classes for local children and in 1961 it purchased ten sabots and initiated the South Queensland Sabot Association. It then negotiated with the Gladstone State High School to run the first sailing classes in Queensland High Schools. The Port Curtis Sailing Club provided the boats and the expertise. 1961 was also the year of the first Harbour Festival which was organised by the club to entertain spectators waiting for the yachts to arrive in the Brisbane to Gladstone race. The festival continues to be an annual event, though now organised through the local council. The club has also organised a wide range of ocean racing events including the Gladstone to Bowen, Gladstone to Bundaberg, Gladstone to Cairns, Gladstone to Great Keppel and Gladstone to Hamilton Island. Another first was claimed by club member Lesley Barker who was sailing mistress for the first all girl crew in the Sydney to Hobart Yacht Race in 1975. Club stalwart and foundation member Noel Patrick won the Brisbane to Gladstone on five occasions in his boat Wistari. He also published the first sailing directory for the Port Curtis region Cruising the Curtis Coast in 1986.

The Port Curtis Sailing Club has always been part of the organisational team involved in managing the finish of the Brisbane to Gladstone Yacht Race. Other organisations involved include the Gladstone Volunteer Marine Rescue, Gladstone Harbour Festival Committee, Gladstone Port Corporation, Gladstone Marina, Gladstone Mayor's office and interested local citizens. While the formal trophy presentations have been held at various locations over the 60 year history of the race, including the Town Hall, O'Connell Wharf and the clubhouse, the social activities have always occurred at the Port Curtis Sailing Club. The Club is open 24 hours a day during the Easter weekend in order to welcome sailing crews as they arrive. A plotting room is set up in the sail training room on the ground floor providing public access to the progress of the race. Electronic monitoring is managed at the adjacent Volunteer Marine Rescue headquarters.

In November 2008 the Brisbane to Gladstone Yacht Race was awarded the first prize in the "festival and events" category at the Queensland Tourism Awards. The race now generates festivals in Redcliffe (Festival of Sails) and Gladstone (Harbour Festival) and is recognised as a significant ocean racing event in Australia, second only to the Sydney to Hobart race. For race participants, it is known as "the friendly race", and the camaraderie amongst participants is what draws competitors back annually. The clubhouse was also awarded the Best Small Social Club in 2007 and 2008 in the Clubs Queensland Achievement Awards. The importance of the clubhouse to the race was summed up in 1983 by the Commodore, Julian Walker, who commented prior to the race: "Port Curtis Sailing Club is gearing up to make you feel welcome and give you an atmosphere in which to swap yarns and tall stories."

== Description ==
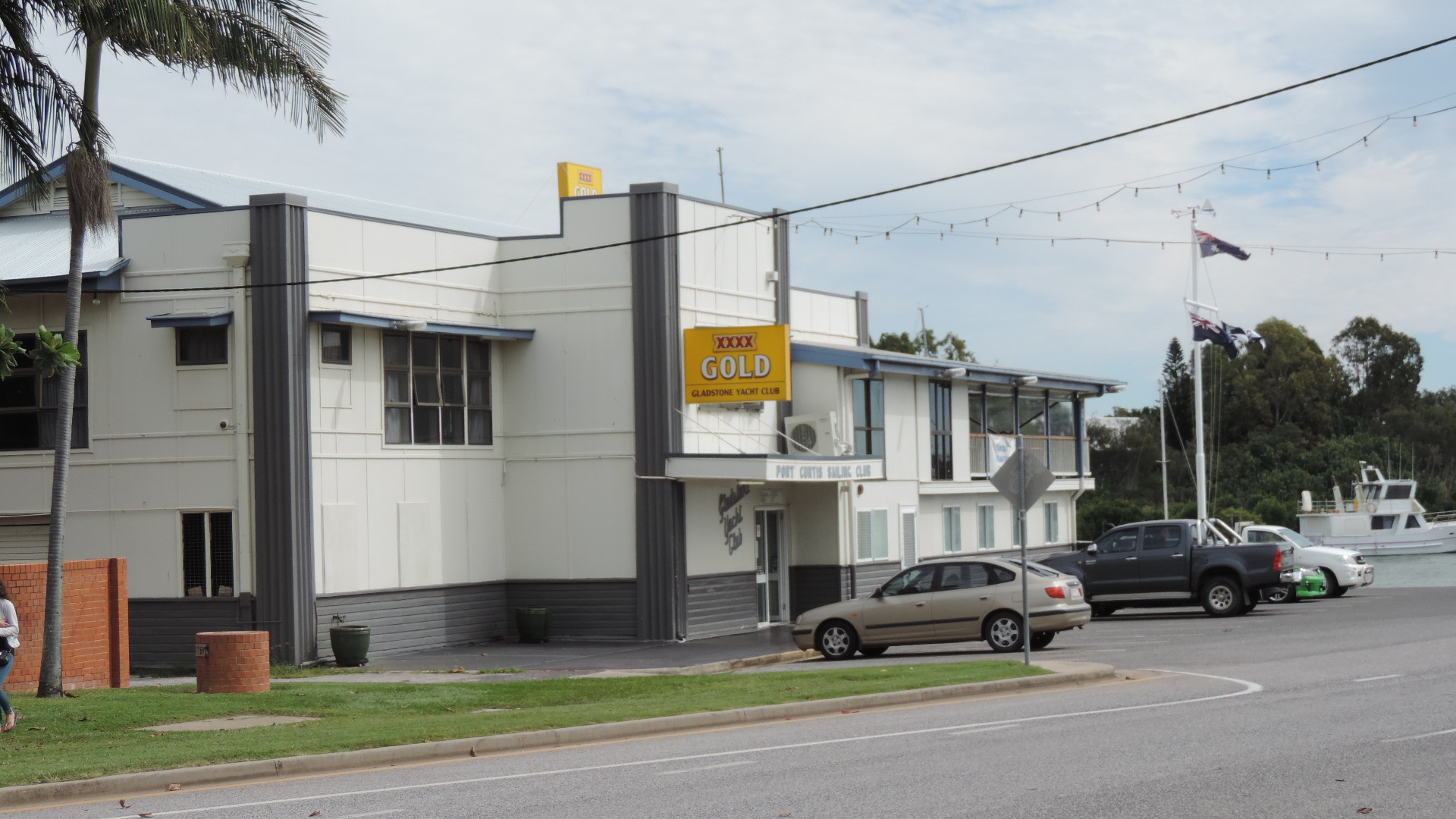
Clubhouse seen from Goondoon Street, 2014

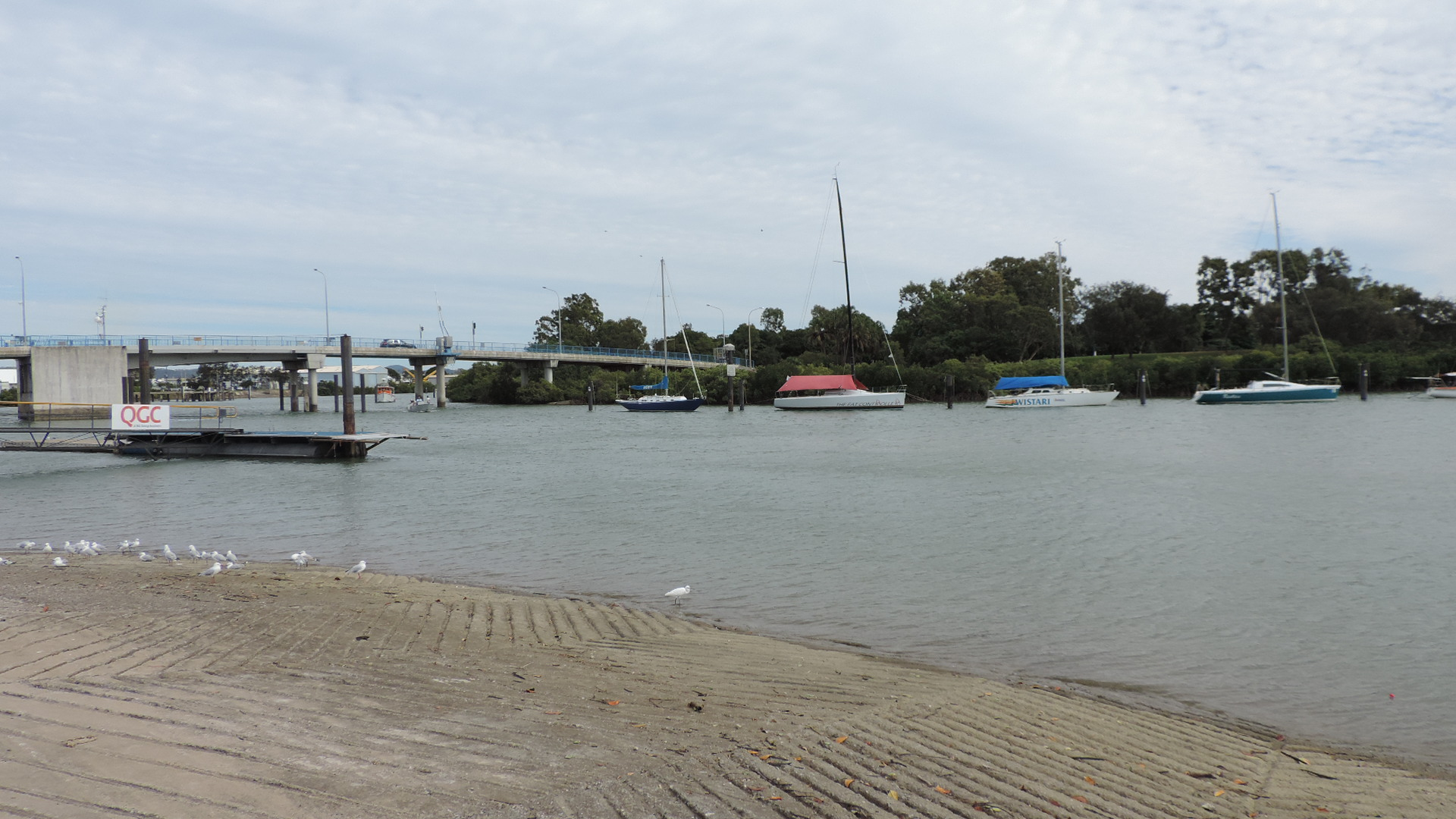
Auckland Inlet, opposite Port Curtis Sailing Club, 2014

The Port Curtis Sailing Club Clubhouse marks the northern end of Goondoon Street, Gladstone's main street, where the land slopes towards Gladstone Harbour. It forms part of a series of maritime structures at the mouth of Auckland Inlet including the Port Authority boat ramp, the O'Connell Wharf to the north, the Volunteer Marine Rescue Gladstone building and a recently constructed Customs building. It is located on largely flat ground overlooking the boat ramp towards the harbour.

The Port Curtis Sailing Club Clubhouse is a timber-framed structure which has been altered and extended since its completion in 1959. The 1950s structure forms the core of the existing building and various extensions have taken place around its perimeter. The building has a large hipped roof clad with galvanised metal sheeting with the main ridge finishing at gablets at either end. At the north-western end the hipped roof extends lower to form a balcony space. A two storey section has been added along the main north-eastern elevation. On the opposite side of the building a large deck with a curved roof clad with corrugated metal sheeting has been added. A two-storeyed kitchen wing has also been added behind the new deck space.

The main elevation, which faces to the north-east, features a protruding entry area and a parapet wall which extends for most of the length of the building. These are formed from timber sheeting. Narrow lengths of corrugated metal sheeting have been fixed to form column- like details within the parapet wall, framing each end and the entry area. The exterior is clad with chamferboards at the base with fibre- cement sheeting with timber cover strips to the remainder. A cantilevered street awning is located above the entry area with "Port Curtis Sailing Club" in lettering fixed along its front edge and "Gladstone Yacht Club" in lettering adjacent to the entry door. Narrow window hoods cover each of the window bays. Timber casement windows are located above the street awning. A verandah space on the upper level has exposed steel posts and balustrades with a small enclosed area clad with fibre-cement sheeting. Recent aluminium windows are located adjacent to the entry on the second level and on the lower level.

On the north-west elevation which overlooks the boat ramp and Auckland Inlet is a recently added enclosed balcony space supported on cantilevered tapered steel beams. The balcony is roofed with a skillion roof which extends from the hipped main roof and is enclosed with fixed and sliding glass panels. Adjacent to the balcony space is a recent outdoor dining area with a steel framed curved roof. The undercroft area below the outdoor dining area is open.

The lower level of the building is enclosed with fibre cement sheeting with chamferboards at the base. Openings are varied throughout the building and include metal roller-doors, aluminium framed sliding and hopper windows, louvre windows. A recent kitchen extension has been added to the rear south-western corner of the building which has a hipped roof and is clad with fibre cement on the upper floor and enclosed with blockwork on the lower level.

The building consists of various dining and bar areas on the upper floor with storage for boats and catering equipment on the lower level. The two levels are linked by an early stairwell which remains largely intact and is reached from a small foyer/entry area adjacent to the main entry. A new office has been constructed in the foyer area. The upper floor has been divided into a central lounge bar, balcony dining area and function room. The verandah space to the north-east has been enclosed to form a games room. A new outdoor dining area is located behind the lounge bar to the west.

The lower floor of the building is largely open for storage with early timber stumps visible. A training room has been enclosed in the north- east corner and a catering storage area formed by blockwork in the southern corner.

The upper floor has walls lined with vertically fixed painted chamferboards and plasterboard sheeting. The ceiling is lined with plasterboard with some recessed ceiling panels visible. Floors are lined with recent linoleum strip sheeting with carpet in some areas. The internal stairwell has walls lined with long lengths of chamferboards and fibre cement sheeting with cover strips. The staircase has treads and risers of polished timber and balustrades with timber cappings. The balcony space has walls and ceilings lined with plasterboard. On the lower floor walls and ceilings are generally unlined with some early louvre windows visible which are hidden behind cladding on the outside.

The grounds include lawned boat-rigging areas adjacent to the concrete boat ramp to the north of the clubhouse and bitumened carparks in front of the building (fronting Goondoon Street) and at its rear to the west. A white, painted steel flagpole is located to the north. There is a recent pontoon extending into Auckland Inlet, but this sits outside the heritage boundary.

== Heritage listing ==
Port Curtis Sailing Club Clubhouse was listed on the Queensland Heritage Register on 26 June 2009 having satisfied the following criteria.

The place is important in demonstrating the evolution or pattern of Queensland's history.

The Port Curtis Sailing Club Clubhouse, constructed between 1949 and 1959 on Auckland Inlet at Gladstone, is important in illustrating part of the pattern of Queensland's history, namely the development of the sport of sailing in Queensland.

The place is important for its close association with the annual Easter-weekend Brisbane to Gladstone Yacht Race, inaugurated in 1949 and second only to the Sydney to Hobart Yacht Race in terms of significance in Australian ocean racing. The race was awarded first prize in the "festival and events" category at the Queensland Tourism Awards in 2008. The Port Curtis Sailing Club has played an integral role in the management of the race since its inception, and its clubhouse remains an iconic venue for end-of-the-race celebrations by participants, organisers and spectators alike. A plotting room set up in the sail training room on the ground floor of the clubhouse provides public access to the progress of the race, and the clubhouse has been the venue for the presentation of race trophies.

The Club also has been credited with initiating the South Queensland Sabot Association and being the first in Queensland to offer sail training as a high school subject, activities that were based at the clubhouse.

The clubhouse remains one of the earlier sailing club facilities on the Queensland coast. The 1950s core of the clubhouse survives, with undercroft boat storage and sail training room, and a former dance hall on the upper level.

The place has a strong or special association with a particular community or cultural group for social, cultural or spiritual reasons.

The Port Curtis Sailing Club Clubhouse is significant for its special association with the Australian sailing community as the principal venue for the celebration of the end of the annual Brisbane to Gladstone Yacht Race, and as a past venue for the presentation of race trophies.
