= Curtis Island, Queensland =

Curtis Island
- Suburb
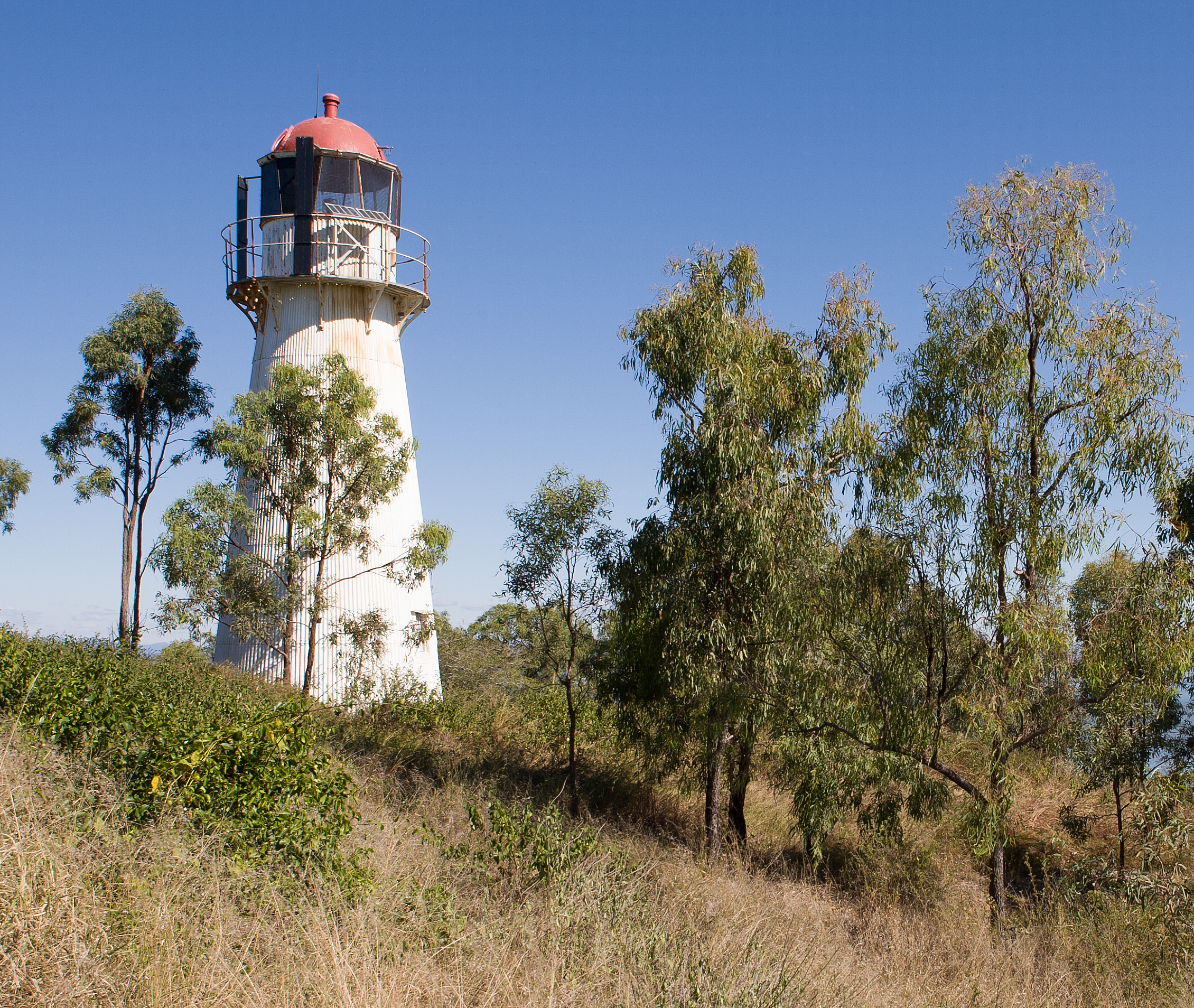
- Sea Hill Lighthouse, Curtis Island, 2011

- Interactive map of Curtis Island
- Coordinates: 23.6169°S 151.1530°E
- Country: Australia
- State: Queensland
- LGA: Gladstone Region

Government
  - State electorate: Gladstone
  - Federal division: Flynn

Area
  - Total: 675.9 km^{2} (261.0 sq mi)
- Elevation: 20 m (66 ft)

Population
  - Total: 36 (2021 census)
  - Density: 0.0533/km^{2} (0.1379/sq mi)
- Postcode: 4680
- Mean max temp: 24.9 °C (76.8 °F)
- Mean min temp: 21.0 °C (69.8 °F)
Suburbs around Curtis Island
Coral Sea	Coral Sea	Coral Sea
The Narrows	Curtis Island	Coral Sea
Targinnie	Callemondah; Yarwun	Gladstone Harbour

Curtis Island is an offshore locality in the Gladstone Region, Queensland, Australia. The towns of Beachton and Southend are within the locality. In the 2021 census, Curtis Island had a population of 36 people.

== Geography ==
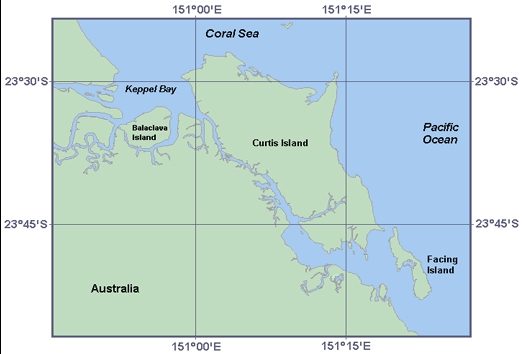
Curtis Island map

Curtis Island occupies almost all of the island from which it takes its name, except for a very small area in the south of the island which is included in the locality of Gladstone Harbour. Most of the island is protected from development: most of the ocean-facing eastern side of the island is within either the Curtis Island National Park or the Curtis Island Conservation Park, while most of the mainland-facing western side of the island is within the Curtis Island State Forest.

The town Beachton is on the northern-western coast of the island (23.489°S 150.979°E) Beachton has some housing along the beachfront but many of its blocks of land are undeveloped.

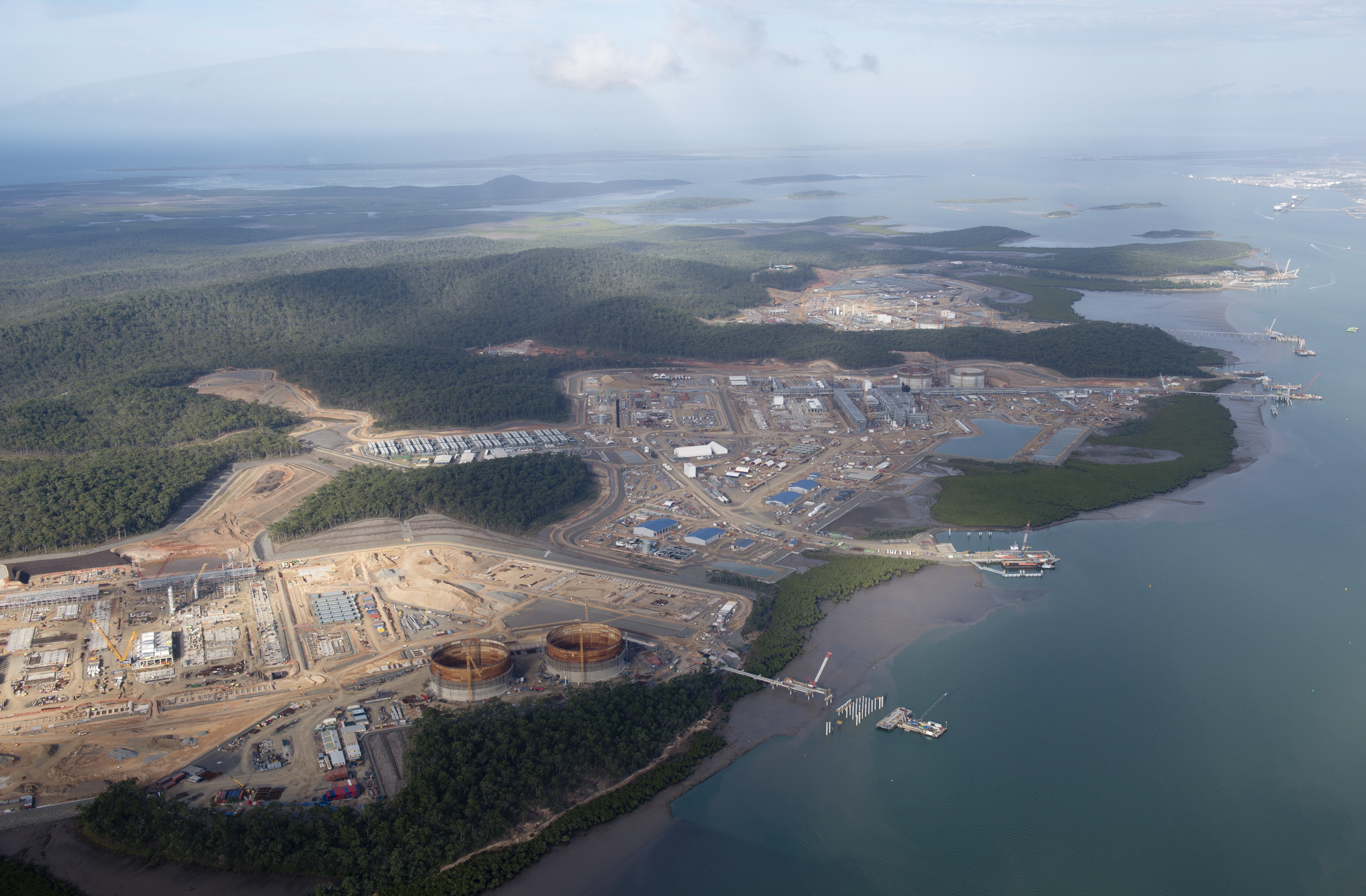
Natural gas facilities, 2013

On the south western coast there is an industrial area consisting of three liquid natural gas facilities (23.7650°S 151.1980°E) with port facilities for export.

On the south-eastern coast there is the small town of Southend (23.7566°S 151.3105°E) on a peninsula at the confluence of Gladstone Harbour and the Coral Sea. Most of the town lots in Southend are developed.

The waterway between the mainland and Curtis Island is known as The Narrows. It is a 27 kilometres (17 mi) long narrow strait. It connects Gladstone Harbour to Keppel Bay (the mouth of the Fitzroy River). However, it is very shallow and in some places it can be crossed at low tide. It is mainly used for recreational activities, including fishing.

There are two lighthouses on the island:

- Cape Capricorn Light on Cape Capricorn (23.48651°S 151.23654°E)
- Sea Hill Light at The Narrows through which Keppel Bay connects to the Gladstone Harbour (23.49121°S 150.9802°E)

=== Headlands ===
Curtis Island has the following headlands (from north to south):

- Cape Keppel (23.4475°S 151.0557°E)
- Station Point (23.4533°S 151.0173°E)
- Warners Point (23.4787°S 150.9902°E)
- Cape Capricorn (23.4832°S 151.2335°E)
- Sea Hill Point (23.4916°S 150.9778°E)
- Dinkys Point (23.4937°S 150.9805°E)
- Black Head (23.6620°S 151.2676°E)
- Laird Point (23.7442°S 151.1728°E)
- Boatshed Point (23.7945°S 151.2325°E)
- Hamilton Point (23.7989°S 151.2228°E)

=== Mountains ===
Curtis Island has the following mountains (from north to south):

- Bald Hill (23.4575°S 151.0602°E) 99 metres (325 ft)
- Grassy Hill (23.4653°S 151.0261°E)
- One Mile Hill (23.4698°S 151.0146°E)
- Sea Hill (23.4873°S 150.9957°E) 84 metres (276 ft)
- Coast Hill (23.5033°S 151.1003°E) 124 metres (407 ft)
- Mount Barker (23.5279°S 151.0718°E) 161 metres (528 ft)
- Mount Barney (23.5536°S 151.1498°E) 85 metres (279 ft)
- Sandhill (23.6194°S 151.2296°E) 69 metres (226 ft)
- Central Hill (23.6462°S 151.1114°E) 86 metres (282 ft)
- Black Head (23.6690°S 151.2746°E) 57 metres (187 ft)
- Ship Hill (23.7683°S 151.2183°E) 173 metres (568 ft)

=== Climate ===
Curtis Island has a tropical savanna climate bordering on a humid subtropical climate (Köppen: Aw/Cfa) with hot, wet summers and warm, dry winters. Extreme temperatures ranged from 35.4 °C (95.7 °F) on 16 November 2005 to 9.9 °C (49.8 °F) on 22 June 2007.

Climate data was sourced from the nearest weather station at Rundle Island.

Climate data for Curtis Island (Rundle Island) (23.53°S 151.28°E) (20 m (66 ft) AMSL) (1994-2025)
Month	Jan	Feb	Mar	Apr	May	Jun	Jul	Aug	Sep	Oct	Nov	Dec	Year
Record high °C (°F)	33.0 (91.4)	33.0 (91.4)	32.1 (89.8)	33.0 (91.4)	28.4 (83.1)	27.0 (80.6)	26.6 (79.9)	26.5 (79.7)	29.1 (84.4)	30.0 (86.0)	35.4 (95.7)	34.0 (93.2)	35.4 (95.7)
Mean daily maximum °C (°F)	28.3 (82.9)	28.2 (82.8)	27.5 (81.5)	25.7 (78.3)	23.5 (74.3)	21.5 (70.7)	20.7 (69.3)	21.3 (70.3)	23.1 (73.6)	24.9 (76.8)	26.4 (79.5)	27.7 (81.9)	24.9 (76.8)
Mean daily minimum °C (°F)	24.5 (76.1)	24.5 (76.1)	23.8 (74.8)	21.9 (71.4)	19.4 (66.9)	17.1 (62.8)	16.1 (61.0)	17.0 (62.6)	19.3 (66.7)	21.2 (70.2)	22.6 (72.7)	24.0 (75.2)	21.0 (69.7)
Record low °C (°F)	19.0 (66.2)	19.9 (67.8)	18.6 (65.5)	14.3 (57.7)	11.4 (52.5)	9.0 (48.2)	10.1 (50.2)	10.0 (50.0)	12.9 (55.2)	15.0 (59.0)	17.4 (63.3)	17.8 (64.0)	9.0 (48.2)
Source: Bureau of Meteorology (1994-2025)

== History ==
Cape Capricorn was named by Captain Cook when he passed on 25 May 1770, since he found it to be located on the Tropic of Capricorn (which was located at 23°28′15″ in 1770). The modern surveyed location of its endpoint is just slightly south of the present tropic.

The locality takes its name from the island, which in turn was named after Port Curtis, which was named by Matthew Flinders on 1 August 1802, after Vice Admiral Sir Roger Curtis, a commanding British Admiral at Cape Town who had assisted Flinders with repairs to HMS Investigator in October 1801. Port Curtis was the original name for the Gladstone area.

The Canoona gold rush in 1858 attracted many people to the Rockhampton area. However, many ships encountered difficulties negotiating the many sand bars at the entrance to the Fitzroy River, so a pilot station was requested in 1862. The first pilot station is believed to have been established at Cape Capricorn but later was moved to Grassy Hill (23.4656°S 151.0261°E) in 1864.

In 1865, Sea Hill (23.48694°S 150.99528°E) was chosen as the site for a quarantine station for ships entering the Fitzroy River, but no quarantine station was constructed there until July 1873 when the ship Countess Russell arrived with 15 cases of typhoid fever on board, resulting in a temporary hospital being established. Those who died were buried in the Keppel Bay Cemetery (to the north-west of the present lighthouse). Over 500 Chinese people were quarantined at Sea Hill due to a smallpox outbreak in 1877. In 1878, the problems with mosquitoes and sandflies resulted in the quarantine station being relocated to Mackenzie Island (23.51083°S 150.86417°E).

A lighthouse to guide ships into the Fitzroy river was requested in 1864, but it was not until the early-1870s that the first Sea Hill lighthouse was constructed. The first Cape Carpricorn Lighthouse was built in 1874.

The Monte Cristo pastoral station was established in the 1860s by John Bonar Peter Hamilton Ramsay (nicknamed ‘Alphabetical’ Ramsay due to the number of his Christian names) and two partners. They raised cattle and bred horses. They took advantage of the shallowness of the Narrows to cross their animals to the mainland at low tide at a point that became known as Ramsay's Crossing. This practice continued until 2014 when the pastoral station was sold to be developed as a gas plant.

A coastal steamer also travelled between Gladstone and Rockhampton via The Narrows but this could only be done at high tide.

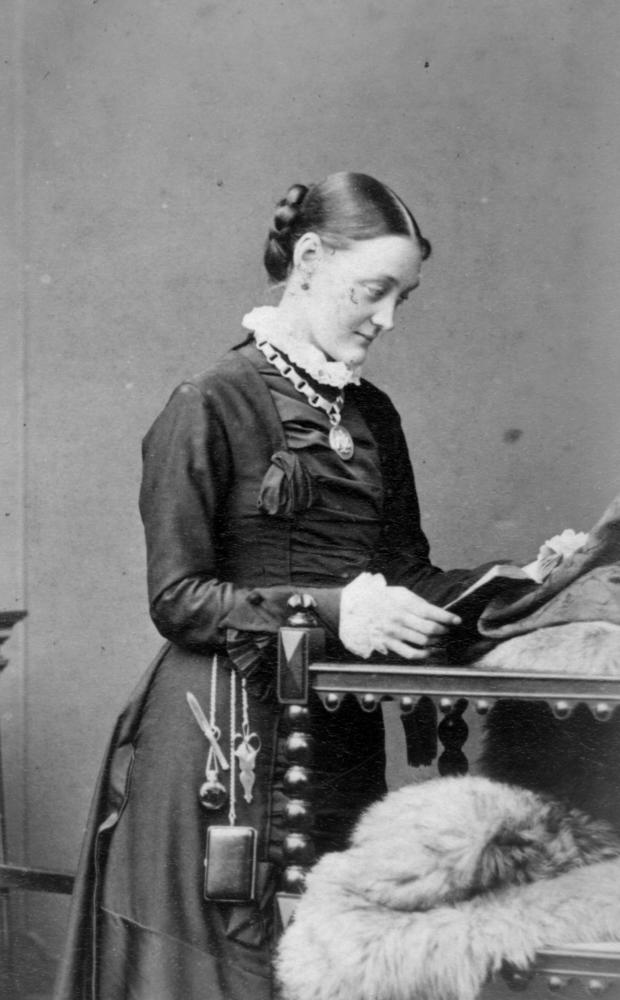
Rosa Praed

Author Rosa Campbell Praed lived on Curtis Island. On 29 October 1872 she married Arthur Campbell Praed, a nephew of the poet Winthrop Mackworth Praed. She described living with him on his property on Curtis Island, "an existence of terrifying hardship and loneliness". Spender says that "The years which she spent on Curtis Island and which played such a crucial part in determining her values – and her voice – could hardly be described as middle-class, indulgent or privileged". She recreates her life at this time in her novel, An Australian Heroine (1880). It was also during her time on Curtis Island that she turned to spiritualism.

The Town of Southend first appears on the 1922 survey plan S7341. In February 1923, the first 20 blocks of land were offered as 15-year leases.

In 1964, it was proposed to relocate the population of the island of Nauru to Curtis Island. By that time, Nauru had been extensively mined for phosphate by companies from Australia, Britain and New Zealand damaging the landscape so much that it was thought the island would be uninhabitable by the 1990s. Rehabilitating the island was seen as financially impossible. In 1962, Prime Minister of Australia, Robert Menzies, said that the three countries involved in the mining had an obligation to provide a solution for the Nauruan people, and proposed finding a new island for them. In 1963, the Australian Government proposed to acquire all the land on Curtis Island (which was considerably larger than Nauru) and then offer the Nauruans freehold title over the island and that the Nauruans would become Australian citizens. The costs of resettling the Nauruans on Curtis Island was estimated to be £10 million, which included housing and infrastructure and the establishment of pastoral, agricultural, and fishing industries. However, the Nauruan people did not wish to become Australian citizens and wanted to be given sovereignty over Curtis Island in order to establish themselves as an independent nation, which Australia would not agree to. Nauru rejected the proposal to move to Curtis Island, instead choosing to become an independent nation (a process completed in 1968) operating their own mines in Nauru (acquired in 1967).

== Demographics ==
In the 2016 census, Curtis Island had a population of 323 people.

In the 2021 census, Curtis Island had a population of 36 people.

== Heritage listings ==
Curtis Island has a number of heritage-listed sites, including:

- Cape Capricorn Light, north-eastern tip of Curtis Island
- Sea Hill Light, Sea Hill Point

== Education ==
There are no schools on or nearby Curtis Island. The options are distance education and boarding school.

== Transport ==
There are no bridges to Curtis Island. As at April 2019, a vehicular and passenger ferry runs services from Gladstone to Southend via Farmers Point on Facing Island on 5 days of the week.

== Endangered bird ==
Curtis island is home to the Capricorn yellow chat (Epthianura crocea macgregori), a tiny bird which is considered critically endangered under the Environment Protection and Biodiversity Conservation Act 1999. As of 2020, the bird is threatened by rising sea levels on Curtis Island. It is only found on three plains on the central Queensland coast, and since 2002 the sea level along that coast has risen 80 millimetres (3.1 in). The population was reduced to just a couple of pairs 20 years ago, but now there are almost 40 on Curtis Island. This increase is attributed to a feral pig culling program from 2006 and the removal of cattle in about 2016. The chat has been moving inland, but closer to the trees, they are more likely to be prey for birds like sparrow hawks. Central Queensland University researcher Bob Black has been studying the bird for 20 years.
