= Shorncliffe pier =

Historic pier in Brisbane, Australia

Coordinates: 27.3219°S 153.0857°E

Shorncliffe Pier
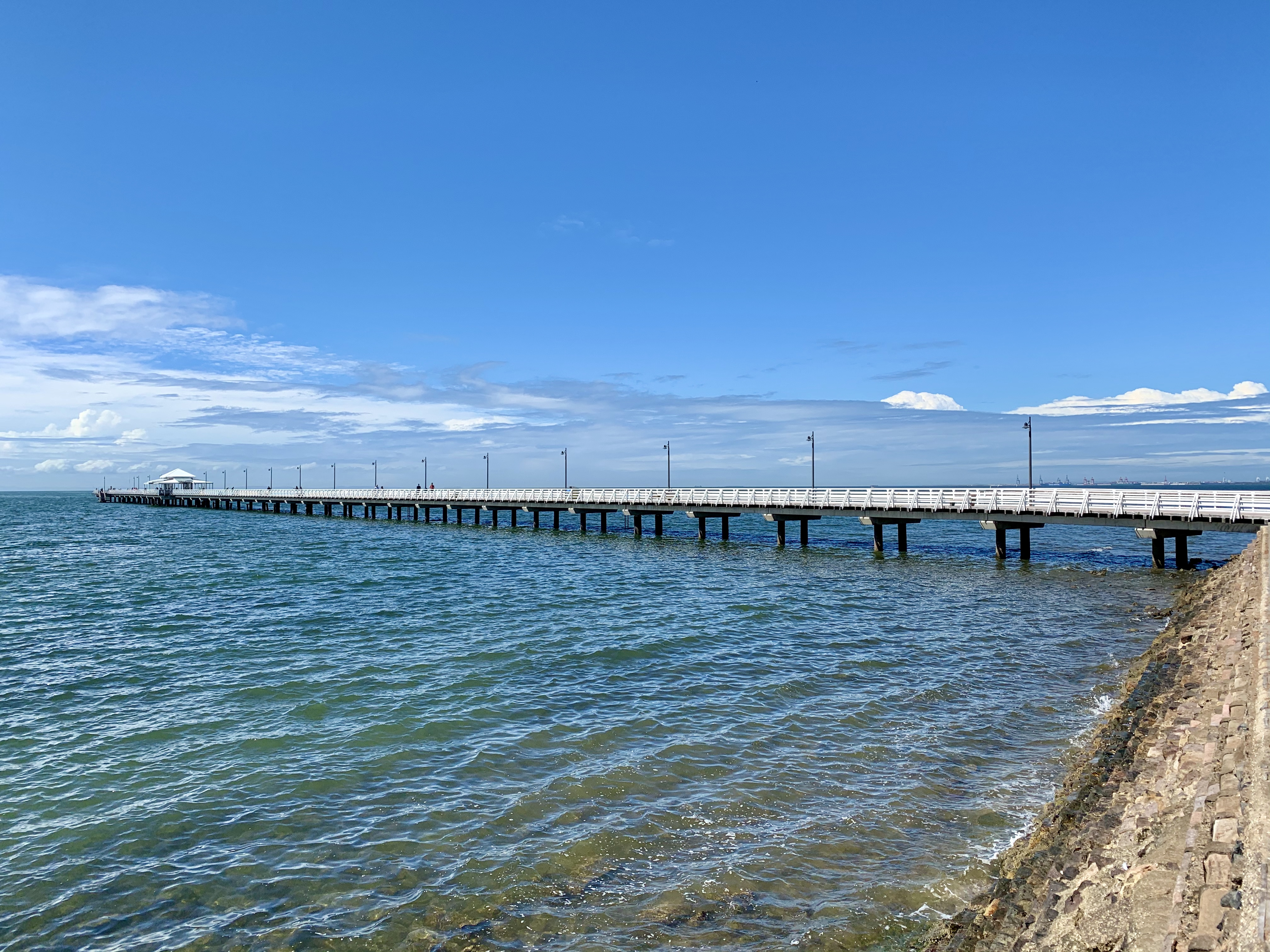
- Type: Fishing Pier
- Carries: Pedestrians
- Spans: Bramble Bay
- Location: Shorncliffe, Queensland, Australia

Characteristics
- Total length: 351.5 metres (1,153 ft)
- Width: 5.5 metres (18 ft)
- Clearance below: March 2016

History
- Designer: Pier
- Construction start: 1882
- Completion date: 1884
- Opening date: 1884-2012
- Closure date: 2014

Shorncliffe Pier is a historic pier in Shorncliffe, Brisbane, Queensland, Australia, situated near Saint Patrick's College and lower Moora Park. The pier with its white faded timber railings, colonial street lamps spaced out along the stretch of pier, and resting shelter towards the end was a much visited attraction for families, residents and tourists to the area. Reaching 351.5 metres (1,153 ft) out into Bramble Bay (part of Moreton Bay) it is the largest timber pier in Brisbane and one of the longest recreational piers in Australia. The renewed pier was reopened to the public in March 2016.

== History ==
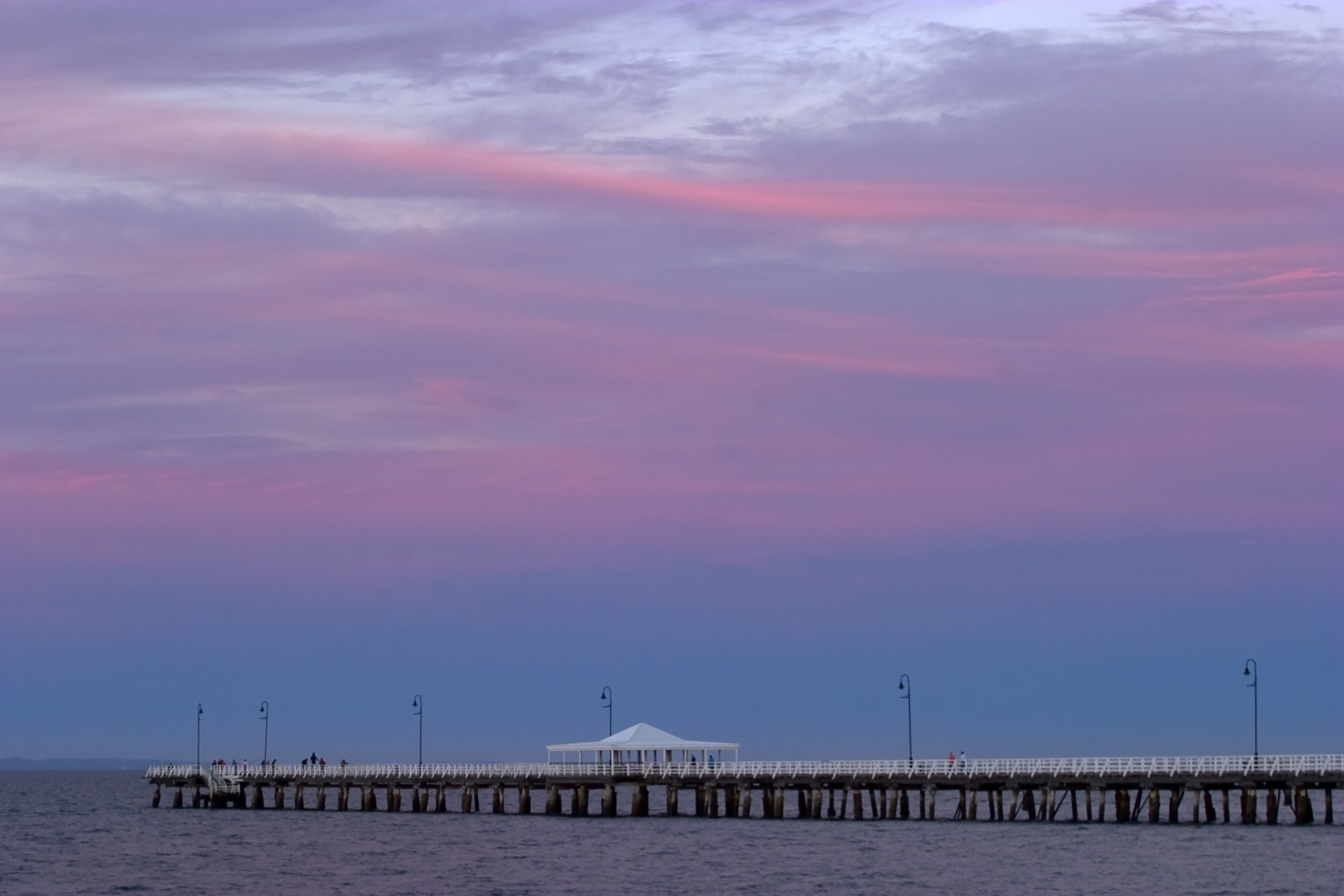
Original Shorncliffe pier prior to renewal

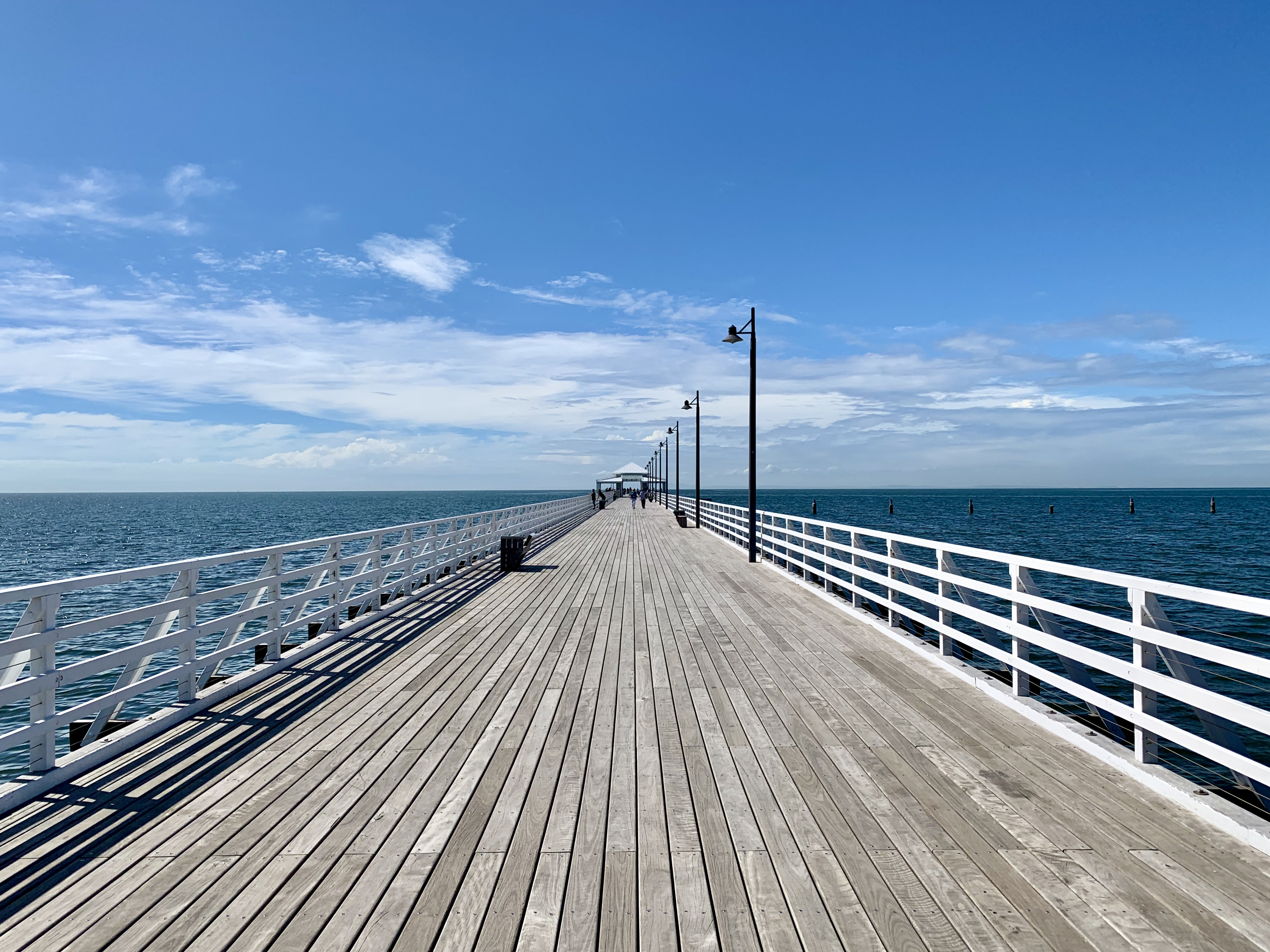
Current pier following renewal

During the early history of Shorncliffe and its neighbouring bayside suburb Sandgate, both were beachside suburbs visited by Brisbane residents for day trips and holidays. In 1865, a company was formed to construct the pier aiming to increase connections between Brisbane and Sandgate. Lobbying efforts to persuade the Queensland Government to build a pier failed. William Deagon, a local hotel proprietor choose to build a jetty opposite his hotel in 1879. It was smaller than the current pier but still had a tram track.

The existing jetty was deemed inadequate and new company was registered in 1882 which built a new pier between 1883 and 1884. It was designed by FDG Stanley and the builder was John Watson. It was originally 260 metres (850 ft) long but this extended by another 91.5 metres (300 ft) to allow ferries to dock at low tide. A small toll was collected at the entry to the pier. Ferry services had mixed commercial success. The last ferry to Brisbane ran in 1928. At that time the pier housed an amusement parlour including gaming machines and an open air picture theatre.

In the 1950s, Queensland's first women lifesavers, the Sandgate Ladies Life Saving Club, used bathing sheds at the pier.

The pier is the start of the Brisbane to Gladstone yacht race in April and is an element in many photographs and pieces of art circulating in Brisbane art galleries. With views of Redcliffe peninsula, the Boondall Wetlands, Moreton Bay Islands and the Shorncliffe cliffs, the pier is a feature in the nautical landscape of this northside Brisbane suburb.

In late 2000 the pier was refurbished and repainted. The boardwalk leading to the pier and the adjoining parks underwent large scale renovations in 2008 as part of a Brisbane City Council project aimed at attracting tourists to the area and reclaiming its bayside suburb character.

In 2011, Sandgate Pier was used as the location for a UK TV commercial for Homebase DIY. The Pier was given a temporary makeover for the commercial.

In early 2012, the pier was closed due to its poor condition caused by marine borers. An engineers' report confirmed that the pier needed to be removed. In March 2012 Brisbane City Lord Mayor Graham Quirk stated he wanted to renew the pier.

== Pier renewal ==
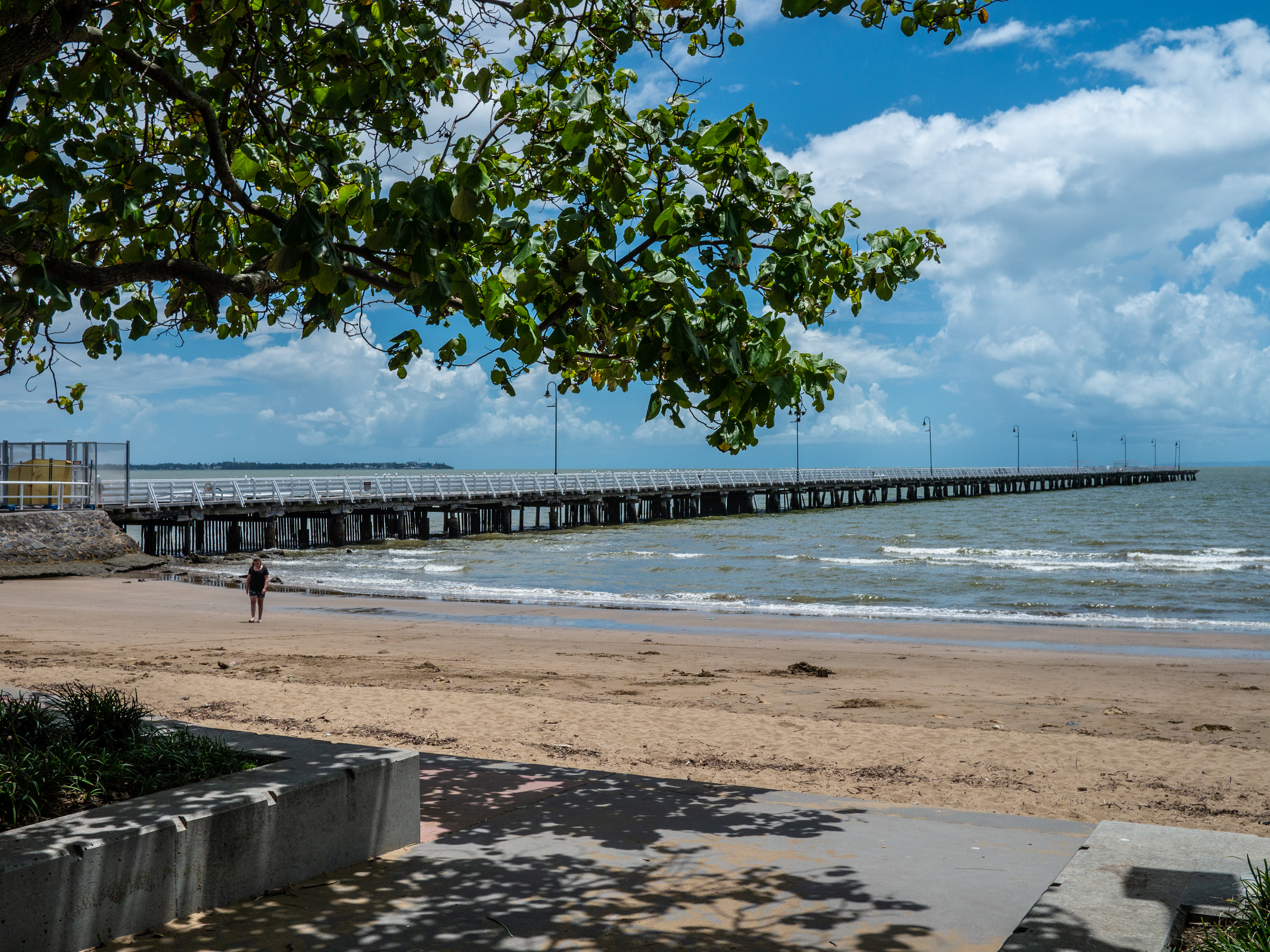
Shorncliffe pier from Moora Park Beach

In May 2012 the Brisbane City Council was announced that the pier would be renewed. The design of the renewed pier was released in mid-2013. The new structure will be the same length, the same width and on the same alignment as the existing pier. The renewed pier design includes concrete and steel substructure and timber joists, decking, handrails and rotunda. There will also be a larger hammerhead and a lower platform at the end of the pier, fish cleaning stations, water fountains, benches and light poles.

The pier removal works commenced in November 2014. The new Shorncliffe Pier was opened to the public on Good Friday, 25 March 2016.

== See also ==
- List of piers
