= Broadhurst =

Broadhurst may refer to:

- Broadhurst (name), a surname
- Broadhurst (Gaborone), a neighborhood in Gaborone, Botswana
- Broadhurst Gardens, a street in London, England
- Broadhurst Park, a football stadium in Manchester, England
- Broadhurst, Sandgate, a heritage-listed house in Sandgate, Queensland, Australia
- Broadhurst Theatre (est. 1917), a Broadway theatre in New York City
