= Sandgate =

Sandgate may refer to:

In Australia

- Sandgate, Randwick, a heritage-listed house in Randwick, New South Wales
- Sandgate, New South Wales, Australia
- Sandgate, Queensland, Australia
  - Electoral district of Sandgate, Queensland, Australia
  - Sandgate Post Office
  - Sandgate railway station, Brisbane
  - Sandgate Town Hall

In the United Kingdom

- Sandgate, Kent, England
  - Sandgate Castle
- Sandgate, an area east of Newcastle upon Tyne, referenced in the song "The Keel Row"; see Newcastle upon Tyne#16th to 19th centuries

In the United States

- Sandgate, Vermont, USA
