= Broadhurst (surname) =

Broadhurst is a surname. Notable people with the surname include:

born in Australia

- Blake Broadhurst (born 1985), Australian rules footballer
- Edward Broadhurst (1810–1883), English-born Australian barrister and politician
- Florance Broadhurst (1861–1909), Australian businessman
- Florence Broadhurst (1899–1977), Australian designer and businesswoman whose murder remains unsolved

born in Canada

- Cecil Broadhurst (1903–1981), Canadian-American artist

born in Ireland

- Amy Broadhurst (born 1997), Irish amateur boxer

born in New Zealand

- James Broadhurst (born 1987), New Zealand rugby union player
- Mark Broadhurst (born c. 1956), New Zealand rugby league player
- Michael Broadhurst (born 1986), New Zealand rugby union player
- Phil Broadhurst (1949–2020), New Zealand composer and jazz pianist

born in the United Kingdom

- Bob Broadhurst, British police commander
- Brian Broadhurst (1938–2006), English footballer
- Charles Broadhurst, English footballer
- Charles Edward Broadhurst (1861–1909), English-Australian pioneer
- Don Broadhurst (born 1984), English boxer
- Sir Edward Tootal Broadhurst, 1st Baronet (1858–1922), British businessman
- Fred Broadhurst (1888–1953), English footballer
- George Broadhurst (1866–1952), English-American theatre manager and playwright
- Sir Harry Broadhurst (1905–1995), commander in the Royal Air Force
- Henry Broadhurst (1840–1911), British trade unionist and politician
- John Broadhurst (1778–1861), British politician
- Rt Revd Dr John Broadhurst (living), Bishop of Fulham in the Diocese of London, England
- Joanne Broadhurst (born 1967), English footballer
- Joe Broadhurst (1862–after 1888), English footballer
- Karl Broadhurst (born 1980), English footballer
- Kevan Broadhurst (born 1959), English footballer and football manager
- Mark Broadhurst (born 1974), English cricketer
- Mary Broadhurst (1860–1928), English suffragette
- Paul Broadhurst (born 1965), English golfer
- Penny Broadhurst (born 1980), British singer-songwriter
- Ronald Broadhurst (1906–1976), Northern Irish politician
- Susan Broadhurst, artist and academic

born in the United States

- Al Broadhurst (1927–2014), American speed skater
- Alex Broadhurst (born 1993), American ice hockey player
- Arthur Broadhurst (born 1964), American politician
- Jean Broadhurst (1873–1954), American scientist
- Kent Broadhurst (born 1940), American actor
- Max Broadhurst (1896–?), American football player
- Terry Broadhurst (born 1988), American ice hockey player
