= Sandgate War Memorial Park =

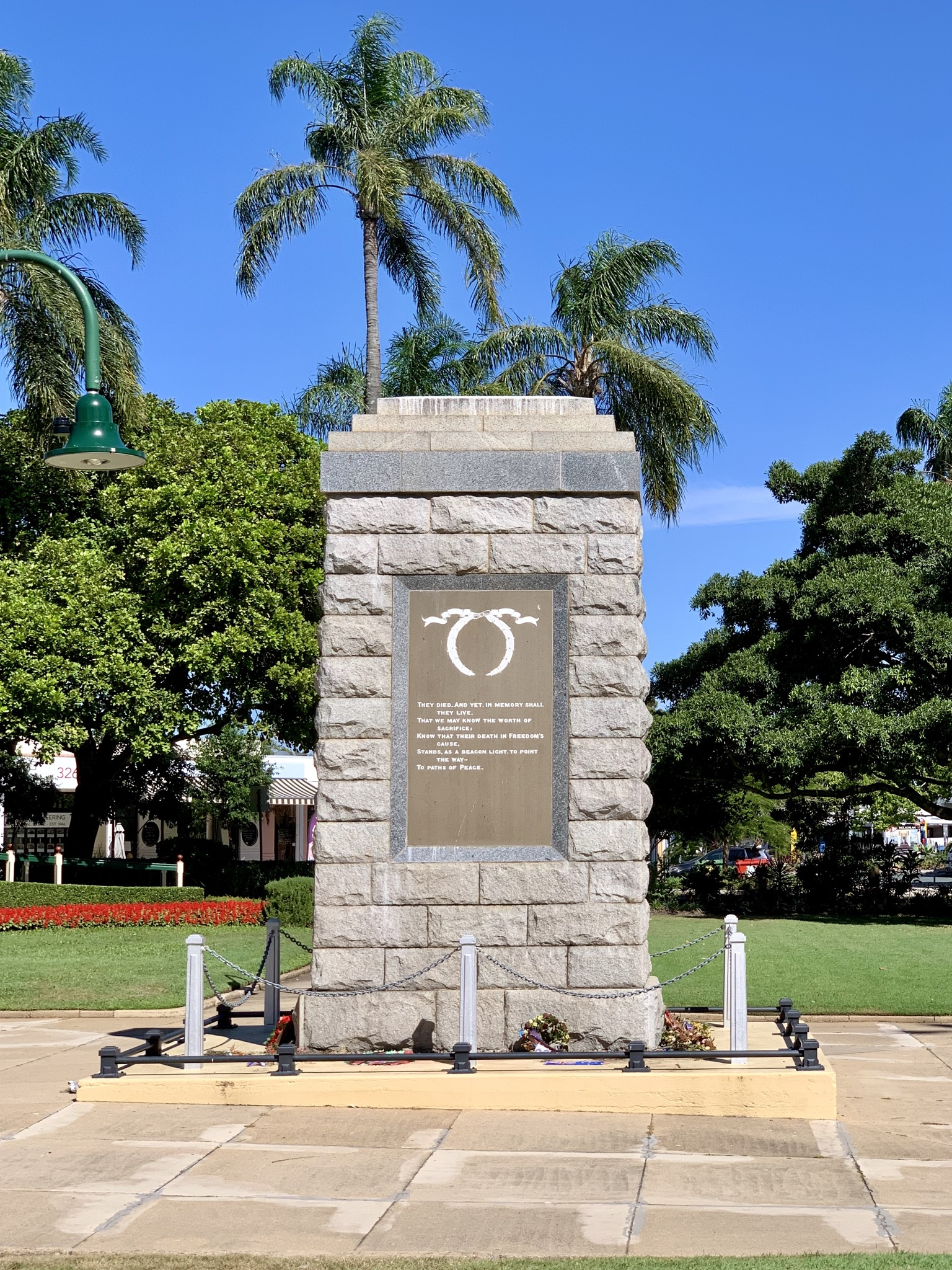
- Sandgate War Memorial Park

- Location within Queensland Location within Australia
- 27.3206°S 153.0698°E
- Location: 8 Seymour Street, Sandgate, City of Brisbane, Queensland, Australia

History
- Design period: 1919–1930s (interwar period)
- Built: 1923–1924

Site notes
- Architect: George Gray Prentice

Queensland Heritage Register
- Official name: Sandgate War Memorial Park
- Type: state heritage (built, landscape)
- Designated: 3 October 2005
- Reference no.: 602454
- Significant period: 1920s (fabric)
- Significant components: memorial surrounds/railings, trees/plantings, memorial – plaque, memorial – cenotaph, bollards, pathway/walkway, drinking fountain, garden – bed/s
- Builders: Lowther & Sons

Sandgate War Memorial Park is a heritage-listed memorial at 8 Seymour Street, Sandgate, City of Brisbane, Queensland, Australia. It was designed by George Gray Prentice and built from 1923 to 1924 by Lowther & Sons. It was added to the Queensland Heritage Register on 3 October 2005.

== History ==
Sandgate War Memorial Park is a triangular portion of land situated close to the Sandgate Town Hall. The war memorial located in the middle of the park was unveiled on 24 February 1924 to memorialize the men from Sandgate who had died while serving their country during World War I (1914–1918).

European settlement in the Sandgate district began in the 1850s. By the 1860s, the area was frequented by visitors from Brisbane for recreational purposes and after the opening of the rail to Sandgate in 1882 the area rapidly developed as a seaside resort. The Sandgate Post Office was erected near the Sandgate railway station in 1887, the Town of Sandgate was proclaimed in 1902 and a town hall erected in 1912. By the mid-twentieth century, increased use of cars meant that more distant seaside places became more accessible and the popularity of Sandgate as a seaside resort declined.

According to Brigadier James Cannan, in a speech given at the unveiling of the Sandgate monument, 330 soldiers from the township had enlisted for World War I. Of these, 51 were killed. The impact of the war Australia-wide was devastating with over 300, 000 volunteers from a national population of four million serving overseas and one fifth, approximately 60,000 dying. Virtually every community in every state was affected by the war in Europe and Asia Minor.

After the war, memorials honouring those who served were erected in nearly every city, town and community in Australia. The erection of memorials peaked during the period 1919 to 1925. Typically, a committee of patriotic citizens was formed which raised money by public subscription and public entertainments. Land on which to erect the memorial was usually provided by the local authority. Expenditure was often considerable for the size of communities and war memorials became a matter of local pride, an indication of a district's patriotism and wealth.

Construction of the Sandgate memorial was organized by a committee chaired by the Mayor of Sandgate (Alderman William Henry Bowser). The design was by prominent Queensland architect, George Gray Prentice, who was practicing at the time in partnership with Thomas Ramsay Hall as Hall & Prentice. The Brisbane newspapers reported that the memorial, composed of about 100 tons of granite and concrete, cost around £850. The granite blocks that made up most of the structure were donated by Alderman Bowser from his quarry at Samford and the top sills and the borders of the trachyte panels were of polished Victorian granite. At the unveiling, the Mayor noted that granite was used to "resist the seaside atmosphere". The front panel of the monument listed the names of the 51 Sandgate soldiers who had lost their lives during the war and the rear panel contained a verse composed by William Henry Lister, a member of the committee. The foundation stone was laid by the Queensland Governor, Sir Matthew Nathan, on 14 July 1923 and the completed memorial was unveiled by the Governor on 24 February 1924.

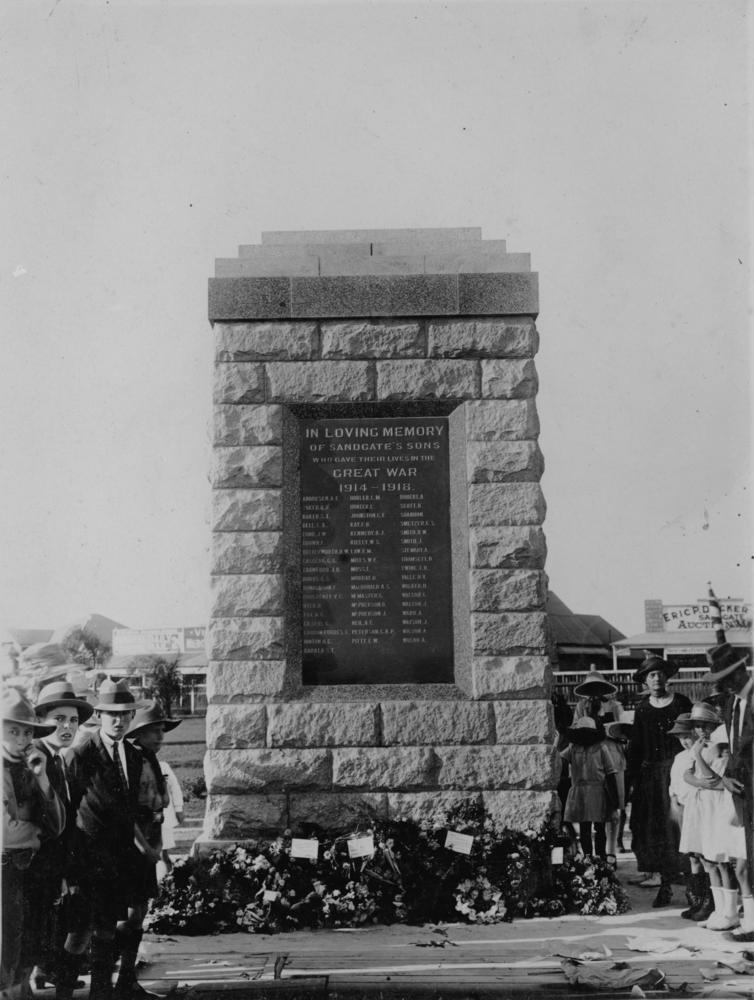
Wreath-laying ceremony at the Sandgate War Memorial, circa 1923

The monument was built by Messrs. Lowther and Sons. This was an early Brisbane masonry firm, established in the 1880s by John Lowther. The Lowthers became one of the largest suppliers of stone and marble in the southern hemisphere by the time of WWI. Charles Lowther served with the Australian Light Horse in Palestine during the war. After his return in 1919, he executed war memorials for the family firm. Notable memorials built by the firm include the Digger at Blackbutt (1920) and the obelisk at Goodna.

The extant concrete posts and chain surrounding the monument were erected in 1931 to replace a pre-existing wooden fence. Subsequently, to the unveiling of the monument in 1924, the names of Sandgate residents killed in WWII, Malaya, Korea and Vietnam were added to the monument.

A memorial site for the Niuean Anzacs WW1 was unveiled in the Memorial Park on Anzac Day 2015. This is the first known Pacific Island memorial site of its kind in Australia, and the first in the world for the Niuean people outside of their island.

The park that forms the setting for the monument contains a large small-leafed fig that reputedly was a popular meeting place. The grandsons of Hezekiah Shepherd, said to have been an inspector and overseer of works with the then Sandgate Municipal Council, claim that he planted the tree in the early 1880s and built a seat (no longer extant) under it. The rotunda in the park was built during the "Australia Remembers" commemorations in 1995.

== Description ==
Sandgate War Memorial Park is a small island of parkland bounded by Seymour Street, Bowser Parade and Brighton Road. The memorial and surrounding gardens constitute an integrated and contained landscape within the island and provide a verdant forecourt to the former Sandgate Post Office and the former Sandgate Town Hall.

The monument, a cenotaph form reminiscent of the Lutyens' Cenotaph (Whitehall, London), is the central focus of the park. Constructed from coursed pale grey quarry-faced granite, the monument is approximately 2.6 by 1.4 metres (8 ft 6 in × 4 ft 7 in) in plan, rising to a height of about 5 metres (16 ft) from a concrete plinth measuring about 4.6 by 3.7 metres (15 ft × 12 ft). A band of dressed and polished granite forms a collar to the stepped crown of the cenotaph. A low protective painted metal rail is erected to the perimeter of the plinth. Within this protective fence stand decorative bollards linked by metal chains. Plaques to the long sides of the monument list those from the Sandgate district who fell in WWI, WWII and the conflicts in Malaya, Korea and Vietnam. A verse is inscribed to the obverse side:

"They died, and yet in memory shall they live, That we may know the worth of sacrifice, Know that their death is freedom's cause, Stands as a beacon light to point the way To paths of peace".

A large metal utility box located near a path to the north east of the memorial and a recently constructed wooden rotunda in a corner of the park are not considered to be culturally significant.

The park also contains a green painted metal drinking fountain. Concrete paths across the island converge on the monument. The park contains mature palms, shade trees and decorative planted beds and hedges.

== Heritage listing ==
Sandgate War Memorial Park was listed on the Queensland Heritage Register on 3 October 2005 having satisfied the following criteria.

The place is important in demonstrating the evolution or pattern of Queensland's history.

The Sandgate War Memorial Park is important in demonstrating part of the pattern of Queensland's history, being associated with the national outpouring of grief at the death of 60,000 Australians during WWI. During an era of strong and widespread Australian patriotism and nationalism most Queensland communities erected a public memorial to honour local participation in the war. Each monument is a unique historical documentary record.

The place is important in demonstrating the principal characteristics of a particular class of cultural places.

The memorial is important in demonstrating the principal characteristics of its class of cultural places, being a substantial and highly intact commemorative structure erected as a tangible and enduring place of memory to act as a focus for public mourning in the absence of graves. This is achieved through the use of appropriate materials and design elements.

The place is important because of its aesthetic significance.

The memorial and surrounding park make a significant aesthetic contribution to the townscape of Sandgate. The park constitutes an integrated and contained landscape that provides a verdant forecourt to the Sandgate Post Office and the former Sandgate Town Hall.

The place has a strong or special association with a particular community or cultural group for social, cultural or spiritual reasons.

The memorial and park are of social and spiritual significance for the local community, having a strong and continuing association with the community as evidence of the impact of a major historical event and as the focus for annual remembrance of that event in local Anzac Day commemorative ceremonies.

The place has a special association with the life or work of a particular person, group or organisation of importance in Queensland's history.

The memorial is significant as an example of the work of prominent Brisbane architect, G. G. Prentice and the Brisbane masonry firm Lowther and Sons.
