= Edward Broadhurst =

Edward Broadhurst may refer to:

- Edward Broadhurst (politician) (1810–1883), English-born Australian barrister and politician
- Edward Tootal Broadhurst (1858–1922), English cotton manufacturer
