= May Edward Chinn =

American physician (1896–1980)

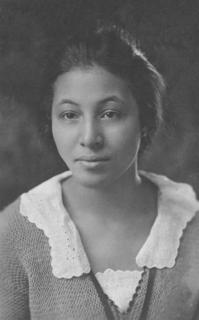
- Chinn c. 1917
- Born: April 15, 1896; Great Barrington, Massachusetts, U.S.
- Died: December 1, 1980 (aged 84); New York City, New York, U.S.
- Education: Teachers College, Columbia University (B.S., 1921); Bellevue Hospital Medical College (M.D., 1926)
- Occupation: Physician
- Known for: First African-American woman graduate of Bellevue Hospital Medical College

May Edward Chinn (April 15, 1896 – December 1, 1980) was an American physician. She was the first African-American woman to graduate from Bellevue Hospital Medical College, now NYU School of Medicine, and the first African-American woman to intern at Harlem Hospital. In her private practice, she provided care for black patients who would not otherwise receive treatment in white facilities. She was also a strong advocate of early cancer screening.

== Early life and education ==
Chinn was born in Great Barrington, Massachusetts, on April 15, 1896, and was raised in New York City. Her father, William Lafayette Chinn, was enslaved from birth in 1852 in Manassas, Virginia. He escaped slavery at the age of 11. Her mother, Lula Ann Evans, was born in 1876 in Norfolk, Virginia. She was an African American descendant of the Chickahominy people, a smaller group within the large Algonquin tribe. Lula Ann Evans worked as a housekeeper on the estate of Charles L. Tiffany, a jeweler living in Irvington, New York. From her earnings, Lula Ann saved enough to send her daughter to Bordentown Manual and Training Industrial School, a boarding school in New Jersey. After contracting osteomyelitis of the jaw, Chinn moved back to New York for surgery. Living with the white Tiffany family, Chinn was exposed to classical music and taught German and French. After the Tiffany family estate was sold due to the death of Charles Tiffany, Chinn and her mother returned to New York City where she resumed her education at a public school and took piano lessons.

Despite not finishing high school due to poverty, Dr. Chinn took the entrance examination to Columbia Teachers College, matriculating in 1917. Chinn initially studied music but changed her major to science after interacting with a racist music professor and getting praise for a scientific paper. Her scientific aptitude was recognized by Jean Broadhurts, her bacteriology professor at the college. By her senior year of undergraduate, Chinn worked in a clinical pathology lab as a laboratory technician. She graduated from Columbia Teachers College in 1921 and continued working in the lab. However, Chinn's love for music never died as she continued to teach piano lessons to younger children and worked as an accompanist to Paul Robeson for four years in the 1920's.

Chinn was an active member of Delta Sigma Theta. In February 1921, she was among the first group of women initiated into the Alpha Beta chapter of the sorority alongside Eslanda Goode Robeson.

== Medical training ==
Chinn proceeded to study medicine at Bellevue Hospital Medical College, becoming its first African-American woman graduate in 1926. Upon graduation, Chinn found that no hospital would allow her practicing privileges because African Americans were not permitted to participate in hospital residencies and research posts at New York hospital clinics. The Rockefeller Institute had seriously considered her for a research fellowship until they discovered that she was black. With her fair skin and last name, many assumed that she was white or Chinese. Harlem Hospital was the only medical institution in the city that offered Chinn an internship. Chinn was the first African-American woman to intern there and to accompany paramedics on ambulance calls. She confronted another obstacle when the hospital refused her practicing privileges there. She later told Muriel Petioni, former president of the Society of Black Women Physicians, that black workers snubbed her because they assumed she was passing as white, and did not want to jeopardize her position. Chinn established a private practice instead, seeing patients in her office and performing procedures in their homes. This experience prompted her to earn a master's degree in public health from Columbia University in 1933. In 1940, Harlem Hospital granted Chinn admitting privileges, in part due to Mayor Fiorello La Guardia's push for integration in the wake of the Harlem Riot of 1935.

== Career ==
In 1944, the Strang Clinic hired Chinn to conduct research on cancer, and she remained there for the next 29 years. The Society of Surgical Oncology invited her to become a member, and in 1975, she established a society to promote African-American women to attend medical school. She maintained her private practice until the age of 81. While attending a reception at Columbia University in honor of a friend, Chinn collapsed and died on December 1, 1980, aged 84.
