= Sandgate Baptist Church =

Sandgate Baptist Church (former)
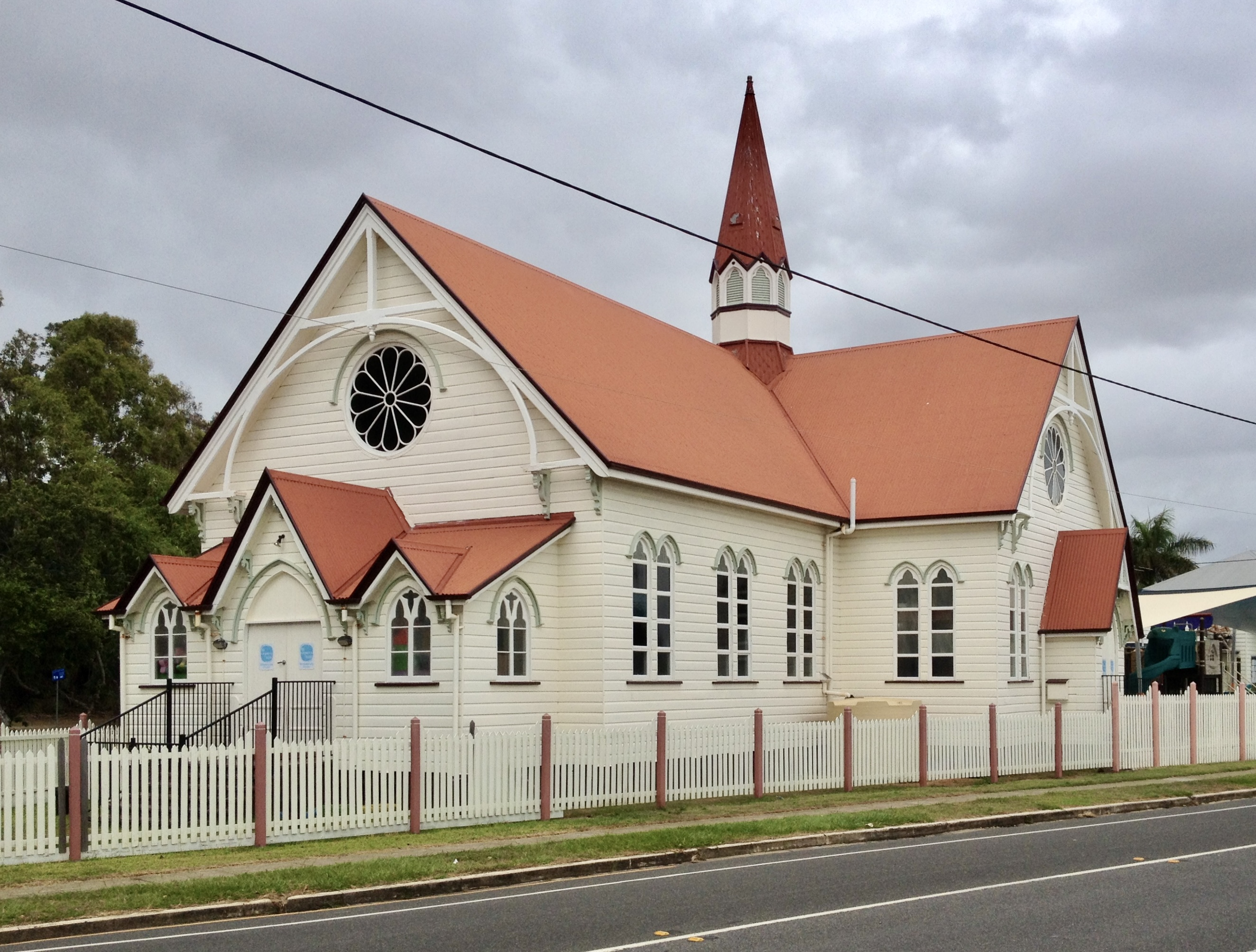
- Former Sandgate Baptist Church, 2014
- Sandgate Baptist Church (former)
- 27°19′13″S 153°04′27″E
- Address: 6–8 Flinders Parade, Sandgate, City of Brisbane, Queensland
- Country: Australia
- Previous denomination: Baptist

History
- Status: Church (1887–c. 2010); Child care centre (since 2010)
- Founded: 1887
- Dedicated: 25 December 1887

Architecture
- Architect: Richard Gailey
- Architectural type: Church (former)
- Style: Carpenter Gothic
- Years built: 1887
- Construction cost: A£1,300
- Closed: c. 2010

Queensland Heritage Register
- Official name: Sandgate Baptist Church (former)
- Type: State heritage (landscape, built)
- Designated: 21 November 2003
- Reference no.: 602424
- Significant period: 1880s (historical); 1880s (fabric) ongoing (social)
- Significant components: Views to, furniture/fittings, spire, church, fence/wall – perimeter, stained glass window/s
- Builders: William Street

Sandgate Baptist Church is a heritage-listed former Baptist church at 6–8 Flinders Parade, Sandgate, City of Brisbane, Queensland, Australia. It was designed by Richard Gailey and built in 1887 by William Street. It was added to the Queensland Heritage Register on 21 November 2003.

== History ==
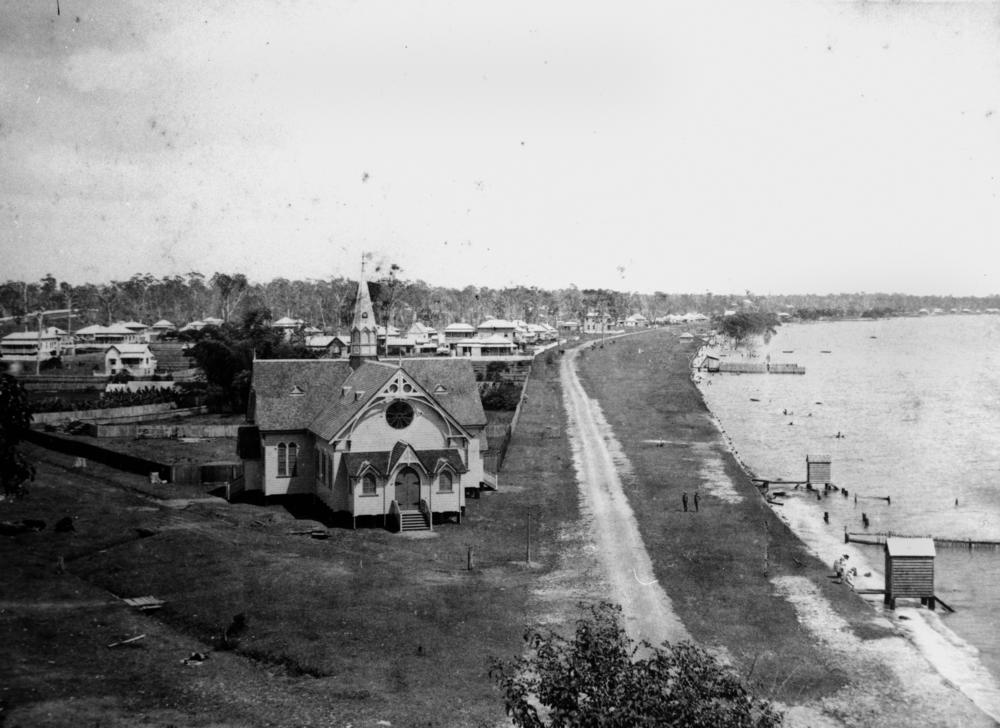
Sandgate Baptist Church, ca. 1890

The former Sandgate Baptist Church is the second Baptist church in Sandgate and opened on Christmas Day 1887.

Baptists first arrived in Queensland in 1851 and were established in Brisbane by 1855. A church was constructed for them in Wharf Street, Brisbane in early 1859, soon after the arrival of Reverend B G Wilson. From this church, preaching stations were begun which developed into suburban churches. From 1868 open-air Baptist services were being held at Sandgate on the shore in the vicinity of the 1887 church.

In September 1852, James Charles Burnett made the first survey of the Sandgate area and the first sales of land were held in 1853. By 1858 25 people were living there and a hotel and shops had been established. In the 1860s, as access to the area improved, Sandgate developed as a seaside town on the English model providing salubrious sea air and a refuge from the oppressive heat of a Brisbane summer. Early Governors of Queensland and other prominent citizens spent holidays at Sandgate and there were guesthouses and houses available for rent from an early date.

=== First church building ===
By 1871 Sandgate had a population of 155 and in 1872 the first Baptist chapel, a small building in Loudon Street, was built. Within two years the settlement had a school and was linked by coach to Brisbane three times a week. By 1877 coaches travelled between Sandgate and Brisbane twice a day. In 1880 Sandgate was declared the Borough of Sandgate (and in 1903 it became the Town of Sandgate) and in 1882 was connected to Brisbane by the Sandgate railway line. This dramatically reduced travel time to less than half an hour and boosted Sandgate's popularity as a place of residence and for holidaymakers and day-trippers.

=== Second church building ===
By 1886 the population of Sandgate had risen to 1598 and the congregation of the Baptist chapel had increased to a point where it had outgrown the chapel in Loudon Street. A church member, George Phillips, donated a triangular piece of land consisting of 27 perches near the sea front at the corner of Flinders Parade and Cliff Street. It was agreed early in 1887 to form a Baptist church separate from the Wharf Street church in Brisbane and the new building was constructed to the design of prominent Brisbane architect, Richard Gailey.

Gailey was trained as an architect in Derry, Ireland, and settled in Brisbane in 1864. He established his own practice in 1865, and over the next 60 years built up a thriving business, working until his death in 1924. He designed many hotels and commercial buildings but also designed numerous churches. A staunch Baptist, he donated his services for a number of church buildings including the Baptist City Tabernacle in Brisbane. He is thought to have designed for the first Baptist chapel in Sandgate.

A local builder, William Street, constructed the new church at a cost of A£1,300, the spire being erected by steeplejack Mr Collins. It originally had a shingled roof and was lit by kerosene lamps. A substantial building in the township, it seated 350 and probably served visitors and holidaymakers as well as the local community. Because it was one of the largest buildings in the developing town, the church was also sought after as a meeting place by several organisations, including the Freemasons. The first Masonic Lodge in Sandgate met there from 1894 until they acquired their own lodge in 1920.

Renovations to the church were undertaken in 1928, 1945 and 1986 when a major renovation project was completed in time for the centenary of the opening of the church. Over time the church roof was replaced with slate, then iron sheeting and finally with coloured metal sheeting. The original kerosene lighting of the church was in turn replaced by gas, then electricity. The structure, however, remains substantially unchanged since its completion.

A modern metal garage adjoined the rear of the church and there was also a single-storey 1960s brick hall to the rear, at the time the church was sold. A purpose-built kindergarten building replaced the hall and the garage has been removed.

=== Deconsecration and later use ===
In 2010, the building was in use as a childcare centre.

In May 2012 the Sandgate Baptist congregation merged with the Geebung Baptist congregation and established a new church, Connect Baptist Church at Deagon.

== Description ==
The former church stands close to the seafront at the corner of Cliff Street and Flinders Parade and is a prominent and well-known landmark in the area.

A timber fence encloses the former church grounds and there is a pair of iron gates set at the street corner in line with the main entrance to the church. The building exhibits the principal characteristics of Carpenter Gothic style through its plan and various elements including its timber construction, steeply pitched roof, prominent timber gables and pointed arch motif to windows and doors.

The building is constructed of timber, cruciform in plan, and set on concrete piers. The space between the piers is filled with concrete blockwork.

The steeply pitched gabled roof is clad with corrugated metal sheeting and has an octagonal lantern and spire set at the roof crossing. This is clad in decorative pressed metal sheeting and has timber louvres set in panels at the base. The projecting gables to nave and transepts ends are decorated with fretwork panels above arched timber framing and have a rose window set with pink and blue coloured glass. Pairs of lancet windows set with obscure glass and sheltered by label mouldings also light the church. The main entrance porch has projecting gables over the door and flanking arched windows. There are smaller porches to the transepts and rear.

There is an entrance vestibule and two pairs of arched timber doors set with leadlight opens into the main body of the church. The walls and ceiling are lined with beaded boards and the roof is supported by hammer beam. The floor is presently carpeted and there is a low platform at the western end. This has gothic influenced panelling at the rear and has a small room on each side of the platform with the doors concealed in the panelling. Office rooms with a small gallery above have been constructed in the northern transept.

There was a modern metal garage at the southwest corner of the building and a single-storey 1960s brick hall to the rear of the church at the time the church was sold. These structures were not considered to have heritage significance. The garage has been removed and the hall demolished and replaced by a purpose-built kindergarten building.

== Heritage listing ==
The former Sandgate Baptist Church was listed on the Queensland Heritage Register on 21 November 2003 having satisfied the following criteria.

The place is important in demonstrating the evolution or pattern of Queensland's history.

The former Sandgate Baptist Church is important in demonstrating the development of the Sandgate area, an early settlement close to Brisbane that became a popular seaside resort serving the city. The church was built in 1887 following the boom in Sandgate's population as a consequence of its connection with Brisbane by rail. It is the second Baptist church in Sandgate and reflects the growth of the Baptist Union in Queensland, replacing a small chapel built-in 1872. The size and quality of the church reflect not just the growth of the area but the importance given to religious observance in the nineteenth century Queensland.

The place is important in demonstrating the principal characteristics of a particular class of cultural places.

The former Sandgate Baptist Church is an excellent and substantially intact example of a timber church of its era in the Carpenter Gothic style.

The place is important because of its aesthetic significance.

It has aesthetic value as a well-composed building on a landmark site on the seafront. In its form, scale and detail it makes an important visual contribution to the built character of Sandgate, a fact acknowledged by its popularity over the years as a subject for photographs.

The place has a strong or special association with a particular community or cultural group for social, cultural or spiritual reasons.

The former Sandgate Baptist Church has a long association with the people of Sandgate and the surrounding district, being a place of worship and a meeting place for community groups for over a hundred years.
