= Broadhurst, Sandgate =

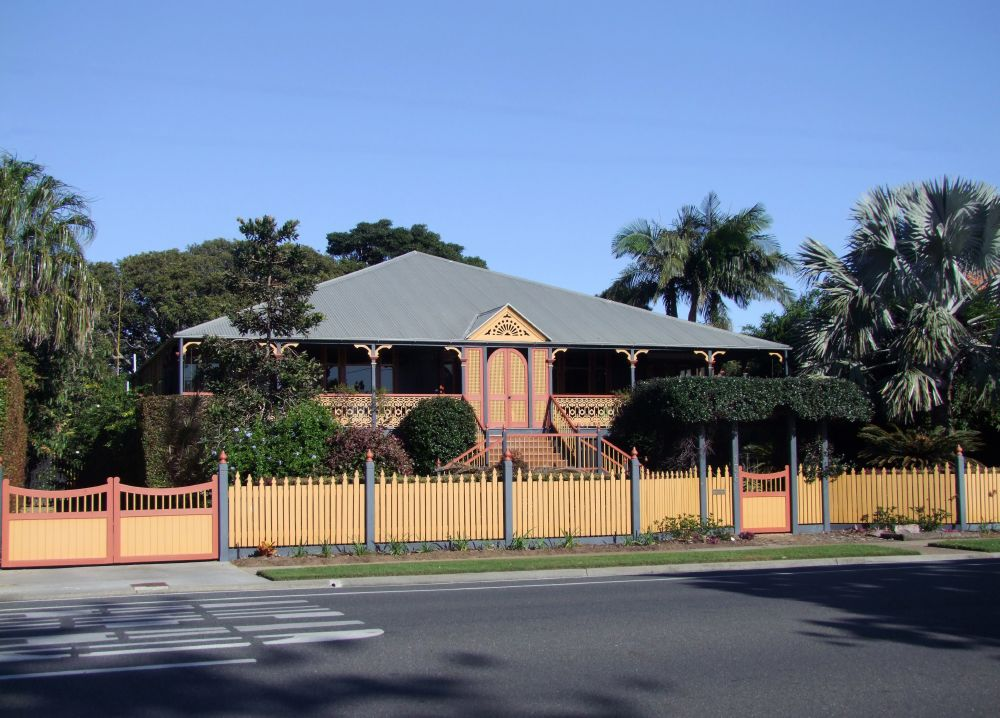
- Broadhurst, 2015

- Location within Queensland Location within Australia
- 27.3155°S 153.0698°E
- Location: 138 Flinders Parade, Sandgate, City of Brisbane, Queensland, Australia

History
- Design period: 1900–1914 (early 20th century)
- Built: c. 1900–c. 1901
- Built for: Hugh McCall Hicks

Queensland Heritage Register
- Official name: 138 Flinders Parade, Sandgate, Broadhurst, Convalescent Home, Sandgate Home-Maternal and Child Welfare Service
- Type: state heritage (landscape, built)
- Designated: 29 September 1997
- Reference no.: 601515
- Significant period: c. 1900 (fabric); 1900s–1940s (historical); 1902–1994 (social)
- Significant components: kitchen/kitchen house, trees/plantings, residential accommodation – main house, staircase/stairs – divided, views from

Broadhurst is a heritage-listed detached house at 138 Flinders Parade, Sandgate, City of Brisbane, Queensland, Australia. It was built from c. 1900 to c. 1901. It is also known as Broadhurst, Convalescent Home, and Sandgate Home-Maternal and Child Welfare Service. It was added to the Queensland Heritage Register on 29 September 1997.

== History ==
This single-storeyed timber building was erected by the turn of the century, at which time it was known as "Broadhurst", and was the residence of Hugh McCall Hicks, and his wife Florence. Hicks was the General Manager of Perkins and Co. Ltd in Brisbane, and is recorded as living at Sandgate from the mid 1890s.

Sandgate began development in the 1860s, particularly for those who could afford private transport and holiday residences. With the extension of the railway from Brisbane to Sandgate in 1882, the permanent population grew, and weekend holiday-makers turned the township into a bustling seaside resort. The town of Sandgate was geographically divided into two areas, comprising the Upper Esplanade which included the area around Shorncliffe and Moora Park, and the Lower Esplanade which included Flinders Parade and Brighton. By the early twentieth century substantial buildings had been erected along the western (land) side of Flinders Parade, including Cremorne, built by the McCallum family, Meridian with its private bowling green, Broadhurst, and other substantial houses which overlooked Bramble Bay.

The allotments on Section 5A in the town of Sandgate were auctioned in October 1882. Allotments 4 and 5, on which the building appears to have been erected, were acquired by William Stevens and Joseph Baynes respectively. In 1890, the two allotments were acquired by Brisbane builder and contractor, John Irwen Balls. As this was the first time that allotments 4 and 5 were jointly owned, it is likely that the building was erected after 1890.

Balls was declared insolvent in 1892, and his estate, which included the land at Sandgate as well as land at South Brisbane and Indooroopilly, was transferred to the Royal Bank of Queensland.

In early 1900, Hicks and his wife acquired half of allotment 4 adjacent to allotment 5, allotment 5, and land at the rear of the two allotments. A photograph of Broadhurst, the residence of Mr HM Hicks appeared in the Queenslander in May 1901.

In July 1901, members of the Brisbane Hospital Committee visited Hicks' residence, which was adjacent to the premises being rented for use as a convalescent home at that time. The Committee had maintained a convalescent home in rented premises at Sandgate from 1885. By 1901, the Committee were looking to acquire its own property, and in late 1901, Hicks' formal offer of the property for £1250 was accepted by the Committee. Alterations were undertaken to make the building suitable for use as a convalescent home, and the first transfer of convalescent patients to the home took place in December 1901. The alterations were designed by DF Brown, House Steward. James Stodart, a Brisbane businessman and Member of the Queensland Legislative Assembly for Logan, was chairman and treasurer of the Committee at this time.

An inspection of the new convalescent home by members of the Hospital Committee, politicians, the Mayor of Sandgate, the Medical Superintendent of the Brisbane General Hospital, Hicks and others, took place in March 1902. Speeches given as part of the inspection referred to the benefits, both medical and economic, of the Sandgate home, and unbounded satisfaction with the home was expressed by the Committee. In the Annual Report of the Brisbane Hospital for 1910, the home was described as a valuable outwork of the Hospital...providing rest, nourishment and comfort during the days of convalescence of many of the patients. Nurses worked at the convalescent home as part of their general hospital training, and the recollections of a former nurse record that as a first year trainee, she was the only nurse at the home together with the Matron, and that she was shown how to do dressings and other work which was not normally done until the second year of training.

The title for the land which had been transferred to Stodart, JD Campbell and SW Brooks in 1902, was subsequently transferred to the Brisbane and South Coast Hospitals Board in 1924.

The convalescent home was closed in 1942, and in 1943 the property was transferred to the Crown for Maternal and Child Welfare purposes. Allotment 6, immediately to the north west of the convalescent home had remained in private ownership until 1918, at which time it was transferred to the Crown, and was later included in the Maternal and Child Welfare reserve. On subsequent plans, the building located on allotment 6 is indicated as a Nurses home.

In March 1944, the "Sandgate Home" was opened by the Maternal and Child Welfare Section of the Department of Health, as a home for the admission of children whose mothers have been taken seriously ill and for whose care no other suitable arrangements can be made. The opening of the Home represented an expansion of the work of the Section. It is also possible that the buildings were utilised for children as part of the scheme developed to assist "Bush Children".

Quarters for the nursing staff were altered and enlarged during the late 1940s, and new buildings added to the site during the mid 1950s included dining and recreation rooms, these buildings were demolished in June 1997.

From 1983 the property was used by the Intellectual Disability Services section, initially located within the Department of Health and later within the Department of Family Services. The Sandgate Centre provided both long and short term residential care for intellectually challenged children, and a family respite centre. By the early 1990s, the Centre was considered to be outdated in terms of its use as a residential facility, and was closed in April 1994.

The property was acquired by the Department of Housing, Local Government and Planning in July 1994.

In 2016, it is occupied by a personal development organisation.

== Description ==
Broadhurst, located fronting Bramble Bay and a foreshore reserve to the northeast, is a single-storeyed timber building with a hipped corrugated iron roof. The building has timber and concrete stumps with timber batten infill and steel posts. Wide verandahs on three sides have been enclosed with fibrous cement sheeting and casement windows, and a projecting bay section is located on the northwest. Sections of original cast iron balustrade and chamfered timber posts are visible on the northwest.

The central northeast entry is surmounted by a small gable with a fretwork panel and is accessed via a twin stair to a landing. The rear of the building has an enclosed verandah on the southeast, which is narrower than the others, and a weatherboard enclosed landing, which is a later addition, at the rear of a brick chimney stack. The sub-floor space is mostly concreted, with a masonry room at the rear which is used as a workshop.

Internally, the building has a wider front section containing major rooms, with a narrower rear section containing service rooms with lower ceilings. A wide central hallway from the main entry to the rear has rooms opening to either side, with the rear section being slightly narrower and with lower ceilings and less detailing.

The main entry has a timber panelled door with sidelights and fanlight, some of which retain leadlight panels. The front hallway has vertical timber boarding with exposed framing which has shaped edge detailing, deep timber skirtings and boarded ceilings with timber frame patterning. A timber arch is located mid-way in the front section, and consists of two ionic timber columns on timber bases supporting an entablature with a deep cornice, above which springs an arch with timber batten infill with turned details. A second arch is located separating the front section of the hallway from the rear, and has pronounced timber imposts, extrados and keystone. The rear of the hallway has a panelled timber door with sidelights and fanlight with leadlight panels, leading to the rear landing.

In the front section, panelled timber doors with fanlights open off the hallway. The two main rooms on the northwest have bays with sash windows and are separated by a double sided fireplace with timber surrounds. Partition walls either side of the fireplace have been removed. These rooms have boarded ceilings with timber frame patterning, vertically boarded walls and timber skirtings. Step-out sash windows open to the northeast and French doors open to the southeast. The southeast side of the front section consists of one long room, the original dividing walls having been removed. A head height partition screen with fixed glazing and central doors divides the space, and a kitchenette is located in the southern corner. The verandah space has single-skin vertically boarded walls, and is lined with fibrous cement sheeting.

The rear section of the building has French doors and deep chamferboards to the southeast enclosed verandah. A former kitchen with masonry fireplace is located at the rear, and a room with built-in timber cupboards is adjacent. Store rooms and a kitchen are located across the hallway on the northwest.

The grounds contain a number of mature trees, including a group of three camphor laurels to the southwest, and an adjacent poinciana to the west.

== Heritage listing ==
Broadhurst was listed on the Queensland Heritage Register on 29 September 1997 having satisfied the following criteria.

The place is important in demonstrating the evolution or pattern of Queensland's history.

Erected in the late nineteenth century for a Brisbane businessman, and as one of a number of substantial residences located at Sandgate overlooking Bramble Bay, the former residence demonstrates the desirability of Sandgate, in particular Flinders Parade, as a residential location from this time.

From its opening in 1901 as a convalescent home for the Brisbane Hospital, until its closure as a centre for intellectually challenged persons in 1994, by which time the centre was considered to provide an outdated form of institutional accommodation, the building is associated with the development of institutional residential care during the twentieth century.

The place is important in demonstrating the principal characteristics of a particular class of cultural places.

This former residence contains large and highly ornamented interior spaces that exhibit the high quality of workmanship and materials behind the designs.

The place is important because of its aesthetic significance.

This substantial former residence contains large and highly decorative interior spaces which exhibit high quality of workmanship, materials and climatic design. Although the verandahs have been enclosed, evidence of original detailing and materials exists which suggest the visual contribution this building once made to the Sandgate foreshore.
