= Sandgate Town Hall =

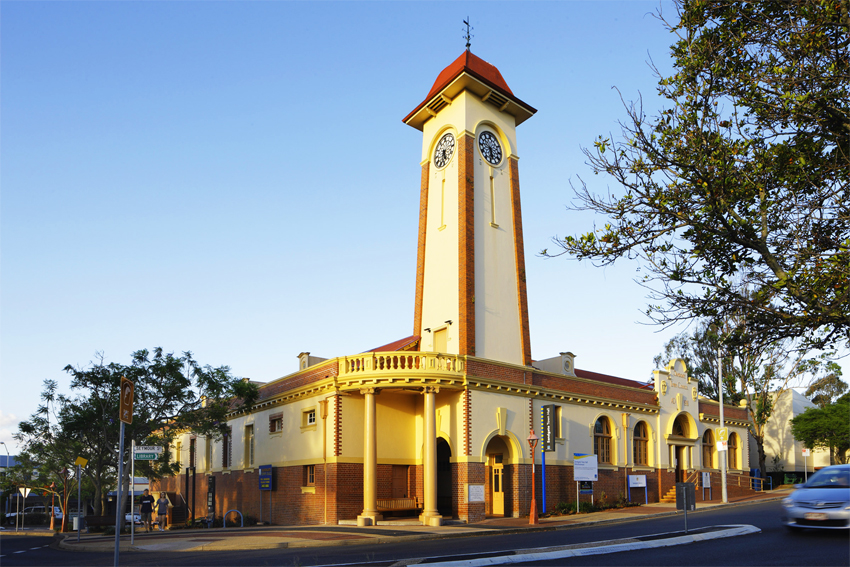
- Sandgate Town Hall, 2012

- Location within Queensland Location within Australia
- 27.3206°S 153.0705°E
- Location: 5 Brighton Road, Sandgate, City of Brisbane, Queensland, Australia

History
- Design period: 1900–1914 (early 20th century)
- Built: 1911–1912
- Built for: Sandgate Town Council

Site notes
- Architect: Thomas Ramsay Hall
- Architectural style: Classicism
- Owner: Brisbane City Council

Queensland Heritage Register
- Official name: Sandgate Town Hall
- Type: state heritage (built)
- Designated: 13 January 1995
- Reference no.: 601566
- Significant period: 1911–1924 (historical); 1911–ongoing (social); 1910s (fabric)
- Significant components: library – chamber/room, hall, views from, furniture/fittings, dress circle, office/s, stage/sound shell, tower – clock, views to
- Builders: John Gemmell

Sandgate Town Hall is a heritage-listed town hall at 5 Brighton Road, Sandgate, City of Brisbane, Queensland, Australia. It was designed by Thomas Ramsay Hall and built from 1911 to 1912 by John Gemmell. It was added to the Queensland Heritage Register on 13 January 1995.

== History ==
The Sandgate Town Hall was constructed in 1911–1912 when the previous chambers were destroyed by fire on 24 May 1910. The architect of the hall, which cost £5000, was Thomas Ramsay Hall, and the contractor John Gemmell.

Britons first settled in Sandgate in the 1850s, and the area prospered into the following century as the principal sea-side resort in south east Queensland, encouraged by the introduction of the railway in May 1882. The Town of Sandgate was established in 1902, previously included as part of the Nundah Division from 1879, then established as a separate Borough of Sandgate in April 1880.

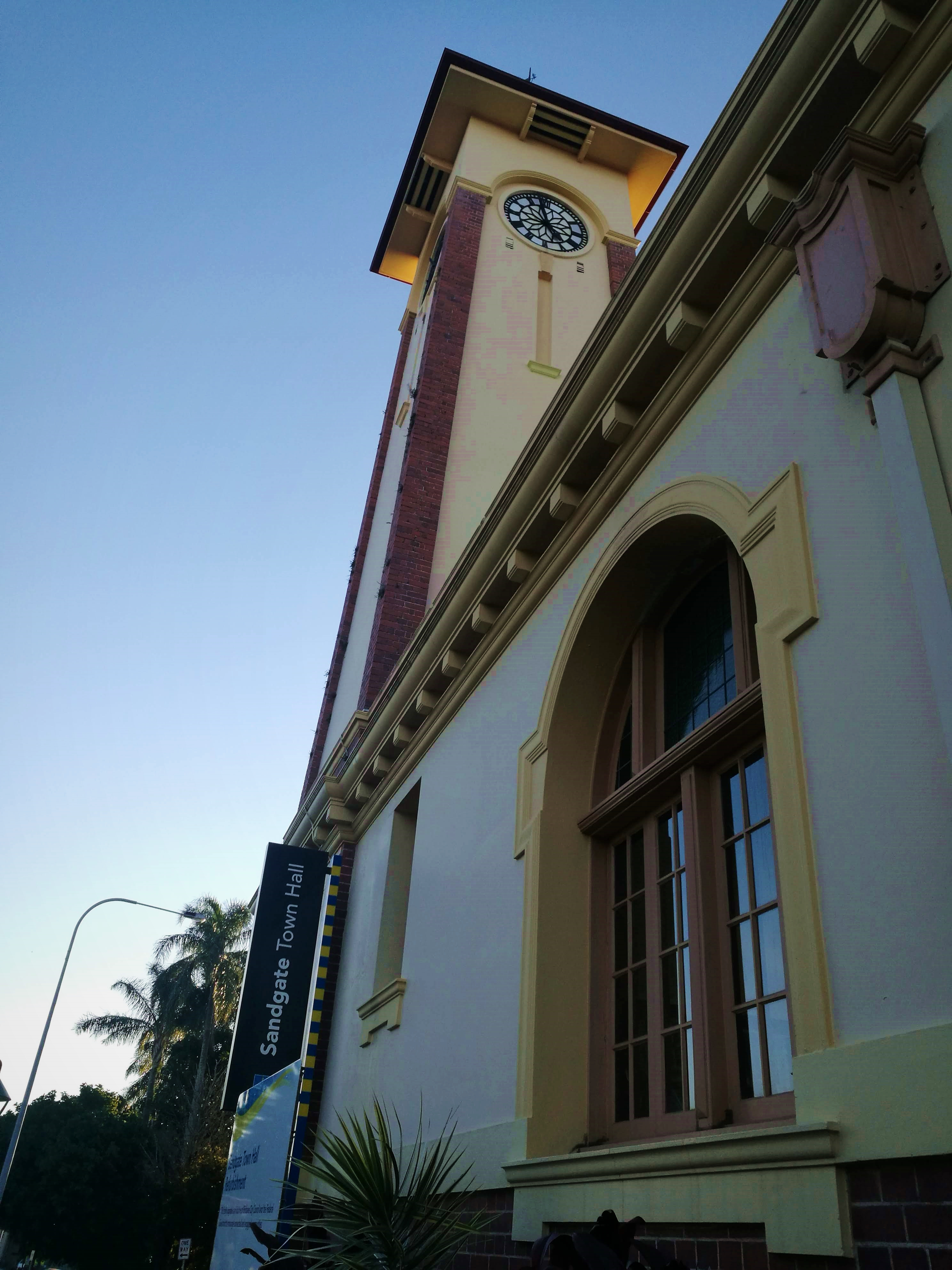
Clock tower facing Seymour Street, Sandgate

The first Municipal Council meetings from 1880 until 1882 were held in a large room rented in a masonry building, thought to be the oldest building in Sandgate. The first official Sandgate Municipal Chambers and Town Hall was designed by Richard Gailey in 1882, and built in Kate Street near the popular pier and bathing area in what is now Shorncliffe. However, as Sandgate progressed, the centre of development was nearer the Sandgate railway station in Rainbow Street. Therefore, when a fire in 1910 destroyed the chambers a site for the new Town Hall was chosen closer to the Sandgate railway station and the 1887 Sandgate Post Office.

The foundation stone for the Sandgate Town Hall was laid by Sir William MacGregor, Governor of Queensland, on 14 October 1911. The building was constructed by John Gemmell, in eleven months, at a cost of £5000 including £300 for furnishing. Thomas Ramsay Hall, the architect, was then the Town Clerk of Sandgate. Later in his career, Hall went into partnership with George Gray Prentice (1919–1929) and designed such buildings as the Brisbane City Hall and from 1929 to 1948, he was in partnership with Lionel Blythewood Phillips with whom he designed many buildings, including Ascot Chambers and the McWhirters corner block.

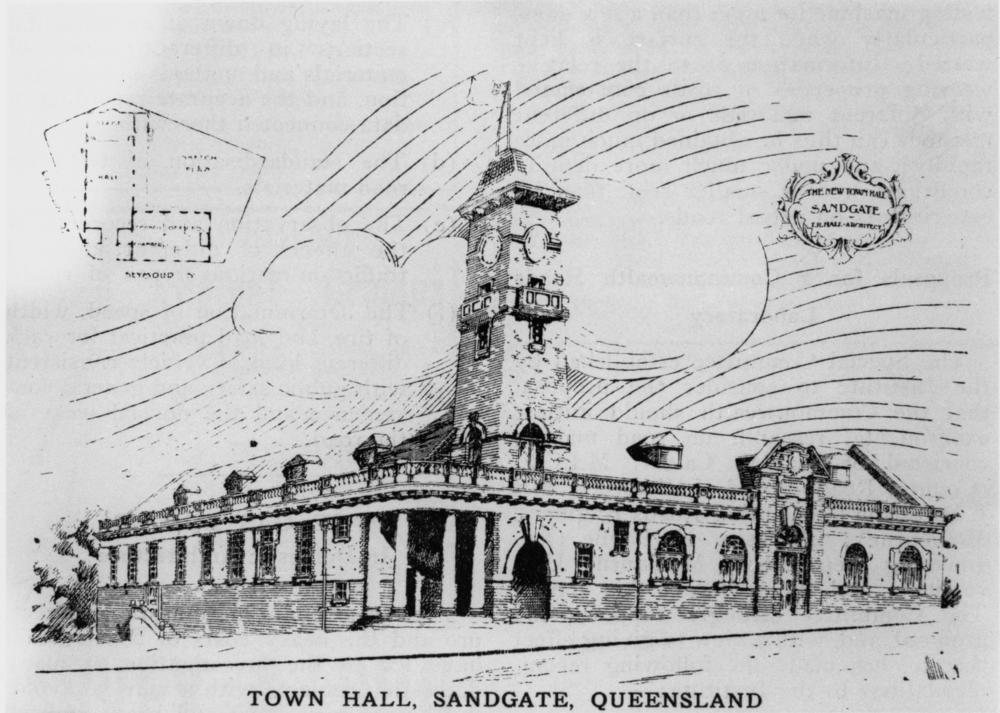
Architectural drawing, 1919

The Sandgate Town Hall was designed to sit on a prominent corner, and was therefore an L-shaped building with wings extending along both streets; the hall in the Brighton Road wing was accessed from the principal corner entrance and Council Chambers and various offices were accessed from a centrally located entrance on Seymour Street. The rear elevation featured a balcony opening from both the hall and the offices. The clock tower climbed three levels from the cloak room near the principal corner entrance, with room allocated for the clock on the second level and a bell on the third.

The Town Hall was opened on 21 September 1912 by the Queensland Governor, William MacGregor, at a ceremony attended by 500 people. A four dial clock, acquired from the Old Ipswich Town Hall by a Brisbane watchmaker, Frederick John Bright, was installed in the clocktower in 1923. The clock is reputedly one of the oldest working clocks in Brisbane, built by Gillet and Johnstone of Croydon, England in 1877.

In 1925, under the requirements of the City of Brisbane Act of 1924, the Town of Sandgate merged with 19 other local government areas to form the Greater Brisbane, and the Sandgate Town Hall was retained by the new Brisbane City Council for use as a community hall, variously acting as the library for the school of arts and a health clinic. The main hall is currently used for public meetings and other community gatherings the council library operates from the former Council Chambers and offices which were altered for this purpose.

== Description ==
Sandgate Town Hall is a single-storeyed masonry building with a partial basement floor. The building has a gabled corrugated-iron roof and features a face-brick plinth and rough-cast stuccoed facade. It is L-shaped in plan with a prominent clock tower near the intersection of the two wings. The stuccoed tower has face brick corner pilasters and decorative mouldings. A bellcast roof sheeted with decorative pressed metal conceals the three bells and is surmounted by a weathervane.

The town hall has square-arched openings to the Brighton Street wing and round arched openings to the other. The principal entrance, at the corner of the site is defined by two massive Ionic columns, behind which a recessed entrance porch is located. The entrance to the library, on Seymour Street, is emphasised by a decorative parapeted section featuring Art Nouveau signage "SANDGATE TOWN COUNCIL AD 1911" and a large round arched opening with floral leadlight window. Other decorative elements include face-brick quoining, Art Nouveau signage, roughcast stucco render in some sections, and dormer windows.

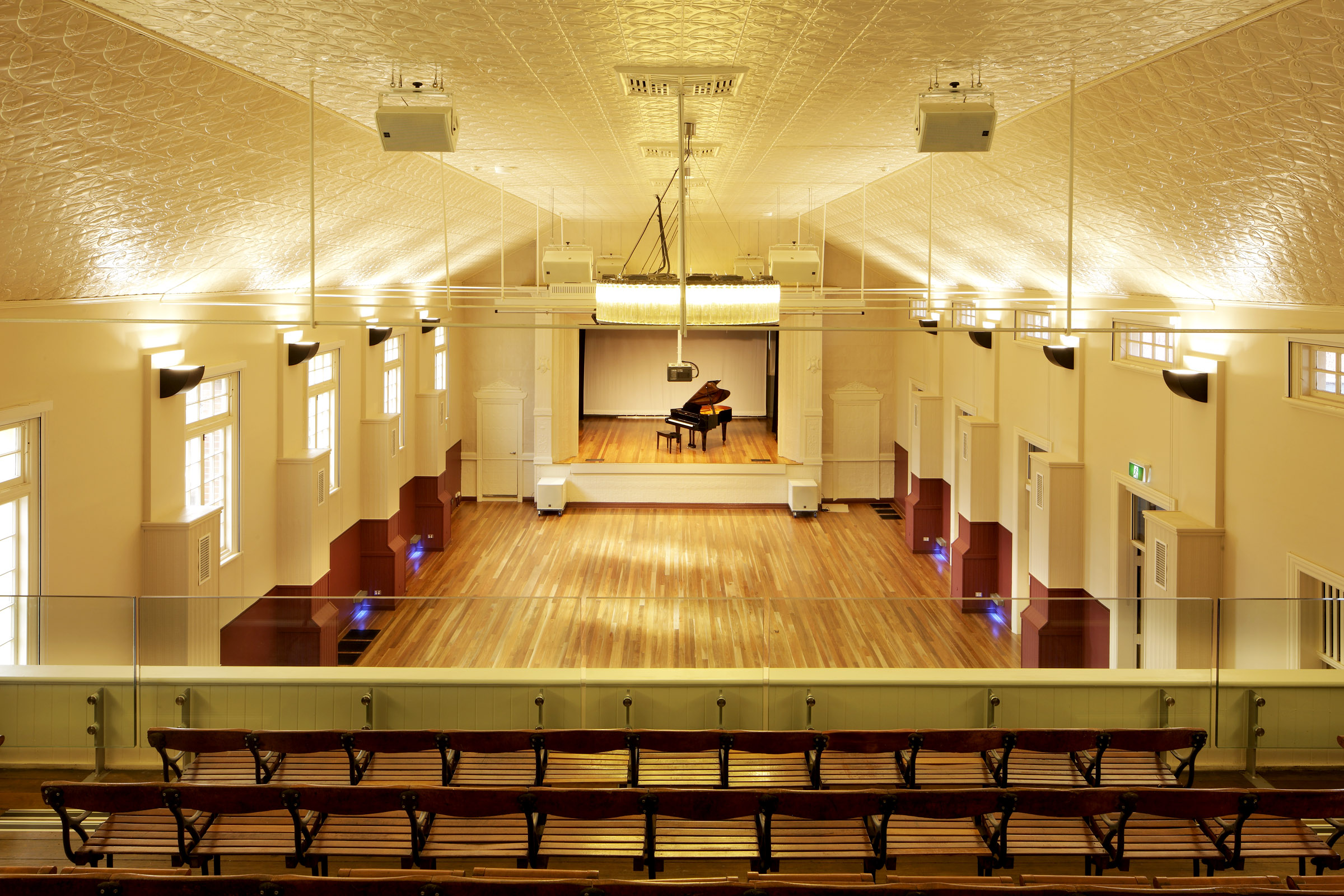
Hall and stage viewed from the dress circle, 2011

Internally the building features a large hall and stage, a library chamber and various administrative offices. The hall has a mezzanine dress circle level, with early timber and iron row seating. The ceiling of the hall and the proscenium arch are sheeted with decorative pressed metal. The clock tower is accessed in the vestibule at the rear of the dress circle by a fixed timber ladder leading to three levels containing various clock workings, weights and bells.

The library features four different patterns of pressed metal on the ceiling, which indicate the original layout of the space. An early half-glazed door in the library has an embossed pattern, featuring lettering "THE MAYOR" in stylised Art Nouveau lettering.

== Heritage listing ==
Sandgate Town Hall was listed on the Queensland Heritage Register on 13 January 1995 having satisfied the following criteria.

The place is important in demonstrating the evolution or pattern of Queensland's history.

The Sandgate Town Hall provides evidence of the Town of Sandgate in the late 19th and early 20th centuries.

The place is important in demonstrating the principal characteristics of a particular class of cultural places.

Sandgate Town Hall, erected in 1911–1912, is significant as an excellent example of a Federation style civic building in Queensland.

It is an intact example of the civic work of renowned Brisbane architect, Thomas Ramsay Hall.

The place is important because of its aesthetic significance.

The building is a landmark on a prominent site in Sandgate, of particular note for its unusual clocktower, and as an integral element of the precinct including the Post Office and Sandgate War Memorial Park.

The place has a strong or special association with a particular community or cultural group for social, cultural or spiritual reasons.

The building has a long association with the local community as a focal point for social and community functions.
