= Dowse Lagoon =

Lake in Brisbane, Australia

- Second Lagoon
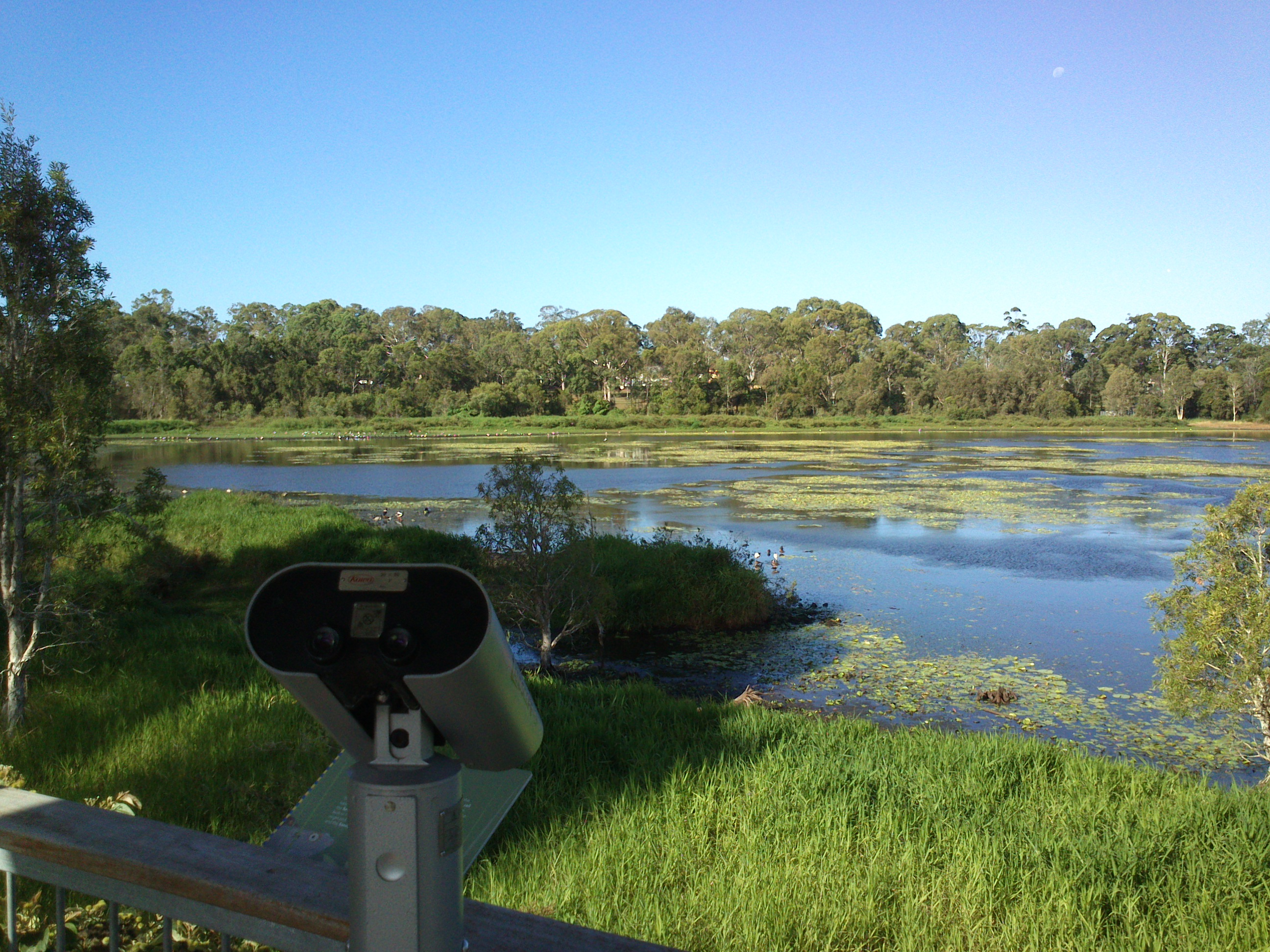
- Binoculars & view of Dowse Lagoon

- Location within Queensland Location within Australia
- Interactive map of Dowse Lagoon
- Location: Sandgate, City of Brisbane, Queensland
- Coordinates: 27.317°S 153.064°E
- Type: Lagoon
- Etymology: Thomas Dowse
- Basin countries: Australia
- Designation: Ramsar site
- Surface area: 21.87 hectares (54.0 acres)
- Max. depth: 300 millimetres (12 in)

Dowse Lagoon is a park and lake located in Sandgate, a suburb of the City of Brisbane, Queensland, Australia.

== History ==
Before 1975, it was largely known as the "Second Lagoon", a reference to the presence of another lagoon in Sandgate.

The lagoon was named in 1975, after Thomas Dowse, a merchant and early settler of Brisbane.

It was identified as a Ramsar site in 1993.

Dowse Lagoon was badly damaged by the 2000s Australian drought, which led to calls for its revitalisation.
