= Susan Broadhurst =

British academic

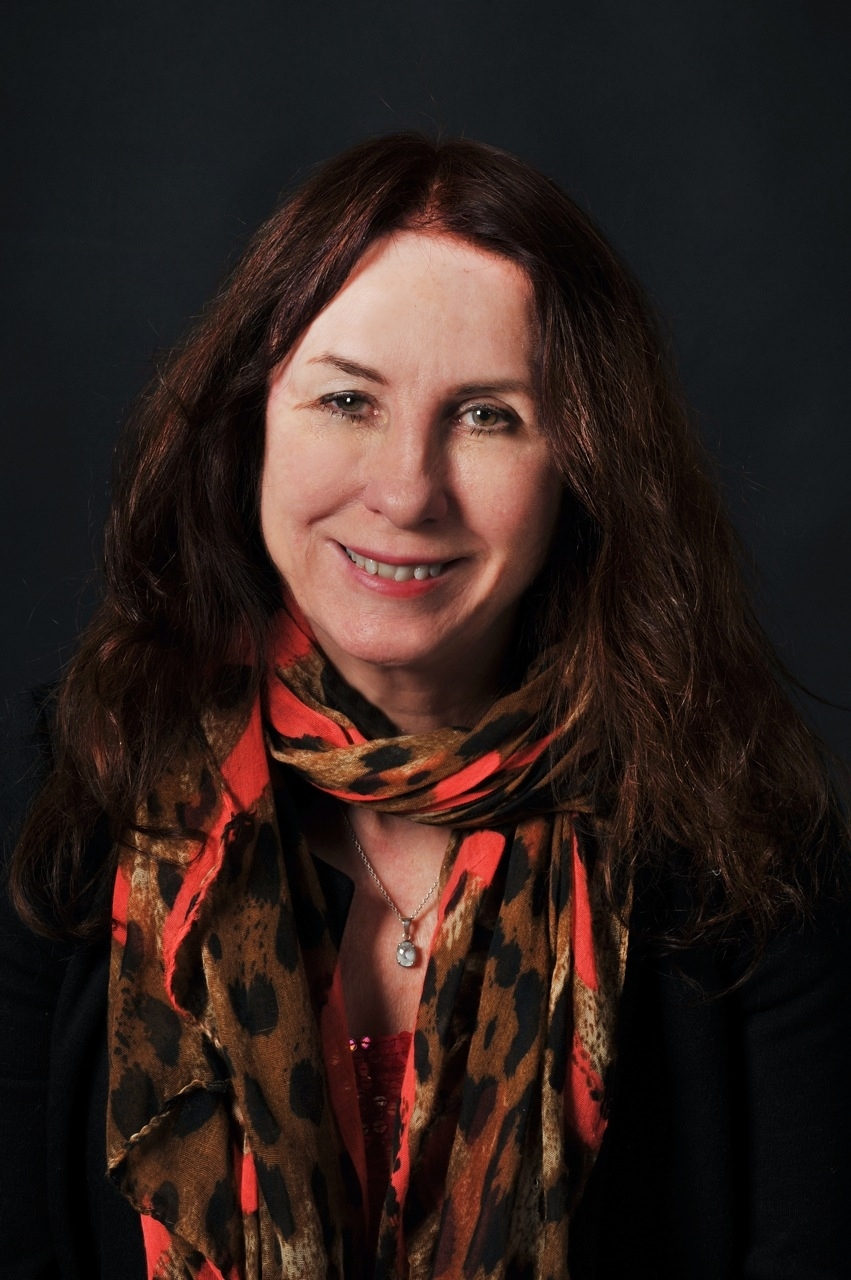

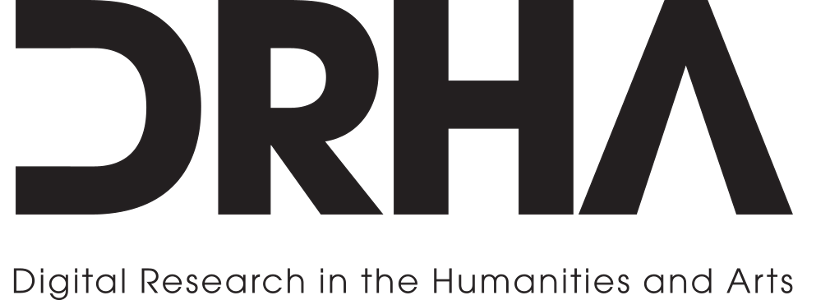
Digital Research in the Humanities and Arts organisation Logo

Susan Broadhurst is a performance art practitioner, writer and academic. She is Professor Emerita of Performance and Technology, and Honorary Professor, at Brunel University London. Formerly, she was the Head of Research in the Department of Arts and Humanities and also led the Division of Production and Performance (Film and television, Music and Theatre).

She graduated first class in English and Comparative literature and earned her Doctorate in 1996. Her research is focused on experimental drama. She was a founder of the Body, Space & Technology Research group at Brunel, now the Centre for Contemporary and Digital Performance.

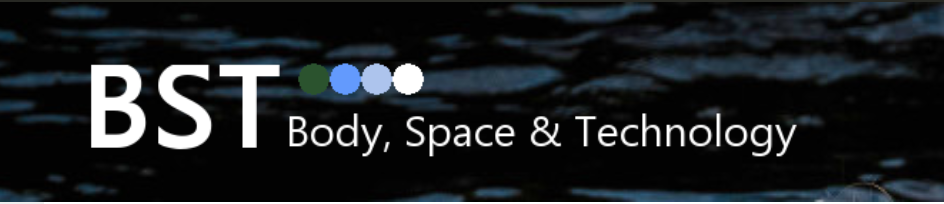
Body, Space & Technology (BST) is a leading journal of contemporary artistic practice and research Journal

== Published works and performances ==
Broadhurst is the author of two books, four edited collections, and academic papers on performance, with an emphasis on live art, dance, music, film, aesthetics, neuroesthetics, technology and bio-technology. Broadhurst is co-editor, with Barry Edwards, of the Body, Space & Technology Journal (Open Library of Humanities), and of the Palgrave ‘Studies in Performance and Technology’ book series with Josephine Machon.

In 2000, Broadhurst began and organized ‘Intelligence, Interaction, Reaction and Performance’, a series of performances and installations exploring the interface between physicality, digital interactivity, AI technology, and biotechnology in contemporary and performance art. She was part of a symposium related to these interactive performances held in 2008 at London's Institute of Contemporary Arts. In 2010, she convened at Brunel a ‘Digital Research in the Humanities and Arts’ (DRHA.UK) Conference titled: ‘Sensual Technologies: Collaborative Practices of Interdisciplinarity’.

She collaborates internally (and externally to Brunel), in interdisciplinary combinations including: engineering, design, psychology, biology, and bioengineering. Academic colleagues at the London Knowledge Lab, University College London, the Royal College of Art, and the London College of Fashion collaborated with Broadhurst on an ESRC funded project entitled, 'Border-Crossing Digital Arts and Social Science: New Methodological Approaches to Embodiment' .

Broadhurst has been a keynote speaker at international events, conferences and media festivals. She is the Chair of the DRHA Organization which holds annual international conferences on these areas of research. She was Programme Chair for several of these and leads in organising conferences at international venues. In 2020, due to the coronavirus pandemic, this was held virtually at Media City, University of Salford and in 2021 it is planned for Humboldt University in Berlin.

Publications

- Monographs
  - Digital Practices: Aesthetic and Neuroesthetic Approaches to Performance and Technology (2007, Palgrave Macmillan) ISBN 978-0-230-58984-1
  - Liminal Acts: A Critical Overview of Contemporary Performance and Theory (1999, Bloomsbury) ISBN 9781441144713
- Edited collections
  - Digital Bodies: Creativity and Technology in the Arts and Humanities (2017, Palgrave Macmillan), co-edited with Sara Price ISBN 978-1-349-95241-0
  - Identity, Performance and Technology: Practices of Empowerment, Embodiment and Technicity (2012, Palgrave Macmillan), co-edited with Josephine Machon ISBN 978-1-137-28444-0
  - Sensualities/Textualities and Technologies: Writings of the Body in 21st Century Performance (2009, Palgrave Macmillan), co-edited with Josephine Machon ISBN 978-0-230-24853-3
  - Performance and Technology: Practices of virtual embodiment and interactivity (2006, Palgrave Macmillan) co-edited with Josephine Machon ISBN 978-1-4039-9907-8
- Recent articles and book chapters
  - ‘László Moholy-Nagy's "Theatre of Totality": A Precursor to Digital Performance’. Theatre and Performance Design, 5 (1 & 2) (2019): 22 – 42. ISSN 2332-2551
  - ‘Hybridised Performance: Disruption and Deferment in Wagner’s Tristan and Isolde’. Body, Space and Technology, 17 (1) (2018): 95 – 117.
  - 'Hybridity, Empathy and the “Total Artwork” in Metamorphosis: Titian’, Brodesco, A. and Giordano, F. (eds.)
  - Body Images in the Post-Cinematic Scenario: The Digitization of Bodies, pp. 85 – 98 (Milan: Mimesis International, 2018). ISBN 8869771091
  - ‘Aesthetics, Neuroaesthetics and Embodiment: Theorising Performance and Technology’. Patrizia Veroli and Gianfranco Vinay (eds.) Music-Dance. Sound and Motion in Contemporary Discourse, pp. 85, 235–48 (London: Routledge, 2017). ISBN 9781138280519
