= Sandgate Post Office =

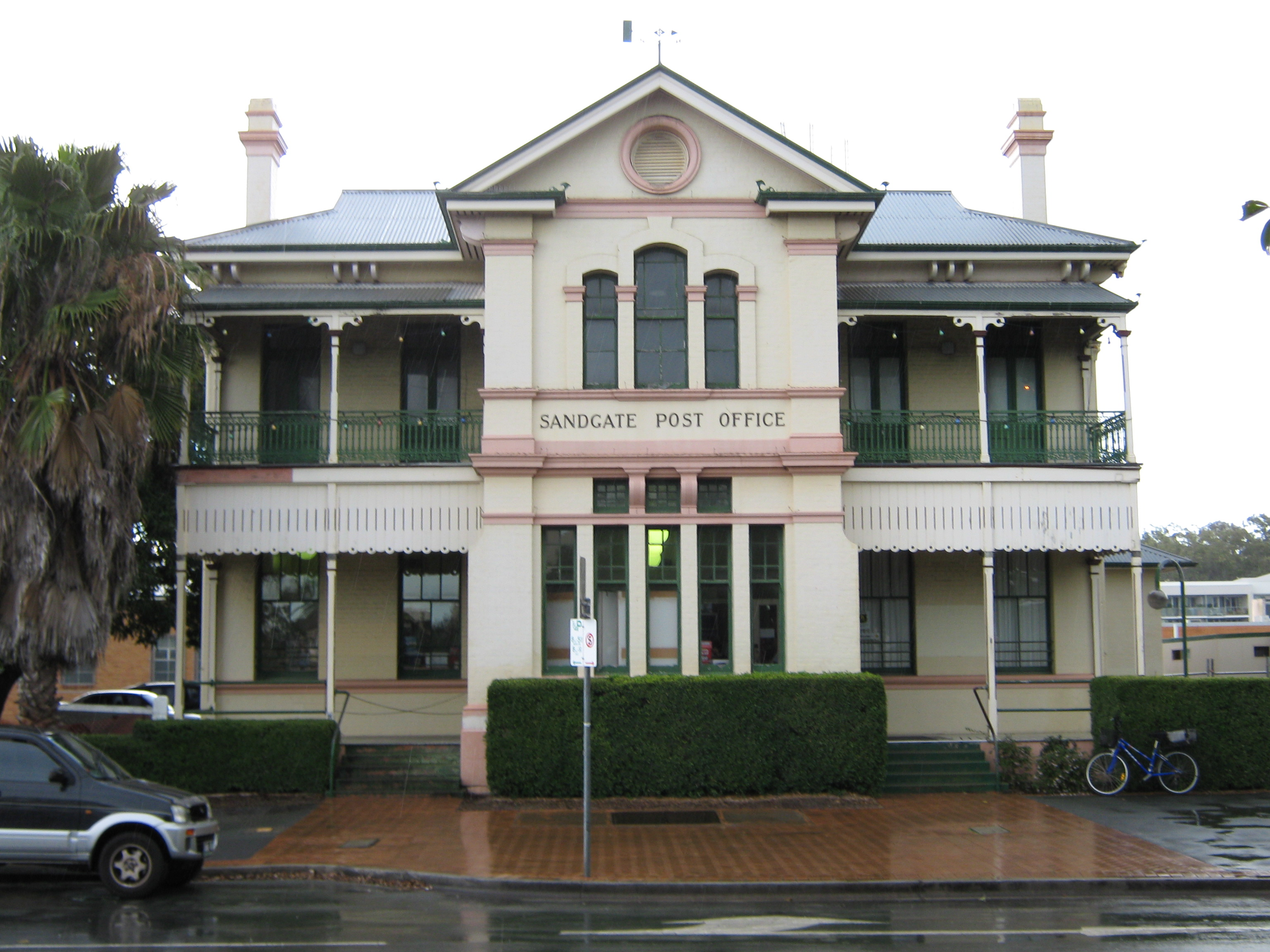
- Sandgate Post Office, 2008

- Location within Queensland Location within Australia
- 27.321°S 153.069°E
- Location: 1 Bowser Parade, Sandgate, City of Brisbane, Queensland, Australia

History
- Design period: 1870s–1890s (late 19th century)
- Built: 1886–1887

Site notes
- Architect: Office of the Queensland Colonial Architect

Queensland Heritage Register
- Official name: Sandgate Post Office, Sandgate Post, Telegraph Office
- Type: state heritage (built)
- Designated: 7 February 2005
- Reference no.: 600290
- Significant period: 1886–1887, c. 1907 (fabric); 1886–c. 2004 (historical)
- Significant components: post & telegraph office, residential accommodation – post master's house/quarters

Sandgate Post Office is a heritage-listed former post office at 1 Bowser Parade, Sandgate, City of Brisbane, Queensland, Australia. It was designed in the office of the Queensland Colonial Architect and built from 1886 to 1887. It is also known as Sandgate Post and Telegraph Office. It was added to the Queensland Heritage Register on 7 February 2005.

== History ==
The two-storeyed Sandgate Post and Telegraph Office was erected in 1886–7 to a design prepared in the office of the Queensland Colonial Architect.

A post office had operated at Sandgate since 1864, on Eagle Terrace near Palm Avenue. In the early 1880s a new site in Bowser Parade, closer to the railway line that had reached Sandgate in 1882, was purchased for £800.

In June 1885 the Post and Telegraph Department requested that the Department of Public Works prepare plans for a new post and telegraph office building for Sandgate, to cost no more than £2,000. It is likely that the design was produced under the supervision of John James Clark, Colonial Architect from 1883 to 1885. Tenders were called in March and April 1886, but the design proved too expensive.

Fresh plans were prepared under the supervision of Clark's successor, George St Paul Connolly, Queensland's first locally born and trained Colonial Architect (1886–1891). These plans were further amended to reduce costs and tenders were called in June–July 1886. A contract was let to local Sandgate builder William Street, with a price of £2,025. It is thought that the bricks for the construction were supplied from Leopold Fiedler's brickworks in Roghan Road, Zillmere, beside Cabbage Tree Creek.

The new post and telegraph building, uncommonly substantial for what later became a suburban office, reflected government confidence in the booming economy and the importance of Sandgate both as a popular seaside resort and, increasingly, as a residential commuter district. Sandgate had its own local government (Borough of Sandgate) at that period and was not officially a "suburb" of Brisbane until the establishment of Greater Brisbane on 1 October 1925, but the railway enabled residents of Sandgate to commute daily to work in Brisbane.

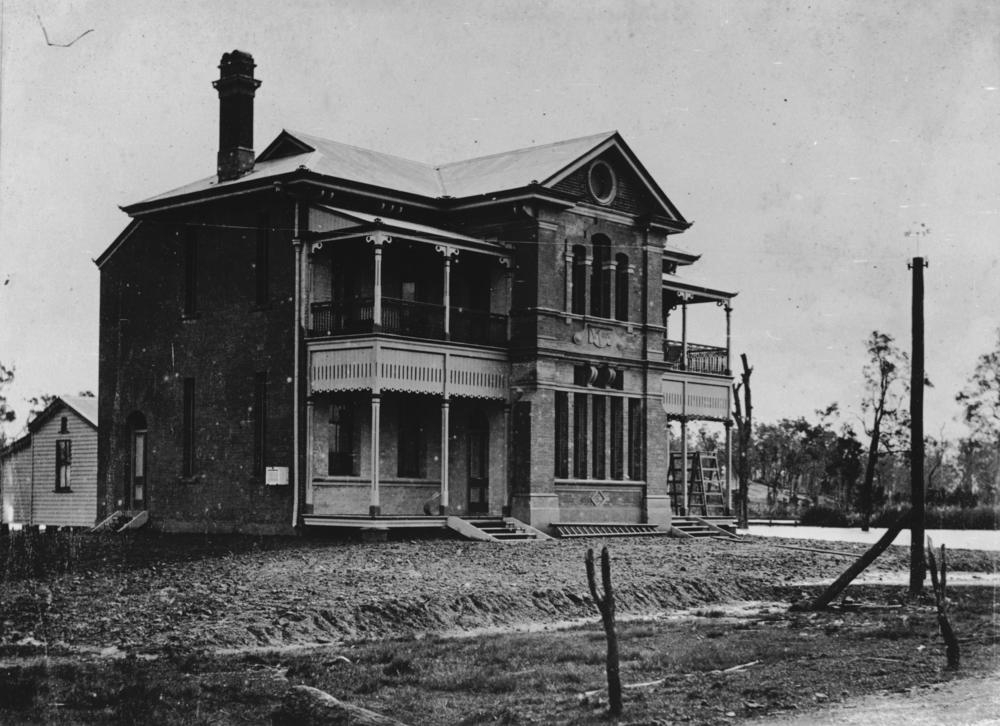
Sandgate Post Office in final stages of construction, circa 1887

The building opened as a post and telegraph office on 7 May 1887, with residential accommodation for the postmaster on the first floor, a dining room, post and telegraph offices and public area on the ground floor and a detached service wing housing kitchen, servant's quarters and wash house. The exterior brickwork was colour-washed originally, but has been painted since 1894.

The layout was innovative, the central public area with an entrance porch either side becoming a principal feature of late 19th and early 20th century Queensland post offices. Along with post and telegraph offices constructed at the important commercial centres of Fortitude Valley (1887) and South Brisbane (1889–1890) it was one of only three substantial, two-storeyed brick post offices constructed in metropolitan Brisbane in the late 19th century. The Woolloongabba Post Office, also a substantial two-storeyed brick building, was erected in 1905. It was designed by the Queensland Government Architect's office for the Australian Government, which had assumed responsibility for post and telegraph communication following the federation of the Australian colonies on 1 January 1901.

A telephone service was established in the Sandgate Post and Telegraph Office in 1898 and a telephone exchange was installed in 1907. The exchange was removed to a new building c. 1959.

After the second world war the first floor verandahs were enclosed with fibrous cement sheeting and casement windows and from 1981 the upper floor was used for office purposes.

The exterior was restored in 1983–1984 and the interior was refurbished in time for centenary celebrations of the 1887 opening.

The building continued to function as a post office until c. 2004, when it was sold to private enterprise. Its renovated exterior continues to make a substantial contribution to the townscape of central Sandgate.

The building was operated as the 4017 Bar and Grill for a number of years, taking its name "4017" from the postcode for Sandgate. However, by 2014, it was under new management and renamed the Chandelier Bar & Restaurant.

== Description ==
The former Sandgate Post and Telegraph Office is a rectangular, two-storeyed painted brick building with Italian Renaissance stylistic elements. It rests on concrete foundations and has a hipped roof of corrugated iron with acroteria and gablets at either end.

Dominating the front elevation is a projecting gabled portico, with the words Sandgate Post Office in low-relief beneath the first floor windows. Originally this read "VR 1887", VR being the royal cypher of Queen Victoria, in whose reign the building was constructed.

Front verandahs to either side of the portico are ornamented with chamfered timber posts, a timber frieze on the lower level and fretwork brackets and cast-iron balustrading on the upper floor. These details were recreated in the 1983–1984 restoration to as close to the original as possible. A double rear verandah with formerly the same detailing, remains enclosed.

The interior has been modified and refurbished.

The detached timber service wing to the rear remains, but has been altered substantially.

Also at the rear are two later, single-storeyed brick additions. One is an attached extension constructed c. 1907 to house the telephone exchange. The other is a more recent, detached, rectangular building which served as a postal depot. It appears to have been erected in the 1980s following re-subdivision of the site in 1978 and replaces a longer timber building extant by 1953.

Both additions employ rooflines and exterior finishes similar to those of the 1886–1887 building.

The former Sandgate Post and Telegraph Office stands isolated on the corner of Bowser Parade and Rainbow Street and dominates the vista west along Eagle Terrace and Seymour Street. It forms part of an historical grouping that includes the adjacent Sandgate war memorial and the nearby former Sandgate Town Hall.

== Heritage listing ==
Sandgate Post Office was listed on the Queensland Heritage Register on 7 February 2005 having satisfied the following criteria.

The place is important in demonstrating the evolution or pattern of Queensland's history.

The former Sandgate Post Office, erected in 1886–1887 as a post and telegraph office, is important in demonstrating the pattern and evolution of Queensland's history. The building survives as an expression of government "boom" era confidence; of the popularity of Sandgate as both a seaside resort and as a commuter residential district from the 1880s; and of the important role of the post and telegraph services in the Queensland community and economy at this period.

The place is important in demonstrating the principal characteristics of a particular class of cultural places.

The building is a substantial former post and telegraph office of a type more usually found in regional centres. It remains substantially intact and is important in demonstrating the principal characteristics of its class of cultural places: two-storeyed late 19th century brick post and telegraph offices. These characteristics include: the form (two-storeyed), materials (brick), planning (upstairs residence for the postmaster and downstairs offices including a large central public space with two entrances) and design (classical motifs and detailing).

The place is important because of its aesthetic significance.

The place is significant for its landmark quality, intactness and contribution to the Sandgate townscape. Located in the centre of the Sandgate commercial precinct, the place contributes to an historical grouping that includes the adjacent war memorial and the nearby former Sandgate Town Hall.

The place is important in demonstrating a high degree of creative or technical achievement at a particular period.

The place is important for having established a precedent for subsequent late 19th century and early 20th century Queensland post and telegraph office layouts, demonstrating creative achievement.
