= Jean Broadhurst =

American bacteriologist

Jean Alice Broadhurst
- Born: 29 December 1873; Stockton, New Jersey
- Died: 4 September 1954 (aged 80)
- Education: Columbia University (B.S. 1903, A.M. 1908), Cornell University (Ph.D. 1914)
- Known for: detecting the measles virus
- Scientific career
- Fields: botany, bacteriology
- Workplaces: New Jersey State Normal School, Barnard College, Teachers College, Columbia University

Jean Alice Broadhurst (29 December 1873 – 4 September 1954) was an American educator, botanist and bacteriologist, known for her work in detecting the measles virus.

== Career ==
Broadhurst graduated from New Jersey State Normal School in 1892; thereafter joining the school's faculty. She studied at Teachers College, Columbia University in New York City; taught in the department of botany and zoology at Barnard College; and in 1906 joined the Teachers College, Columbia University faculty. Broadhurst earned her Ph.D. from Cornell University in 1914, and retired as emerita professor at Teachers College, Columbia University in 1939.

== Measles detection ==
In November 1937, after more than a year of research, Broadhurst announced the discovery of a method of detecting the measles virus before the appearance of the characteristic rash. Utilising the dye nigrosin, Broadhurst and her team succeeded in staining and therefore making visible the inclusion bodies in the virus. Nose and throat specimens from over 160 measles cases were used in the study, which was described in The Journal of Infectious Diseases.

== Sources ==
- Ogilvie, Marilyn; Harvey, Joy, eds. (2000). The Biographical Dictionary of Women in Science: Pioneering Lives From Ancient Times to the Mid-20th Century. Vol. A–K. Routledge. p. 370. ISBN 0-415-92038-8.
