= Edward Broadhurst (politician) =

English-born barrister and politician

Edward Broadhurst QC (2 July 1810 – 7 April 1883) was an English-born barrister and politician in colonial New South Wales.

== Personal life ==
He was born at Bath to the Reverend Thomas Broadhurst and Frances Whittaker. He studied at the University of Cambridge and in 1837 became a barrister. Later that year he migrated to New South Wales, and soon had a successful legal practice. On 7 May 1853 he married Harriett Lucy née Greenhill, with whom he had two children.

He was an appointed member of the New South Wales Legislative Council from 1851 to 1856, and was appointed to the reconstituted Council from 1856 to 1861. He was appointed Queen's Counsel on 17 August 1858, the fifth barrister in New South Wales to be appointed.

Broadhurst died after some years of ill health in Sydney on 7 April 1883 (aged 72).
