= Town of Sandgate =

Locality in Queensland, Australia

Coordinates: 27°19′14″S 153°4′13″E

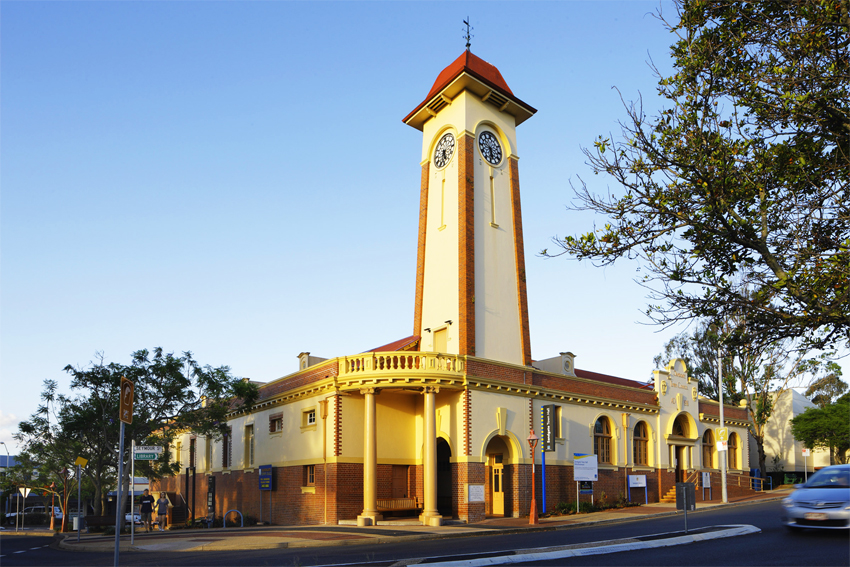
Sandgate Town Hall, 2012

The Town of Sandgate is a former local government area of Queensland, Australia, located in northern Brisbane adjacent to Moreton Bay.

== History ==
Land in Sandgate became available in 1853, allowing a small seaside settlement to develop. By 1874, coach services connected Sandgate to Brisbane. The railway line from Brisbane to Sandgate opened in 1882.

On 29 April 1880, Sandgate was proclaimed a municipality known as the Borough of Sandgate.

The Local Authorities Act 1902 replaced all Divisions and Boroughs with Towns and Shires, creating the Town of Sandgate on 31 March 1903.

On 1 October 1925, it was amalgamated into the City of Brisbane.

From its first settlement Sandgate relied on inadequate water supplies from tanks and the local lagoons. Many investigations into better water supplies were carried out over the years, but it was not until November, 1921, that Sandgate was connected to the Brisbane water supply system. At the official opening, the Minister for Works, Mr. W. Forgan Smith, described this as "a historic occasion."

== Sandgate Town Hall ==
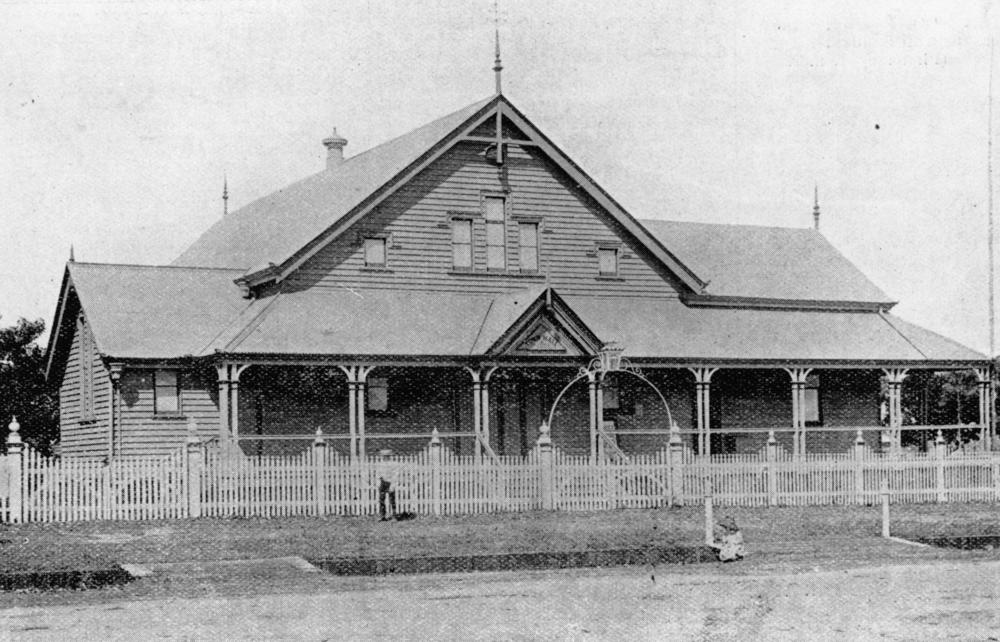
The original Sandgate Town Hall, Brisbane, 1901

The original Sandgate Town Hall was designed by Richard Gailey and built in 1882 at Kate Street, Shorncliffe but burned down on 24 May 1910.

Its replacement was built in 1911–1912 at 5 Brighton Street, Sandgate to be closer to the Sandgate railway station and the Sandgate Post Office. After the amalgamation into City of Brisbane, the Sandgate Town Hall was used as a library, School of Arts and a health clinic. Today it is used as meeting rooms available for use by community groups.

The Sandgate Town Hall was listed on the Queensland Heritage Register in 2005.

== Mayors ==
From the inception of the Town Council the elected aldermen chose one of their number to be mayor for the ensuing year. This changed in 1921 when the mayor was elected directly by the voters from a separate list of mayoral candidates. In 1924 the procedure was changed again, and the aldermanic candidate receiving the most votes became mayor.

- 1880–1881: Edward Barton Southerden
- 1882–1884: William Deagon
- 1885: William John Farmer Cooksley
- 1886: Samuel Maxwell
- 1887–1888: Hiram Wakefield
- 1889: Thomas Lefroy Holmes
- 1890: Joseph Darragh
- 1891: Walter Barrett
- 1892: Roger Hale Sheaffe
- 1893: Martin Quinlan
- 1894: John Aloysius Hayes
- 1895: George Tyrer Lightbody
- 1896: Alfred William Field
- 1897: Frederick William Ball Mann
- 1898–1899: William Henry Bell
- 1900: Thomas Lee
- 1901: Thomas Strong
- 1902: George Staeheli
- 1903: John Aloysius Hayes
- 1904–1905: William Henry Bell
- 1906: John Edward Selves Plumridge
- 1907: John Gilpin
- 1908: John Lunn
- 1909: Albert Henry William Clarkson
- 1910–1911: Frank Gowen
- 1912: John Gilpin
- 1913: Charles Douglas Ferguson
- 1914–1915: John Lunn
- 1916: Edward E. Quinlan
- 1917–1919: William Henry Bowser
- 1920–1921: James John Dalton
- 1921–1923: William Henry Bowser
- 1924–1925: Ernest William Smith
