= Sandgate, Queensland =

Sandgate
- Suburb
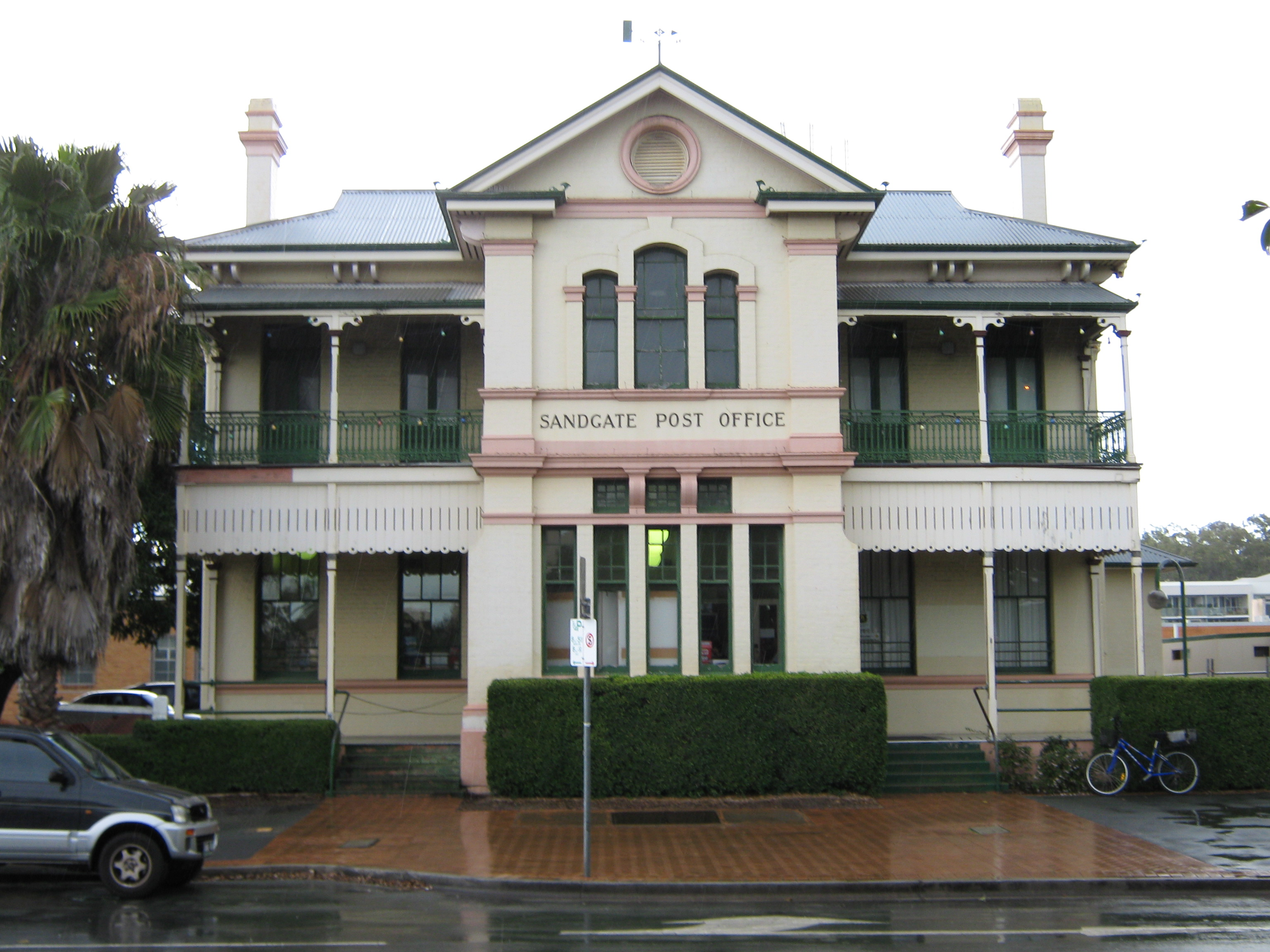
- Former Sandgate post office (now The Sandgate Post Office Hotel)

- Coordinates: 27.3167°S 153.0641°E
- Country: Australia
- State: Queensland
- City: Brisbane
- LGA: City of Brisbane (Deagon Ward)
- Location: 20.5 km (12.7 mi) NNE of Brisbane CBD
- Established: 1853

Government
  - State electorate: Sandgate
  - Federal division: Lilley

Area
  - Total: 3.9 km^{2} (1.5 sq mi)

Population
  - Total: 4,926 (2021 census)
  - Density: 1,263/km^{2} (3,270/sq mi)
- Time zone: UTC+10:00 (AEST)
- Postcode: 4017
Suburbs around Sandgate
Bracken Ridge	Brighton	Moreton Bay
Bracken Ridge	Sandgate	Moreton Bay
Deagon	Boondall	Shorncliffe

Sandgate is a northern coastal suburb in the City of Brisbane, Queensland, Australia. In the 2021 census, Sandgate had a population of 4,926 people.

The town became a popular destination for the people of Brisbane in the early 20th century and remains popular due to its coastline, including Lovers Walk along the bay between Sandgate and neighbouring Shorncliffe as well as Moora Park and Beach.

== Geography ==
Sandgate is situated on the coastline, along Bramble Bay part of Moreton Bay. The western border of the suburb is marked by the Gateway Motorway.

The Shorncliffe railway line (part of the Queensland Rail City network) enters the suburb from the south-west (Deagon) and exits to the south (Shorncliffe) with Sandgate railway station in Chubb Street off Rainbow Street (27.3222°S 153.0695°E) serving the suburb.

The Deagon Wetlands are in the west of the suburb (27.3156°S 153.0520°E); they are part of the North East Wetlands of Brisbane.

Dowse Lagoon is in the centre of the suburb (27.3166°S 153.0666°E). It was officially named on 15 November 1975 after Thomas Dowse who settled in the Sandgate area in 1853. Einbunpin Lagoon is a smaller lagoon to the south-east of Dowse Lagoon (27.3193°S 153.0677°E).

== History ==
The Turrbul people inhabited the seashore, the creeks and lagoons from Nudgee Beach to the Pine River. They were a branch of the clan of the Yugarabul speaking people. This larger clan inhabited the area from North Brisbane and along the coastline of Nudgee, Sandgate to Caboolture. In their language the local Turrbal clan called their coastal land "Warra" meaning "an open sheet of water". This land is now called Shorncliffe, Sandgate and Brighton. Their existence depended upon their knowledge of the seasons and their surroundings. Spears, nullas and boomerangs were used in hunting and woven nets for fishing.

The British settlers originally called the area Cabbage Tree Creek (after the creek).

The town was named Sandgate by James Burnett, an early surveyor in the region after the seaside town of Sandgate in Kent, England. Sandgate in Kent had a military camp, Shorncliffe Camp, on top of the cliffs adjacent to it. Sandgate in Brisbane has an adjacent suburb called Shorncliffe named after the camp in Kent, again by Burnett, after the similarity of the cliffs.

Land in Sandgate became available on 9 November 1853, allowing a small seaside settlement to develop. One of the first structures built at Sandgate was a Native Police barracks, from where officers such as the Frederick Wheeler conducted punitive raids against local aboriginals.

On 25 May 1872, Robert Travers Atkin, a Member of the Queensland Legislative Assembly, died at Sandgate following an illness of some months. At his request, he was buried in Sandgate on the crest of the rise on which he had enjoyed sitting under the shade of the trees and looking out onto Moreton Bay. His will provided £50 to build a church beside his grave. This church was the first St Margaret's church (and is now used as the rectory). A monument was erected to his memory by the members of the Hibernian Society of Queensland, of which he was vice-president.

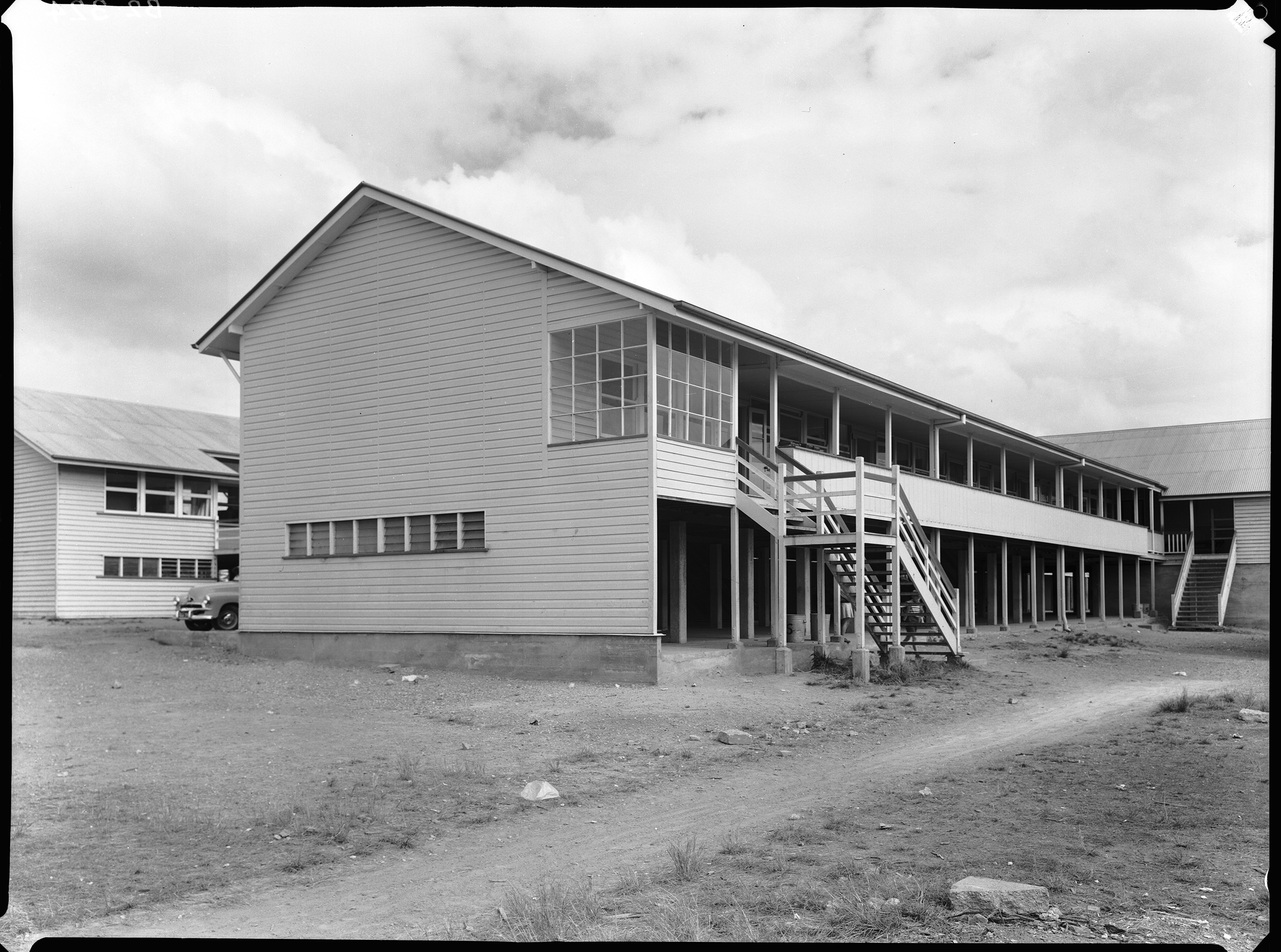
Sandgate State School, 1956

In August 1873, a public meeting was held to establish a school. There were about 50 school-age children in Sandgate and nearly £70 was donated towards the establishment of a school. Sandgate State School opened on 15 September 1873 under teacher William R. Barfoot in the chapel of the first Baptist Church in Loudon Street (not to be confused with the Sandgate Baptist Church in Flinders Street which opened in 1887). The first permanent school building opened in 1874.

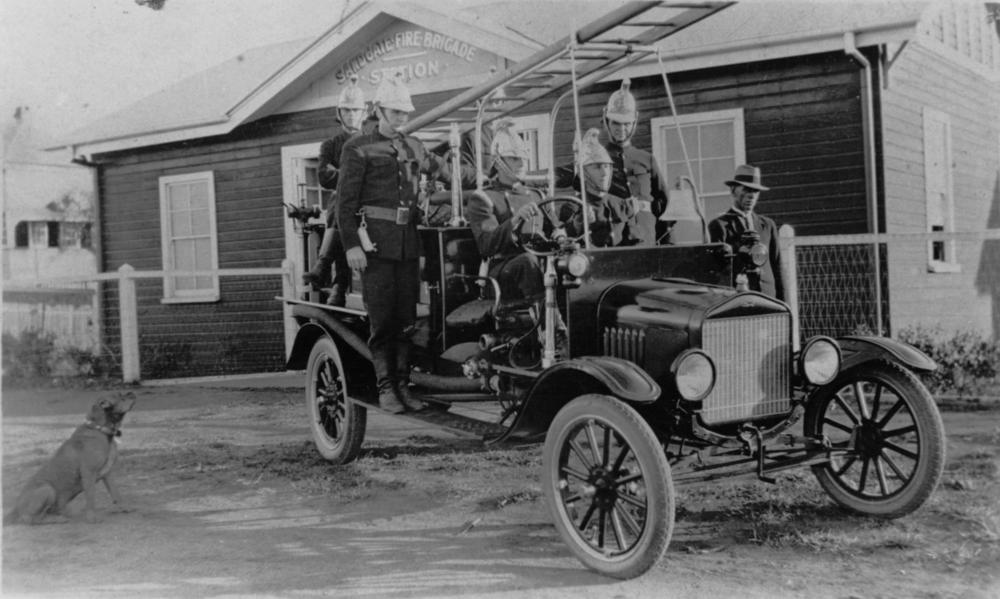
Sandgate Fire Brigade outside the fire station in 1923

By 1874, coach services connected Sandgate to Brisbane.

In December 1879, allotments in the Town of Sandgate were auctioned by John Cameron. A map advertising the auction states the land available was subdivisions 1 to 14, of allotments 8, 9, 10 and part of 7, Sec. 3, Town of Sandgate. The map shows allotments bordered by Friday, Yundah and Kate Streets, now in Shorncliffe.

In January 1880, a plan of subdivisions 1 to 32 of Portion 73, Town of Sandgate, was advertised for sale, with interested persons to apply to William Potts, Queen Street, Brisbane. The map advertising the sale includes the location of the proposed railway terminus, and situates the proposed subdivisions between a lagoon and the esplanade. Newspaper advertisements describe the proposed subdivisions as "choice marine villa sites".

On 29 April 1880, Sandgate was proclaimed a municipality known as the Borough of Sandgate. The Local Authorities Act 1902 replaced all Divisions and Boroughs with Towns and Shires, creating the Town of Sandgate on 31 March 1903. This new status meant a town council was formed to guide the development of the local area. Initially, the council chambers were located in Shorncliffe. However, following a fire which destroyed the council chambers in 1910, a much larger town hall was opened in 1911. The Sandgate Town Hall was extensively renovated in 2011 to mark the 100th anniversary of the hall. The Sandgate Town Council, which operated from 1880 to 1925, had to provide a range of services for the growing community. These included a fire department, ambulance, and sanitation facilities, as well as maintaining roads and regulating local development. In October 1925 the Town of Sandgate was amalgamated into the City of Brisbane.

A Church of England was built in Signal Row on the corner of Yundah Street (27.3234°S 153.0806°E), then the centre of the developing town. It was opened and dedicated on Sunday 12 December 1880 by Bishop Matthew Hale. It was a timber church 35 by 20 feet (10.7 by 6.1 m) and able to accommodate 150 people. It was designed by architect FDG Stanley and built by contractors Woodward and Betts of Brisbane. In September 1886 it was announced that it would be dedicated to St Nicolas, the patron saint of sailors and sea-farers, a common practice in seaside towns. In 1887 it was enlarged which involved re-orienting the building on the block so the chancel was to the south rather than to the original east. In 1930 the undercroft was enclosed with bricks to form a church wall. The church closed in 1988. The Queensland Government purchased the church and incorporated it into Shorncliffe State School but subsequently demolished it due to extensive termite damage. Its stained glass windows were preserved and are now in St Margaret's Anglican Church.

The first Catholic Church was opened on 25 September 1881. It was a small brick building which remains in use as the office of the Sacred Heart Primary School.

The coming of the railway in 1882 promoted more rapid development of the Sandgate area. Travel to Brisbane by train could be completed in less than half an hour.

On 12 August 1882 the Garden Estate, Sandgate was advertised for auction by James R. Dickson. An estate map shows the 61 blocks making up the estate at the area bounded by Rainbow and Friday Streets.

The Sandgate Baptist church opened on the corner of Cliff Street and Flinders Parade in 1887. It has since undergone multiple restorations, yet has continued to remain in its original structure. It is no longer operating as a church, being now used as a child care centre.

On Sunday 25 September 1892, the new Sacred Heart Catholic Church was opened and blessed by Cardinal Francis Moran assisted by Archibshop of Brisbane Robert Dunne. The former church building was to be used to establish a school.

Sacred Heart Catholic School opened on Monday 23 January 1893 in the former church. It opened with an initial enrolment of 50 students was operated by three Sisters of Mercy from the All Hallows' Convent in Fortitude Valley. The first principal was Sister Mary Borgia. The school also provided boarding facilities for some years. A purpose-built school building was constructed in 1920. The school provided secondary education until 1980 when St John Fisher College opened in neighbouring Bracken Ridge. In 1995 principal Sister Mary O'Donoghue retired and Glenda Honan was appointed as the first lay principal.

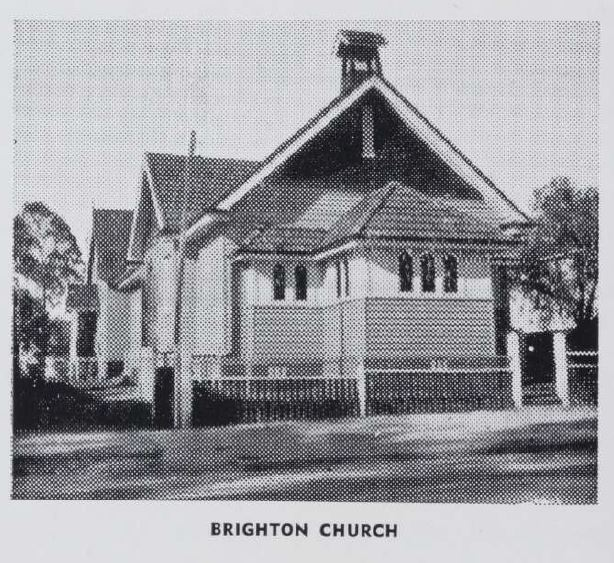
Brighton Methodist Church, circa 1947

Land for a Methodist church was purchased in Brighton in 1914. In January 1917, a small Sunday school was opened on the site. In 1919, a Methodist church building was relocated from Killarney (where it had opened in 1902) to the Brighton site, where it was erected and officially opened on Saturday 5 June 1920. On Saturday 2 December 1939, 500 people attended the opening of a new church building by Reverend F. A. Malcolm, the President of the Methodist Conference. The previous church was relocated to the rear of the site to be used as a Sunday school hall. In 1977, the church joined in the amalgamation that created the Uniting Church in Australia becoming the Brighton Uniting Church. The church at 41 Deagon Street (27.3136°S 153.0628°E) was closed circa 1999, and was later sold and the church and hall (the former church) were converted into a house. It is now within the suburb boundaries of Sandgate. It is listed on the Brisbane Heritage Register.

On 27 December 1920, 33 building sites in the Nashville Heights Estate were advertised for auction by Lyons & Coaldrake. A map showing the allotments, which are in the area currently bounded by Alexandra Street, Nash Street, Darling Street and Borella Street, notes the blocks' proximity to the Sandgate Central Station, beach, state school and post office.

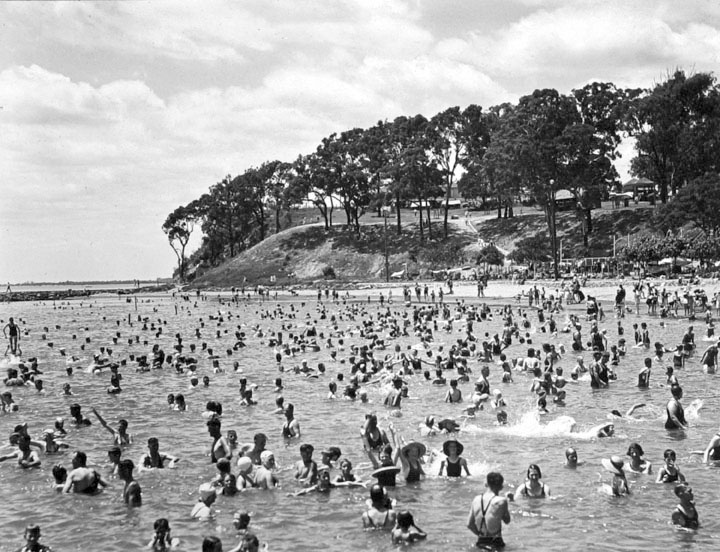
Swimming at Moora park in 1937

Sandgate boasted clean beaches that were a popular weekend destination, with thousands of people visiting from Brisbane to escape the heat. Boating, swimming and golf were the most common sporting activities. Moora Park (27.3243°S 153.0849°E) was the location for dances and open-air films.

Sandgate Library opened in 1952 with a major refurbishment in 1996.

The Sandgate Little Theatre Group was established in 1958. They perform in the Sandgate Town Hall. Now known as Sandgate Theatre Incorporated, this community theatre group hosts Brisbane's longest running community theatre festival, the Yarrageh Drama Festival, which is held in August and September each year at the town hall.

Sandgate Infants State School was separated from Sandgate State School in 1955. It was amalgamated back into Sandgate State School in 1971.

Sandgate District State High School opened on 26 January 1959. Due to delays in the construction of the first school building, the first classes were taught in the Sandgate Town Hall.

Sandgate Opportunity School opened on 26 April 1960. It was later renamed Sandgate Special School. It closed on 15 December 1995.

In June 1990, the Uniting Church in Australia congregations of Boondall, Brighton, Sandgate and Shorncliffe decided to amalgamate. Their new Sandgate Uniting Church in Deagon was opened in Sunday 20 November 1994.

== Demographics ==
In the 2011 census, Sandgate had a population of 4,626 people, 51.4% female and 48.6% male. The median age of the Sandgate population was 43 years, 6 years above the Australian median. 77.8% of people living in Sandgate were born in Australia, compared to the national average of 69.8%; the next most common countries of birth were England 5.9%, New Zealand 3.7%, Scotland 0.8%, Ireland 0.6%, Philippines 0.5%. 92.1% of people spoke only English at home; the next most common languages were 0.5% German, 0.5% Japanese, 0.4% French, 0.3% Filipino, 0.3% Italian.

In the 2016 census, Sandgate had a population of 4,909 people.

In the 2021 census, Sandgate had a population of 4,926 people.

== Heritage listings ==
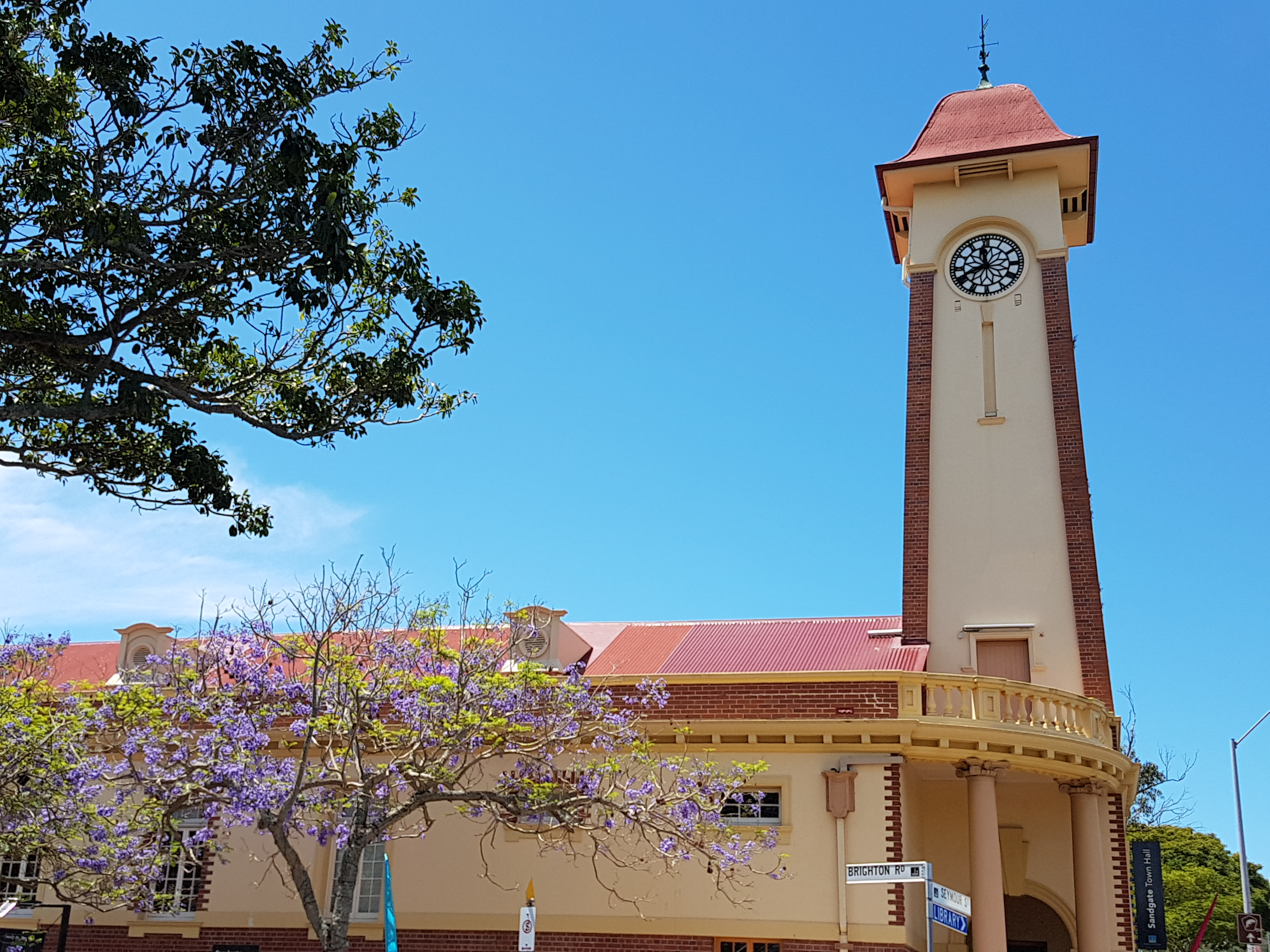
Sandgate Town Hall

Sandgate has a number of heritage-listed sites, including:

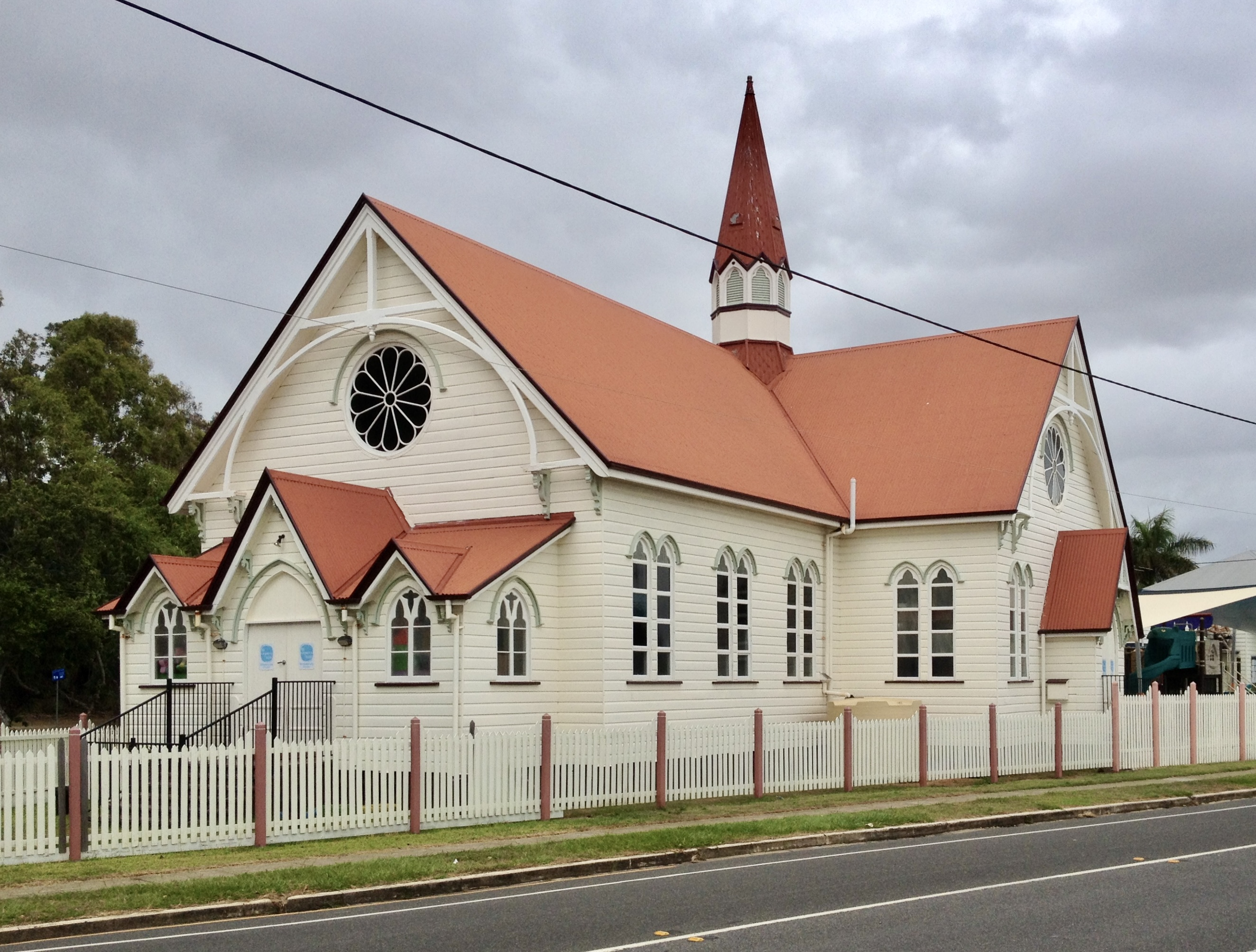
Former Sandgate Baptist Church

- 1 Bowser Parade (27.321°S 153.069°E): former Sandgate Post Office
- 5 Brighton Road (27.3206°S 153.0705°E): former Sandgate Town Hall
- 92 Brighton Road (27.3169°S 153.0668°E): Sacred Heart Catholic Church Precinct
- 6–8 Flinders Parade (27.3202°S 153.0743°E): former Sandgate Baptist Church
- 8 Seymour Street (27.3206°S 153.0698°E): Sandgate War Memorial Park
- 138 Flinders Parade (27.3155°S 153.0698°E): Broadhurst, Sandgate

== Education ==
Sandgate State School is a government primary (Prep–6) school for boys and girls at 54 Rainbow Street (27.3208°S 153.0658°E). In 2018, the school had an enrolment of 479 students with 34 teachers (30 full-time equivalent) and 20 non-teaching staff (15 full-time equivalent). It includes a special education program.

Sacred Heart Primary School is a Catholic primary (Prep–6) school for boys and girls at 92 Brighton Road (27.3174°S 153.0671°E). In 2018, the school had an enrolment of 215 students with 21 teachers (17 full-time equivalent) and 11 non-teaching staff (6 full-time equivalent).

There are no secondary schools in Sandgate. The nearest government secondary schools are Sandgate District State High School in neighbouring Deagon to the south-west and Bracken Ridge State High School in neighbouring Bracken Ridge to the north-west.

== Amenities ==
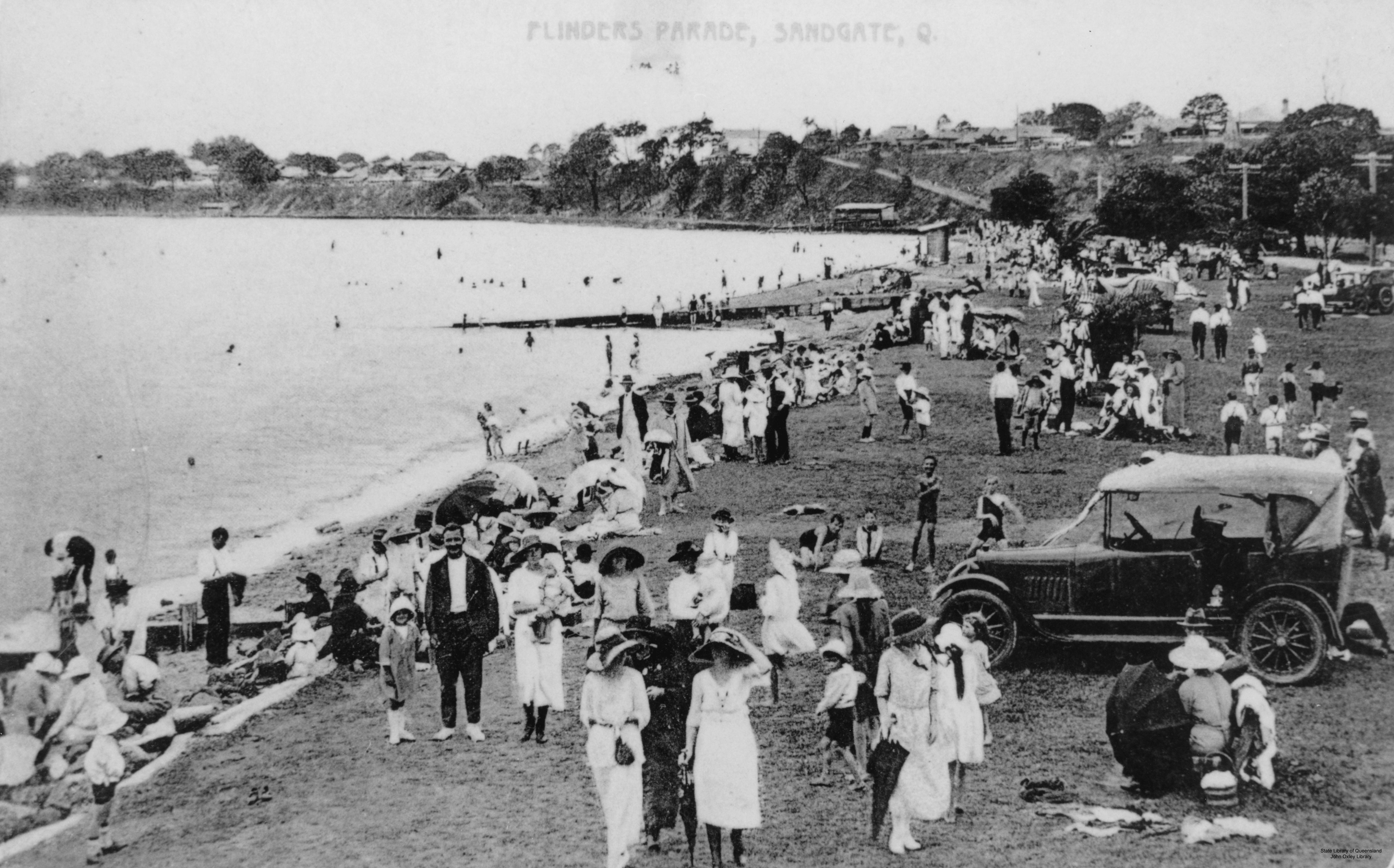
Holidaymakers at Sandgate, ca. 1920 to 1930

Most of Sandgate's facilities are located along Brighton Road, the main street in Sandgate, which include numerous banks, shops, services and a small shopping centre anchored by a Woolworths supermarket. Woolworths previously traded adjacent to the site of the centre until the opening of the new store in February 2009. The old Woolworths site has been redeveloped as an Aldi supermarket, opened in December 2013. The Sandgate railway station is a short walk from these facilities.

In 2009, the Sandgate Post Office was relocated to other premises and the heritage-listed building was sold. It was subsequently renovated and is now operating as the 4017 Bar & Grill (4017 being the postcode for Sandgate).

The Brisbane City Council operates a public library at 1 Seymour Street.

Despite its name, Sandgate Uniting Church is at 116 Board Street in neighbouring Deagon.

Recreational facilities in Sandgate include numerous parks, walking and bike tracks, and a municipal swimming pool on Flinders Parade.

== Sport ==
The Sandgate Golf Club is located in Allpass Parade, Shorncliffe.

A number of sports teams represent the local area, including the Sandgate-Redcliffe Gators and Sandgate Football Club.

The Police and Citizens Youth Club (PCYC) is located next to playing fields at the western end of Kempster Street. It runs regular Blue Light Discos and other social events, and is a centre for gymnastics, martial arts training and other sports.

Operating out of the PCYC is the Shorncliffe Pottery Club which started in nearby Shorncliffe over 30 years ago, and after some years at Sandgate Town Hall relocated to the PCYC.

== Events ==
The Brisbane to Gladstone Yacht Race starts from Shorncliffe Pier every Easter. It is the highlight of the popular Bluewater Festival of arts and cultural events held throughout the district.

The Shorncliffe Pottery Club holds an annual exhibition named Expressions at Sandgate Town Hall each October, as well as participating with other local arts organisations, such as Sandgate Art Society (SasArt) and the Deagon-based Artrageous, in staging other art and culture events, including those which are part of the Bluewater Festival in the week before Easter each year.

== Attractions ==
The Sandgate & District Historical Society & Museum is at 150 Rainbow Street (27.3218°S 153.0722°E) in a building that was formerly Mohoupts' General Store and a local funeral business.
