= Electoral results for the district of Broadwater =

Queensland, Australia, district election results

This is a list of electoral results for the electoral district of Broadwater in Queensland state elections.

== Members for Broadwater ==
Member	Party	Term
Allan Grice	National	1992–2001
Peta-Kaye Croft	Labor	2001–2012
Verity Barton	Liberal National	2012–2017
David Crisafulli	Liberal National	2017–present

== Election results ==
=== Elections in the 2020s ===
2024 Queensland state election: Broadwater
Party	Candidate	Votes	%	±%
Liberal National	David Crisafulli	20,916	63.99	+4.40
Labor	Tamika Hicks	7,022	21.48	−5.05
One Nation	Steven Whitehead	2,244	6.87	+0.94
Greens	Simon Margan	1,615	4.94	−0.28
Family First	Peter Edwards	889	2.72	+2.72
Total formal votes		32,686	96.70	−0.09
Informal votes		1,114	3.30	+0.09
Turnout		33,800	88.42	−0.73
Two-party-preferred result
Liberal National	David Crisafulli	23,311	71.32	+4.75
Labor	Tamika Hicks	9,375	28.68	−4.75
Liberal National hold		Swing	+4.75	

2020 Queensland state election: Broadwater
Party	Candidate	Votes	%	±%
Liberal National	David Crisafulli	18,059	59.59	+11.11
Labor	Maureen Simpson	8,041	26.53	+3.27
One Nation	Jesse Schneider	1,796	5.93	−15.48
Greens	April Broadbent	1,583	5.22	−1.63
United Australia	Mara Krischker	441	1.46	+1.46
Informed Medical Options	Natalie O'Donnell	386	1.27	+1.27
Total formal votes		30,306	96.79	+0.59
Informal votes		1,004	3.21	−0.59
Turnout		31,310	89.15	+2.78
Two-party-preferred result
Liberal National	David Crisafulli	20,174	66.57	−1.41
Labor	Maureen Simpson	10,132	33.43	+1.41
Liberal National hold		Swing	−1.41	

=== Elections in the 2010s ===
2017 Queensland state election: Broadwater
Party	Candidate	Votes	%	±%
Liberal National	David Crisafulli	13,499	48.5	−8.5
Labor	Peter Flori	6,477	23.3	−1.5
One Nation	Brenden Ball	5,959	21.4	+18.6
Greens	Daniel Kwon	1,908	6.9	+1.1
Total formal votes		27,843	96.2	−1.6
Informal votes		1,100	3.8	+1.6
Turnout		28,943	86.4	+7.1
Two-party-preferred result
Liberal National	David Crisafulli	18,928	68.0	+1.70
Labor	Peter Flori	8,915	32.0	−1.70
Liberal National hold		Swing	+1.70	

2015 Queensland state election: Broadwater
Party	Candidate	Votes	%	±%
Liberal National	Verity Barton	13,537	47.46	−3.84
Labor	Penny Toland	8,844	31.01	−0.64
Greens	Daniel Kwon	2,145	7.52	+4.31
Palmer United	Gueorgui Sokolov	1,696	5.95	+5.95
One Nation	Phil Pollock	1,061	3.72	+3.72
Family First	Stuart Ballantyne	988	3.46	+1.63
Independent	Amin-Reza Javanmard	252	0.88	+0.88
Total formal votes		28,523	97.44	−0.27
Informal votes		748	2.56	+0.27
Turnout		29,271	86.62	−1.95
Two-party-preferred result
Liberal National	Verity Barton	14,544	57.19	−4.10
Labor	Penny Toland	10,885	42.81	+4.10
Liberal National hold		Swing	−4.10	

2012 Queensland state election: Broadwater
Party	Candidate	Votes	%	±%
Liberal National	Verity Barton	13,583	51.30	+7.37
Labor	Peta-Kaye Croft	8,378	31.64	−15.17
Katter's Australian	Peter McCambridge	1,408	5.32	+5.32
Independent	Ron Clarke	1,219	4.60	+4.60
Greens	James Brydges	851	3.21	−1.78
Independent	Liz Pforr	552	2.08	+2.08
Family First	Ben O'Brien	485	1.83	+1.83
Total formal votes		26,476	97.71	−0.13
Informal votes		620	2.29	+0.13
Turnout		27,096	88.57	−0.09
Two-party-preferred result
Liberal National	Verity Barton	14,513	61.29	+13.32
Labor	Peta-Kaye Croft	9,167	38.71	−13.32
Liberal National gain from Labor		Swing	+13.32	

=== Elections in the 2000s ===
2009 Queensland state election: Broadwater
Party	Candidate	Votes	%	±%
Labor	Peta-Kaye Croft	12,090	46.8	−5.5
Liberal National	Richard Towson	11,345	43.9	+3.9
Greens	Graeme Maizey	1,289	5.0	−0.3
DS4SEQ	Ben Monaghan	646	2.5	+2.5
Independent	Rohan Turnley	458	1.8	+1.8
Total formal votes		25,828	97.7	
Informal votes		562	2.3	
Turnout		26,390	88.7	
Two-party-preferred result
Labor	Peta-Kaye Croft	12,829	52.0	−4.6
Liberal National	Richard Towson	11,829	48.0	+4.6
Labor hold		Swing	−4.6	

2006 Queensland state election: Broadwater
Party	Candidate	Votes	%	±%
Labor	Peta-Kaye Croft	13,442	51.2	+1.9
Liberal	John Caris	10,926	41.6	+41.6
Greens	Julie-Ann Teluk	1,284	4.9	+0.6
One Nation	Lesley Pocock	437	1.7	−3.4
Independent	Maurie Carroll	184	0.7	+0.7
Total formal votes		26,273	97.9	−0.2
Informal votes		571	2.1	+0.2
Turnout		26,844	88.1	−0.8
Two-party-preferred result
Labor	Peta-Kaye Croft	13,898	55.2	+1.1
Liberal	John Caris	11,277	44.8	+44.8
Labor hold		Swing	+1.1	

2004 Queensland state election: Broadwater
Party	Candidate	Votes	%	±%
Labor	Peta-Kaye Croft	12,493	49.3	−3.1
National	Margaret Grummitt	10,474	41.3	−6.3
One Nation	Peter Elliott	1,284	5.1	+5.1
Greens	Dean Hepburn	1,090	4.3	+4.3
Total formal votes		25,341	98.1	+2.5
Informal votes		498	1.9	−2.5
Turnout		25,839	88.9	−1.7
Two-party-preferred result
Labor	Peta-Kaye Croft	13,061	54.1	+1.7
National	Margaret Grummitt	11,099	45.9	−1.7
Labor hold		Swing	+1.7	

2001 Queensland state election: Broadwater
Party	Candidate	Votes	%	±%
Labor	Peta-Kaye Croft	12,388	52.4	+23.2
National	Allan Grice	11,231	47.6	+7.3
Total formal votes		23,619	95.6	
Informal votes		1,092	4.4	
Turnout		24,711	90.6	
Labor gain from National		Swing	+13.1	

=== Elections in the 1990s ===
1998 Queensland state election: Broadwater
Party	Candidate	Votes	%	±%
National	Allan Grice	8,756	39.5	−21.7
Labor	Bob Brown	6,650	30.0	−8.8
One Nation	Rosita Petch	5,802	26.2	+26.2
Greens	Marie Robb	956	4.3	+4.3
Total formal votes		22,164	98.3	+0.2
Informal votes		394	1.7	−0.2
Turnout		22,558	90.4	+1.5
Two-party-preferred result
National	Allan Grice	11,489	59.8	−1.4
Labor	Bob Brown	7,733	40.2	+1.4
National hold		Swing	−1.4	

1995 Queensland state election: Broadwater
Party	Candidate	Votes	%	±%
National	Allan Grice	12,364	61.2	+27.7
Labor	Bob Brown	7,839	38.8	+0.5
Total formal votes		20,203	98.0	+0.0
Informal votes		403	2.0	−0.0
Turnout		20,606	88.9	
National hold		Swing	+4.3	

1992 Queensland state election: Broadwater
Party	Candidate	Votes	%	±%
Labor	Tom Harrison	7,122	38.3	−3.9
National	Allan Grice	6,224	33.5	+6.7
Liberal	Kay Elson	4,611	24.8	−4.6
Independent	Felix Cernovs	639	3.4	+3.4
Total formal votes		18,596	98.0	
Informal votes		378	2.0	
Turnout		18,974	88.9	
Two-party-preferred result
National	Allan Grice	10,167	56.9	+56.9
Labor	Tom Harrison	7,695	43.1	−2.1
National gain from Liberal		Swing	N/A	
