= Santa Barbara, Queensland =

Santa Barbara
- Town
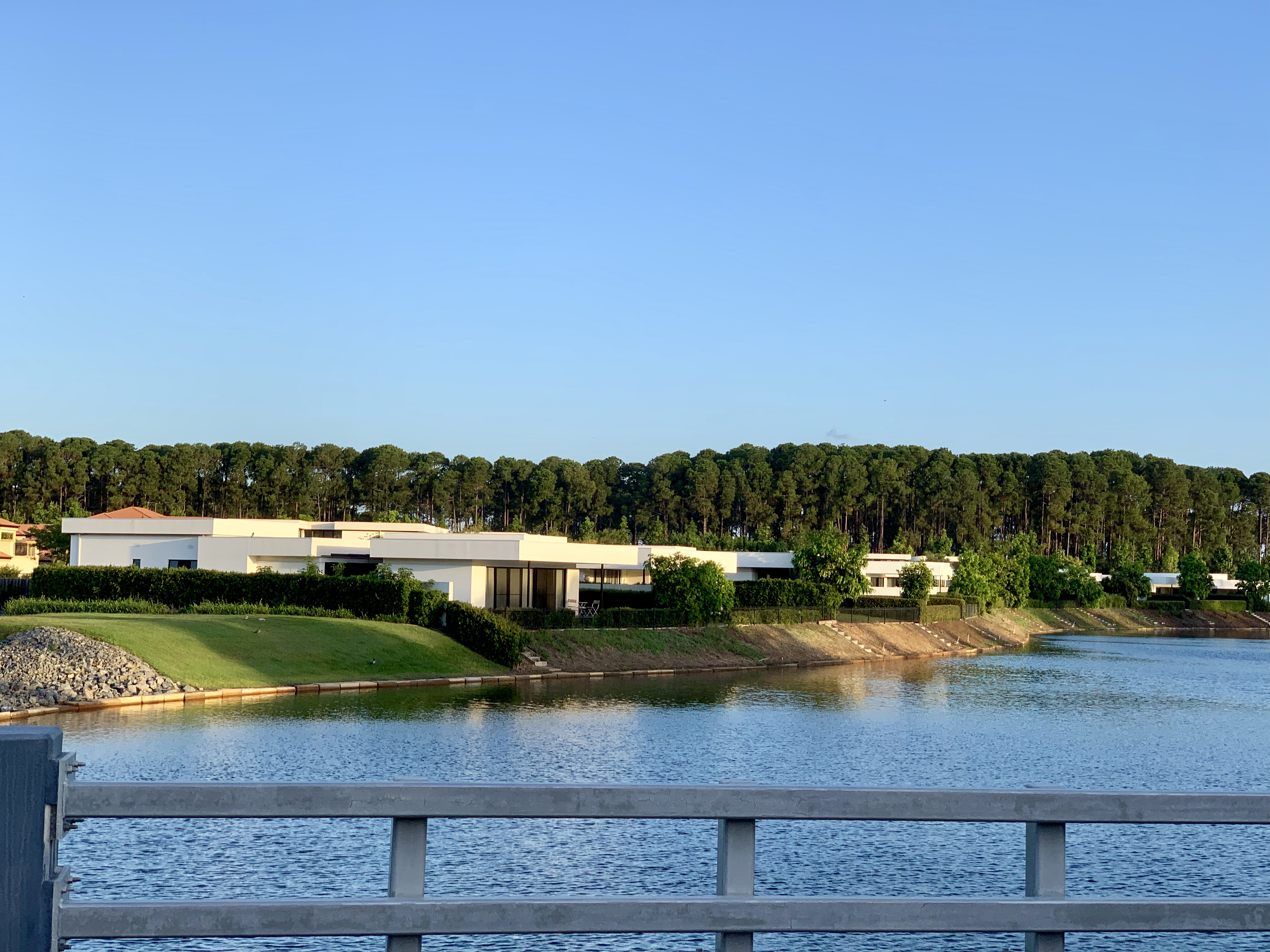
- Santa Barbara, 2019

- Interactive map of Santa Barbara
- Coordinates: 27.8638°S 153.3458°E
- Country: Australia
- State: Queensland
- City: Gold Coast
- LGA: City of Gold Coast
- Location: 10.6 km (6.6 mi) NNE of Helensvale; 18.2 km (11.3 mi) NNW of Southport; 20.8 km (12.9 mi) NNW of Surfers Paradise; 63.0 km (39.1 mi) SSE of Brisbane CBD

Government
  - State electorate: Broadwater
  - Federal division: Fadden
- Time zone: UTC+10:00 (AEST)
- Postcode: 4212

Santa Barbara is a locality in the City of Gold Coast, Queensland, Australia. It is within the suburb of Hope Island.

== History ==
The Queensland Place Names Board named the town on 1 March 1968.

== Education ==
There are no schools in Santa Barbara. The nearest government primary schools is Coombabah State School in Coombabah to the south-east. The nearest government secondary school is Helensvale State High School in neighbouring Helensvale to the south-west.
