= Electoral results for the district of Bonney =

Queensland, Australia, district election results

This is a list of electoral results for the electoral district of Bonney in Queensland state elections.

== Members for Bonney ==
Member	Party	Term
Sam O'Connor	Liberal National	2017–present

== Election results ==
=== Elections in the 2020s ===
2024 Queensland state election: Bonney
Party	Candidate	Votes	%	±%
Liberal National	Sam O'Connor	16,560	54.32	+1.06
Labor	Kyle Kelly-Collins	7,988	26.20	−5.87
Greens	Amin Javanmard	2,880	9.45	+1.75
One Nation	Scott Philip	2,305	7.56	+3.69
Family First	Maria Theresia Rossouw	752	2.47	+2.47
Total formal votes		30,485	95.26	−0.97
Informal votes		795	4.5	+0.97
Turnout		32,002	84.30	
Two-party-preferred result
Liberal National	Sam O'Connor	19,409	63.67	+3.60
Labor	Kyle Kelly-Collins	11,076	36.33	−3.60
Liberal National hold		Swing	+3.60	

2020 Queensland state election: Bonney
Party	Candidate	Votes	%	±%
Liberal National	Sam O'Connor	15,323	53.26	+9.39
Labor	Ash Borg	9,226	32.07	−3.62
Greens	Amin Javanmard	2,229	7.75	−2.02
One Nation	Michael Rix	1,113	3.87	+3.87
Independent	Leana Marquet	498	1.73	+1.73
United Australia	David Bark	381	1.32	+1.32
Total formal votes		28,770	96.27	+2.18
Informal votes		1,115	3.73	−2.18
Turnout		29,885	84.10	+0.95
Two-party-preferred result
Liberal National	Sam O'Connor	17,283	60.07	+8.38
Labor	Ash Borg	11,487	39.93	−8.38
Liberal National hold		Swing	+8.38	

=== Elections in the 2010s ===
2017 Queensland state election: Bonney
Party	Candidate	Votes	%	±%
Liberal National	Sam O'Connor	11,405	43.9	−0.1
Labor	Rowan Holzberger	9,279	35.7	+0.7
Greens	Amin Javanmard	2,540	9.8	+1.0
Independent	Robert Buegge	1,680	6.5	+6.5
Independent	Ron Nightingale	1,095	4.2	+4.2
Total formal votes		25,999	94.1	−3.1
Informal votes		1,633	5.9	+3.1
Turnout		27,632	83.2	−1.8
Two-party-preferred result
Liberal National	Sam O'Connor	13,439	51.7	−0.5
Labor	Rowan Holzberger	12,560	48.3	+0.5
Liberal National hold		Swing	−0.5	
