= Biggera Waters, Queensland =

Biggera Waters City of Gold Coast, Queensland
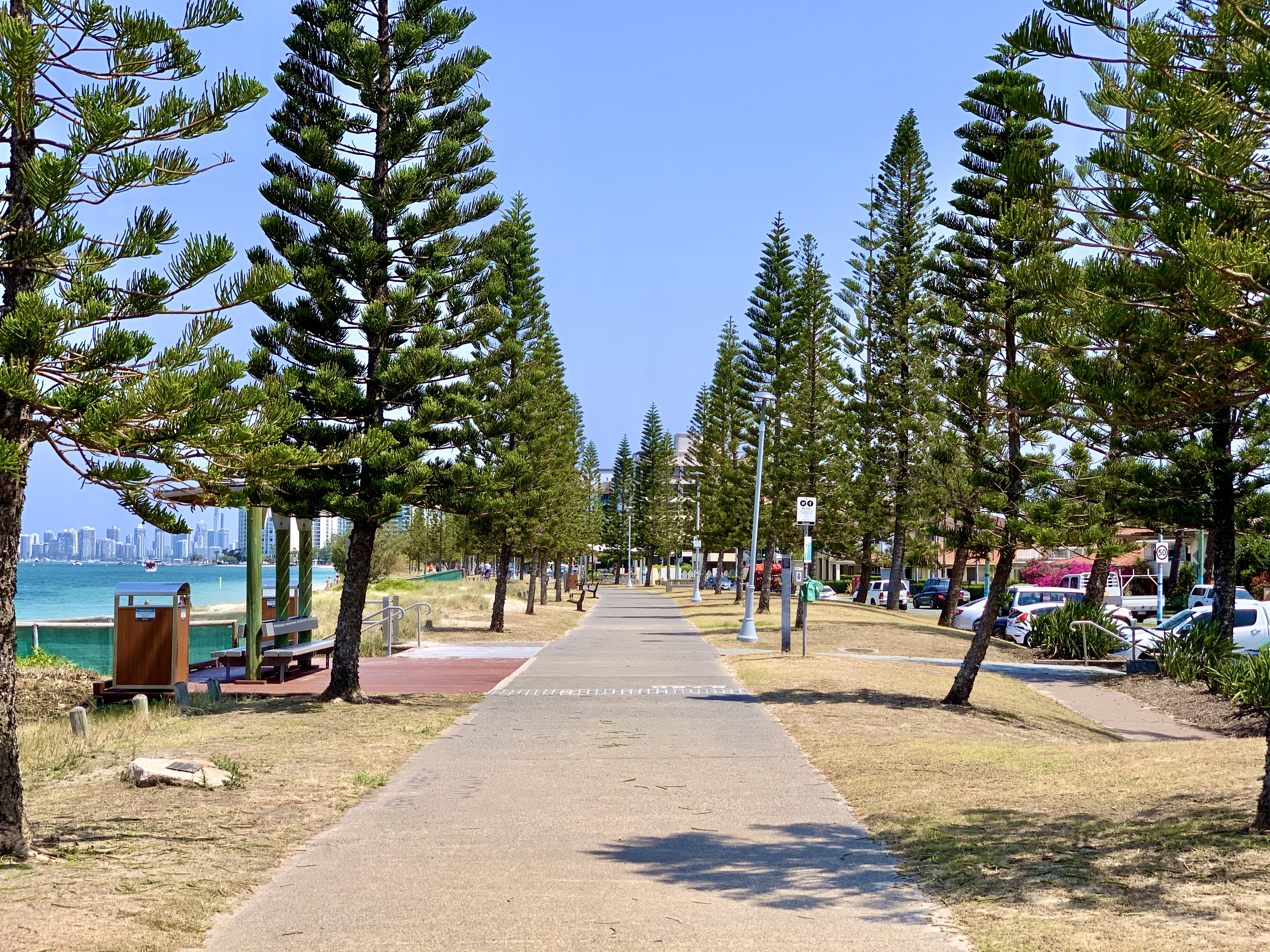
- The Broadwater foreshore at Biggera Waters

- Coordinates: 27.9308°S 153.3961°E
- Population: 9,973 (2021 census)
  - Density: 2,700/km^{2} (6,980/sq mi)
- Postcode(s): 4216
- Area: 3.7 km^{2} (1.4 sq mi)
- Time zone: AEST (UTC+10:00)
- Location: 5.3 km (3 mi) N of Southport; 9.0 km (6 mi) N of Surfers Paradise; 70.0 km (43 mi) SE of Brisbane
- LGA(s): City of Gold Coast
- State electorate(s): Broadwater; Bonney
- Federal division(s): Moncrieff
Suburbs around Biggera Waters:
Coombabah	Runaway Bay	The Broadwater
Coombabah	Biggera Waters	The Broadwater
Arundel	Labrador	The Broadwater

Biggera Waters is a coastal suburb in the City of Gold Coast, Queensland, Australia. In the 2021 census, Biggera Waters had a population of 9,973 people.

== Geography ==
Biggera Waters is located on the western side of the Broadwater. Beyond the Broadwater are South Stradbroke Island, Wave Break Island (27.9361°S 153.4189°E) and The Spit at Main Beach. Labrador Channel (27.9395°S 153.4098°E) lies along the southern coastline of the suburb separating it from Wave Break Island.

Biggera Creek enters the suburb from the south (Labrador) and then flows east where enters the Broadwater (27.9250°S 153.4061°E). The southern side of the mouth is a headland known as Lands End (27.9255°S 153.4064°E).

== Etymology ==
An article in the Royal Geographical Society of Australasia by F.J. Watson offers this translation:

"Bigera from the red iron bark tree (Eucalyptus siderophloia) from the Yugambeh language."

== History ==
Subdivided in the late 19th century, the area was originally settled by several fishing and agricultural families including John Siganto, a local landowner, who built a residence named "Finis" (Latin, "The End") at Land's End. Land from Portion 62, Parish of Barrow, bound by Broad Street to the south, Loder Street to the west and Saltwater Creek to the north, was offered for sale in August 1883. Allotments 7,8 and 9 of section 4, portion 62 being site of the Labrador Hotel were offered for sale at the same time.

A school reserve was created on Biggera Creek in 1889 on the corner of Hollywell Avenue and Coombabah Road but it wasn't until 27 January 1970 that the Biggera Waters State School opened.

In 1937 construction started on 36 acres of scrub land to the north of Biggera Creek to build an aerodrome. It was considered suitable for both land and the sea planes which used the Broadwater but development of the site was halted due to World War II. After the end of the war the aerodrome was revisited but the site was no longer considered suitable and other options were discussed.

Biggera Waters and surrounding regions experienced a period of growth in the 1950s and in 1953 approximately 18 acres of the aerodrome property, situated in the vicinity of Ocean, Broadwater and Stradbroke Streets, was sold for development.

By 1954, the area developed by Mr. Oates north of Biggera Creek was known as Angler's Paradise.

While there had been a crossing or bridge over the Biggera Creek for many years in the vicinity of Hollywell Road besides the school reserve, it wasn't until 1960, that a bridge was built across the mouth of the Biggera Creek at Land's End, opening up the northern side of the creek to greater residential development.

== Demographics ==
In the 2016 census, Biggera Waters had a population of 8,534 people. Of these 47.5% were male and 52.5% were female. Aboriginal and Torres Strait Islander people made up 1.3% of the population. The median age of the Biggera Waters population was 39 years, 1 years above the national median of 38. 56.5% of people were born in Australia. The next most common countries of birth were New Zealand 8.5%, England 4.9% and China 3.6%. 73.0% of people spoke only English at home. Other languages spoken at home included Mandarin at 3.9%. The most common responses for religion in Biggera Waters were No Religion 32.1%, Catholic 19.8% and Anglican 14.5%.

In the 2021 census, Biggera Waters had a population of 9,973 people.

== Education ==
Biggera Waters State School is a government primary (Prep-6) school for boys and girls on the corner of Morala Avenue and Coombabah Road (27.9272°S 153.3973°E). In 2018, the school had an enrolment of 880 students with 65 teachers (57 full-time equivalent) and 34 non-teaching staff (21 full-time equivalent). It includes a special education program.

There are no secondary schools in Biggera Waters. The nearest government secondary schools are Coombabah State High School in neighbouring Coombabah to the west and Southport State High School in Southport to the south.

== Amenities ==
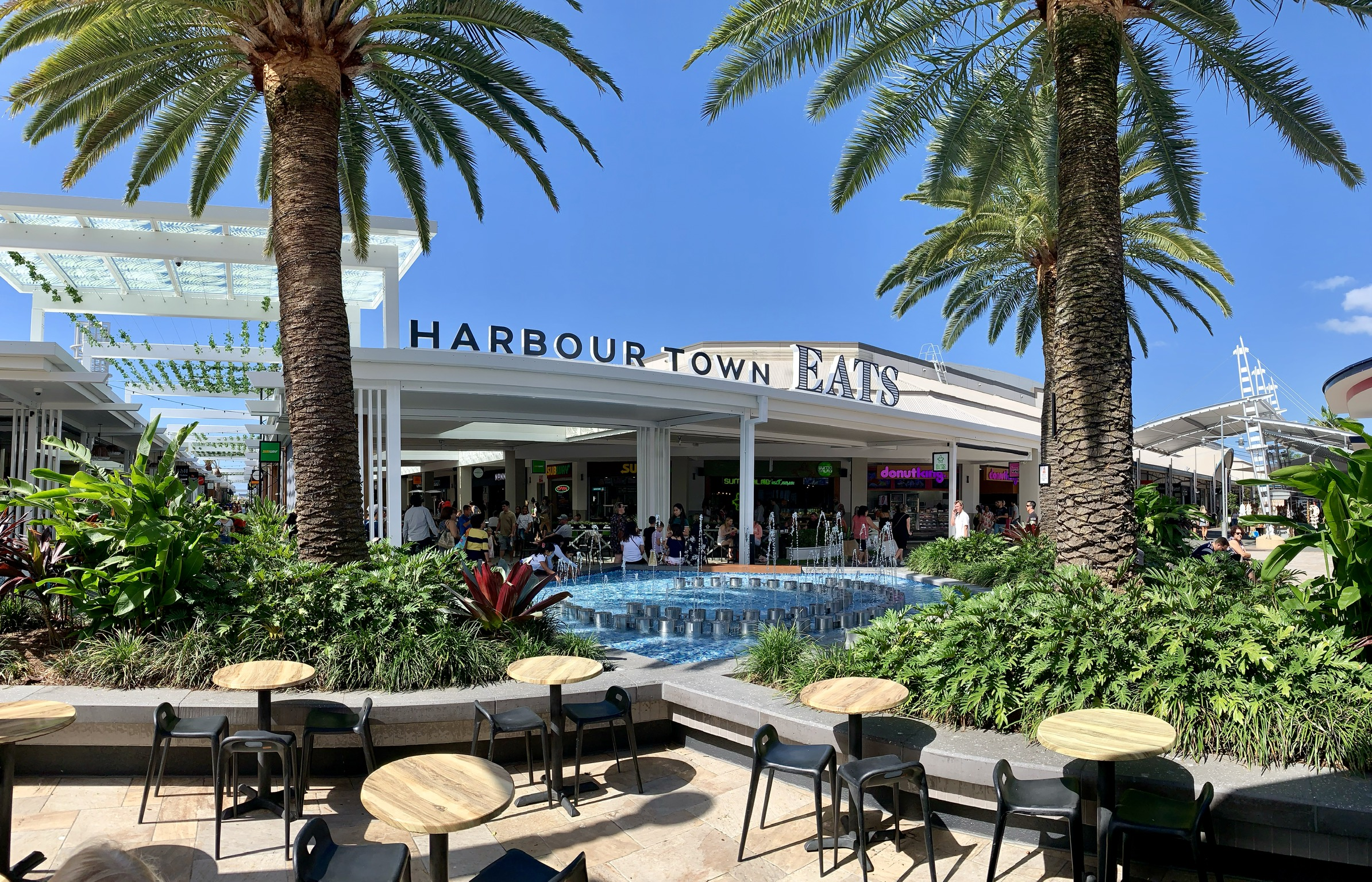
Food court, Harbour Town shopping centre

The Harbour Town factory outlet mall on the Gold Coast is located on Brisbane Road at Biggera Waters (27.9308°S 153.3874°E) on the site of the former Southport drive-in theatre.

There are a number of parks in the suburb, including:

- Ancorage Way Roadside Parklands (27.9233°S 153.3890°E)
- Annoula Avenue Reserve (27.9301°S 153.4002°E)
- Apex Park (27.9292°S 153.4011°E)
- Atlas Park (27.9228°S 153.3824°E)
- Brisbane Road Drainage Reserve (27.9358°S 153.4033°E)
- Cabarita Street Reserve (27.9345°S 153.3958°E)
- Canoe Park (27.9254°S 153.3841°E)
- Cawthray Street Reserve (27.9339°S 153.4036°E)
- Compass Drive Drainage Reserve (27.9261°S 153.3839°E)
- East Quay Drive Drainage Reserve (27.9239°S 153.3867°E)
- Gateway Drive Reserves (27.9327°S 153.3850°E)
- Harbour Quays Buffer Park (27.9253°S 153.3874°E)
- Harbour Town Drainage Reserve (27.9280°S 153.3792°E)
- Harbour Town North Park (27.9274°S 153.3835°E)
- Harley Park (27.9402°S 153.4084°E)
- Kayak Park (27.9248°S 153.3841°E)
- Kendor St Drainage Corridor (27.9305°S 153.3780°E)
- Little Park (27.9260°S 153.3789°E)
- Little Perry Park (27.9299°S 153.3984°E)
- Okinya Street Reserve (27.9288°S 153.3949°E)
- Perry Park (27.9304°S 153.3990°E)
- Quota Park (27.9271°S 153.4062°E)
- Raintree Link Parklands (27.9225°S 153.3847°E)
- Santo Family Park (27.9353°S 153.3973°E)
- Stewart Park (runaway Bay) (27.9272°S 153.3928°E)
- Stradbroke North Park (27.9269°S 153.4006°E)
- Stradbroke Park (27.9291°S 153.4007°E)
- Taylor Street Reserve (27.9292°S 153.4031°E)

== See also ==
- List of Gold Coast suburbs
