= Runaway Bay, Queensland =

Runaway Bay Gold Coast, Queensland
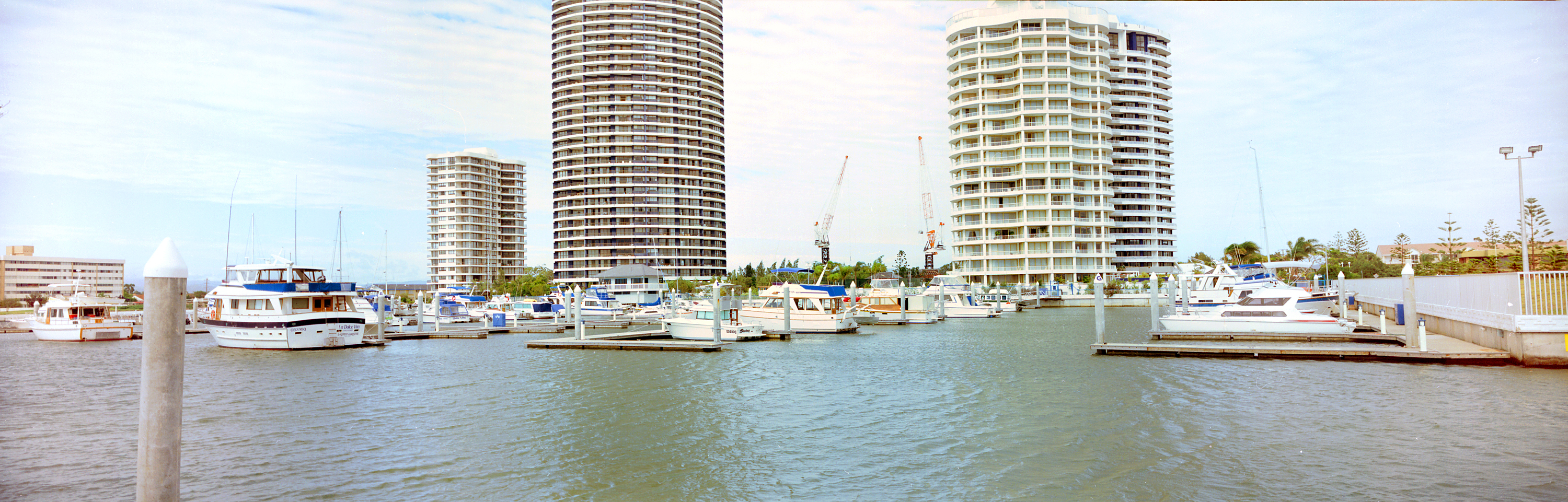
- Bayview Harbour, 1989

- Coordinates: 27.9141°S 153.4005°E
- Population: 9,308 (2021 census)
  - Density: 1,258/km^{2} (3,258/sq mi)
- Postcode(s): 4216
- Elevation: 5 m (16 ft)
- Area: 7.4 km^{2} (2.9 sq mi)
- Time zone: AEST (UTC+10:00)
- Location: 7.3 km (5 mi) N of Southport; 11.1 km (7 mi) N of Surfers Paradise; 71.1 km (44 mi) SE of Brisbane; 50 km (31 mi) NNW of Tweed Heads
- LGA(s): City of Gold Coast
- State electorate(s): Broadwater
- Federal division(s): Fadden
Suburbs around Runaway Bay:
Coombabah	Hollywell	South Stradbroke
Coombabah	Runaway Bay	South Stradbroke
Coombabah	Biggera Waters	South Stradbroke

Runaway Bay is a coastal suburb in the City of Gold Coast, Queensland, Australia. In the 2021 census, Runaway Bay had a population of 9,308 people.

The neighbourhood of Anglers Paradise (27.9233°S 153.3989°E) is situated within Runaway Bay. It is the southern area of Runaway Bay developed before 1967.

== Geography ==
The suburb is bounded by Poinsettia Avenue in the north, by Oxley Drive and Pine Ridge Road to the west, by Coombabah Road and Biggera Creek (27.9249°S 153.4060°E) to the south. In the east, the suburb's boundaries extend into the Gold Coast Broadwater.

Of the actual land surface, the land use is residential with the exception of the north-western corner of the suburb which is part of the Pine Ridge Conservation Park (27.9000°S 153.3928°E) which extends north into Hollywell.

Within its sea area, there is:

- Crab Island (27.9036°S 153.4116°E), an undeveloped low-lying mangrove area
- Carters Bank (27.9263°S 153.4119°E), a sandbank beyond the mouth of Biggera Creek.

There is a bridge in the south-east of the locality across the mouth of Biggera Creek to the Lands End headland in Biggera Waters to the south.

== History ==
In 1939, Robert George Oates (as the Anglers Paradise Development Company) bought 350 acres (140 ha) of land along Biggera Creek (around Ocean Street) and the Broadwater (around Bayview Street). By mid 1950s, there was a town water supply and about 50 homes, both permanent residences and holiday homes. In 1960 the construction of the bridge across the mouth of Biggera Creek to Lands End (then in Labrador) encouraged further development in the area.

In 1967, the Lae Enterprises company bought 182 hectares (450 acres) of land north of Anglers Paradise along the western shore of the Broadwater. Development started in 1972 to transform the subdivision into a residential and boating area. The name "Runaway Bay" was coined to promote the area as a tranquil retreat. Initially the name was rejected as an official suburb name, but it was used for the local post office, which led to it becoming the official suburb name.

St Francis Xavier's Catholic School opened on 28 January 1975. From that time until 1980, Catholic church services were held at the school by priests from the Southport parish. On 5 October 1980 a separate parish was formed with Father Basil Nolan as the first priest. The Holy Family Catholic Church opened in 1983.

The Runaway Bay Library opened in 1992 with a major refurbishment in 2011.

The Sports Super Centre was established in 2000 by runner Ron Clarke. In 2010 it was expanded to include an education program for schools. In 2011 it was sold to the Queensland Government.

== Demographics ==
In the 2016 census, Runaway Bay had a population of 9,068 people.

In the 2021 census, Runaway Bay had a population of 9,308 people.

== Education ==
St Francis Xavier School is a Catholic primary (Prep-6) school for boys and girls at 160 Bayview Street (27.9096°S 153.4020°E). In 2018, the school had an enrolment of 627 students with 36 teachers (31 full-time equivalent) and 34 non-teaching staff (24 full-time equivalent).

Runaway Bay Sport and Leadership Excellence Centre is a government sports education centre on the corner of Sports Drive and Morala Ave (27.9105°S 153.3975°E).

There are no mainstream government schools in Runaway Bay. The nearest government primary schools are Biggera Waters State School in neighbouring Biggera Waters to the south and Coombabah State School in neighbouring Coombabah to the north-west. The nearest government secondary school is Coombabah State High School in neighbouring Coombabah to the south-west.

== Facilities ==
Runaway Bay Police Station is at 190 Morala Avenue (27.9120°S 153.3977°E).

Runaway Bay Ambulance Station is at 2 Sports Drive (27.9112°S 153.3977°E).

Runaway Bay has its State Emergency Service facility off Sports Drive (27.9113°S 153.3958°E).

== Amenities ==
Runaway Bay Shopping Centre is in Lae Drive (27.9129°S 153.3996°E). Runaway Bay Post office is within the centre.

There is a cluster of fast food restaurants on the corner of Lae Drive and Oxley Drive (27.9126°S 153.3889°E).

The Gold Coast City Council operates a public library in Lae Drive (27.9113°S 153.3991°E) next to the community centre.

Holy Family Catholic Church is in Simbai Street (27.9090°S 153.4010°E) adjacent to the Catholic school.

Natural amenities include Pine Ridge Conservation Park and numerous other parks:

- Anchorage Way roadside park, provides public access to the canal on the corner of Anchorage Way and Grand Canal Way (27.9235°S 153.3905°E )
- Anglers Park, a long park on the Broadwater foreshore along Anglers Esplanade (27.9166°S 153.4077°E )
- Biggera Park, a neighbourhood park accessed from Coombabah Road (27.9255°S 153.3951°E )
- Broadview Park, a long park on the Broadwater foreshore along Constance Esplanade (27.9063°S 153.4071°E )
- Joseph Schneider Park, a small park on the Broadwater foreshore on Joseph Street (27.9039°S 153.4031°E )
- Kogler Avenue Reserve, beach access to the Broadwater from Poinsettia Avenue (27.9021°S 153.4046°E )
- Len And Muriel Godlonton Reserve, undeveloped bushland on Limetree Parade (27.9223°S 153.3976°E )
- Limetree Junction Parklands, undeveloped bushland on Oxley Drive (27.9225°S 153.3869°E )
- Marina Crescent Reserve, parkland on Marina Crescent (27.9023°S 153.4041°E)
- Marina Park, parkland beside the marina at the end of Marina Crescent (27.9006°S 153.4035°E)
- Morala Reserve, canal access from Morala Drive (27.9059°S 153.3976°E )
- O'Connell Park, large park on Ocean Street with playground, barbeques and picnic facilities (27.9253°S 153.3990°E )
- Oxley Drive Park, green space beside Oxley Drive (27.9187°S 153.3884°E )
- Pacific Park, a long park on the Broadwater foreshore along Oatland Esplanade (27.9222°S 153.4066°E )
- Poinsettia Park, parkland beside the marina on Marina Crescent (27.9022°S 153.4034°E)
- Rollo Meyers Park, parkland on Poinsettia Avenue (27.9026°S 153.4044°E)
- Ryder Park, park with boat ramp into Biggera Creek on Ray Street (27.9260°S 153.4028°E )
- Shearwater Park, a large park on the Broadwater foreshore along Shearwater Esplanade (27.9110°S 153.4079°E )
- Stradbroke North Park, a small park beside Biggera Creek on Stradbroke Street (27.9269°S 153.4006°E )
- Thyme Court Reserve, green space beside Oxley Drive (27.9166°S 153.3883°E )

There are two boat ramps in Runaway Bay, both managed by the Gold Coast City Council:

- on the north bank of Biggera Creek on Ray Street (27.9257°S 153.4038°E)
- on the Broadwater at Howard Street (27.9049°S 153.4063°E)

== Sport and recreation ==
The Sports Super Centre is a premier sports training and events facility in the Gold Coast. Facilities accommodate athletics, cricket, AFL, netball, soccer and indoor sports. The sports centre in Lae Drive (27.9093°S 153.3973°E) includes a stadium, sports medicine facility, gymnasium and Olympic aquatic centre.

The suburb is also home to the Runaway Bay Junior Rugby League club, which was formed in 1974 after local residents met at the old Runaway Bay shopping centre with the intention of forming a club for kids to play sport.

Bayview Harbour Yacht Squadron has a 2.2-hectare (5.4-acre) marina on Oatland Esplanade (27.9237°S 153.4065°E) with access to the Gold Coast Broadwater.

A number of well-known sporting teams represent the local area, including the rugby league team, the Runaway Bay Seagulls.

== See also ==
- City of Gold Coast Libraries
