= Boykambil, Queensland =

Boykambil Gold Coast, Queensland
- Coordinates: 27.8716°S 153.3672°E
- Postcode(s): 4212
- Time zone: AEST (UTC+10:00)
- Location: 9.4 km (6 mi) NE of Helensvale; 15.6 km (10 mi) N of Southport; 19.2 km (12 mi) NNW of Surfers Paradise; 64.0 km (40 mi) SE of Brisbane
- LGA(s): City of Gold Coast
- State electorate(s): Broadwater
- Federal division(s): Fadden

Boykambil is a town in the City of Gold Coast, Queensland, Australia. It is within the suburb of Hope Island.

== History ==
The name is an Bundjalung word. Its meaning is uncertain, referring either to a natural feature of Hope Island, from "buyu-gumma" meaning a broken leg, or "Boggumbil" meaning the Moreton Bay Chestnut (Castanospermum australe).

Hope Island was named after colonial aristocrat Captain Louis Hope, who was granted approximately 1,800 acres (7.3 km^{2}) of land at the mouth of the Coomera River in recognition of his contribution in developing the sugar industry in Queensland. In May 1874, Hope subdivided his land on Boykambil Island into smaller farm lots of 30 to 50 acres (12 to 20 ha). However, at July 1876 most of the land (1,744 acres (706 ha) remained unsold.

It was declared a town on 1 March 1968 by the Queensland Place Names Board.
