= Hollywell, Queensland =

Hollywell
- Suburb
- Interactive map of Hollywell
- Coordinates: 27.8955°S 153.3994°E
- Country: Australia
- State: Queensland
- City: Gold Coast
- LGA: City of Gold Coast
- Location: 9.0 km (5.6 mi) N of Southport; 12.5 km (7.8 mi) N of Surfers Paradise; 67.7 km (42.1 mi) SE of Brisbane CBD; 51.8 km (32.2 mi) NNW of Tweed Heads

Government
  - State electorate: Broadwater
  - Federal division: Fadden

Area
  - Total: 2.9 km^{2} (1.1 sq mi)
- Elevation: 4 m (13 ft)

Population
  - Total: 2,930 (2021 census)
  - Density: 1,010/km^{2} (2,620/sq mi)
- Time zone: UTC+10:00 (AEST)
- Postcode: 4216
Suburbs around Hollywell
| Paradise Point | Paradise Point | Paradise Point |
| Coombabah | Hollywell | South Stradbroke |
| Coombabah | Runaway Bay | South Stradbroke |

Hollywell is a coastal suburb in the City of Gold Coast, Queensland, Australia. In the 2021 census, Hollywell had a population of 2,930 people.

== Geography ==
In the east, the suburb's boundaries extend into the Gold Coast Broadwater. Of the actual land surface, the land use is residential with the exception of the south-western quarter of the suburb which is part of the Pine Ridge Conservation Park (27.9000°S 153.3928°E) which extends south into Runaway Bay.

The Runaway Bay Marina is located in the south-east corner of the locality (27.9006°S 153.4024°E).

== History ==
A 1926 map shows the area named as Pine Ridge. That name is no longer official but persists in Park Ridge Road and in the Park Ridge Conservation Park. Park Ridge Road as shown on a 1978 map extended north of the present road roughly along the current Oxley Drive through Holleywell and the current Paradise Road at Paradise Point (27.8870°S 153.3913°E).

The suburb takes its name from the residence of Joseph Wood Proud who was Mayor of Southport from 1934 to 1948. Proud named it after his home in England.

== Demographics ==
In the 2011 census, Hollywell had a population of 2,679 people, 49.9% female and 50.1% male. The median age of the Hollywell population was 47 years, 10 years above the national median of 37. 70.7% of people living in Hollywell were born in Australia. The other top responses for country of birth were New Zealand 9.4%, England 5.7%, South Africa 0.8%, Scotland 0.7%, Germany 0.7%. 91.8% of people spoke only English at home; the next most common languages were 0.7% Japanese, 0.6% German, 0.4% French, 0.4% Italian, 0.3% Russian.

In the 2016 census, Hollywell had a population of 2,865 people.

In the 2021 census, Hollywell had a population of 2,930 people.

== Education ==
There are no schools in Hollywell. The nearest government schools are Coombabah State School (primary) and Coombabah State High School (secondary), both in neighbouring Coombabah.

== Amenities ==
Hollywell Fire Station is at 318 Bayview Street (27.8954°S 153.3988°E).

There are two boat ramps on Centenary Drive into the Gold Coast Broadwater. One is at the junction with Jasmine Avenue (27.8962°S 153.4026°E) and the other at the junction with Holly Avenue (27.8979°S 153.4032°E). They are managed by the Gold Coast City Council.
