= Harbour Town =

Shopping malls in Australia

The Harbour Town Premium Outlet shopping centres are the only outdoor outlet shopping centres in Australia. The Harbour Town centres on the Gold Coast and in Adelaide incorporate multiple factory outlets into a single shopping destination. As of June 2025, there are two locations owned and operated under the Harbour Town Premium Outlets brand: Biggera Waters, on Queensland's Gold Coast, and at Adelaide Airport, in South Australia.

The Harbour Town Premium Outlets centres are owned by Lewis Land, Australia's oldest, private property developer. Harbour Town centres previously also operated in Perth, Western Australia and Docklands, Victoria before being sold and rebranded.

== Current centres ==
=== Gold Coast ===
Harbour Town Premium Outlets Gold Coast
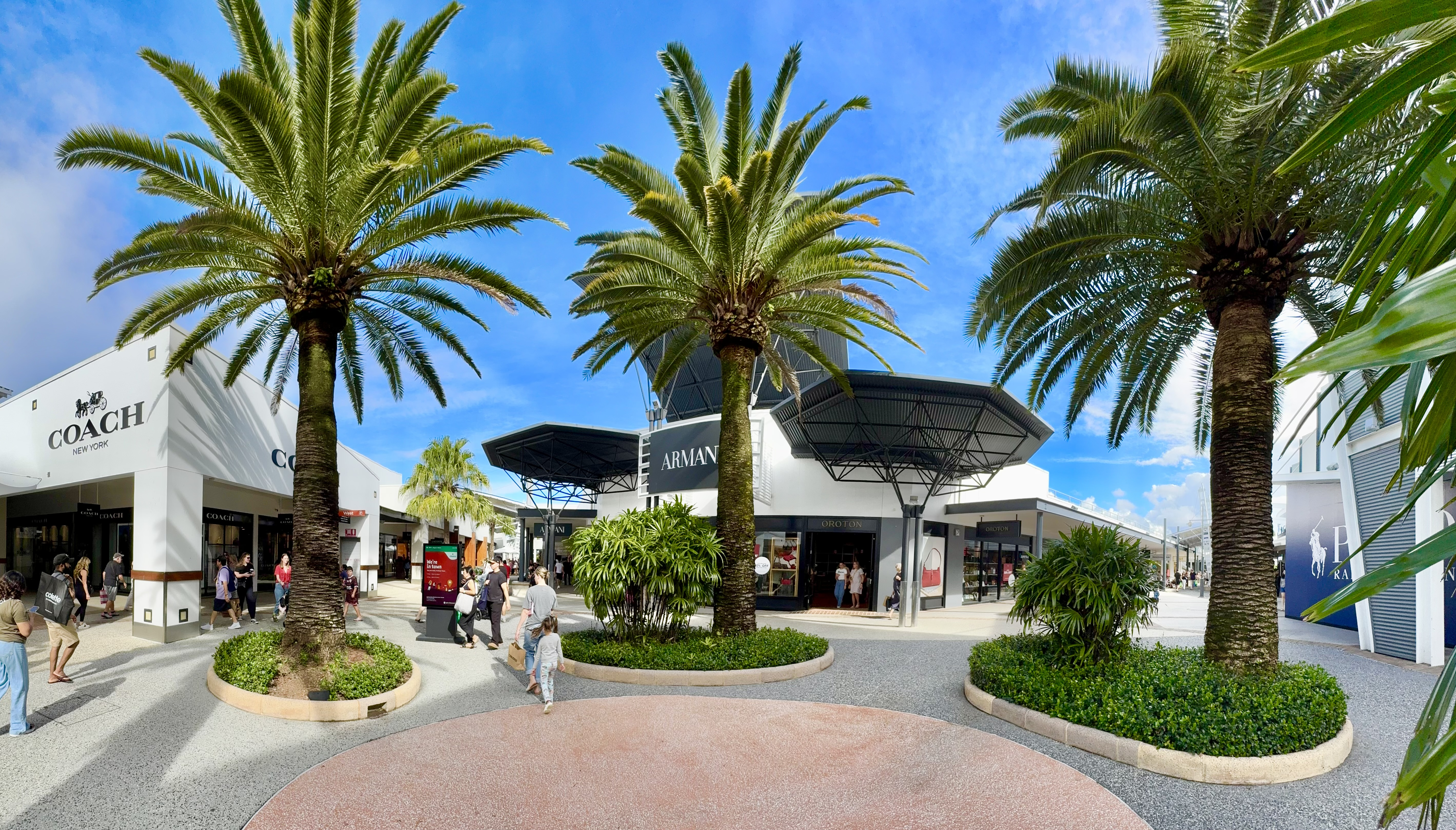
- Harbour Town Shopping Centre, Gold Coast, 2025
- Location: Gold Coast, Queensland, Australia
- Coordinates: 27°55′53″S 153°23′16″E
- Opened: 1999; 27 years ago
- Owner: Lewis Land Group (50%); Vicinity Centres (50%)
- Website: https://harbourtowngoldcoast.com.au/

Harbour Town Premium Outlets Gold Coast is situated on the corner of the Gold Coast Highway and Oxley Drive in Biggera Waters, Queensland. Opening in 1999 and located on the Gold Coast Highway just 20 minutes north of Surfers Paradise en route to theme parks, Harbour Town Gold Coast was the first and is still the largest purpose-built brand direct factory outlet shopping centre in Australia. It is anchored with a Woolworths supermarket.

Today, Harbour Town Premium Outlets Gold Coast is home to over 200 stores, including a large dining precinct known at Harbour Town Eats, and Gold Coast's largest Reading Cinema.

In June 2026, the Queensland state government announced an extension of the G:link light rail system, which would see a new station (provisionally known as Biggera Waters) located outside Harbour Town as the terminus of the new branch line.

=== Adelaide ===
Harbour Town Premium Outlets Adelaide
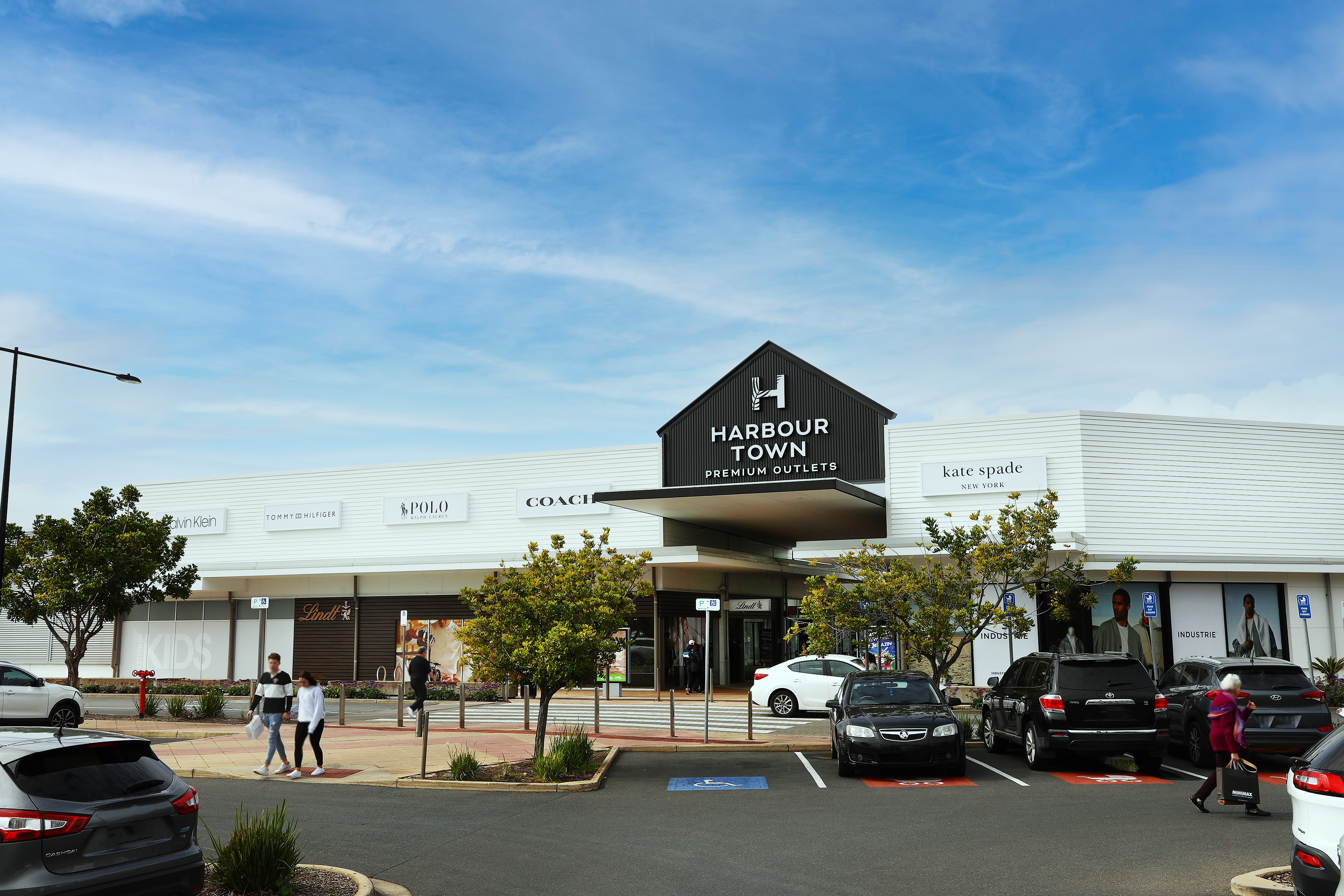
- Harbour Town Northern Entrance
- Location: Adelaide, South Australia
- Coordinates: 34°56′49″S 138°31′13″E
- Opened: 2003; 23 years ago
- Owner: Lewis Land Group
- Website: https://harbourtownadelaide.com.au/

Harbour Town Premium Outlets Adelaide opened in 2003, and is situated next to the Adelaide Airport, South Australia. It features over 110 outlet stores along with a chemist, cafes and eateries, homewares and outdoor products.

Harbour Town Adelaide is South Australia's largest outlet shopping destination, and the only shopping centre in South Australia to offer a dedicated Guest Lounge for tourist visitors.

== Former centres ==
=== Perth ===
A Harbour Town centre in Perth, Western Australia opened in 2003. In October 2013 it was sold to the Far East Organization of Singapore and rebranded to Watertown Brand Outlet Centre. Consisting of about 120 outlet stores, the shopping centre covers 1.9 hectares (4.7 acres) and is located at 840 Wellington Street, West Perth. It was constructed and formerly owned by the Lewis Land Group in a joint venture with ING Real Estate Development Australia.

=== Melbourne ===
A Harbour Town centre in Docklands, Victoria opened in 2008. It was sold in March 2014 and rebranded to The District Docklands in 2017.

== See also ==
- Direct Factory Outlets
