= Coombabah =

- Suburb
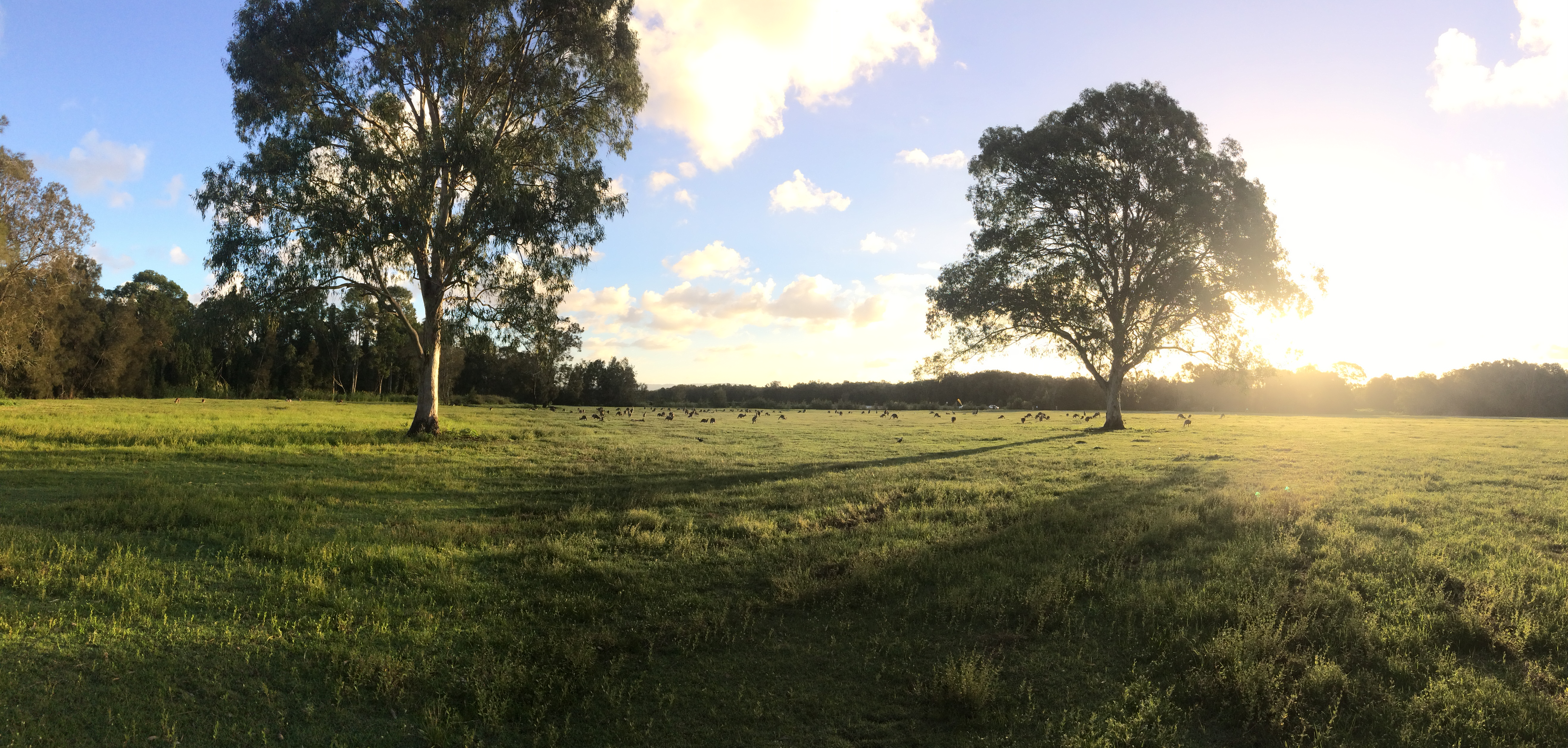
- The sun setting in Coombabah Lake Conservation Park, 2018

- Interactive map of Coombabah
- Coordinates: 27.9097°S 153.3711°E
- Country: Australia
- State: Queensland
- City: Gold Coast
- LGA: City of Gold Coast
- Location: 10 km (6.2 mi) N of Southport; 14 km (8.7 mi) N of Surfers Paradise; 67 km (42 mi) SSE of Brisbane; 50 km (31 mi) NNW of Tweed Heads

Government
  - State electorates: Broadwater; Bonney
  - Federal division: Fadden

Area
  - Total: 13.2 km^{2} (5.1 sq mi)
- Elevation: 6 m (20 ft)

Population
  - Total: 10,298 (2021 census)
  - Density: 780.2/km^{2} (2,021/sq mi)
- Time zone: UTC+10:00 (AEST)
- Postcode: 4216
Suburbs around Coombabah
Helensvale	Helensvale	Paradise Point; Hollywell
Helensvale	Coombabah	Runaway Bay
Arundel	Biggera Waters	Biggera Waters

Coombabah is a suburb in the City of Gold Coast, Queensland, Australia. In the 2021 census, Coombabah had a population of 10,298 people.

== Geography ==
Surrounding Coombabah is Paradise Point and Hope Island to the north, Arundel to the south, Runaway Bay and Biggera Waters to the east and Helensvale to the west and the Coombabah State High School. The minor arterial road servicing Coombabah is Oxley Drive.

== History ==
The suburb takes its name from Coombabah Lake and Coombabah Creek, which in turn are named using Bundjalung language, Ngaraangbal dialect words meaning place of the wood grubs, from the word goombo meaning teredo worm, which was a deliberately cultivated food source by the Indigenous people.

Coombabah Provisional School opened circa July 1887 as a special school for the children of parents who were employed in Public Works in the area. The school was moved to Acrobat Creek and re-opened on 10 Jan 1889 as Acrobat Creek Provisional School for the children of workers building railways in the area. It closed in September 1890.

In August 1920, another Coombabah Provisional School opened as a half-time provisional school in conjunction with Pine Ridge Provisional School (meaning the schools shared the teacher). closed on April-24. In JUly 1922 it closed due to low student number, but later that year re-opened as a full-time previsional school (having its own teacher). It closed permanently in April 1924.

Coombabah State School opened on 27 January 1981.

Coombabah State High School opened on 28 January 1986.

== Demographics ==
In the 2006 census, Coombabah had a population of 9,303. It grew to 9,774 by the 2011 census .

In the 2011 census, Coombabah recorded a population of 9,774 people, 54.1% female and 45.9% male. The median age of the Coombabah population was 45 years, 8 years above the national median of 37. 61.6% of people living in Coombabah were born in Australia. The other top responses for country of birth were New Zealand 10.6%, England 8.8%, Scotland 1.2%, South Africa 1.1%, Philippines 1%. 87% of people spoke only English at home; the next most common languages were 0.5% Tagalog, 0.5% French, 0.5% Japanese, 0.5% Italian, 0.5% Mandarin.

In the 2016 census, Coombabah had a population of 10,388 people.

In the 2021 census, Coombabah had a population of 10,298 people.

== Coombabah Conservation Area ==
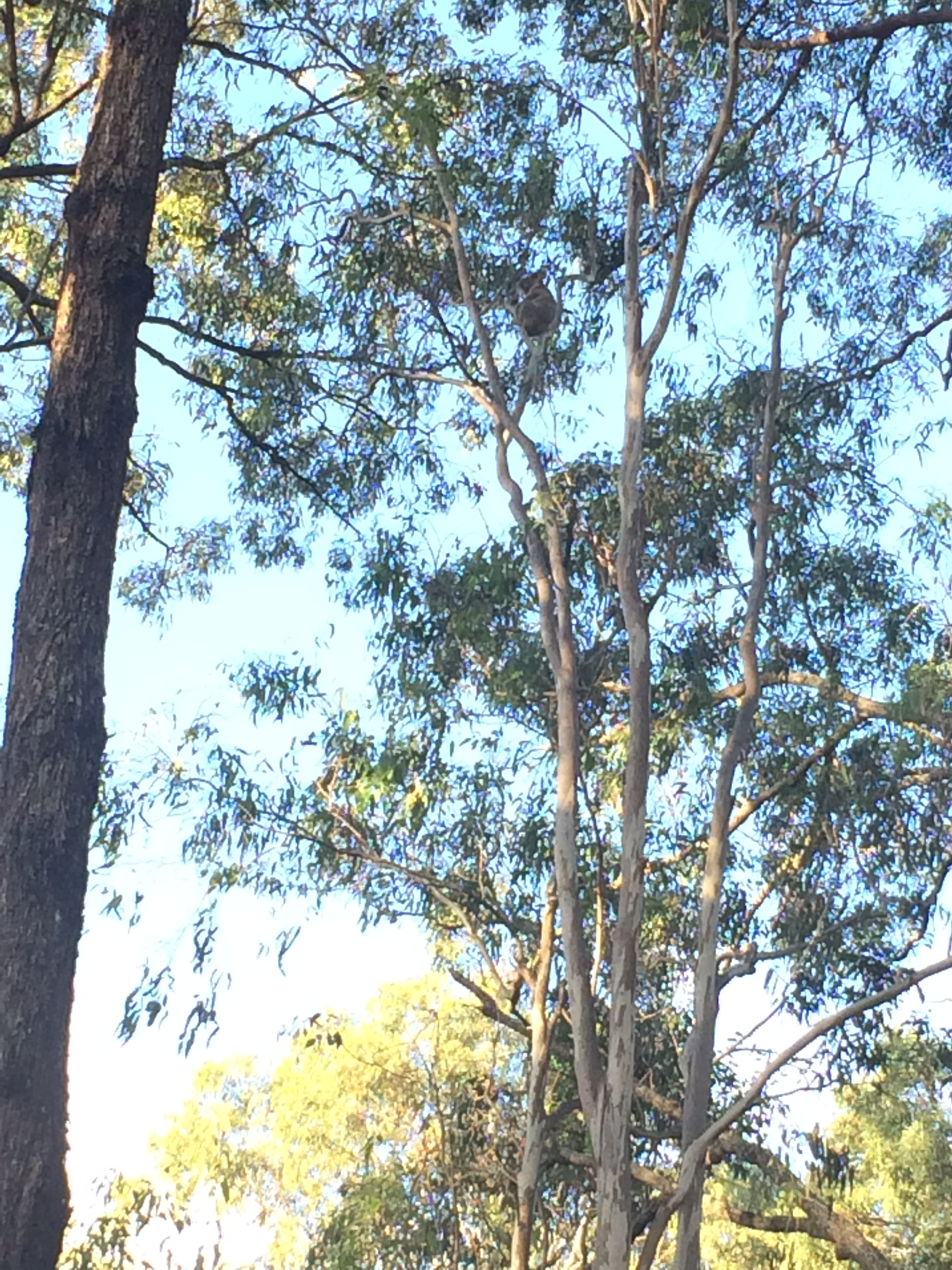
Koala in Coombabah Lake Conservation Park, 2018

Sometimes called Coombabah Lake, the Coombabah Lakelands is one of only five sites in Queensland included in the Ramsar international convention for significant wetlands. The conservation area is surrounded by homes, roads and businesses. The land was bought by Council in the 1980s as a buffer zone for a sewerage plant. In 1994 that Council declared the Coombabah Lakeland Conservation Area. The integrity of the conservation and animal habitat is overseen by several Authorities. There are ten kilometres worth of dirt tracks, gravel and boardwalks for access by the public. For marine habitat the area is a protected fish habitat under the Queensland Fisheries Act and a protected marine conservation and habitat zone under the Moreton Bay Marine Park Zoning plan. Guided bush walks day and night are run by the council's Natural Areas Management Unit. Three is a carpark on Rain Tree Glen for access to tracks.

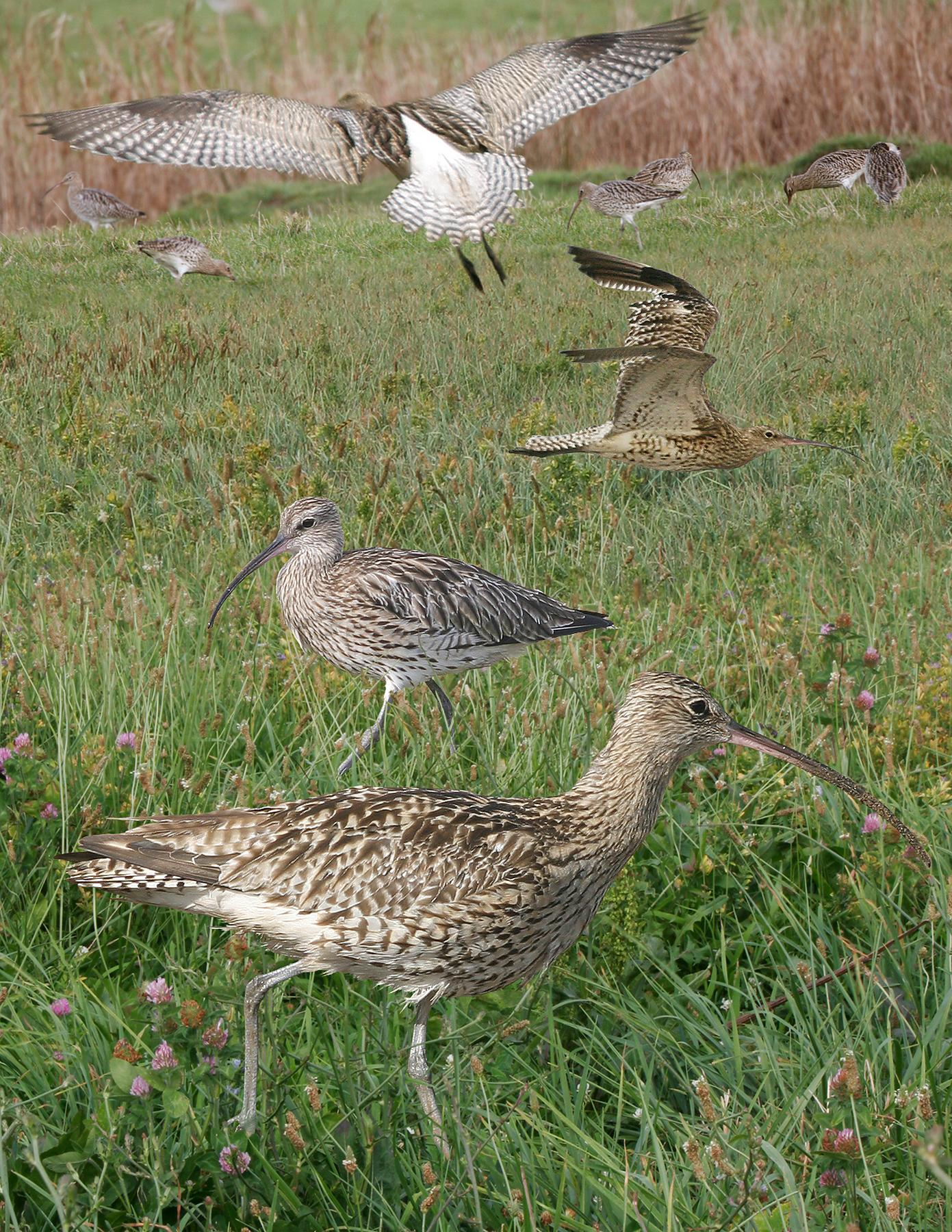
Eurasian curlew

Griffith University's Healthy Rivers Institute conduct ongoing research in the area. Over 150 bird species use the area, so conservation of the wetlands aims to ensure migratory birds can use the area, and will continue to come. Coombabah is also part of migratory bird agreements with China and Japan. The threatened migratory eastern curlew rests at Coombabah on its way to Russia or north-eastern China breeding grounds. A bird hide is accessed off Shelter Road. Brisbane/Gold Coast branch of Bird Observation and Conservation Australia organise guided bird watching visits.

== Education ==
Coombabah State School is a government primary (Prep-6) school for boys and girls at 164-172 Oxley Drive (27.8942°S 153.3885°E). In 2017, the school had an enrolment of 734 students with 53 teachers (46 full-time equivalent) and 25 non-teaching staff (17 full-time equivalent). It includes a special education program.

Coombabah State High School is a government secondary (7-12) school for boys and girls at Pine Ridge Road (27.9243°S 153.3783°E). In 2017, the school had an enrolment of 1100 students with 92 teachers (88 full-time equivalent) and 41 non-teaching staff (32 full-time equivalent). It includes a special education program.

== Notable residents ==
- Ugly Dave Gray, television personality.
- Taine Tuaupiki, rugby league player.
