= Scott Sattler =

Australian rugby league footballer

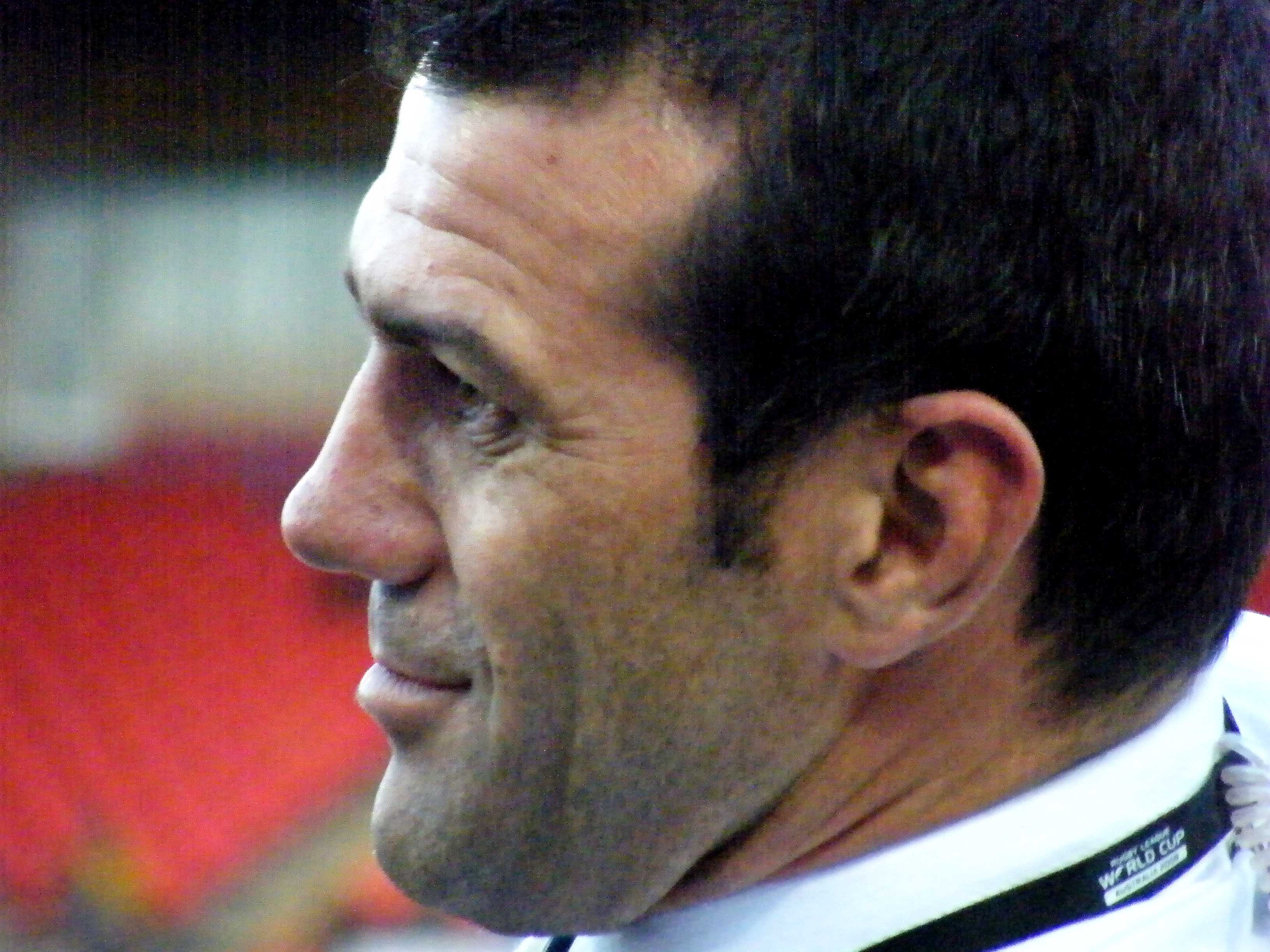
- Sattler in 2008

Personal information
- Born: 13 December 1971 (age 54) Camperdown, New South Wales, Australia

Playing information
- Height: 180 cm (5 ft 11 in)
- Weight: 95 kg (14 st 13 lb)
- Position: Lock
Club
Years	Team	Pld	T	G	FG	P
1992–93	Gold Coast Seagulls	6	1	0	0	4
1994	Eastern Suburbs	1	0	0	0	0
1995–96	South Qld Crushers	8	0	0	0	0
1997–98	Gold Coast Chargers	48	4	0	0	16
1999–03	Penrith Panthers	118	16	1	0	66
2004	Wests Tigers	22	2	0	0	8
	Total	203	23	1	0	94
Representative
Years	Team	Pld	T	G	FG	P
2003	Queensland	1	0	0	0	0
- Education: Coombabah State School
- Alma mater: Nudgee College
- Father: John Sattler

Scott Sattler (born 13 December 1971) is an Australian former professional rugby league footballer who played during the 1990s and 2000s, later becoming the Football Manager of the Gold Coast Titans. He is the son of South Sydney Rabbitohs great John Sattler. A Queensland State of Origin representative lock, he played his club football for the Gold Coast Chargers from 1992 to 1993 as well as a second spell with the club between 1997 and 1998. He also played for the Eastern Suburbs Roosters in 1994, the South Queensland Crushers between 1995 and 1996, the Penrith Panthers between 1999 and 2003 and one season with the Wests Tigers in 2004. He is the son of former player John Sattler.

== Background ==
Sattler was born in Camperdown, New South Wales but moved to Queensland as a one-year-old where his family settled on the Gold Coast. He initially attended Coombabah State School on the Gold Coast before taking up a rugby union scholarship at Nudgee College in Brisbane at the beginning of his secondary education. Years later he returned to the Gold Coast to complete his schooling at Coombabah State High School and play junior rugby league for the Runaway Bay Seagulls before signing his first professional contract with his hometown team the Gold Coast Seagulls in 1991.

== Playing career ==
=== Gold Coast ===
Sattler joined the Gold Coast Seagulls as a junior from the Runaway Bay Seagulls junior club. He made his first grade debut for the club against the Parramatta Eels at the age of twenty. Sattler's first two years at the Gold Coast saw the club finish last on the table.

=== Eastern Suburbs ===
Sattler joined Eastern Suburbs in 1994 but his time with the club was a brief one, only making a single appearance off the bench for the club.

=== South Queensland ===
He joined the South Queensland Crushers in 1995. Sattler played in the club's first ever game, a 6-24 loss against reigning premiers the Canberra Raiders.

In 2020, Sattler recalled his time at South Queensland stating that the club was financially mismanaged from the beginning, Sattler went on to say "We got told before our first game that our wages might not be paid. Graham Richardson, the Labor Party politician, came up and said he was going to fight for us but we never saw him again.

One day the Crushers said to come and pick up my cheque for the season. I’d struggled to make mortgage payments for four months and I was too scared to open the envelope. I’ll never forget driving down the freeway south of Brisbane and pulling over on the side of the road, I looked across at the Gabba in the distance, opened up the cheque and it said $5500. I remember breaking down in tears and thinking, 'What am I going to do? I’m going to have to sell my house and start from scratch".

=== Gold Coast ===
He joined the club he began his career with, the Gold Coast Chargers, in 1997 for his second spell with the club. He played 24 games for the club in the 1997 ARL season as the Gold Coast qualified for the first time in their history. Sattler played in both of the club's finals matches. The following year would be the Gold Coast's last in the competition and Sattler played in their final ever game, an 18-20 loss against Cronulla-Sutherland.

=== Penrith ===
After his second spell with the Gold Coast club, Sattler moved to the Penrith Panthers in 1999. He was named as the first grade player of the year in 2001 after an impressive season personally despite Penrith finishing last on the table. In 2003, he made his sole representative appearance, "a brief foray into State of Origin football as an interchange player" in a 27-6 loss.

Sattler will perhaps be best remembered for one of the greatest tackles in rugby league grand final history in 2003. During a pivotal point in the match, Sattler chased down and made a textbook tackle on the Sydney Roosters winger Todd Byrne to send him over the touchline during his club's 18 points to 6 victory. Reflecting on that tackle Sattler stated, "It was one tackle and when I was out on the field I didn’t really think about it being a turning point in the game. You just focus on each tackle as they happen and do what you need to do to get the job done."

After the 2003 season, in which Sattler won his sole premiership, he left the club to join the Wests Tigers due to salary cap restrictions. After it was announced that Sattler would be leaving the club he stated, "This is the perfect way to leave the club. I'm looking forward to going to Wests Tigers next year and playing a senior role." He was later more critical, saying, "I was told by the CEO at the start of the year that if I was having a good year by the middle of the season there would be a contract for me and I made Origin that year which means I’m probably playing ok and when I was in Origin I found out there was no deal for me."

=== Wests Tigers ===
Sattler joined the Wests Tigers in 2004 where he played one season for the club before retiring from rugby league. That year he was named captain. Also during that year, Sattler was named as the player of the tournament at the Wests Tigers 2004 World Sevens Championship victory. After his final year in rugby league, Sattler required a knee operation to undergo a cartilage graft. In total he played 203 first grade games for five different clubs.

== Representative career ==
=== Queensland ===
In 2003, Scott Sattler became the second oldest player, after Arthur Beetson, to be selected for the Queensland State of Origin team. He made only one appearance for his state.

== Coaching career ==
=== Gold Coast Titans ===
In 2006, it was announced that Scott Sattler had signed for the Gold Coast Titans as the Football Manager for the club. Upon signing for the club, Sattler commented, "Having made my First Grade debut with the Gold Coast and playing all my junior football here I feel I have an emotional attachment to the club; an attachment that I want to make sure this team is one that is successful on and off the field. I have experienced the highs and lows of Rugby League and I feel I can draw on those experiences into assisting the mould we want at this club; a club the Gold Coast and Northern NSW community will embrace."

Sattler resigned from his position as football manager with the Titans in January, 2008, citing the pursuit of other business interests as his reason.
