= Sam O'Connor =

Australian politician

The Honourable Sam O’Connor MP
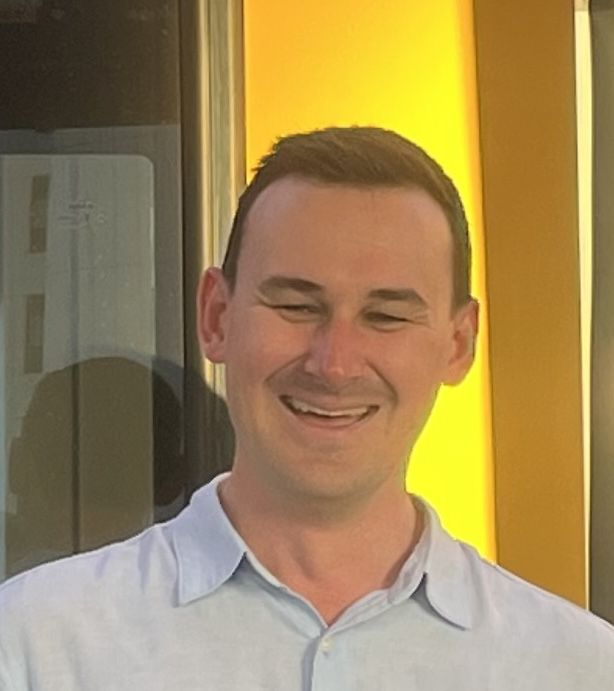

Minister for Housing and Public Works and Minister for Youth
- Incumbent
- Assumed office 1 November 2024
- Premier: David Crisafulli
- Preceded by: Meaghan Scanlon
Shadow ministerial positions
Shadow Minister for Environment and the Great Barrier Reef, Shadow Minister for Science and Innovation, and Shadow Minister for Youth
In office 16 November 2020 – 31 October 2024
Leader	David Crisafulli
Shadow Assistant Minister to the Opposition Leader and Shadow Assistant Minister for Youth
In office 15 December 2017 – 15 November 2020
Leader	Deb Frecklington

Member of the Queensland Parliament for Bonney
- Incumbent
- Assumed office 25 November 2017
- Preceded by: New seat

Personal details
- Born: 5 August 1991 (age 35) Ipswich, Queensland
- Party: Liberal National Party
- Education: University of Queensland (BSc/BA)

Samuel Thomas O'Connor (born 5 August 1991) is an Australian politician and since November 2024, the current Queensland Minister for Housing and Public Works and Minister for Youth. He has been the Liberal National Party member for Bonney in the Queensland Legislative Assembly since 2017.

== Political views ==
After the death of Queen Elizabeth II in September 2022, O'Connor extended his condolences, while also declaring his support for an Australian Republic.

O'Connor was the only LNP state MP who supported the Voice to Parliament in 2023.

Parliament of Queensland
New seat	Member for Bonney; 2017–present	Incumbent
