= Hope Island, Queensland =

Hope Island
- Suburb
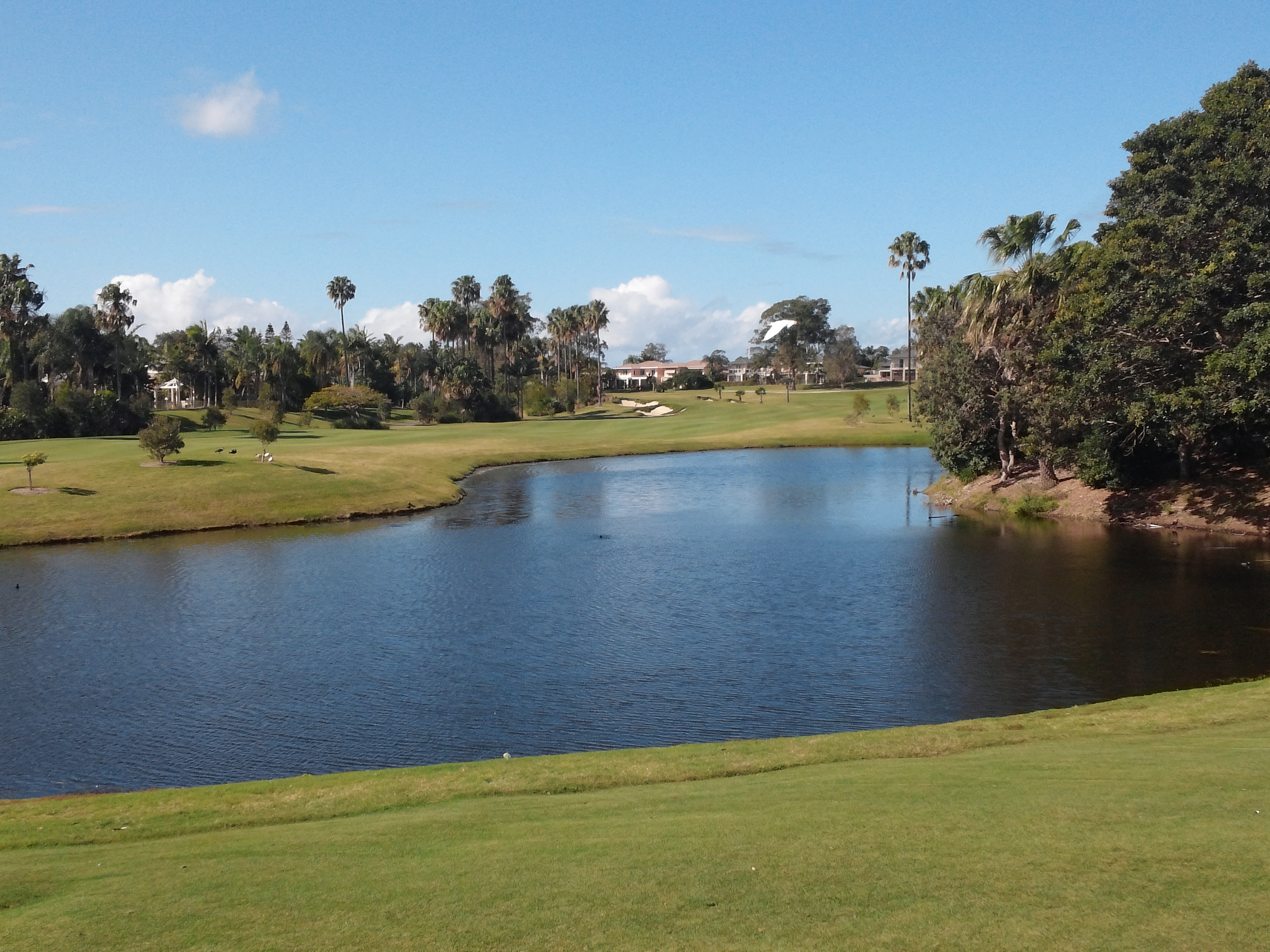
- The Palms Golf Course, 2013

- Interactive map of Hope Island
- Coordinates: 27.8669°S 153.3619°E
- Country: Australia
- State: Queensland
- City: Gold Coast
- LGA: City of Gold Coast
- Location: 15.7 km (9.8 mi) NNW of Southport; 19.1 km (11.9 mi) NNW of Surfers Paradise; 61.2 km (38.0 mi) SE of Brisbane CBD

Government
  - State electorate: Broadwater
  - Federal division: Fadden

Area
  - Total: 14.2 km^{2} (5.5 sq mi)

Population
  - Total: 14,522 (2021 census)
  - Density: 1,023/km^{2} (2,649/sq mi)
- Time zone: UTC+10:00 (AEST)
- Postcode: 4212
Suburbs around Hope Island
Coomera	Coomera	Southern Moreton Bay Islands
Coomera	Hope Island	Southern Moreton Bay Islands
Helensvale	Helensvale	Paradise Point

Hope Island is a suburb in the City of Gold Coast, Queensland, Australia. In the 2021 census, Hope Island had a population of 14,522 people.

There are three towns within the suburb, each established around a real estate development:

- Sanctuary Cove, a gated community in the north of the suburb (27.85562°S 153.35330°E)
- Boykambil in the east of the suburb (27.8716°S 153.3672°E)
- Santa Barbara in the west of the suburb (27.8638°S 153.3458°E)

== Geography ==
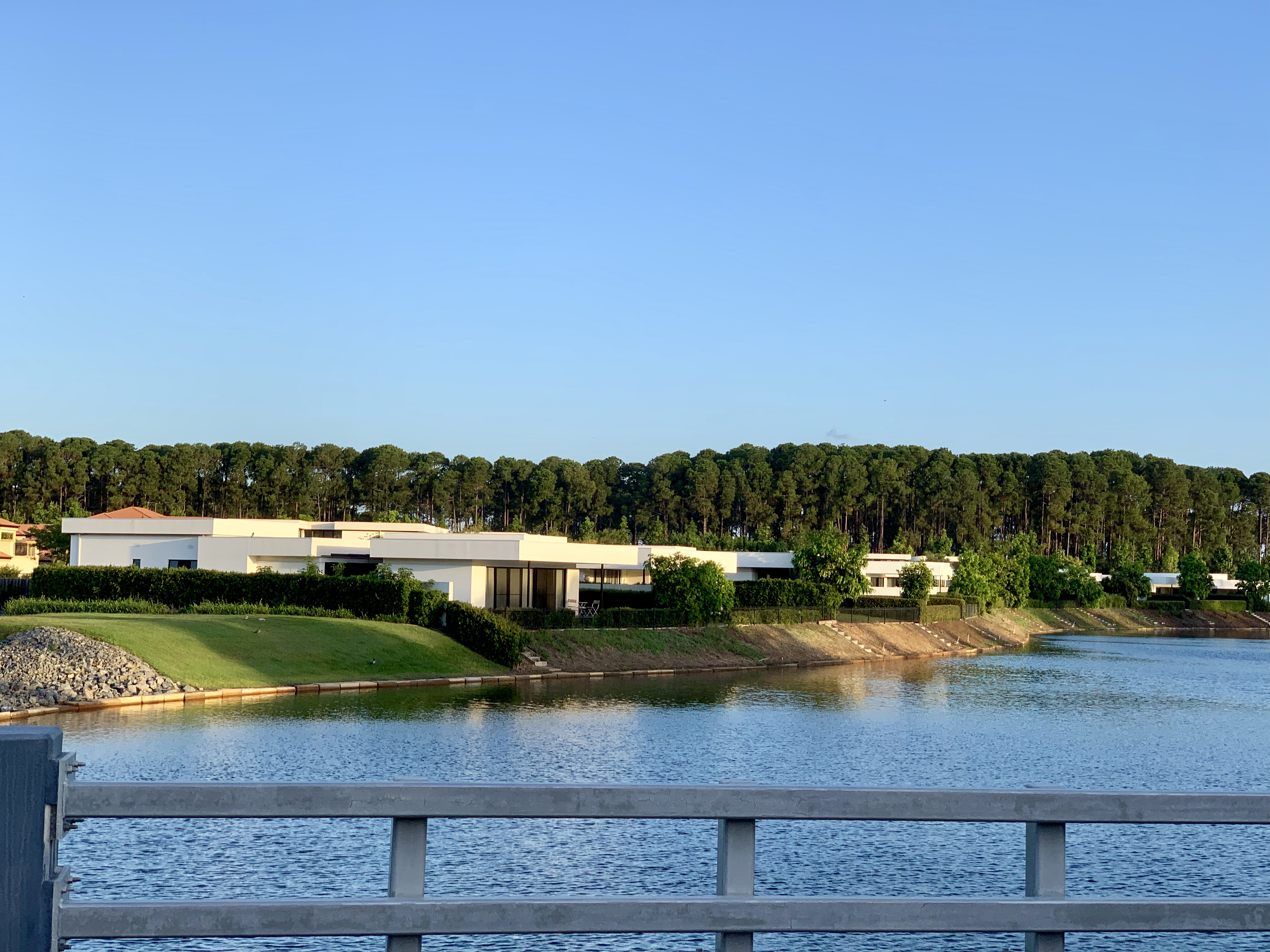
Santa Barbara, 2019

Hope Island is positioned on the northern Gold Coast. It is bounded by the Coomera River to the west, north-west, and north. The river then splits into a northern and southern branch around Coomera Island to east. the southern branch bounds Hope Island to the east. Hope Island is bounded to the south-west and south by Saltwater Creek. The undeveloped Coomera Island lies to the east of Hope Island preventing direct access to Moreton Bay.

Hope Harbour is in the east of the suburb providing boat access to the southern branch of the Coomera River (27.8734°S 153.3760°E).

The Pacific Motorway and Coomera Connector are to the west passing through the neighbouring suburb of Helensvale.

== History ==
The Indigenous name for the area was Boykambil.

The area was named after colonial aristocrat Captain Louis Hope, who in 1867 was granted the island then known as Boykambil near the mouth of the Coomera River in recognition of his contribution in developing the sugar industry in Queensland.

After arriving in Moreton Bay in 1848, Hope spent the next 20 years building sugar plantations on the edge of Moreton Bay. The development of a sugar plantation called ‘Rockholm’ on the Island was largely undertaken by the Grimes family. By the twentieth century, the sugar and arrowroot plantation had passed into the hands of the Sheehan and Davidson families.

== Demographics ==
In the 2016 census, Hope Island had a population of 11,186 people.

In the 2021 census, Hope Island had a population of 14,522 people.

== Education ==
There are no schools in Hope Island. The nearest government primary schools are Coomera State School in neighbouring Coomera to the west and Coombabah State School in Coombabah to the south-east. The nearest government secondary school is Helensvale State High School in neighbouring Helensvale to the south-west.

== Amenities ==
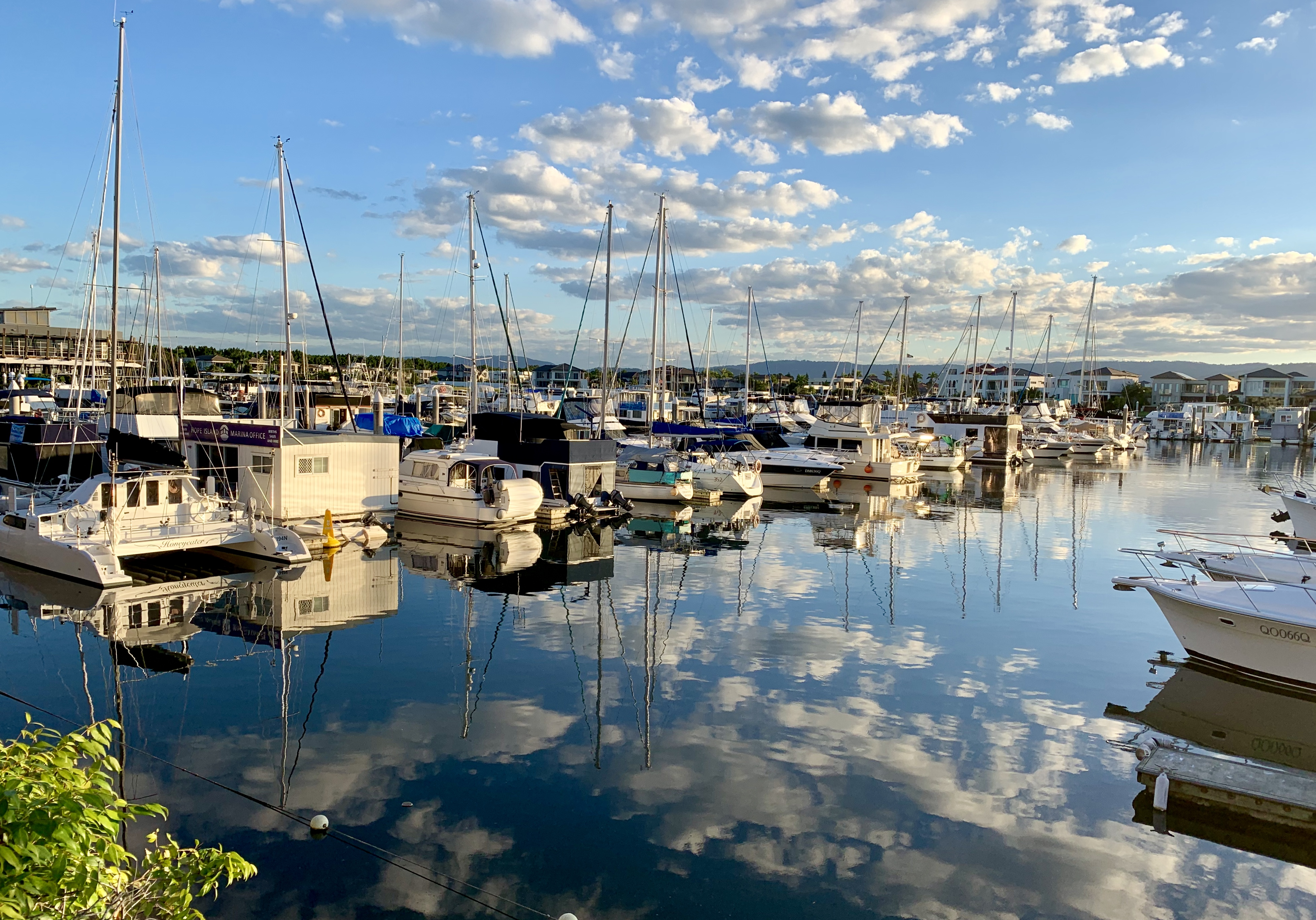
Hope Island Marina, 2019

There are a number of marinas in the suburb, including:

- Hope Harbour Marina in the east of the suburb accessed from the south branch of the Coomera River (27.8687°S 153.3754°E)
- Hope Island Resort Marina, in the west of the suburb accessed from Saltwater Creek (27.8670°S 153.3484°E)
- Sanctuary Cove Marina, in the north of the suburb where Coomer River splits into two branches (27.8520°S 153.3627°E)

There is also a boat ramp and jetty at Boykambil Esplanade South in the south-east of the suburb on the north bank of Coombabah Creek (27.8732°S 153.3780°E). It is managed by the Gold Coast City Council.

== Sport and recreation ==
There are three golf courses:

- Palms Golf Course in the north of the suburb (27.8571°S 153.3612°E)
- Sanctuary Cove Golf & Country Club in the centre of the suburb (27.8648°S 153.3637°E)
- Hope Island Resort Golf Course in the south-west of the suburb (27.8752°S 153.3496°E)
