= Coombabah State School =

Coordinates: 27°53′38.34″S 153°23′16.27″E

- Coombabah, Queensland; Australia

Information
- Type: State primary school
- Motto: Strive To Achieve
- Established: 1981
- Principal: Murray Gleadhill
- Enrolment: 729 (2023)
- Campus: Oxley Drive
- Website: Official site

The School's newsletter.

Coombabah State School is a public co-educational primary school located in the City of Gold Coast suburb of Coombabah, Queensland, Australia. It is administered by the Department of Education, with an enrolment of 729 students and a teaching staff of 54, as of 2023. The school serves students from Prep to Year 6 in the suburbs of Hope Island, Paradise Point, Hollywell, Runaway Bay and Coombabah.

== History ==
The school opened on 27 January 1981 to service the growing population in the area north of Biggera Waters. Classes began at the start of 1981 and were held at Biggera Waters Primary School until the present facilities were constructed. A few months later, Coombabah State relocated to the current school grounds. Coombabah State School was officially opened by Ivan Gibbs on 14 November 1981.

Truancy was identified as a problem for Gold Coast schools, with typically 150 students at Coombabah State being absent each day in August 2009.

== Features of the curriculum ==
- Instrumental music program and a number of performing groups including Band, String Orchestra, Beginner's Strings, and Junior and Senior Choirs. At the 2005 Gold Coast Eisteddfod each of the groups that the school entered were placed, winning four places and a highly commended.
- Japanese culture and language studies in years 6–7.
- Advanced Learning Technology program including use of the Internet. The school was an early innovator in the use of classroom computers, including Logo and laptops.
- The school has two time capsules.
- Integrated studies, comprising society and environment, science, technology, and the arts are taught in all classes throughout the school and are structured around real life learning.

== Notable alumni ==
- Scott Sattler, Rugby league player and manager.

== See also ==
- List of schools in Gold Coast, Queensland
