= Peta-Kaye Croft =

Australian politician

Member of the Queensland Legislative Assembly for Broadwater
- In office 17 February 2001 – 24 March 2012
- Preceded by: Allan Grice
- Succeeded by: Verity Barton

Personal details
- Born: 5 August 1972 (age 54) Mount Isa, Queensland, Australia
- Party: Labor
- Education: Griffith University
- Occupation: Administrative Officer - Griffith University

Peta-Kaye Croft (born 5 August 1972, in Mount Isa) is an Australian Labor Party politician who represented the seat of Broadwater in the Legislative Assembly of Queensland. She entered Parliament at the 2001 election by defeating Allan Grice. She was defeated at the 2012 election by Verity Barton.

She was born in Mount Isa and lived in Townsville and Brisbane during her early years. She was educated on the Gold Coast boarding at St Hilda's School, and graduating from Griffith University with a Bachelor of Arts, majoring in Japanese. Croft is also a qualified swimming instructor and has strong interests in the environment and protecting native flora and fauna.

Parliament of Queensland
| Preceded by Allan Grice | Member for Broadwater; 2001–2012 | Succeeded by Verity Barton |
