= Verity Barton =

Australian politician

Member of the Queensland Legislative Assembly for Broadwater
- In office 24 March 2012 – 25 November 2017
- Preceded by: Peta-Kaye Croft
- Succeeded by: David Crisafulli
- Constituency: Broadwater
- Majority: 7.19%

Personal details
- Born: 6 August 1985 (age 41) Leeds, United Kingdom
- Party: Liberal National Party
- Relations: Clive Hughes (grandfather)
- Profession: Personal assistant, Media officer, retail assistant
- Website: Verity Barton on Facebook

Verity Mary Barton (born 6 August 1985) is an Australian politician. She was the Liberal National Party of Queensland (LNP) member of the Legislative Assembly of Queensland for Broadwater from 2012 to 2017. She defeated Peta-Kaye Croft at the 2012 state election and was re-elected at the 2015 election, before losing LNP preselection for the 2017 election to the then former MP, and current Premier of Queensland, David Crisafulli.

Barton was educated at All Hallows' School in Brisbane. She went on to further studies in law and politics at Bond University on the Gold Coast and Northwestern University School of Law in Chicago, Illinois. Prior to her election she worked in the retail industry and also served as a media consultant for Senator George Brandis.

== Political career ==
Barton joined LNP-predecessor, the former Liberal Party, at 17. She has held various senior local branch positions, including chair of the Broadwater State Electorate Council. She has been a member of the LNP State Council and was a member of the Young LNP Management Committee from 2010 until 2012.

At 26, Barton became the youngest woman ever elected to the Queensland Parliament. Throughout the 54th Parliament, Barton was a member of the Legal Affairs and Community Safety Committee and was appointed as Temporary Chair of Committees, a role which saw her serve as an acting Deputy Speaker in the Parliament.

On 8 January 2015, it was revealed that Barton had her driving licence suspended in both 2012 and 2013 after failing to pay road tolls, and that she had driven while unlicensed. After being reprimanded at LNP headquarters, she issued a statement apologising for her actions and telling her electors that she was still willing to serve them if given the opportunity at the forthcoming election. Queensland Premier Campbell Newman said there was no need to discipline her, despite the 2012 resignation of the then LNP police minister, David Gibson, for driving while his licence was suspended.

In May 2017, Barton lost the LNP preselection for the Broadwater to former Newman Government Minister, David Crisafulli.

== Political positions ==
In her maiden speech to Queensland Parliament, Barton stated she was a "proud conservative" and listed Sir Robert Menzies, Margaret Thatcher, Ronald Reagan and John Howard as her "key political influences." In the same speech, Barton also made reference to her strong Catholic faith.

Barton is a strong monarchist having made a speech to parliament in May 2013 in support of the Succession to the Crown Bill 2013 referencing her admiration of the British royal family and ending her comments with "God bless Queensland, God bless Australia and God save the Queen." She also said it was her dream to marry Prince Harry.

== Personal life ==
Barton is the granddaughter of former member for Kurilpa, Clive Hughes. In 2018, Barton relocated to London.

Parliament of Queensland
Preceded by Peta-Kaye Croft	Member for Broadwater; 2012–2017	Succeeded by David Crisafulli
