= David Crisafulli =

Premier of Queensland since 2024

The Honourable David Crisafulli MP
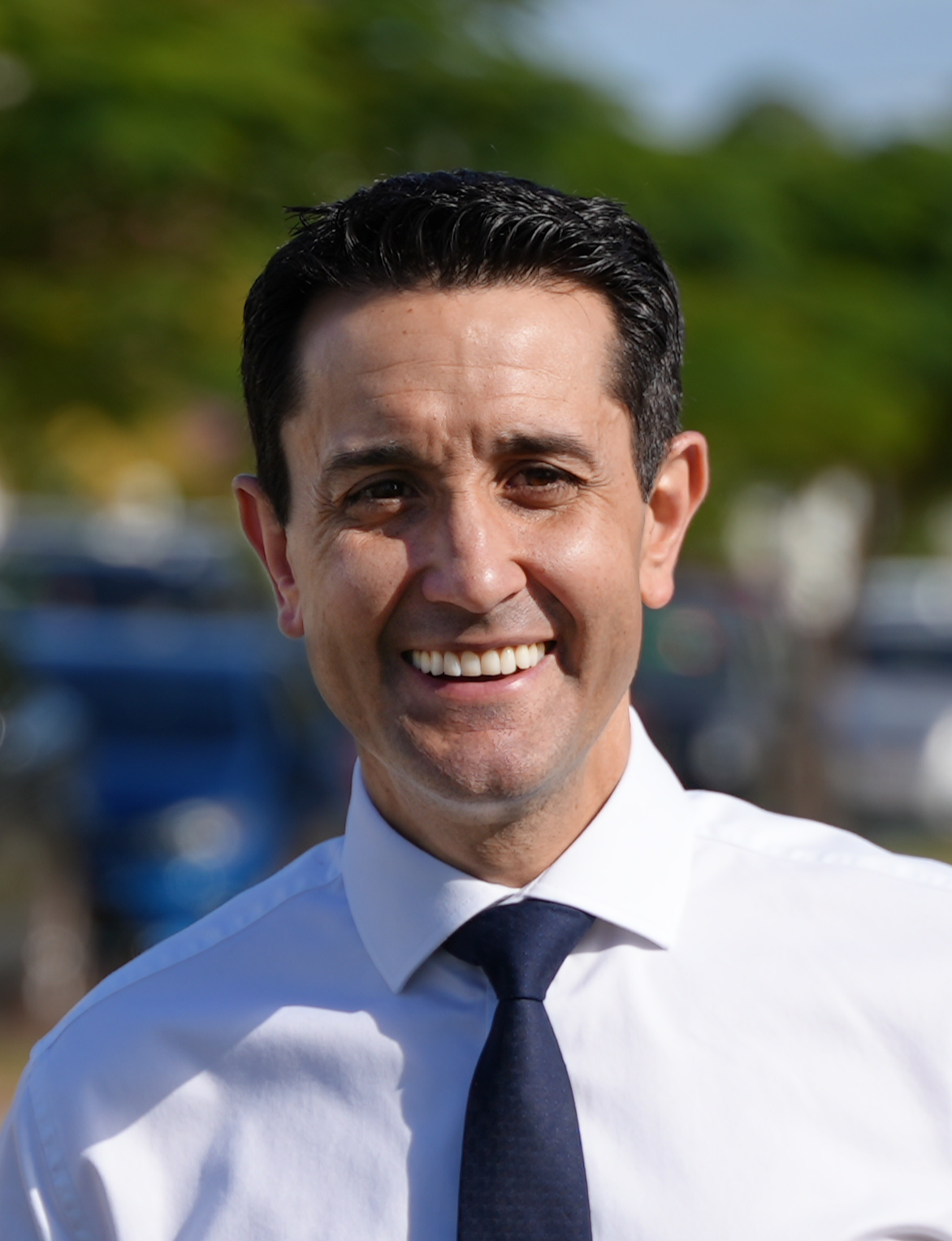
- Crisafulli in 2025

41st Premier of Queensland
- Incumbent
- Assumed office 28 October 2024
- Monarch: Charles III
- Governor: Jeannette Young; Thomas Bradley
- Deputy: Jarrod Bleijie
- Preceded by: Steven Miles

Leader of the Opposition in Queensland
- In office 12 November 2020 – 28 October 2024
- Premier: Annastacia Palaszczuk; Steven Miles
- Deputy: David Janetzki; Jarrod Bleijie
- Preceded by: Deb Frecklington
- Succeeded by: Steven Miles

Leader of the Liberal National Party
- Incumbent
- Assumed office 12 November 2020
- Deputy: David Janetzki; Jarrod Bleijie
- Preceded by: Deb Frecklington

Minister for Local Government
- In office 3 April 2012 – 13 February 2015
- Premier: Campbell Newman
- Preceded by: Paul Lucas
- Succeeded by: Jackie Trad

Member of the Queensland Parliament for Broadwater
- Incumbent
- Assumed office 25 November 2017
- Preceded by: Verity Barton

Member of the Queensland Parliament for Mundingburra
- In office 24 March 2012 – 31 January 2015
- Preceded by: Lindy Nelson-Carr
- Succeeded by: Coralee O'Rourke

Personal details
- Born: 14 April 1979 (age 47) Ingham, Queensland, Australia
- Party: Liberal National
- Spouse: Tegan Crisafulli
- Children: 2
- Website: Government website Party website

David Frank Crisafulli (/ˌkrɪsəˈfʊli/, Italian: [kri.zaˈful.li]; born 14 April 1979) is an Australian politician who has served since 2024 as the 41st premier of Queensland. He holds office as the leader of the Liberal National Party and has been the member of Parliament (MP) for the district of Broadwater since 2017. Crisafulli previously served as a minister in the Newman government and was the MP for the district of Mundingburra from 2012 to 2015.

== Early life ==
Crisafulli was born on 14 April 1979 in Ingham, Queensland. He is one of two children born to Karen and Antonino "Tony" Crisafulli; his parents are both of Italian origin, and thus he speaks some Italian. His father's family originates from the village of Novara di Sicilia in Sicily, Italy. His paternal grandfather Francesco Crisafulli immigrated to Australia in 1960 to work as a cane-cutter and later established his own sugarcane farm on the Herbert River.

Crisafulli was raised in Ingham, where he attended Canossa Primary School and Gilroy Santa Maria College. He graduated with a Bachelor of Journalism degree from James Cook University in Townsville in 2000. While at university he also worked full-time as a cadet reporter at the Herbert River Express.

In 2000, Crisafulli moved into television, becoming a journalist with WIN News in Townsville, and was made chief of staff of the Townsville newsroom in 2002. During that time, he also worked as a correspondent for The Australian and Sunday Mail newspapers, did weekly work for DMG Regional Radio as a newsreader, and lectured in journalism at James Cook University.

== Politics ==
In 2003, Crisafulli was appointed a ministerial media advisor to the then Howard government Minister and Liberal Senator for Queensland, Ian Macdonald. In 2004, Crisafulli successfully stood for what was then the 100% Labor Party-controlled Townsville City Council, on a conservative platform. He became the youngest person ever elected to the council. In 2008, when the Townsville and Thuringowa councils were merged, he stood as a candidate at the first election for the enlarged council. Crisafulli made a deal with Les Tyrell, the former mayor of Thuringowa, to stand in partnership for the mayor and deputy mayor positions; Tyrell won election as mayor and Crisafulli as deputy mayor. He served as deputy mayor until his resignation in 2012 to stand for a seat in the Queensland Parliament. During his second term on Council, he became the chairman of the Townsville City Council Planning Committee.

In the 2012 Queensland state election, Crisafulli was elected to the Legislative Assembly of Queensland in the seat of Mundingburra, as a member of the Liberal National party. He was appointed the Minister for Local Government in the new Newman government. In February 2013, his role was expanded when he became Minister for Local Government, Community Recovery and Resilience. He re-contested Mundingburra at the 2015 Queensland state election but was defeated by the Labor candidate Coralee O'Rourke.

Following his 2015 election loss, Crisafulli and his family relocated to Hope Island on Queensland's Gold Coast. He subsequently ran a small business giving advice about dealing with government and business development opportunities.

In May 2017, he defeated incumbent Broadwater MP Verity Barton for LNP preselection to contest the 2017 election, and subsequently won the Broadwater seat. In December 2017, after the election of Deb Frecklington as Leader of the Opposition, Crisafulli was appointed the Shadow Minister for Environment, Science and the Great Barrier Reef, and Shadow Minister for Tourism.

On 12 November 2020, Crisafulli became Leader of the Opposition in Queensland, after the Liberal National Party elected him as party leader following the resignation of Deb Frecklington.

== Premier of Queensland (2024–present) ==
Crisafulli led the LNP into the 2024 Queensland state election. The LNP gained a 51 seat majority in the Queensland Parliament, and he subsequently became the 41st Premier of Queensland.

Crisafulli was sworn in as Queensland's 41st Premier by Governor Jeannette Young on 28 October, alongside his deputy Jarrod Bleijie. The pair formed an interim ministry, with the full ministry sworn in later that week.

=== Youth crime laws ===
Crisafulli has prioritised curbing youth crimes as part of his electoral campaign promise during his premiership, with the slogan "adult crime, adult time", promising and eventually implementing adult sentences for youth crimes during his premiership, which apply to children as young as ten years of age. The laws have been passed in tranches establishing substantial penalties for an increasing number of crimes, with the first tranche in late 2024 and the second tranche, which increased the number of crimes to 33, in May 2025.

These laws have garnered criticism as being contrary to child rights, including a report from the United Nations special rapporteur on torture criticizing it as "incompatible with basic child rights". Crisafulli has pushed back on the criticism, saying, "Here's my message to the United Nations, 'You don't control me, and I don't answer to you, I answer to Queenslanders'".

=== Queensland Health recruitment corruption allegation ===
On 2 September 2025 Crisafulli was referred to the Queensland Crime and Corruption Commission, Queensland's peak anti-corruption body over allegations that Crisafulli, along with health minister Tim Nicholls, inappropriately intervened to push Queensland Health's senior public servant, Director-General Dr David Rosegren to rescind an offer of employment made to Dr Krispin Hajkowicz for a permanent Chief Health Officer role. The intervention came after discussion from the Premier to Dr Rosegren and resulted in the job offer being withdrawn after the would be candidate had already taken publicity photographs for a draft media release regarding the appointment. Crisafulli stated that he had "advised Rosegren" of "the concerns of the Government", prior to the withdrawal of the role despite the expert recruitment panel identifying Dr Hajkowicz as the preferred candidate. The submission to the CCC alleged that Crisafulli intervened to block the appointment in order to punish Dr Hajkowicz for his wife's political views, after she made a submission to Parliament regarding laws exempting the future Brisbane Olympic stadium from legal oversight. Acting Premier David Janetzki refused to comment on the investigation.

=== Gender-affirming care ===
In 2025, under Crisafulli's leadership, Minister for Health Tim Nicholls announced an immediate pause on new prescriptions of puberty-blocking medication and cross-sex hormones for patients under 18, citing an internal review into the practices of the Cairns Sexual Health Service. Following protest and a legal challenge from the parent of a transgender teenager, the Supreme Court of Queensland overturned the directive on 27 October 2025 on the grounds that Nicholls and Queensland Health Director David Rosengren had failed to adequately consult Queensland's health and hospital services before announcing the ban. The ban was legally reinstated just hours later by Nicholls under a new directive. The LNP government faced criticism from experts and activists for the directive, including an independent November 2025 review by Victoria's former chief psychiatrist Dr Ruth Vine, and for its decision to withhold review on the ban until the projected 2031 outcome of a UK clinical trial.

=== Natural areas ===
In 2025, the state government added 8,700 hectares to Queensland's national park and nature refuge system, including 6,000 hectares within the Wet Tropics World Heritage Area.

=== Ministerial extramarital affair integrity crisis ===
In May 2025 a integrity crisis engulfed the Crisafulli government when it was revealed that two of his ministers, the Olympic and Sports Minister, 64 year old Tim Mander, and 47 year old Child Safety Minister Amanda Camm, had engaged in an extramarital affair for two years prior to Mander divorcing his wife Gayle Mander in 2025. Crisafulli had been warned about their affair by Gayle Mander's sister, who sent Crisafulli a letter in June 2025 exposing the affair and expressing concern that the Ministerial Code of Conduct had been breached. The secret relationship was only made public in July 2025, following the warning sent to Crisafulli. Journalists and opposition members of Parliament raised integrity concerns regarding ministerial decisions that Mander had made that involved Camm's electorate, the most significant being to change the location of the 2032 Summer Olympics sailing event to a location in Camm's electorate of Whitsunday, by removing it from the electorate of Lytton, which is held by opposition member Joan Pease of the Australian Labor Party.

Journalists posed questions to Crisafulli regarding the affair but Crisafulli refused to answer, and did not hold a press conference in Brisbane for several weeks after the warning was made public. He eventually relented, stating that he was only made aware when the pair declared their relationship to cabinet in July 2025. Journalists reported that a member of the Liberal National Party of Queensland had also warned the future Premier about the affair in a phone call in December 2023 and that it had been an open secret in the Party as early as February 2022.

Crisafulli, Camm and Mander were referred to the Crime and Corruption Commission, Queensland's corruption watchdog, in May 2026. Camm and Mander had refused to reveal if they had sought integrity commissioner advice. Crisafulli had refused to answer media questions about if he had encouraged the ministers to seek advice from the integrity commissioner.

=== Tim Mander referral to Australian Federal Police ===
The aftermath of the affair saw Mander referred to the Australian Electoral Commissioner. The request to the Commissioner was to investigate potential breaches of the Electoral Act and Criminal Code for giving false and misleading documents or information, in regard to his electoral enrolment address. On 19 May 2026 the Australian Electoral Commissioner referred Mander to the Australian Federal Police because he had enrolled to vote at the address of a staff member but had not provided the AEC with evidence that he had resided there. Deputy Opposition leader Cameron Dick demanded that Mander be stood down by Premier Crisafulli. Crisafulli made no statement on the referral until 21 May 2026, when Mander voluntarily resigned from Cabinet. Tourism Minister Andrew Powell took on Mander's ministerial duties for the Sport and Olympics portfolios.

=== Gaza war protests and phrase bans ===
In March 2026, as a reaction to the 2025 Bondi Beach shooting and ongoing Gaza war protests in Australia, the Crisafulli government amended the Queensland Criminal Code to allow the prohibition of two pro-Palestine phrases, "from the river to the sea" and "globalise the intifada". The phrases were described by Crisafulli and Attorney-General of Queensland Deb Frecklington as antisemitic "terrorist slogans". This action was condemned by pro-Palestinian activists, including the Human Rights Law Centre, as being authoritarian and an example of democratic backsliding. The Queensland Council for Civil Liberties criticised on free speech and freedom to protest grounds. The Queensland Jewish Board of Deputies welcomed the legislation. The activist group Justice for Palestine Magan-djin announced their intention to challenge the constitutional validity of the ban in the High Court. A lawsuit was filed by seven protestors in the High Court of Australia in July challenging the laws.

=== Koala habitat destruction approval ===
In July 2026 Crisafulli intervened in local Government planning approval in order to fast track an expansion for the Dreamworld amusement park on the Gold Coast. The area is a Koala habitat that has recently been surveyed with a confirmed population of the animals in 2025. The approval allows Dreamworld to clear the dense native trees and vegetation located north of the existing facility that runs along the Oaky creek.

=== Cairns blackmail suppression order ===
In May 2026 a political & legal scandal began in Cairns, Queensland that engulfed the Crisafulli Government due to questions over the ongoing costs of the Queensland Police fighting to maintain a gag order, Government secrecy, open justice and freedom of the press. The extortion case saw a man, who the court gave the pseudonym "ABC", accused of attempting to extort his former partner with a threat to reveal an alleged romantic affair the woman had in 2017 with a male, high profile Queensland public figure who was given the pseudonym "MM". This high profile man, "MM" was named in court by the woman during a hearing. A civilian who was in the courtroom for an unrelated matter posted the name of the high profile man on social media.

Acting Magistrate Gelma Meoli, who was presiding over the court, took leave of the court for approximately 40 minutes. When she returned, Meoli issued a blanket suppression order over the entire case and requested the case be moved to a senior prosecutor. The unrelated civilian who had published the name was ordered by a senior police detective to remove the posts, which he did, but not before the name had been disseminated on the internet. He was later raided by police, charged for publication of identifying information in proceedings and his own identity was suppressed.

The high profile, married man, "MM", is not facing any charges himself and was not part of the legal proceedings of the case. Due to the name being published before the gag order, the identity of "MM" was described by Michael Berkman, a Queensland MP as "the worst kept secret" in Queensland politics and that he himself knew the identity.

Queensland Police and the Liberal-National Government have refused to state how much the Government were paying senior counsel, including Jonathan Horton KC, to argue on their behalf to maintain the suppression order. Meaghan Scanlon raised a point of order in a Parliamentary estimates committee to declare that "people have a right to know the cost of the King’s Counsel to protect the identity of the reported high-profile man". Deputy Speaker Jon Krause moved the session into the disused Legislative Council of Queensland chamber and closed the hearing to the public. Krause also refused to allow any questions from Berkman, the only crossbench member of the committee. Under the whole of government policy for engaging barristers, senior counsel being paid over $5,000 per day must be approved by the Attorney-General of Queensland, currently Deb Frecklington, with Frecklingon telling Parliament that "her approval had not been sought" for payments above the cap. Dan Purdie, Queensland Minister for Police was asked by the media about the cost to taxpayers of the barristers but refused to answer, referring the question to the Queensland Police, who also would not answer.

Media organisations including the Australian Broadcasting Corporation argued for the removal of the suppression order but the magistrate ruled in favour of the Queensland Police service. They appealed the decision. Justice James Henry of the Supreme Court of Queensland held a behind closed doors hearing on 31 July 2026, reserving his decision for a later date while maintaining the non-publication order. Premier Crisafulli made no public statement regarding the scandal in May or July.

== Political views ==
Crisafulli claims and describes his political views as centrist and decentralist.

Crisafulli opposes allowing trans women to compete against women in sport and voted for an unsuccessful bill tabled by Katter's Australian Party (KAP) leader Robbie Katter that sought to ban trans women from playing women's sports in Queensland.

Crisafulli personally opposed the Indigenous Voice to Parliament, but decided not to campaign against it and members of the LNP were given a free vote on the issue.

Crisafulli has said, that in the event he was elected as premier, he would not roll back Indigenous treaty legislation. This was despite facing pressure from the LNP grassroots to do so. However, on 19 October 2023, a few days after the 2023 Australian Indigenous Voice referendum Crisafulli announced the LNP will be dropping its support for Treaty.

Crisafulli opposed the Termination of Pregnancy Bill 2018, which decriminalised abortion in Queensland, and the Voluntary Assisted Dying Bill 2021, which legalised voluntary assisted dying. Both Bills were passed in conscience votes (50–41 and 60–29 respectively). During the 2024 election campaign, he stated he supported a "woman's right to choose" and noted that six years had passed since the bill was voted on.

After becoming Premier, Crisafulli banned discussions and debate on abortion in parliament for four years.

Crisafulli is a sceptic of nuclear energy, despite the federal opposition Coalition's affirmative stance towards modular nuclear reactors.

Crisafulli promised during the 2024 election campaign to implement solitary confinement for young offenders in an effort to lower Juvenile delinquency. as well as subsequent legislation as Premier.

== Personal life ==
Crisafulli lives in Bulimba, Queensland with his wife Tegan and their two children. He does not maintain a residence inside of his electorate. He owns a cane farm near Ingham, Queensland, located approximately halfway between Cairns in the north and Townsville to the south. He is a supporter of the North Queensland Cowboys rugby league club and the Gold Coast Suns in the Australian Football League.

Political offices
Preceded by Deb Frecklington	Leader of the Opposition in Queensland; 2020–2024	Succeeded by Steven Miles
Preceded by Steven Miles	Premier of Queensland; 2024–present	Incumbent
Parliament of Queensland
Preceded by Lindy Nelson-Carr	Member for Mundingburra; 2012–2015	Succeeded by Coralee O'Rourke
Preceded by Verity Barton	Member for Broadwater; 2017–present	Incumbent
Party political offices
Preceded by Deb Frecklington	Leader of the Liberal National Party; 2020–present	Incumbent
