= Electoral district of Bonney =

State electoral district of Queensland, Australia

Bonney Queensland—Legislative Assembly
- Map of Bonney, 2017.
- State: Queensland
- Dates current: 2017–present
- MP: Sam O'Connor
- Party: Liberal National Party
- Namesake: Maude Bonney
- Electors: 35,534 (2020)
- Area: 29 km^{2} (11.2 sq mi)
- Demographic: Inner-metropolitan
- Coordinates: 27.9488°S 153.3819°E
Electorates around Bonney:
Theodore	Broadwater	Broadwater
Gaven	Bonney	Surfers Paradise
Gaven	Southport	Surfers Paradise

Bonney is an electoral district of the Legislative Assembly in the Australian state of Queensland. It was created in the 2017 redistribution and was first contested in the 2017 Queensland state election. It was named after pioneer aviator Maude Bonney.

Located on the Gold Coast, Bonney consists of the suburbs of Biggera Waters, Arundel, Parkwood, Labrador and the northern area of Southport.

== Members for Bonney ==
Member	Party	Term
Sam O'Connor	Liberal National	2017–present

== Election results ==
2024 Queensland state election: Bonney
Party	Candidate	Votes	%	±%
Liberal National	Sam O'Connor	16,560	54.32	+1.06
Labor	Kyle Kelly-Collins	7,988	26.20	−5.87
Greens	Amin Javanmard	2,880	9.45	+1.75
One Nation	Scott Philip	2,305	7.56	+3.69
Family First	Maria Theresia Rossouw	752	2.47	+2.47
Total formal votes		30,485	95.26	−0.97
Informal votes		795	4.5	+0.97
Turnout		32,002	84.30	
Two-party-preferred result
Liberal National	Sam O'Connor	19,409	63.67	+3.60
Labor	Kyle Kelly-Collins	11,076	36.33	−3.60
Liberal National hold		Swing	+3.60	

== See also ==
- Electoral districts of Queensland
- Members of the Queensland Legislative Assembly by year
- Category:Members of the Queensland Legislative Assembly by name
