= Coombabah State High School =

Public school in Queensland, Australia

Information
- Established: 1986; 40 years ago
- Enrollment: c. 1,200

Coombabah State High School is a public secondary school located in the northern suburb of Coombabah on the Gold Coast, Queensland, in Australia. The campus is situated on Pine Ridge Road, backing onto the Coombabah Lakelands Conversation Area.

== Overview ==
The current principal is Chris Kern. Over 1,200 students attend Coombabah High and feeder schools include Coombabah State Primary School, Biggera Waters State Primary School, Labrador State Primary School & Arundel State Primary School and also Helensvale State Primary School. It intakes students from the greater Gold Coast area.

It opened in 1986, with a student population of approximately 670 students in Years 8, 9 and 11. Years 10 and 12 were introduced in 1987, and enrolments continued to grow, reaching a peak of approximately 1700 in 1989. The first principal was Kevin Bowden, who was assisted by Carmel Gomm as Deputy Principal and Dorothy Dwyer as Senior Mistress. In 2011, Coombabah High celebrated its 25th anniversary.

== Rugby League program ==
Coombabah High is affiliated with NRL club the Canberra Raiders and the program is extremely strong at Coombabah. The Rugby league excellence cohort is coached by Rod Pryor, Scott Marlow, Brett Timmis and former first grade Penrith Panthers winger, Rod Wright. In 2007 the Year 9 team participated in the South East Queensland competition the Michael Hancock cup and reached the Grand Final, which was played at Suncorp Stadium as a curtain-raiser to a Brisbane Broncos match. Coombabah lost to Palm Beach Currumbin High School. This year Coombabah participates in the Steve Renouf Year 8 competition, Michael Hancock Year 9 competition, Kevin Walters Year 10 competition and the Opens play in the Titans Cup, and Andrew Gee Shield. This year the Under 14s have won the Michael Hancock Competition for the first time. This year the school had six Queensland Representatives in Mitcham Ardler, Edward Brimelow, Jerremiah Nia, Nathan Wilson, Grant Davies (union) and Bryson Rukuwai (union).

== Notable alumni ==
=== Media ===
- Talitha Cummins, journalist

=== Sport ===
- Casey O'Neill, mixed martial arts
- Brendan Piakura, rugby league
- Scott Sattler, rugby league
- Jeremy Smith, rugby league
- Tim Smith, rugby league
- Taine Tuaupiki, rugby league
