= Electoral district of Broadwater =

State electoral district of Queensland, Australia

Broadwater Queensland—Legislative Assembly
- Map of the electoral district of Broadwater, 2017
- State: Queensland
- MP: David Crisafulli
- Party: Liberal National Party
- Namesake: Nerang River Estuary
- Electors: 35,120 (2020)
- Area: 130 km^{2} (50.2 sq mi)
- Demographic: Inner-metropolitan
- Coordinates: 27°51′S 153°24′E
Electorates around Broadwater:
Redlands	Oodgeroo	Coral Sea
Coomera	Broadwater	Coral Sea
Theodore	Bonney	Surfers Paradise

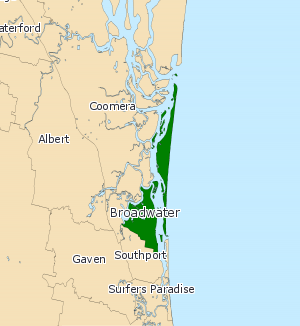
2008 map of Broadwater

Broadwater is an electoral district of the Legislative Assembly in the Australian state of Queensland. It was created at the 1991 redistribution.

The electorate is based on the northern end of the Gold Coast. It includes South Stradbroke Island as well as Labrador, Paradise Point, Runaway Bay and Sanctuary Cove and Coombabah.

Since 2017 the member for Broadwater has been David Crisafulli, who is the leader of the Liberal National Party and the Premier of Queensland.

== Members for Broadwater ==
Member	Party	Term
Allan Grice	National	1992–2001
Peta-Kaye Croft	Labor	2001–2012
Verity Barton	Liberal National	2012–2017
David Crisafulli	Liberal National	2017–present

== Election results ==
2024 Queensland state election: Broadwater
Party	Candidate	Votes	%	±%
Liberal National	David Crisafulli	20,916	63.99	+4.40
Labor	Tamika Hicks	7,022	21.48	−5.05
One Nation	Steven Whitehead	2,244	6.87	+0.94
Greens	Simon Margan	1,615	4.94	−0.28
Family First	Peter Edwards	889	2.72	+2.72
Total formal votes		32,686	96.70	−0.09
Informal votes		1,114	3.30	+0.09
Turnout		33,800	88.42	−0.73
Two-party-preferred result
Liberal National	David Crisafulli	23,311	71.32	+4.75
Labor	Tamika Hicks	9,375	28.68	−4.75
Liberal National hold		Swing	+4.75	

Primary vote results in Broadwater (Parties with less than 5% of the vote are omitted)
Liberal National
Liberal
National
Labor
Greens
One Nation
Palmer United/United Australia Party
Katter's Australian
View source data.
Two-party-preferred vote vote results in Broadwater View source data.
