= Gold Coast central business district =

Coordinates: 27.9951°S 153.4143°E

Gold Coast CBD
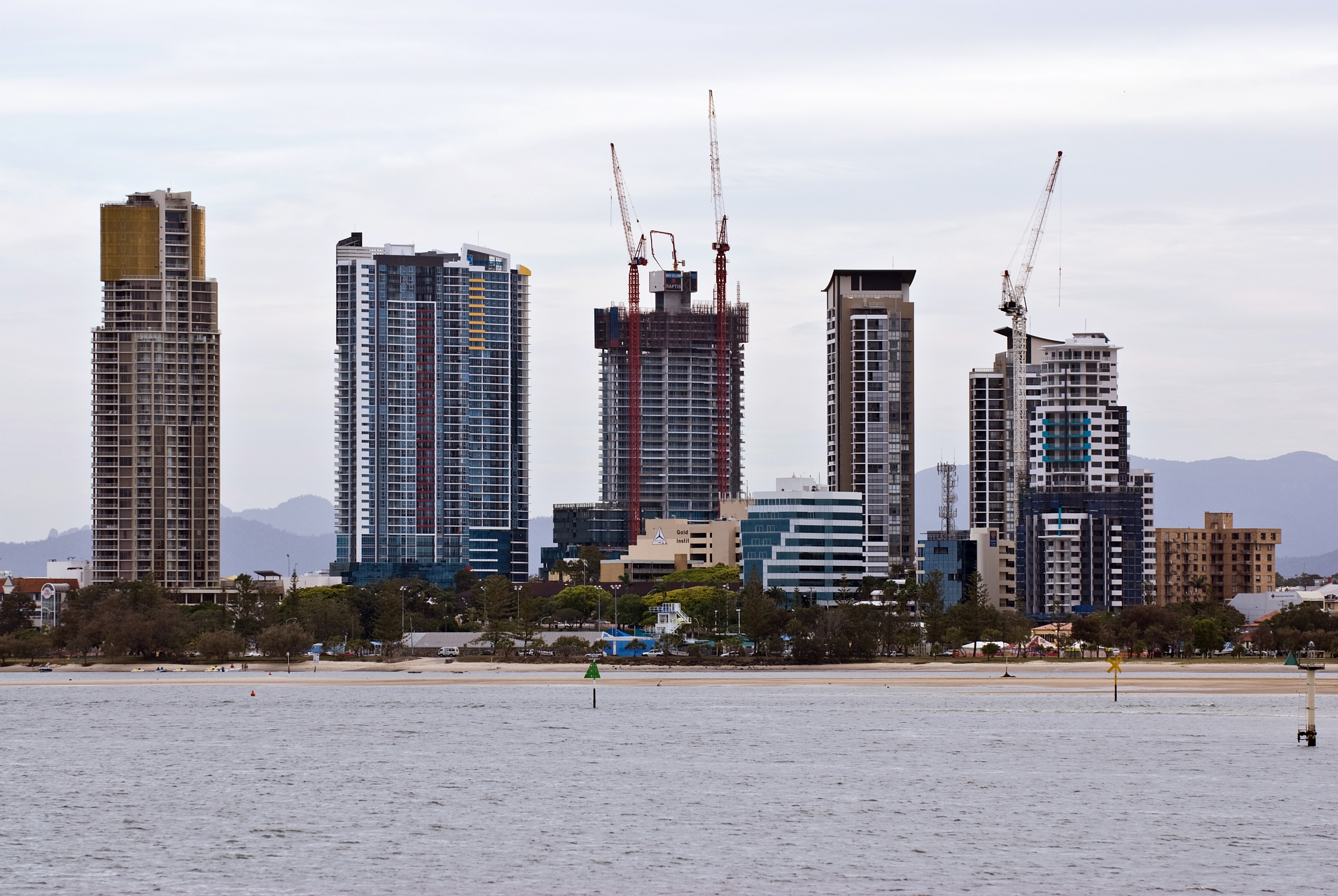
- Country: Australia
- State: Queensland
- City: Gold Coast
- LGA: City of Gold Coast

Government
  - State electorate: Southport
  - Federal division: Moncrieff

Area
  - Total: 1.9 km^{2} (0.73 sq mi)
- Postcode: 4215

The Gold Coast central business district (CBD) is the main commercial centre of the Gold Coast, Queensland, Australia. The CBD area encompasses an eastern portion of the Southport suburb. Its north–south axis runs from North Street in the north to Brighton Parade in the south. Its east–west axis runs from Broadwater in the east to the High Street in the west.

== Geography ==
The Gold Coast CBD is located in an eastern portion of the suburb of Southport. It is bordered by High Street to the west and extends as far north as North Street. To the east it is bordered by the Broadwater and extends as far south as Brighton Parade. Nerang Street is considered to be the Main Street or the primary business street of the CBD.

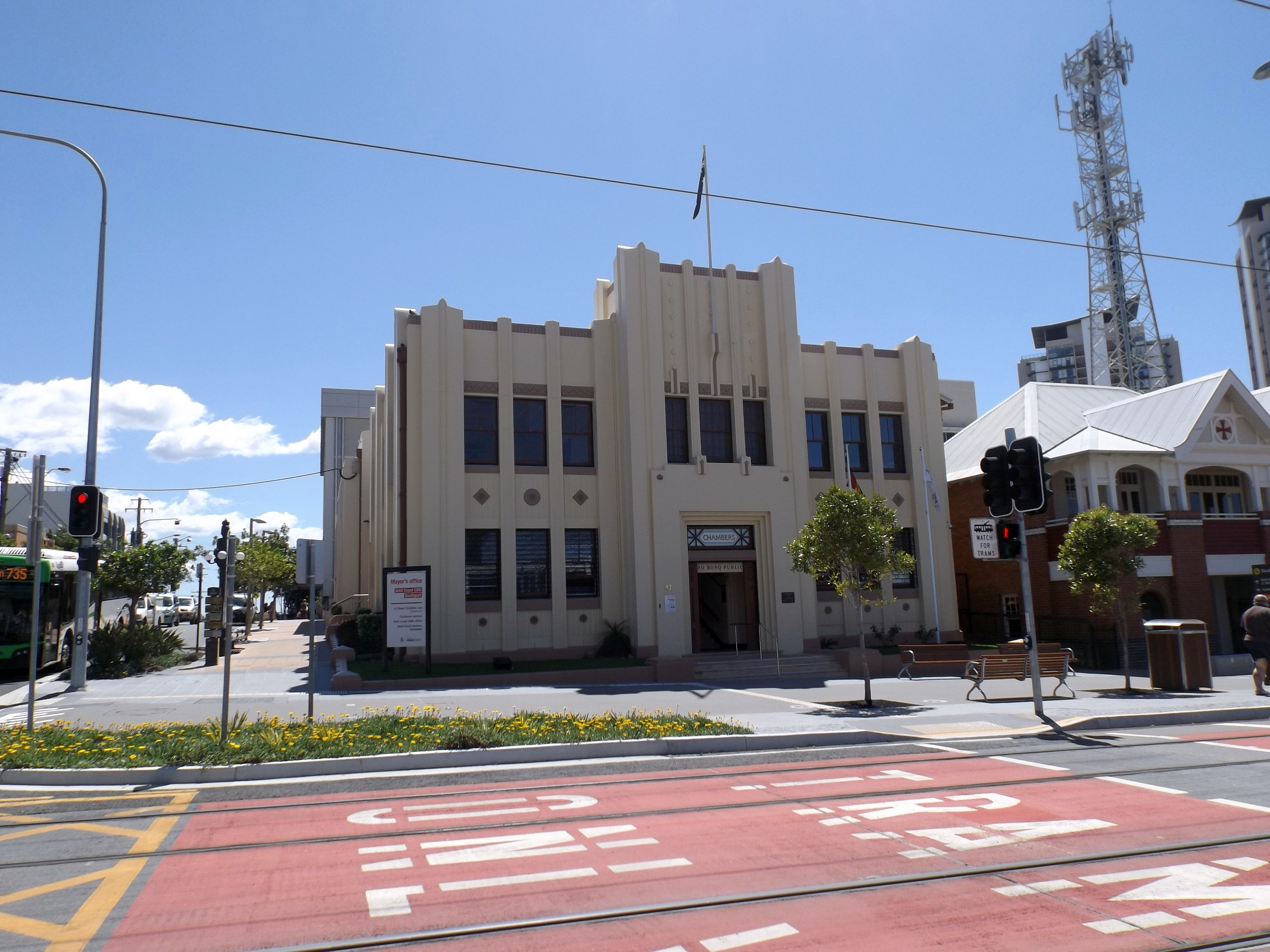
Town Hall on Nerang Street in 2015.

== History ==
Archaeological evidence suggests Indigenous Australians inhabited the area for more than ten thousand years before European settlement. The Indigenous tribe that lived in the area were known as the Kombumerri clan and spoke the Yugambeh dialect. The Kombumerri people named the area Goo-een. In 1869, Richard Gardiner became the first European to settle in the area, which was known as Nerang Creek Heads at the time. Gardiner built a house and wharf on the river end of Queen Street which later led to the Loder family and several others following his lead and building in the area. The settlement was surveyed in 1874 and the area was renamed Southport because it was the southernmost port of the colony of Queensland and took inspiration from the English seaside town. In 1877 German immigrant Johan Meyer acquired James Beattie's land at Narrow Neck and started a private ferry service that transported Southport residents to the beachside area that was named Elston shortly after. Meyer's Ferry operated just south of Queen Street on Meyer's Ferry Road and would take travelers across the Nerang River to Elston's Meyer's Ferry Road. In 1878 Richard Gardner opened the Southport Hotel, the town's first pub.

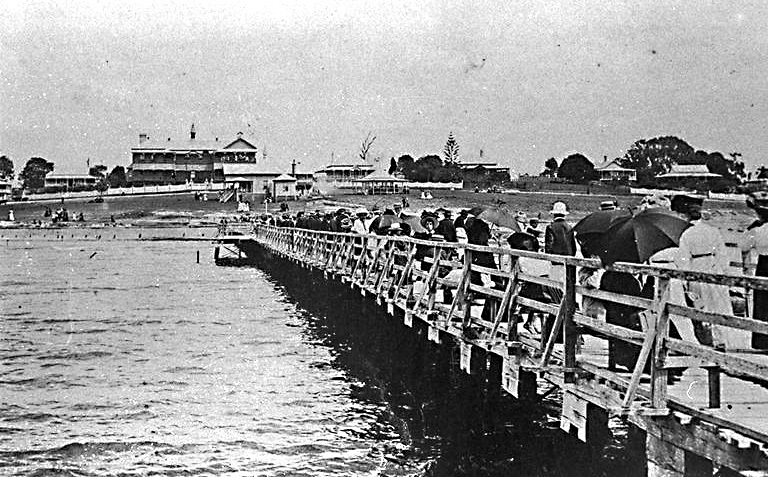
The Southport Pier in 1910.

On 28 November 1883, the Southport Pier was opened in the sheltered Broadwater. The newly created pier allowed steamboats to unload cargo and passengers. As a result, the coastal area of Southport gained the reputation of being a fashionable seaside resort for Brisbane's wealthy and influential but was only accessible by boat for the most part. In 1885 then Governor of Queensland Anthony Musgrave built a seaside house in Southport, further affirming the town's reputation as a destination for Queensland's wealthy and influential. A railway extension to the Southport township opened in 1889 and numerous hotels were soon established along the coastline. In 1901 the residents of Southport celebrated Federation and had grown to a permanent population of 1230. In 1922 the Queensland Government purchased a Nerang Street site for £1737 and opened the Gold Coast Hospital shortly after.

On 28 November 1925, the township of Southport had existed for 50 years. The day was declared a public holiday as the town began jubilee celebrations. The first event of the day saw the Queensland Lieutenant-Governor William Lennon officially open the Jubilee Bridge which extended from Queen Street, Southport to Main Beach Parade, Main Beach. The bridge provided easy access to a beach for Southport residents and the connecting suburb was consequently named Main Beach.

The Southport Town Hall was constructed in 1935 on the corner of Davenport and Nerang Streets by the Southport Town Council. On 9 December 1948, a major reorganisation of local government in South East Queensland saw the towns of Southport and Coolangatta amalgamate to create the Town of South Coast. Most locals felt the new name did not represent the area well and pushed for a change. The town was nicknamed Gold Coast in the 1950s and on 23 October 1958 the Town of South Coast officially changed its name to Town of Gold Coast. On 16 May 1959 it became City of Gold Coast.

Although the city had experienced several name changes and extending of boundaries by the 1960s, Southport was still considered to be the major hub for businesses on the Gold Coast.

=== CBD status recognition ===
The CBD area was officially declared a priority development area on 4 October 2013 by the Queensland Minister for Economic Development. Following the announcement, many high rises began springing up inside the CBD boundaries as the revitalisation of the area began to take shape. By mid-2014, Gold Coast Mayor Tom Tate claimed that Southport had always been the traditional central business district of the Gold Coast and believed more than 15% of Gold Coast residents would work inside the CBD boundaries in the near future.

=== Revitalisation ===
In July 2015, Gold Coast City Council figures showed $2.5 billion of developments had been submitted towards the revitalisation of the CBD. The recently completed Sundale Tower is the tallest building in the CBD at 55-stories. A 104-storey tower known as Imperial City has been proposed inside the CBD boundaries but is yet to be approved. The tower would be the tallest residential building in the southern hemisphere should it be approved. FIBA Oceania relocated to the Southport Central building inside the CBD boundaries in August 2015.

In August 2017, it was revealed Gold Coast Mayor Tom Tate had submitted a proposal to the Queensland Government to allow a tender process to build a casino resort on a seven hectare CBD site on the corners of Queen and Scarborough Streets. In late 2017, City of Gold Coast announced a new CBD Program that aimed to revitalise the area by 2025. Plans are currently underway to construct the $60 million Gold Coast Arena within the CBD boundaries at the western edge where the historic Owen Park site is currently situated.

In April 2021, Tom Tate revealed the $380 million 'Towers of Power' project for the CBD which was designed to house all of the city's government and legal workers as well as new supreme and federal courts.

== Governance ==
Administratively, the Gold Coast CBD falls under the authority of the local government area of City of Gold Coast. The Mayor of the Gold Coast is based at the Southport Town Hall along Nerang Street inside the CBD boundaries. The Queensland state government also has authority over some aspects of the CBD. Hinze Street is considered the legal district of the CBD as it houses the Southport Courthouse, the Southport Police Station and the Southport Watch House as well as the city's official legal aid office.

== Culture ==
=== Broadwater Parklands ===
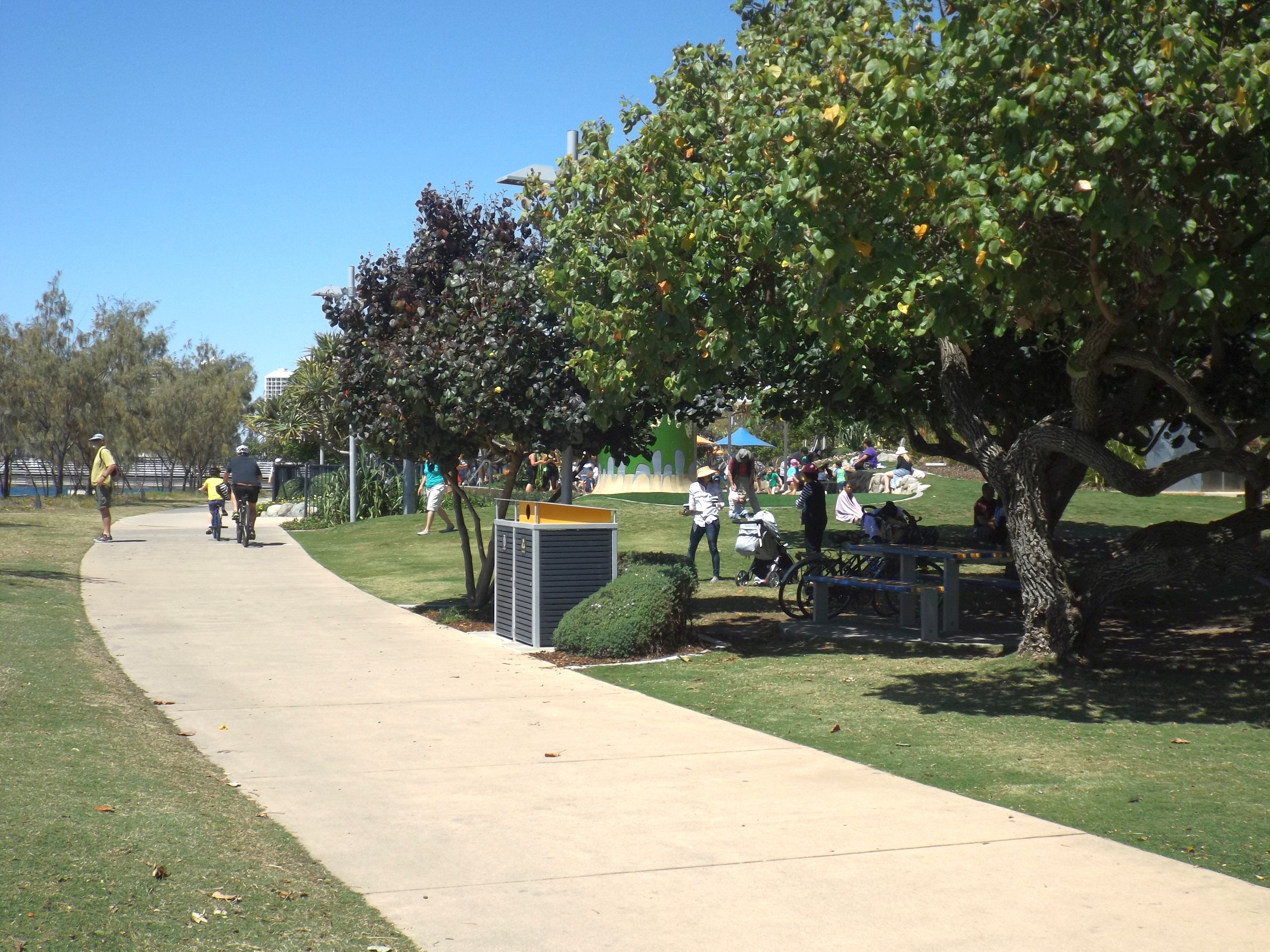
The Broadwater Parklands in 2015.

In November 1928 the Parklands along the Southport Broadwater were declared public space. The area featured public baths and a pier at the time but most aspects were eventually removed. The addition of the Southport Pool in the 1960s further drew visitors to the area. The Queensland Government and Gold Coast City Council began consultation for the redevelopment of the parklands in 2005. By late 2007 the final master plan was released and it was revealed that the stage 1 redevelopment would cost $42 million. Construction of stage 1 began in March 2008 and the finished product opened to the public on 23 August 2009. Construction of stage 2 began shortly after the opening of stage 1 and was completed in December 2010 at a cost of $17 million. After a few years break, construction of stage 3 began in January 2015 and will cost $10.5 million. The third stage was opened to the public on 28 February 2016. In 2022, a large playground was constructed, consisting of a main tower, with a large slide going through the middle, as well as a swing set, trampolines, a water play area and more.

=== Chinatown ===
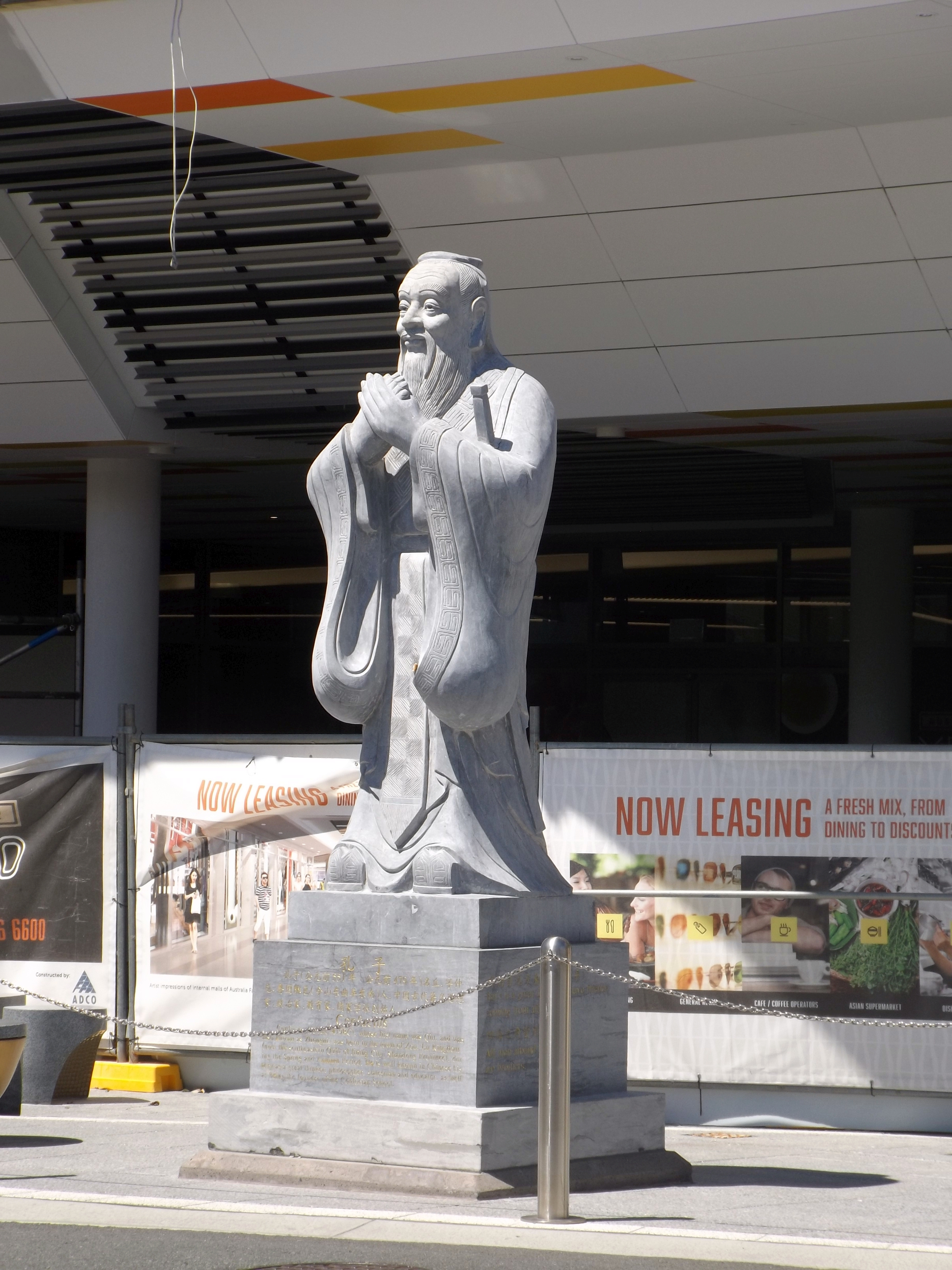
Confucius statue in Chinatown.

Gold Coast's Chinatown is located in the CBD, focused on Davenport Street and Young Street, and includes the block boundaries of Nerang, Scarborough and Garden Streets. Gold Coast Chinatown is a unique and modern precinct that provides a place for the Gold Coast to celebrate its diversity through culture, design, people and food. The precinct is continuously evolving with new Asian-inspired businesses, restaurants, cultural embellishments, and offers something different on the first Saturday of every month when its streets come alive with a range of exciting events such as free films, popup bars, multicultural celebrations and the much loved Chinatown Street Markets.

=== Education ===
St Hilda's School is the only non-tertiary educational institution located inside the CBD boundaries. St Hilda's opened in 1912 and is a Prep to 12, independent, all girls school located on High Street. Other schools located just outside the CBD boundaries include The Southport School (TSS), Keebra Park State High School, Southport State School and Southport State High School. St Hilda's and TSS are members of the prestigious Great Public Schools Association and Queensland Girls' Secondary Schools Sports Association with the top Brisbane schools.

Tertiary education inside the CBD boundaries is provided by Evocca College, Gold Coast Institute of TAFE and Central Queensland University.

=== Religion ===
There are two major religious institutions inside the CBD boundaries and both are a denomination of the Christian faith. The Guardian Angels Catholic Church was established in 1882 along Scarborough Street and is the oldest church in the CBD. Shortly after St. Peter's Anglican Church was built in 1887 on the corner of High Street and Nerang Street.

=== Theatre ===
In 1882, the Southport School of Arts was erected on the corner of Lawson and Scarborough Streets. The school included for 200 people, a stage, dressing rooms and a library. By the early 1900s, the residents of Southport had established a strong interest in the arts and cinematography. Three theatres were built inside the modern day CBD boundaries and were owned by the Thams Brothers. The Regent Theatre, located on Davenport Street, opened in 1912 and was the Gold Coast's first cinema. Due to demand, the theatre was expanded between 1918-1920 and increased its capacity to 1000 seats. Further demand saw the Pier Theatre open in 1926 which sat over the Broadwater. The Pier Theatre quickly became a very popular venue for pastimes in Southport. A third cinema, Savoy Theatre, was also opened shortly after on the eastern side of Nerang Street.

In December 1938, President Norman Woodroffe handed over the keys of the Southport School of Arts to the Returned Servicemen's League. In 1950 the Gold Coast Little Theatre was formed and moved into their current Scarborough Street premises in 1964. The Gold Coast Little Theatre is the only remaining theatre in the CBD.

=== Heritage Walk ===
The Gold Coast City Council developed a Southport CBD Heritage Walk in 2008 and 2009. Information was gathered by a "Call for Stories" competition with the community. The CBD loop takes 30 minutes and passes the Town Hall, the Catholic Church and the former railway station among other historical sites.

== Retail ==
The Sundale Shopping Centre, which opened on 26 March 1969, was the first of its kind on the Gold Coast costing a record $7.5M but closed in 1989 after the larger Australia Fair shopping centre opened nearby. It was located on 5 hectares (12 acres) of prime real estate facing the Broadwater which was previously the site of the popular Southport Hotel. As well as providing panoramic views of the Nerang River from the upper floor, it was home to Queensland's first Big W department store as well as a cinema, restaurants, 45 speciality stores and a 7,000-vehicle car park. It was proposed as a location for the building of the Gold Coast Convention Centre. Such a development would have rejuvenated the old administrative centre of the Gold Coast. However, it lost its bid to Broadbeach, in part because of a lack of tourist accommodation in Southport. The site hosted weekly markets throughout the 1990s for several years after its closure, until its eventual demolition in 2003, at which time a time capsule was buried where the popular mall once stood. The area is now home to the Meriton Brighton on Broadwater development, a mix of high and low rise buildings together with trendy eateries and some retail outlets. In more recent years another a time capsule was discovered on the Sundale site which was buried when the mall was originally constructed. It was originally meant to be opened in the 2000s and was filled with notes and items which were meant to predict what the 21st century would be like. It is now located in the Gold Coast City Council Local Studies Library. In 1983 Scarborough Fair, now known as Australia Fair, was opened on Scarborough Street.

== Sport ==
Sports facilities located inside the Gold Coast CBD boundaries include the Gold Coast Aquatic Centre, the Gold Coast Sport Fishing Club, James Overall Park, the Queens Park Tennis Centre, the Southport Bowls Club and the Southport Croquet Club. The Aquatic Centre and Fishing Club are both located inside the Southport Broadwater Parklands precinct overlooking the Broadwater. James Overall Park is located at the southern tip of the CBD boundary along Brighton Parade and houses the Eagles Rugby Union Club. The Tennis Centre and Croquet Club are located at the eastern end of Queen Street and are by far the oldest sports clubs in the CBD. The Queens Park Tennis Centre, established in 1911 as the Logan and Albert Tennis Association and based in Beenleigh, moved to its current headquarters on Queen Street in 1928 and is one of the longest running sporting associations on the Gold Coast. Queens Park hosts the prestigious Rose Bowl Championships each year and held exhibition matches with the Australian Davis Cup team in the late 1950s. Winners of the Rose Bowl include tennis legends such as Rod Laver and Pat Cash. In recent years, the club has produced professional top 10 tennis players such as Samantha Stosur and Bernard Tomic.

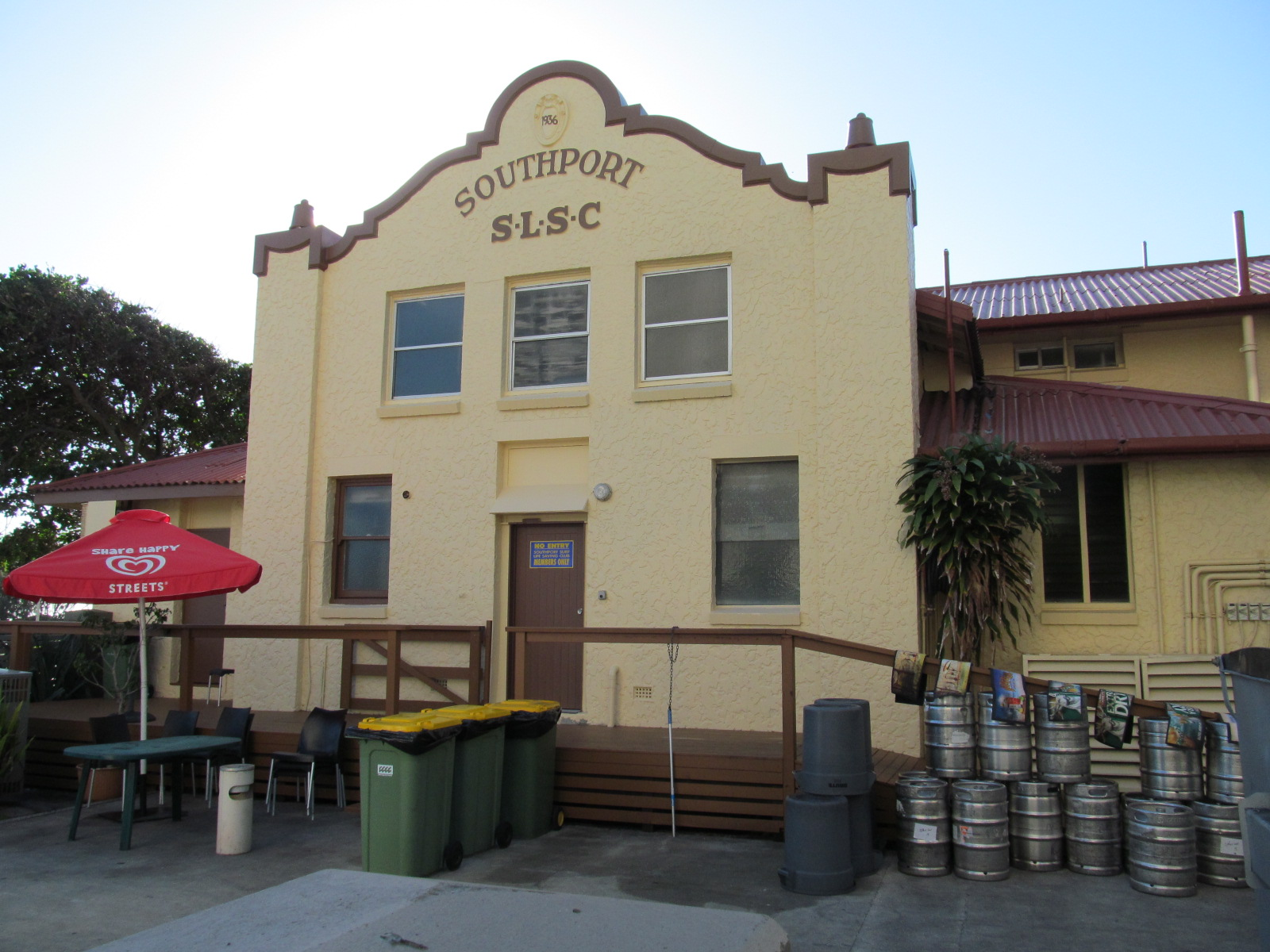
Southport Surf Lifesaving Club in 2013.

Sports facilities located just outside the CBD boundaries include Owen Park, the Southport Surf Life Saving Club and the Southport Yacht Club. Owen Park is located just beyond the western tip of the CBD boundary on Queen Street. In 1883, the Southport Cricket Club, then known as the Wharehouse Cricket Association, was established and set up base at Owen Park. The Southport Harness and Greyhound Racing Club later set up base at Owen Park and shared tenancy with the Cricket Club. In 1962, the Southport Sharks Australian rules football team, then known as the Southport Magpies, established itself and played out of Owen Park during the cricket off season over the winter months. In 1972, Owen Park was extended when the Southport landfill was built on by the Southport Tigers and a rugby league field was added to the park. In March 1982, the Gold Coast Australian Football League pulled off a major coup by arranging a VFL exhibition match between Footscray and Geelong at Owen Park. In 1987, the Sharks and Cricket Club submitted plans to relocate to west Southport and build an oval more suited to their needs. The Gold Coast Parklands racing facilities were built in 1988 and by 1989 Owen Park was left one sports tenant, the Southport Tigers. In 1999, the Gold Coast Sporting Hall of Fame opened at Owen Park.

The Southport Surf Life Saving Club and Southport Yacht Club are located over the Broadwater in the bordering suburb of Main Beach. Woodroffe Park, located in the centre of the CBD on Lawson Street, offers public basketball courts and grass areas. It is located next to the Southport Community Centre and is often presumed to be one and the same thing. The Southport Sharks, who were once based just outside the CBD boundaries at Owen Park but now reside 3 kilometres west of the Broadwater Parklands northern tip, have a long history of producing AFL players, the most notable being St Kilda legend Nick Riewoldt, the first and only Queenslander to be taken with the number 1 pick in the AFL draft.

Several schools inside and just outside the CBD boundaries run very successful sports excellence programs. The Southport School has a long history of producing Australian rugby schoolboy representatives and is a strong competitor in Queensland's premier GPS rugby competition. Keebra Park State High School runs an extremely successful rugby league program and has won several national schoolboy rugby league titles in recent years. Both schools have had many students move into the professional leagues of either respective sport following graduation.

== Transport ==
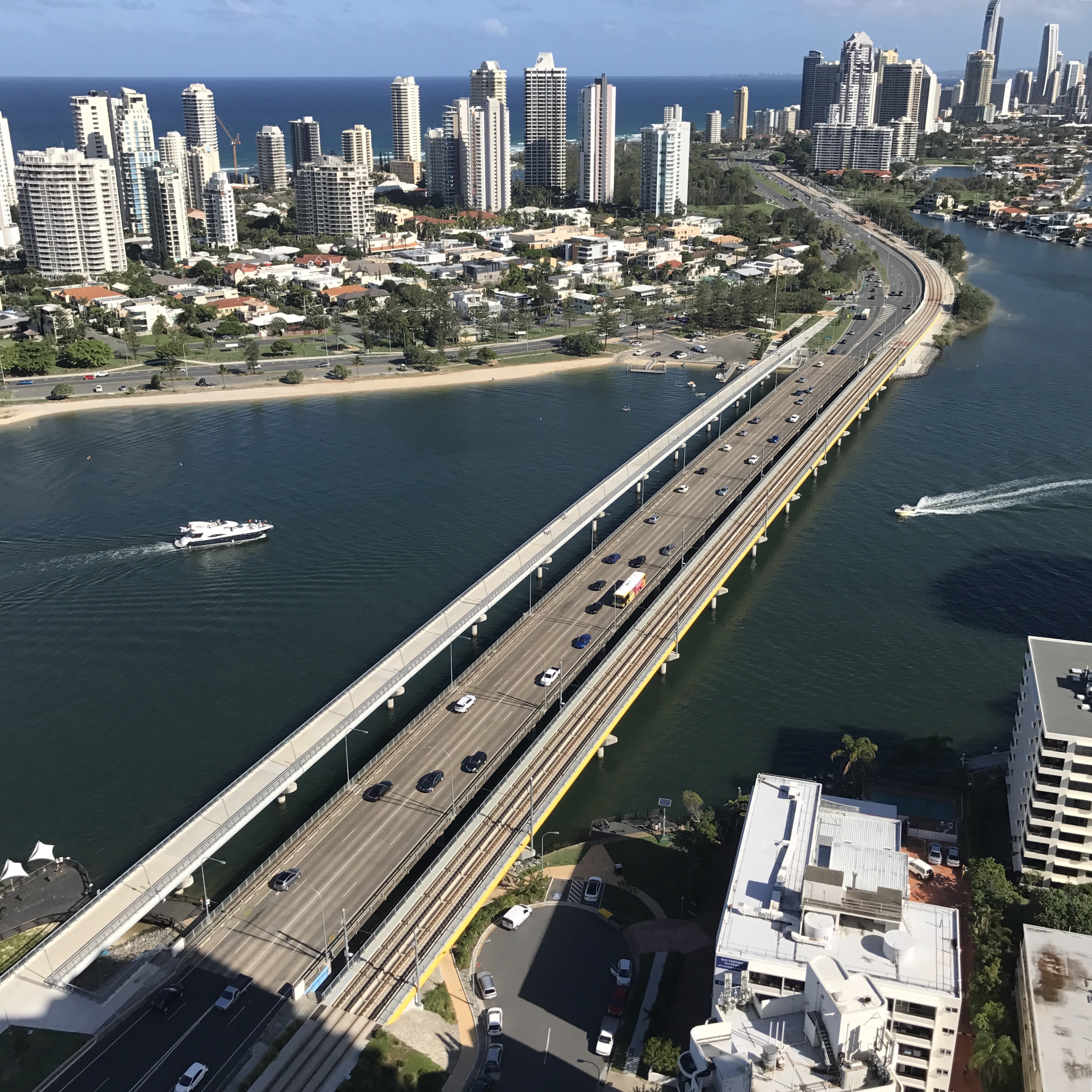
The Sundale Bridge connects the Gold Coast CBD to popular tourist destinations Surfers Paradise and Main Beach.

In 1887, German immigrant Johan Meyer provided a private ferry service, known as Meyer's Ferry, to residents that connected Southport to modern day Main Beach and Surfers Paradise. The South Coast railway line was opened in 1889, which was a 42 kilometres (26 mi) extension of the Beenleigh railway line to the township of Southport. The Southport Railway Station was located on the northern end of the CBD along Scarborough Street. In 1964, the South Coast railway line was closed due to the increasing popularity of the motor car and financial losses. The last existing remnant of the site is an east–west road that was laid next to the station, known as Railway Street.

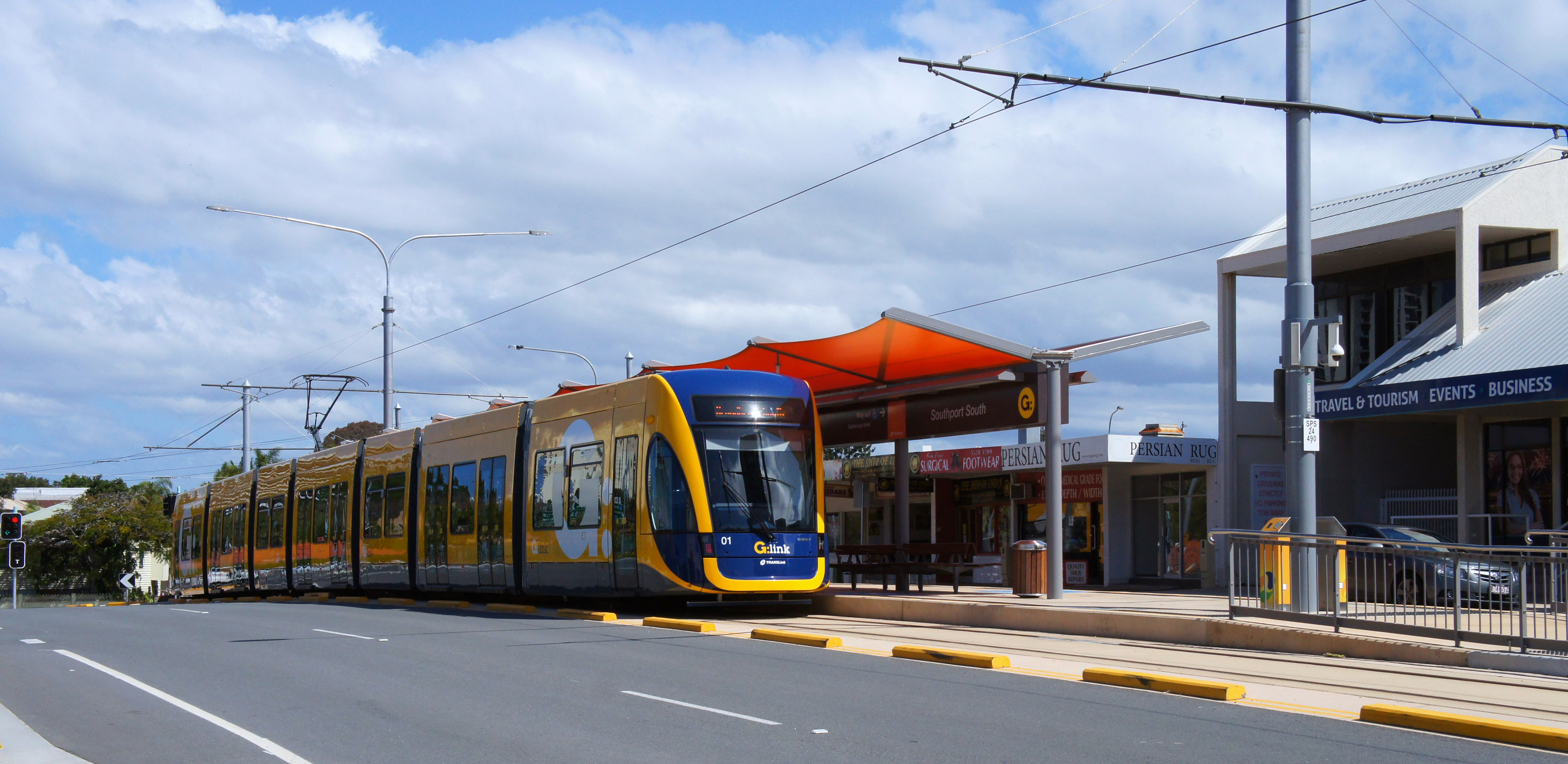
The Southport South G:link station.

Rail transport returned to the CBD in 2014 when the first stage of the Gold Coast light rail line opened. The line included four stations inside the CBD boundaries.

Three major roads on the Gold Coast lead into the CBD which come from the south-east/north-east, south-central and the west. The Gold Coast Highway enters the CBD from Main Beach in south-east and the Sundale Bridge signifies the southern entrance into the city. The Gold Coast Highway also enters the CBD from Labrador in the north-east and Loders Creek Bridge signifies the northern entrance into the city. Ferry Road enters the CBD from the south-central and officially enters the area as the road intersects with Queen Street. The Smith Street Motorway enters the CBD from the west and officially enters the area as the road intersects High Street and becomes North Street.
