= Metropolitan South Institute of TAFE =

- Type: TAFE Institute
- Students: 30,000
- Location: Brisbane, Queensland, Australia
- Campus: Mount Gravatt, Alexandra Hills, Loganlea, Browns Plains, Beaudesert
- Website: http://www.msit.tafe.qld.gov.au

Metropolitan South Institute of TAFE (also known as MSIT or Metro South TAFE) was a progressive, public provider of technical and further education college within Queensland, Australia. MSIT operated in the highly competitive vocational education and training sector. The college offered 270 courses for approx 30,000 students enrolled each year. MSIT also provided fee for service corporate training and small business coaching programs.

In 2012, MSIT became the first TAFE college to deliver higher education bachelor's degree programs in Queensland, initially in disciplines such as accounting, early childhood teaching, film and television, or fashion design. MSIT established a strong list of links with Australian and international universities, enabling graduating students to earn credit towards additional qualifications with a university.

MSIT also developed and ran a unique alternative to high school (Year 12) senior studies programs from its Alexandra Hills campus. For almost two years MSIT was Queensland's only tri-sector education provider, delivering qualifications and training for secondary, vocational and higher education.

On 19 May 2014 MSIT ceased operations as its own entity (due to policy and structural changes announced by the Queensland state government), leading to an amalgamation with Brisbane North Institute of TAFE and Southbank Institute of Technology, to become TAFE Queensland Brisbane under the new statutory body called TAFE Queensland. Prior to amalgamation, the Alexandra Hills campus was known as the Moreton Institute of TAFE.

Metropolitan South Institute of TAFE had campuses located in the southeast of the wider Brisbane region including:

- Mount Gravatt
- Alexandra Hills
- Beaudesert
- Browns Plains
- Loganlea

== See also ==
- TAFE Queensland
- TAFE Brisbane
- Brisbane North Institute of TAFE
- Southbank Institute of Technology
