= Gold Coast Arena =

Multipurpose arena in Gold Coast, Queensland

- Interactive map of Gold Coast Arena
- Location: Southport, Queensland, Australia
- Coordinates: 27.9712°S 153.4182°E
- Capacity: 12,000
- Public transit: G:link - Southport South; G:link - Broadwater Parklands

Construction
- Opened: 2030 (expected)
- Cost: A$480 million (US$335 million)
- Architects: 3XN, Cox Architecture
- Project managers: AmplifyGC (Live Nation Entertainment, Plenary Group)
- General contractor: Built Australia

Gold Coast Arena is a planned multi-purpose sports and entertainment arena located on the Gold Coast, Queensland, Australia.

== History ==
In April 2015 it emerged that stadium hiring costs at Robina Stadium were not viable long-term for the Gold Coast Titans and local media outlets began pressuring Stadiums Queensland to alter the existing contract. The Titans had investigated the possibility of moving games to the Gold Coast Suns' home ground but were quickly made aware that Carrara Stadium was also owned by Stadiums Queensland and would incur a similar hiring fee. It was also revealed that Cricket Australia's plan to host Big Bash League games on the Gold Coast was contingent on a new stadium deal being struck between the Suns and Stadiums Queensland. After a two-year standoff and without a suitable alternative to leverage Stadiums Queensland into cutting a more equitable deal, Gold Coast Mayor Tom Tate expressed disappointment in Stadiums Queensland's unwillingness to amend stadium hiring costs for both the Suns and Titans while also putting forward the concept of a council-owned boutique venue. Despite successful renegotiations between the Suns, Titans and Stadiums Queensland in mid-2018, a boutique entertainment venue remained on the agenda for Gold Coast city leaders.

In October 2018, it was revealed that the Gold Coast Council had earmarked the historic CBD site of Owen Park as the front-runner to be converted into an entertainment venue. In early 2019, the city of Brisbane emerged as a contender to host the 2032 Summer Olympics and that new and existing venues on the Gold Coast were required for the bid to be successful. City Mayor Tom Tate announced the establishment of the Gold Coast Music Advisory Group in September 2019 and committed to a 50/50 funding split with the Queensland Government for the $60 million entertainment venue. A week later, international promoters TEG and Live Nation expressed willingness to work with local and state governments to make the venue a reality. Local media outlets also suggested AEG Ogden were interested in managing the venue and Chairman Harvey Lister threw his weight behind the concept of a 10,000 seat entertainment venue on the Gold Coast. In December 2019 it was revealed that Queensland Tourism Minister Kate Jones had met with Live Nation several times about their plans to scope out a location for a new music venue on the Gold Coast.

On 8 April 2019, TEG Dainty CEO, Paul Dainty, announced that Queen would perform at Carrara Stadium as a part of their 2020 Rhapsody Tour and revealed that it was the first time that an international touring act would perform in Brisbane and the Gold Coast on the same leg of their respective tour to test whether it was profitable to schedule dates in both cities on the one tour. Both concerts would pull over 40,000 attendees and the two-city touring model was deemed a success, with Dainty stating that his company would look to schedule future touring acts to include dates in both Brisbane and the Gold Coast. In March 2020 Gold Coast Mayor Tom Tate outlined the construction of a Gold Coast indoor arena as a priority for the city in the lead up to the local Gold Coast City Council elections. In April 2020 Tate was returned as Mayor of the Gold Coast and reaffirmed his support for the entertainment venue project.

Tom Tate revealed in October 2020 that he was going to present a project report to other Gold Coast councillors later that month which would detail proposed sites for the 8000-12,000 seat planned venue and that the project was still "very much on the agenda" for the city but had been delayed due to the COVID-19 pandemic.

=== Current plans ===
In 2018, it was revealed that the historic CBD site of Owen Park was considered the front-runner site for the construction of the entertainment venue. A depot in Miami has also been suggested as a potential site for the venue but is considered unlikely due to a lack of reliable public transport access. Current plans for the venue to include a retractable roof comparable to Melbourne Arena were revealed in December 2019, and Gold Coast Mayor Tom Tate believed the project should be completed within a two-year period.

In March 2026, the Gold Coast City Council agreed to move the project forward on a "no-commitment" basis. Prior to this, Invest Gold Coast opened an expression of interest to select private sectors that would design, finance, construct and operate the arena. On 16 March 2026, a consortium joint venture between Live Nation Entertainment and Plenary Group, known as AmplifyGC, was announced to be the proponent for the venue. 3XN and Cox Architecture were also selected as architects for the arena.

== Planned events ==
It has been mooted that the arena will be a convertible facility capable of hosting live musical concerts, large scale stand up comedy, car shows, Esports events as well as smaller scale professional sports. It has been suggested that Gold Coast United may be readmitted into the A-League and base themselves at the more suitably-sized arena with rental costs akin to their respective expenses. The Gold Coast Titans and Gold Coast Rugby have also indicated their interest in hosting smaller scale games at the arena. In addition, the facility opens the door for a National Basketball League return for the city as well as the establishment of a professional netball team in the Suncorp Super Netball League.

== Transport access ==
The prospective CBD site is serviced by two light rail stations, Nerang Street to the east (500 metres away) and Queen Street to the west (800 metres away), which connects to the Queensland Rail City network allowing passengers to travel to the Brisbane CBD. The site is also serviced by bus stations in the same locations, as well as stops in the north on Johnston Street and Nerang Street to the south.

Public transport access
Service	Station/stop	Line/route
G:link	Southport South; Broadwater Parklands	L1
Kinetic Gold Coast	Australia Fair	

== See also ==
- List of sports venues in Australia
