= The Bremer Institute of TAFE =

Australian training provider

The Bremer Institute of TAFE was a training provider in Queensland, Australia. It had six campuses, located at Bundamba, Goodna, Ipswich, Inala, Springfield and Boonah.

The Bremer was one of Australia's Technical and Further Education (TAFE) Institutes. The Bremer won Large Training Provider of the Year in 2004 and 2006 at the Queensland Training Awards and went on to win the prestigious Large Training Provider of the Year at the Australian Training Awards in 2006.

The institute was merged with Southern Queensland Institute in 2013 and became TAFE Queensland South West.

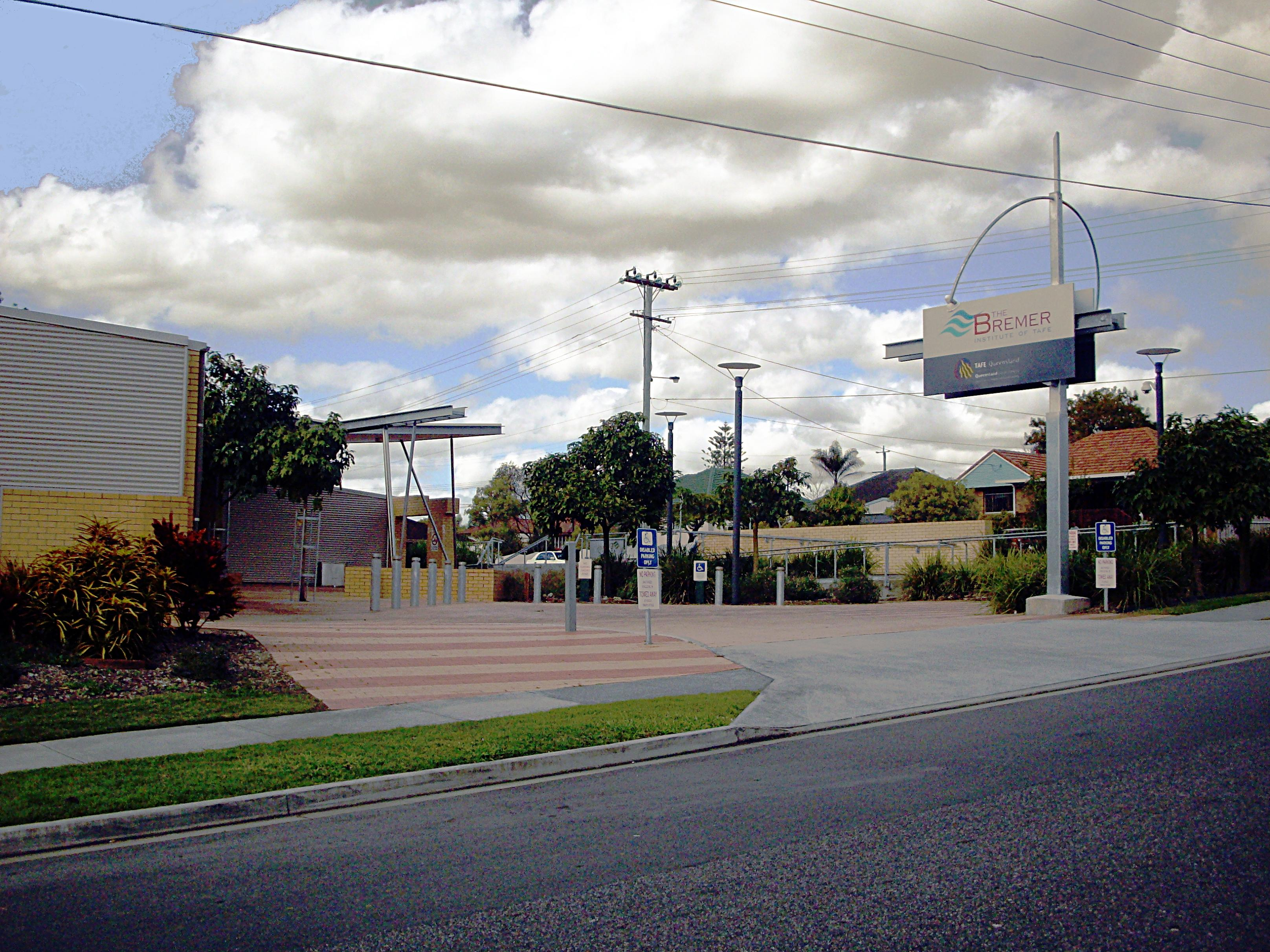
The Bremer Institute of TAFE (Inala campus)

== See also ==
- Technical and Further Education
- Goodna
- TAFE Queensland
