= Ahlatt Lumyang =

Burmese fashion designer

- Born: 1993 (age 32–33)
- Education: Metropolitan South Institute of TAFE
- Occupation: Fashion designer

Ahlatt Lumyang (born 1993) is a Burmese fashion designer of ethnic Kachin descent. He is best known for his designs combining traditional prints with military style tailoring and fabrics.

== Education ==
Lumyang graduated from the Metropolitan South Institute of TAFE, Australia, in 2012.

== Fashion shows ==
Lumyang presented his ALPHA collection at the Mercedes-Benz Stylo Asia Fashion Week in 2015, alongside Malaysian designers and over 60 designers from 18 Asian countries and other international fashion festivals. His collection featured 11 complete looks, all of them inspired by traditional acheik and kanok textiles. His designs combined the traditional prints with military style tailoring and fabrics. He has been displayed more at than 50 fashion shows in locals.

On March 25, 2018, Lumyang participated in the “One1Ness Fashion Show” at the Tawin Center, in Dagon township. The show was organized in order to raise money for the displaced people in the north of Myanmar who have been affected by conflict since the ceasefire between the Myanmar armed force and the Kachin Independence Army broke some years ago. In this collection, he used colorful small balls which can be seen in the traditional costumes of the Li Su tribe. One-piece dresses and ensemble were decorated with these small pom pom balls.
