= TAFE Queensland Brisbane =

- Motto: Make Great Happen
- Type: Technical and further education
- Established: 2013
- Location: Brisbane, Queensland, Australia
- Website: tafebrisbane.edu.au

TAFE Queensland Brisbane was formed in 2013 on 1 July by the amalgamation of Southbank Institute of Technology, the Brisbane North Institute of TAFE and the Metropolitan South Institute of TAFE. TAFE Queensland Brisbane has eight campus locations spread across the Greater Brisbane geographical footprint from the north side (Caboolture) to the far south (Loganlea).

As of July 2017 TAFE Queensland started the process of consolidating TAFE Queensland Brisbane and its five other regional registered training organisations (RTOs) into one single RTO. TAFE Queensland Brisbane now no longer operates as a separate RTO.

TAFE Queensland campuses across the Greater Brisbane area offer a wide range of qualifications, including entry-level skill sets, certificates, diplomas, advanced diplomas and bachelor degrees.

== Campus locations ==
- Alexandra Hills
- Bracken Ridge
- Caboolture
- Grovely
- Loganlea
- Mount Gravatt
- Redcliffe
- South Bank

TAFE Queensland Brisbane and TAFE Queensland SkillsTech co-operate the Alexandra Hills and Bracken Ridge campuses.

== See also ==
- TAFE Queensland
