= Chinatowns in Oceania =

Chinatown
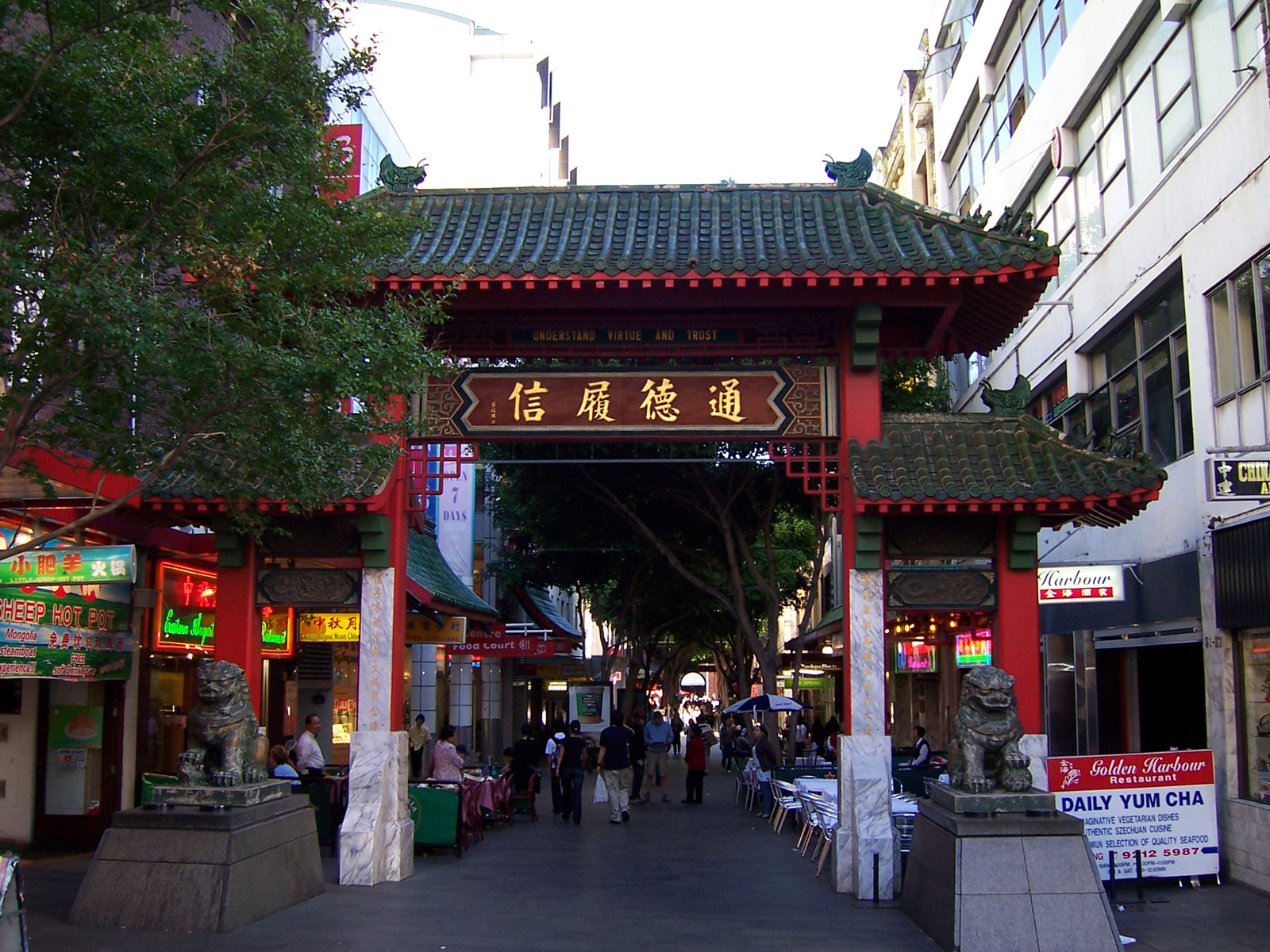
- Sydney Chinatown
- Chinese: 唐人街
- Hakka: Tongˇ nginˇ gieˊ
Transcriptions
Standard Mandarin
- Hanyu Pinyin: Tángrénjiē
Hakka
- Romanization: Tongˇ nginˇ gieˊ

Alternative Chinese name
- Traditional Chinese: 中國城
- Simplified Chinese: 中国城
- Hakka: Zungˊ guedˋ sangˇ
Transcriptions
Standard Mandarin
- Hanyu Pinyin: Zhōngguóchéng
Hakka
- Romanization: Zungˊ guedˋ sangˇ

Second alternative Chinese name
- Traditional Chinese: 華埠
- Simplified Chinese: 华埠
- Hakka: Faˇ pu
Transcriptions
Standard Mandarin
- Hanyu Pinyin: Huábù
Hakka
- Romanization: Faˇ pu

This article discusses Chinatowns in Oceania.

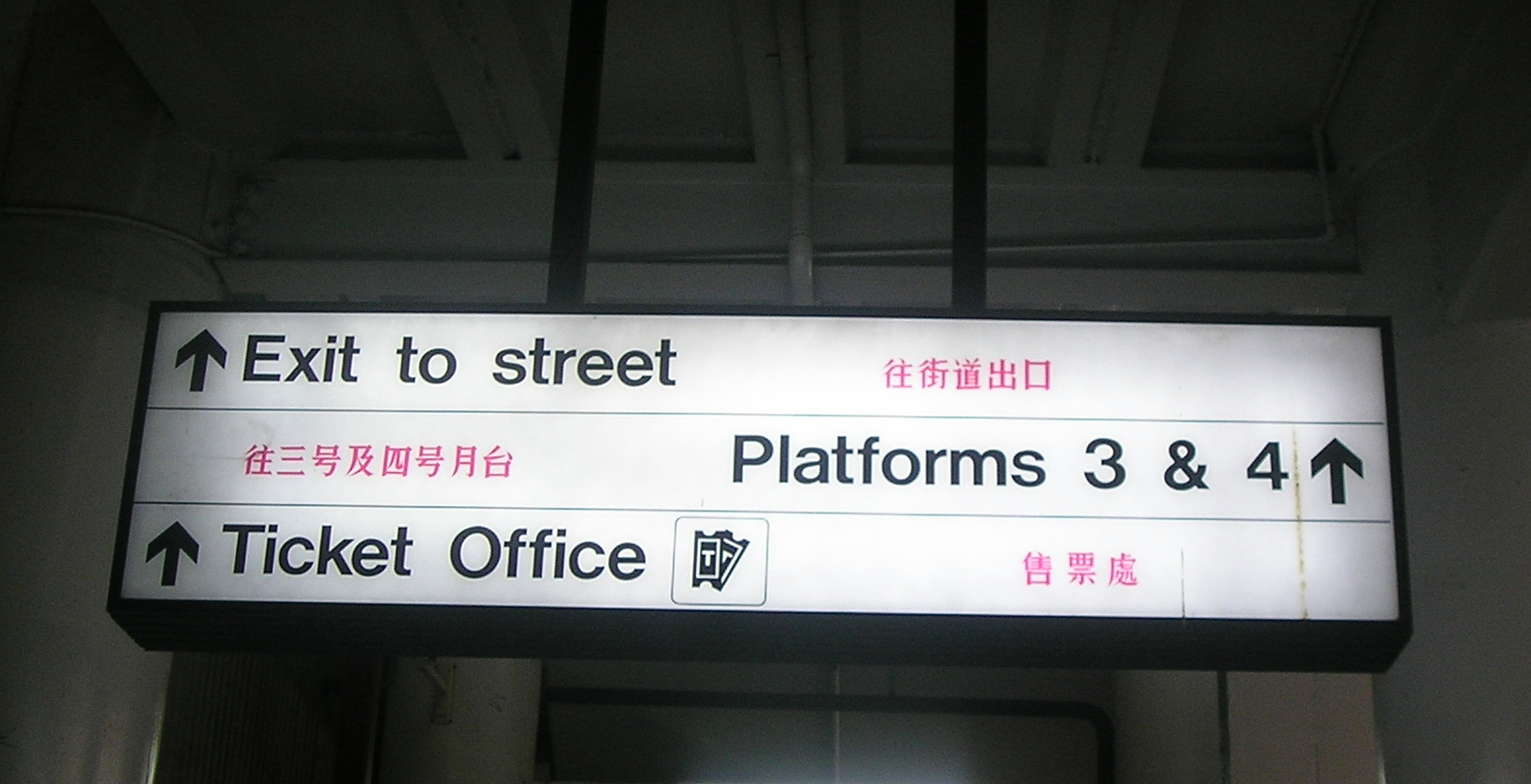
Bilingualism in suburban Fortitude Valley in Brisbane, Australia. Chinatown is located above ground.

== Australia ==
Given its proximity to the Asian continent, Australia has had, and continues to witness, a massive immigration of Chinese and other Asians. As with Canada, the majority of ethnic Chinese immigrants to Australia are from Hong Kong and Canton. Chinese from various places of mainland China, Macau, Taiwan, Korea, Southeast Asia—especially Vietnam, Laos, Cambodia, Philippines, and Indonesia—and Latin America also settled Australia.

Many early Chinese from the Guangdong and Fujian provinces of China immigrated to Australia during the gold rush era. They were mainly Chinese of Taishanese, Cantonese, Hokkien, and Hakka origin. As in North America, the Chinese faced massive institutionalized discrimination, and Asian immigration was restricted by the White Australia Policy in the late 1880s. It was repealed by the 1970s under multiculturalist policies, which in turn ushered in a new wave of Asian immigration, particularly from Hong Kong and the People's Republic of China, and giving rise to several Australian Chinatown communities.

Australia has numerous contemporary city Chinatowns such as Chinatown, Gold Coast, and historic frontier and rural Chinatowns.

== French Polynesia ==
The Chinatown, called Quartier Chinois, in French Polynesia is located in Papeete on Tahiti island. Its overseas Chinese also migrated to France. Starting in 1865, early Chinese migrants of the Hakka variety arrived in French Polynesia to work on the island cotton plantations. Many of these migrants were exploited. The ethnic Chinese population has been declining in French Polynesia.

== Guam ==
Hagåtña (Agaña) has a unique Chinatown in Guam, a United States territory. The first Chinese immigrated during the Spanish territorial period, and their first descendants can speak Spanish. The Japanese, Koreans, Thais, Vietnamese, Filipinos, Chamorros, and other Pacific Islanders also settled the place, making it a multi-Asian district. These Asians also migrated to Hawaii or mainland United States.

== Nauru ==
The only Nauruan Chinatown is located at the Aiue Boulevard in the Aiwo District.

== New Caledonia ==
Noumea has the only Chinatown, or Quartier Chinois, in New Caledonia. It has been settled by ethnic Vietnamese, Chinese Vietnamese, and Chinese Indonesian refugees. These Chinese also settled in France.

== New Zealand ==
Dancers celebrate the start of the Year of the Rooster in Dunedin, New Zealand, February 2005

There is an overall strong Asian presence in many of the country's urban areas. Many Taiwanese and Cantonese settlers from Hong Kong also live permanently in New Zealand, and in recent years New Zealand universities have been attractive to overseas students from Asia. Chinatowns existed on Greys Avenue in Auckland and Haining Street in Wellington up until the 1970s, and there is a growing community in both Christchurch and Dunedin.

The first early Chinese immigrants to New Zealand were Cantonese from Guangdong Province, who immigrated as a result of the Otago gold rush of 1861. The former Chinese gold-mining settlement near the present town of Lawrence is being restored as an open-air museum, as has a similar former settlement at Arrowtown. Because of this influx of Cantonese during the 1860s, there is a strong Chinese presence in Dunedin, which has the country's only traditional Chinese Garden. Recent mayor from 2004 to 2010, Peter Chin is of Chinese descent. During the late 19th century and early 20th century, the area between Rattray Street and Stafford Street at the southern end of the city's CBD had the highest concentration of Chinese businesses in the country, notably Choie (Charles) Sew Hoy's importing company.

In the 1880s, openly sinophobic political ideology, especially in the heavily Chinese city of Dunedin, resulted in the New Zealand head tax, also known as the 'Poll Tax', aimed specifically at Chinese migrants. Racist violence towards Chinese people in New Zealand followed, such as the tragic murder of Joe Kum Yung by white supremacist Lionel Terry. This attack occurred in Haining Street in Te Aro, Wellington, on 24 September 1905, in the centre of what was once was a significant Chinatown.

Though Dunedin has no specific Chinatown area per se, a large proportion of the businesses in northern George Street cater specifically for the large East and Southeast Asian community centred on this part of the city.

Other groups of Chinese travelled from South Korea, South Africa, Australia, Latin America, and the other Pacific Islands. Korean, Thai, Vietnamese, and Filipino culture are also prevalent in New Zealand's Chinatowns, making them multi-Asian places.

In 2002, the New Zealand Government made a public apology to the Chinese for the poll tax that had been levied on their forebears a century ago. The apology was re-issued in Cantonese in 2023.

== Northern Mariana Islands ==
Saipan in the Northern Mariana Islands has a residential district known as "China Town" located outside Garapan. However, very few Chinese actually live there and most of the small groceries in the area are actually run by Koreans.

== Papua New Guinea ==
Several old Chinatowns dot the landscape of Papua New Guinea. The Chinatown of Rabaul is among the oldest in the nation. There is also a Chinatown in the capital city of Port Moresby. Many ethnic Chinese have migrated to Australia.

== Solomon Islands ==
There is an active Chinatown in the city of Honiara on the Solomon Islands. It was badly damaged in rioting in April 2006, following the election of Snyder Rini as Prime Minister. Chinatown, along with the surrounding areas, was once again left devastated in the aftermath of the 2021 Solomon Islands unrest.

== Vanuatu ==
Vanuatu has a small Chinatown (Quartier Chinois) on Rue Carnot in Port Vila. Its population includes ethnic Vietnamese and ethnic Chinese residents.
