= Southport Broadwater Parklands =

Community park in Gold Coast, Queensland

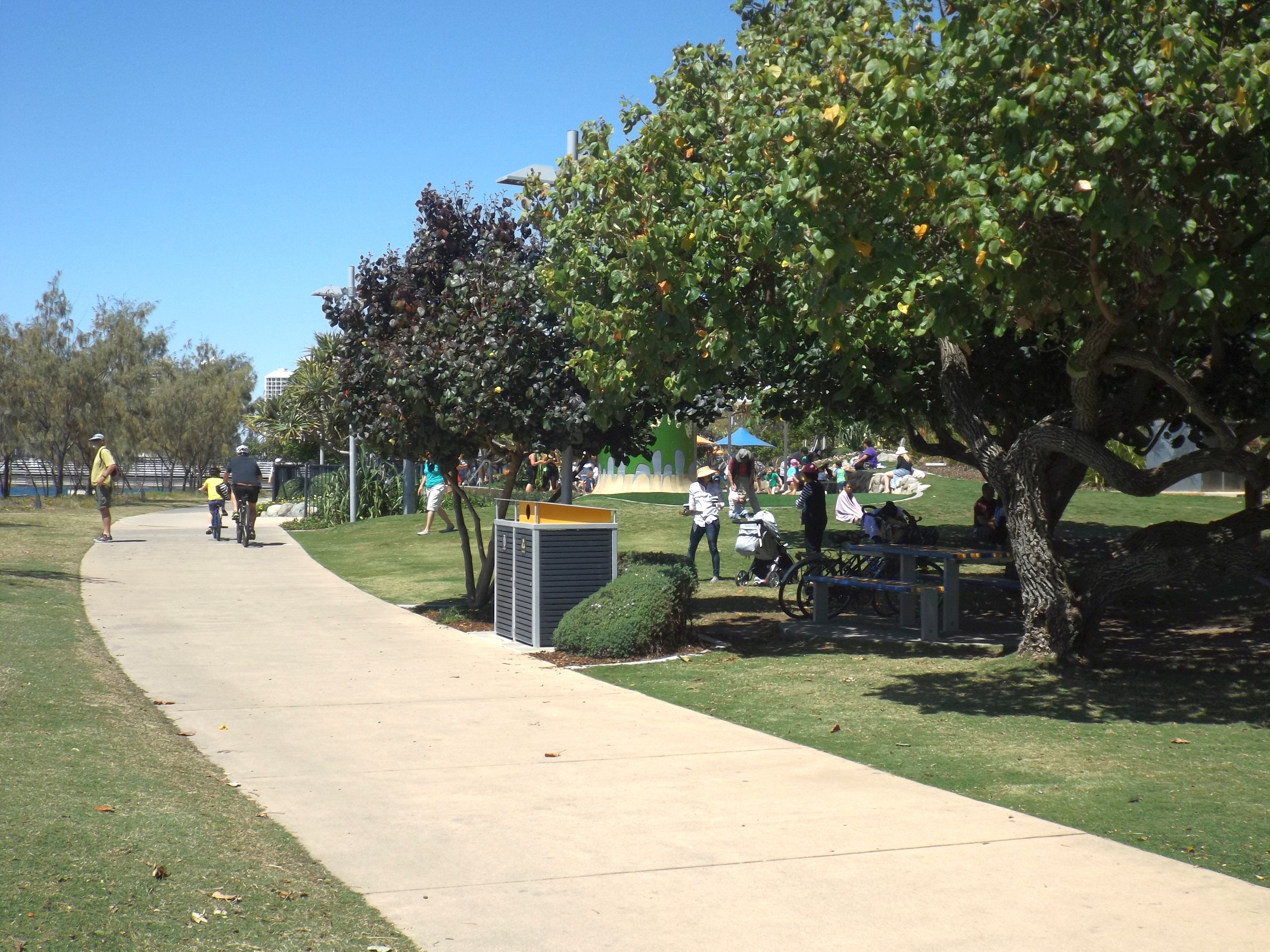
- Pathway, 2015
- Interactive map of Southport Broadwater Parklands
- Address: Marine Parade
- Location: Southport, Gold Coast, Queensland
- Coordinates: 27°58′1.39″S 153°25′3.24″E
- Type: Public parklands

Construction
- Opened: November 1928
- Renovated: 23 August 2009

Website
- Official website

The Southport Broadwater Parklands is a large community park located in Southport. It is designed for large community gatherings and families. The park has many different areas for children and barbecue areas for families. The park went through a major redevelopment and was re-opened by the Premier of Queensland, Anna Bligh, on 23 August 2009. Southport Broadwater Parklands has become a popular family attraction.

== Getting here ==
=== Public parking ===
The Southport Broadwater Parklands is situated parallel to the Gold Coast Highway and opposite Australia Fair shopping centre. The park has several onsite car parks for visitors and on-street parking is also available along the Gold Coat Highway. Both on-street parking and onsite parking are managed by the City of Gold Coast and require a fee.

=== Public transport ===
The public park is accessible by several forms of public transport. The most convenient form of transport is the G:link. This is a light rail line operating from Broadbeach South to Gold Coast University Hospital via Surfers Paradise and Southport. There is a G:link station located just a few hundreds meters from the entrance to the parkland. Trams run every eight minutes during peak times. Southport bus station is only a few minutes' walk from the entrance to the park and provides bus connections to neighboring suburbs.

== History ==
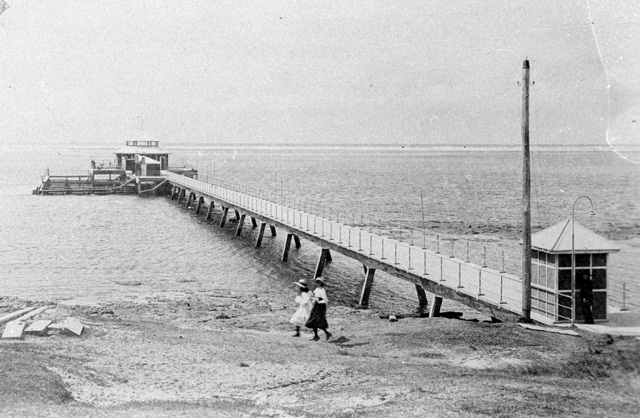
The Southport Pier in 1915

The Southport Broadwater Parklands was first declared a public space in November 1928. At the time the area featured a pier and a series of enclosed public baths. Over several years the original pier deteriorated and was eventually removed. In the 1960s the Southport Pool was constructed.

In 2005 and 2006, the Queensland Government and the Gold Coast City Council began background consultation for the redevelopment of the parklands. By late 2006 a draft master plan was developed. Throughout July and August 2007 community consultation was held on the plan. From August to November 2007 design development took place by EDAW. After some discussions with key stakeholders in October 2007, the final master plan was released in December. The contractor, Abigroup, was appointed shortly after. Construction of stage 1 began in March 2008. After close to one and a half years' construction, the Southport Broadwater Parklands opened on 23 August 2009. Construction of stage 2 began shortly after the opening of stage 1 and was completed by the end of 2010.

== Redevelopment ==
Part of Southport Broadwater Parklands' redevelopment master plan

The Queensland Government and Gold Coast City Council invested over $42 million on stage 1 of the redevelopment of the Southport Broadwater Parklands. The main objectives of the design were to:

- Re-connect the Gold Coast central business district with the Gold Coast Broadwater
- Celebrate 150 years of Queensland as a separate entity from New South Wales
- Generate a sense of community, regional identity and celebrate the history of Southport
- Provide an events space to attract large events such as the Yugambeh Corroboree Food, Art and Language Festival, Gold Coast Marathon, the Pan Pacific Games, the World Championship Triathlon, and the 2018 Commonwealth Games

As of November 2011 only two stages have been constructed and opened; however, additional development was proposed in the master plan.

=== Stage 1 ===
Construction of stage 1 began in March 2008. After close to one and a half years' construction, the Southport Broadwater Parklands opened on 23 August 2009. It included:

- The great pier extends 100m out into the Broadwater and provides views of Surfers Paradise, The Spit and Southport.
- The events lawn hosts some of the city’s largest events including the Gold Coast Airport Marathon and Carols by Candlelight.
- There are also places to have a picnic, to kick a ball, toss a frisbee, or simply relax and enjoy the views of the open Broadwater.
- A public stage with a large outdoor screen provides a spot to watch movies.
- The Pavilion building, with a rooftop deck offering elevated views, has park information, public toilets and showers. There will be bike lockers to encourage commuters to use ‘pedal power’ to travel to and from Southport.
- A new pedestrian crossing links Nerang Street and the Southport CBD to the parklands in place of the existing underpass.
- Walkways and bridges encourage exploration of the ‘urban wetland’, and of cascading water and reed-filled ponds that collects, cleans and filters stormwater before it goes into the Broadwater.
- A boulevard of fig trees provides a shaded space, ideal for farmers’ markets, picnics and summer promenades.
- Coastal casuarinas provide shady spots along the shoreline, for family gatherings.
- Unique artwork was unveiled at the launch of Stage One of the parklands.
- There is a landscaped car park for approximately 200 vehicles.

=== Stage 2 ===
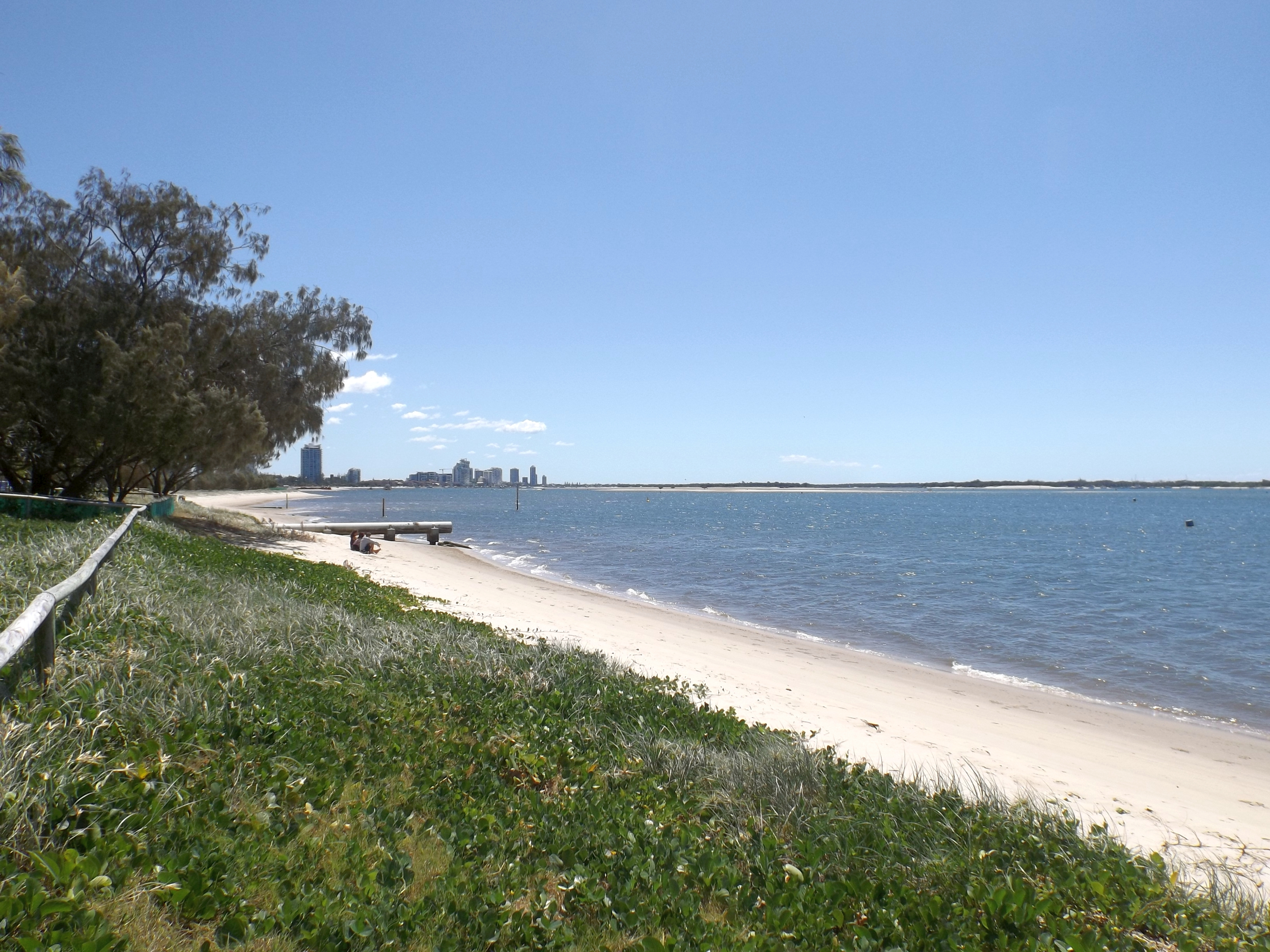
Gold Coast Broadwater foreshore, 2015

Construction of stage 2 began shortly after the opening of stage 1 and was completed by the end of 2010. It included:

- Rockpools - a coastal themed environment featuring a variety of water activities
- The Hill - a 4,150 square metres (44,700 sq ft) lawn with a 2.5-metre (8 ft 2 in) high fibreglass sculpture of a child and her teddy bear
- ANZAC Park - the relocation of the war memorial to a new location overlooking the Broadwater
- Viewing platform
- Operations hub - for maintenance staff
- Picnic space - landscaped area featuring barbecues

=== Future development ===
The final master plan detailed a number of other developments that have yet to take place. These include:

- The relocation of the Gold Coast Highway to run alongside Australia Fair
- The development of an 'Old Shoreline' Water Garden next to the relocated highway
- An extended swimming enclosure

== See also ==
- Sports on the Gold Coast, Queensland
