= TAFE Queensland SkillsTech =

- Motto: Make Great Happen
- Type: Technical and further education
- Established: 2013
- Location: South-east Queensland, Queensland, Australia
- Website: tafeskillstech.edu.au

TAFE Queensland SkillsTech (previously known as SkillsTech Australia and Trade and Technician Skills Institute) is a pre-eminent provider of vocational education and training in Queensland, Australia. It operates four trade training centres across Brisbane and southeast Queensland. TAFE Queensland SkillsTech offers specialist trade training for many industrial areas.

== History ==
In July 2017, the process of consolidating TAFE Queensland SkillsTech and five other regional registered training organisations (RTOs) into a single RTO began. TAFE Queensland SkillsTech consolidated into the TAFE Queensland organisation, and no longer operate as a separate RTO. TAFE Queensland offers admissions to international students in up to 22 study areas. TAFE's international students are mostly from South Korea, China, India, Brazil, Japan, Philippines, Colombia, Nepal, Hong Kong, Italy, Germany, United Kingdom, Taiwan, Sweden, Papua New Guinea, Vietnam, Thailand, South Africa, Indonesia, Malaysia.

== Training centres ==
- Acacia Ridge
- Alexandra Hills
- Bracken Ridge
- Eagle Farm

TAFE Queensland SkillsTech and TAFE Queensland Brisbane co-operate the Alexandra Hills and Bracken Ridge locations.

== See also ==
- TAFE Queensland
- Technical and Further Education
- Education in the United Kingdom
