= TAFE Queensland East Coast =

Technical And Further (vocational) Education

- Motto: Make Great Happen
- Type: Technical and further education
- Established: 2013
- Location: Sunshine Coast and Wide Bay–Burnett, Queensland, Australia
- Website: tafeeastcoast.edu.au

TAFE Queensland East Coast covers the Sunshine Coast and part of the Wide Bay Burnett region in Queensland, Australia. It was formed in 2013 by the amalgamation of the Sunshine Coast Institute of TAFE and the Wide Bay Institute of TAFE and has eight campus locations.

As of 2017 TAFE Queensland commenced consolidating its six regional registered training organisations (RTOs) into a single RTO. TAFE Queensland East Coast no longer exists as a separate RTO. TAFE Queensland operates the East Coast campuses which span the regions of Sunshine Coast, Wide Bay Burnett and Greater Brisbane.

== Campus locations ==
- Bundaberg
- Gympie
- Hervey Bay
- Maroochydore
- Maryborough
- Mooloolaba
- Nambour
- Sunshine Coast Health Institute
- Tewantin (2006-2014)

== See also ==
- TAFE Queensland
- Technical and Further Education (TAFE)
