= TAFE Queensland South West =

- Motto: Make Great Happen
- Type: Technical and further education
- Established: 2013
- Location: Western suburbs of Brisbane and south-west Queensland, Queensland, Australia
- Website: tafesouthwest.edu.au

TAFE Queensland South West was formed by a merger of the Southern Queensland Institute and The Bremer Institute of TAFE on 1 July 2013. It has 11 campus locations spread around the outer western suburbs of Brisbane, further out into regional south-west Queensland and partly into Wide Bay Burnett, covering an area approximately equal to the size of France.

The process of consolidating TAFE Queensland South West and TAFE Queensland's five other regional registered training organisations (RTOs) began in 2017. TAFE Queensland South West now no longer exists as a separate RTO.

== Campus locations ==
- Ipswich
- Toowoomba
- Charleville
- Chinchilla
- Dalby
- Inala
- Kingaroy
- Nurunderi
- Roma
- Springfield
- Warwick
