= Chinatown, Gold Coast =

Coordinates: 27.9691°S 153.4135°E

Chinatown 唐人街 (Chinese)
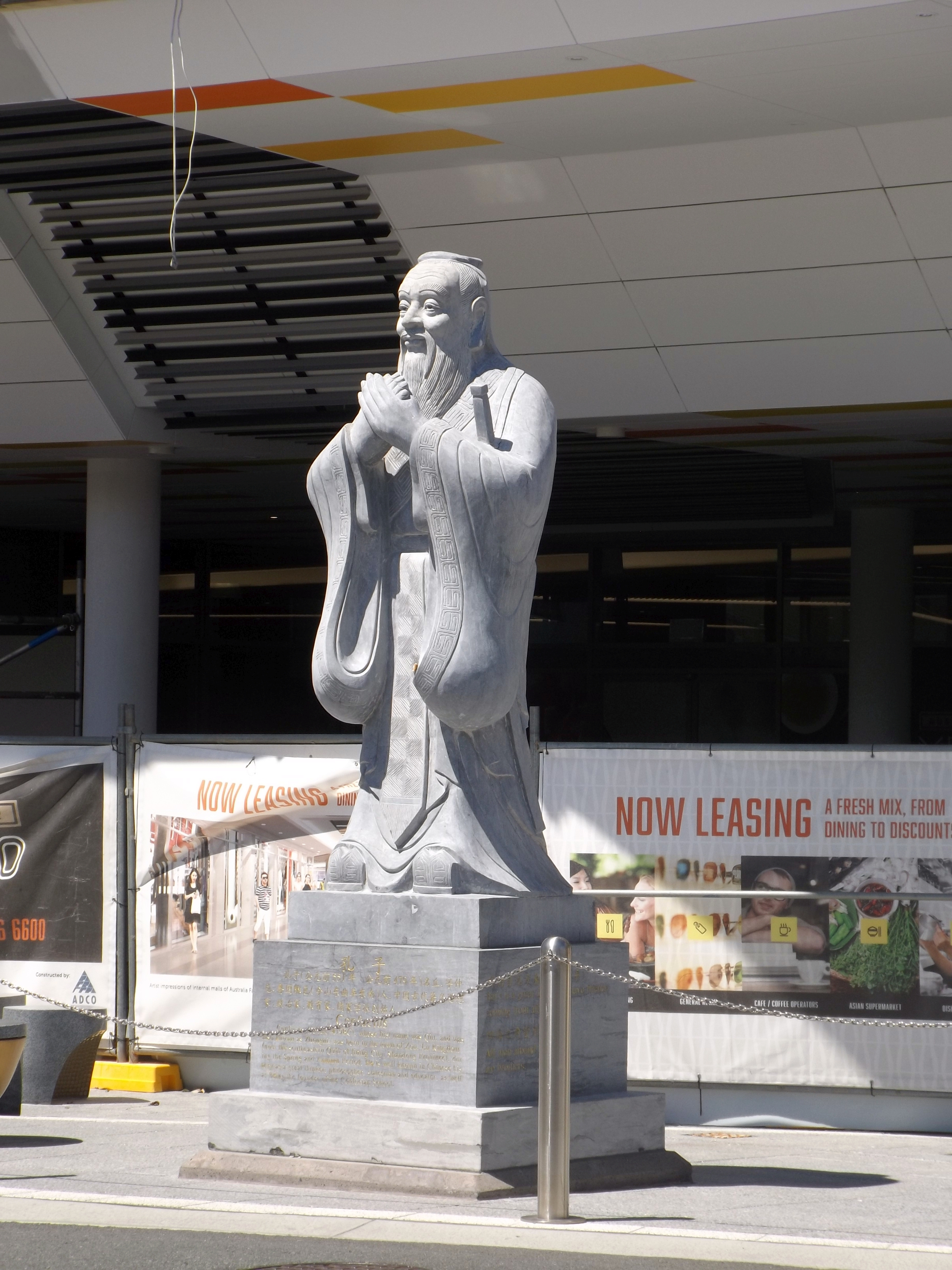
- Confucius statue on Young Street, 2015
- Interactive map of Chinatown
- Country: Australia
- State: Queensland
- City: Southport
- LGA: City of Gold Coast
- Established: 2014

Government
  - State electorate: Southport
  - Federal division: Moncrieff

Gold Coast Chinatown
- Chinese: 黄金海岸中国城
Transcriptions
Standard Mandarin
- Hanyu Pinyin: Huángjīn hǎi'àn Zhōngguó chéng

Gold Coast Chinatown (Chinese: 黄金海中国城) is a precinct in the Gold Coast's suburb of Southport, Queensland, Australia. It is centred on Davenport and Young Streets but also includes the connecting laneways Regent and Davison Lanes and parts of Nerang, Garden and Scarborough Streets. The precinct is the location of Chinese restaurants and shops, and is the venue for events including Chinese New Year. It is also home to many restaurants offering Chinese, Korean, Indonesian, Japanese, Thai and Vietnamese cuisines.

Chinatown plays a key role in the development of Southport, recognised as the city's central business district, however the popularity of the precinct is much smaller compared to its larger counterparts in Brisbane or Sydney.

== History ==
The concept for a Chinatown on the Gold Coast was first conceived in the early 1990s by the local Chinese community and was brought to fruition through the efforts of the State Government, City of Gold Coast. In 2012 local property owners on Young Street voted to establish Chinatown through the Centre Improvement Program process within their precinct. In 2013 property owners on Davenport Street also voted to establish Chinatown, linking in with Young Street.

Gold Coast Chinatown Association was awarded a grant by the State Government in 2013 to work with City of Gold Coast (City) to develop a master plan for Chinatown. The City then developed the Gold Coast Chinatown Precinct Plan in conjunction with the association, local Chinese community, Sister Cities and local businesses and property owners.

Extensive community engagement was carried out with the Chinese community throughout the preparation of the Chinatown Precinct Plan, as well as the design, development and execution of the streetscape and cultural embellishments, and during the delivery of events in the space.

Streetscape improvements were completed by the City in 2014, including widened footpaths, new footpath and street lighting, landscaping reflecting Feng Shui principals, event power and water connections, upgrades to underground services, undergrounding of overhead power lines and flush kerb and channels. The new Chinatown precinct was completed in 2014.

In 2018 Three Paifang gateways were constructed at the entrances to Davenport and Young Streets formally competing the Chinatown precinct.

== Cultural embellishments ==
There are a number of cultural embellishments that have or will be installed into Chinatown. These include:

Paifang

Three Paifang gateways will mark the entries to the heart of Chinatown.

Beihai City provided an artistic conceptual design for the Harmony Paifang. The concept is in the Han Dynasty style, which has over 2,000 years of history in their region of China. The Harmony Paifang forms two towers that mark the eastern entrance to Chinatown, on the corner of Young and Scarborough Streets. The City celebrated this traditional Chinese gateway at an official unveiling with representatives of Beihai City and the Chinese Consul-General in early 2016. This is the first of the three Paifang to be installed in Chinatown, with designs of the next two gates currently underway.

Lanterns and projection imagery

The Gold Coast, traditional and modern Chinese culture and architecture inspired the unique lanterns and projection imagery.

The lanterns reflect the Feng Shui colours of Gold Coast Chinatown, being: Red – Wealth, Gold – Double Happiness, Blue – Harmony and Green – Harvest. Fireworks inspire the lantern patterns. Red knots at the base of the large red lanterns and the gold lanterns are inspired by Chinese knots traditionally used in festivals. The community will be able to embellish the knots during festivals with tassels.

In conjunction with UAP’s China and Australia offices, the lanterns were designed by artist Belinda Smith, and projection artwork (Chinese streetscape and real street life imagery) were designed by artists Belinda Smith and Alexander Adam, with photography by Jamie Perrow.

Artwork

Chinatown is the home of the City’s statue of the Chinese philosopher Confucius, which was donated to the City by Jining City in Shandong Province, the birthplace of Confucius.

"Pandamonium" is half panda and half koala statue and was donated by Mr Ted Fong, Executive President of the Gold Coast Chinese Club Inc and founding member and Chairman of Gold Coast Chinatown Association. "Pandamonium" was designed by artists David Renn and John Cox as part of the Currumbin Wildlife Hospital Foundation’s "Animals with Attitude Sculpture Trail".

Other artworks will continue to appear as Chinatown evolves; including street art, a community piano and laneway sculptures.

== Transport ==
The precinct is well serviced by public transport with the Southport light rail station being ideally located on the northern entrance on the corner of Nerang and Davenport Street. The station is serviced by the Gold Coast's G:link light rail network and is a major interchange with bus connections.

== See also ==
- Chinatowns in Oceania
- Gold Coast central business district
