= Jubilee Bridge (Southport) =

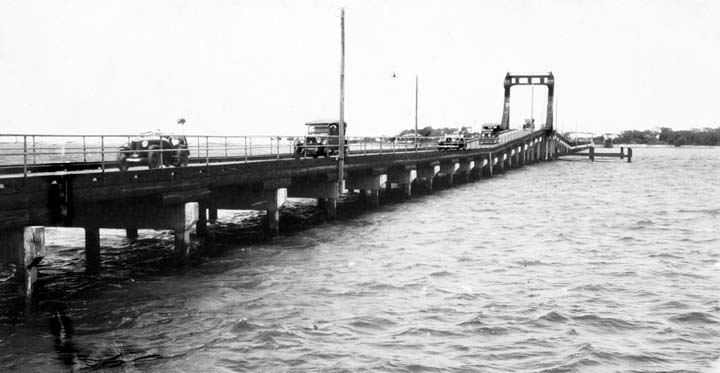
- Jubilee Bridge, Southport, circa 1932
- Coordinates: 27.9745°S 153.4227°E
- Crosses: Nerang River
- Locale: Gold Coast, Queensland
- Owner: Gold Coast City Council
- Followed by: Sundale Bridge

Characteristics
- Material: Deck: ironbark and spotted gum
- Trough construction: Piers: reinforced concrete
- Total length: circa 1,300 feet (400 m)
- Width: 19 feet (5.8 m)

History
- Construction cost: £23,000
- Opened: 8 April 1925
- Inaugurated: 28 November 1925
- Closed: 1966 (and demolished)

Location
- Interactive map of Jubilee Bridge

The Jubilee Bridge (1925–1966) was a bridge across the Nerang River in South East Queensland, Australia. The bridge connected the suburbs of Southport to Main Beach on the Gold Coast, providing the first road connection to Surfers Paradise. It facilitated the development of the Gold Coast beach suburbs and holiday resorts.

== History ==
In 1887, German immigrant Johann Meyer operated a ferry across the Nerang River. From Southport, travellers would follow the Meyer's Ferry Road (now Ferry Road and Bundall Road) to a spit of land that created a narrow point in the river (28.0011°S 153.4247°E). The narrow spit is no longer in existence due to changes in the river and the creation of Chevron Island but was in the vicinity of the Gold Coast Arts Centre. From that point, Meyer's ferry would take the travellers across the river to Meyer's Ferry Road at Elston (or the Main Surf Beach as it was then informally known, now Cavill Avenue, Surfers Paradise). Although a popular destination, the lack of road access limited the extent of residential and commercial development.

In 1925, the Southport Bridge (as it was initially known) was built as a direct extension of Queen Street, Southport (27.9738°S 153.4199°E) in an approximate east-west alignment connecting to what is now Main Beach Parade, Main Beach (27.9747°S 153.4253°E); at that time Main Beach was not developed as it is today.

The bridge was 19 feet (5.8 m) wide and built on reinforced concrete piles, mostly sunk down to a solid rock foundation. The superstructure was built from ironbark and spotted gum. The pedestrian crossing was 4 feet (1.2 m) wide and the road crossing was 13 feet 10 inches (4.22 m), sufficient for two cars to pass. The bridge rose in the middle to allow small boats to pass under it; a central span could be raised and lowered using a hand winch to allow larger vessels to pass, but the process took 25 minutes. The bridge cost approximately £23,000.

The bridge was officially opened for pedestrian traffic on 8 April 1925 by John Appel, Member of the Legislative Assembly for Albert. It could not be opened for vehicular traffic until the road from Main Beach to Burleigh Heads was completed. On 29 August 1925, the Mayor of Southport declared the bridge open for vehicular traffic. On 28 November 1925, the town of Southport was 50 years old. The day was declared a public holiday in Southport, the first of five days of jubilee celebrations. The first event on the day was another official opening of the Southport Bridge, this time by Lieutenant Governor William Lennon who christened the bridge the Jubilee Bridge in honour of Southport's 50th anniversary by smashing a bottle of Australian champagne against one of the bridge's concrete abutments.

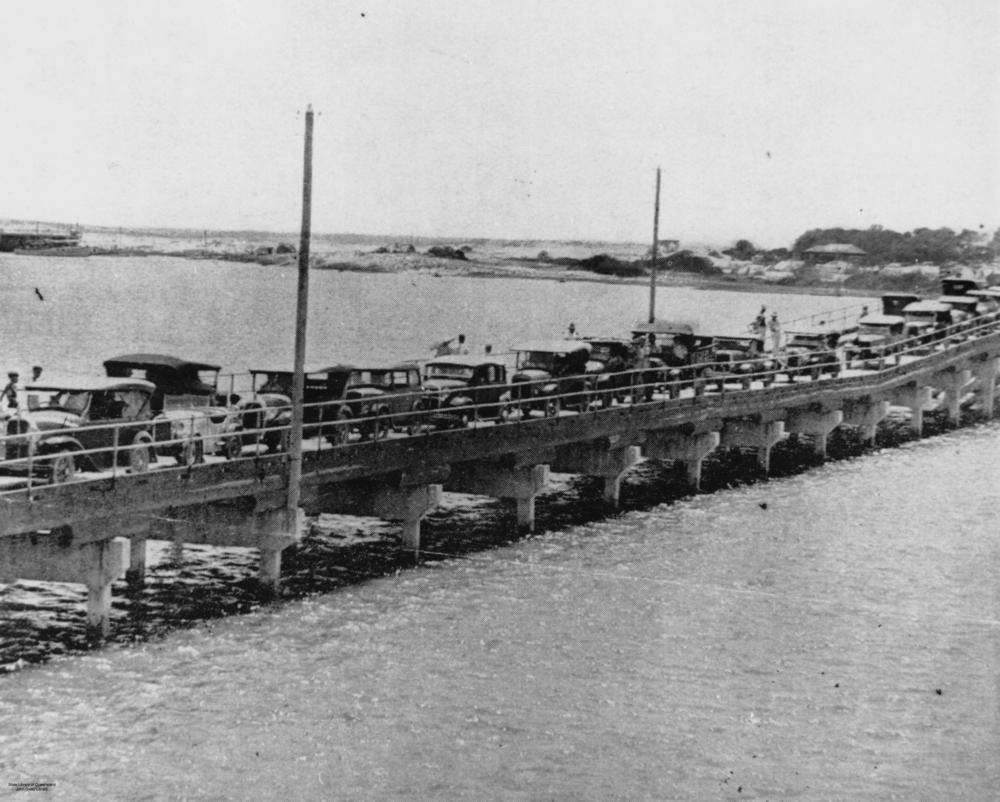
Heavy traffic on the Jubilee Bridge, 1933

In 1933, the lifting span was removed as large vessels no longer used the river.

In 1966, the present Gold Coast Bridge, locally known as the Sundale Bridge due to its proximity to the Sundale Shopping Centre, replaced the Jubilee Bridge, which was demolished. The bridge departs from a similar area of Southport but has a more north-south alignment and so reaches Main Beach further south than the Jubilee Bridge.
