= Sundale Bridge =

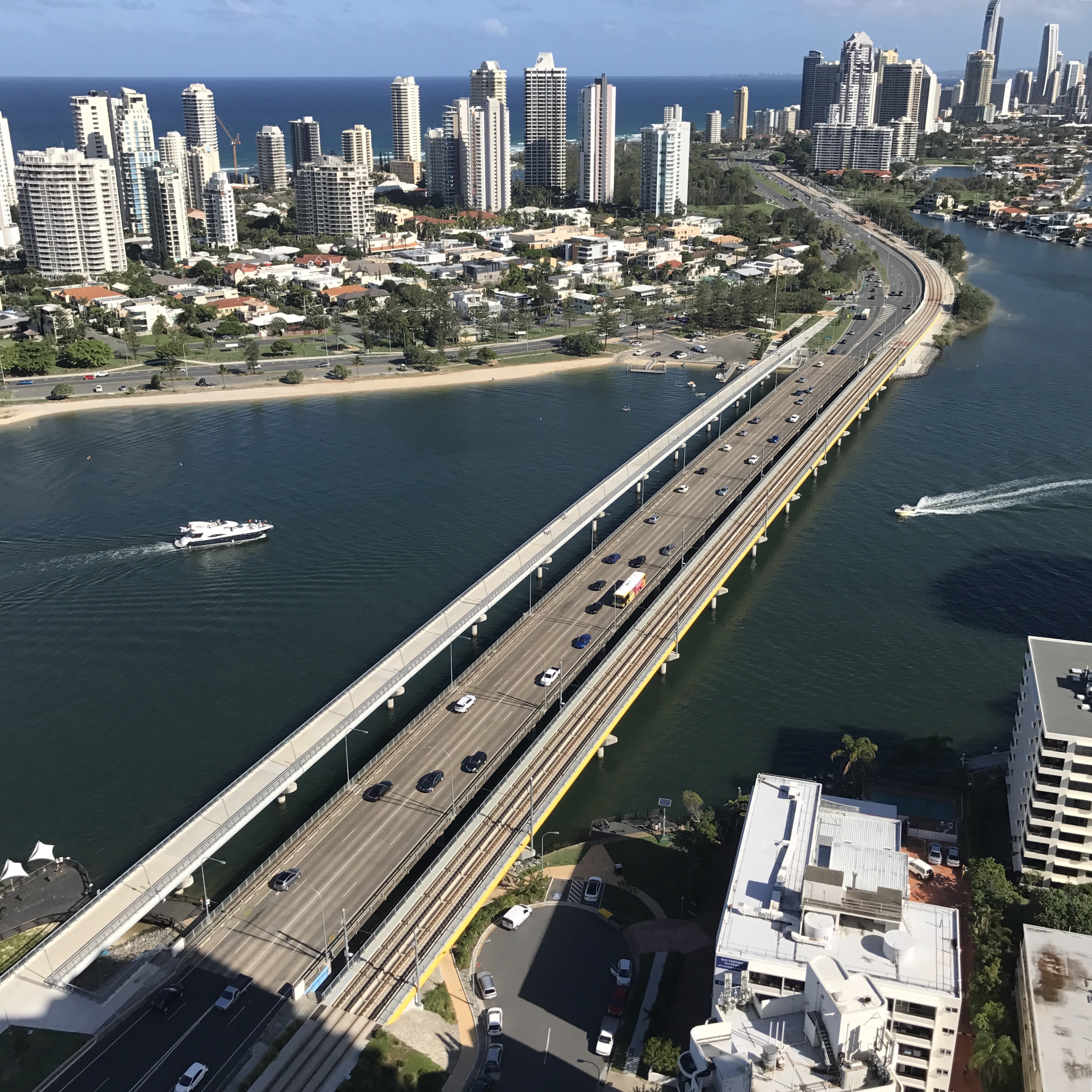
- Sundale Bridge with parallel footbridge and light rail bridge, Southport, 2017
- Coordinates: 27°58′37″S 153°25′16″E
- Carries: Gold Coast Highway; G:link; pedestrians; cyclists
- Crosses: Nerang River
- Locale: Gold Coast, Queensland
- Owner: Gold Coast City Council; GoldLinQ (G:link only)

Characteristics
- Total length: 375 metres (1,230 ft)
- Piers in water: 11 (12 for footbridge)

History
- Opened: 1966; 2014
- Replaces: Jubilee Bridge

Location
- Interactive map of Sundale Bridge

The Sundale Bridge is a bridge located in the Gold Coast region of South East, Queensland, Australia. The bridge was formerly known officially as the Gold Coast Bridge, however it is now referred to as the Sundale Bridge due to its proximity to the site of the former Sundale Shopping Centre, and now Sundale Apartments. The Sundale bridge spans the Nerang River, linking the suburbs of Southport and Main Beach. Opened initially in 1966, the bridge replaced the Jubilee Bridge, and comprises four separate decks and pier structures built at various stages and for a variety of purposes.

== Features ==
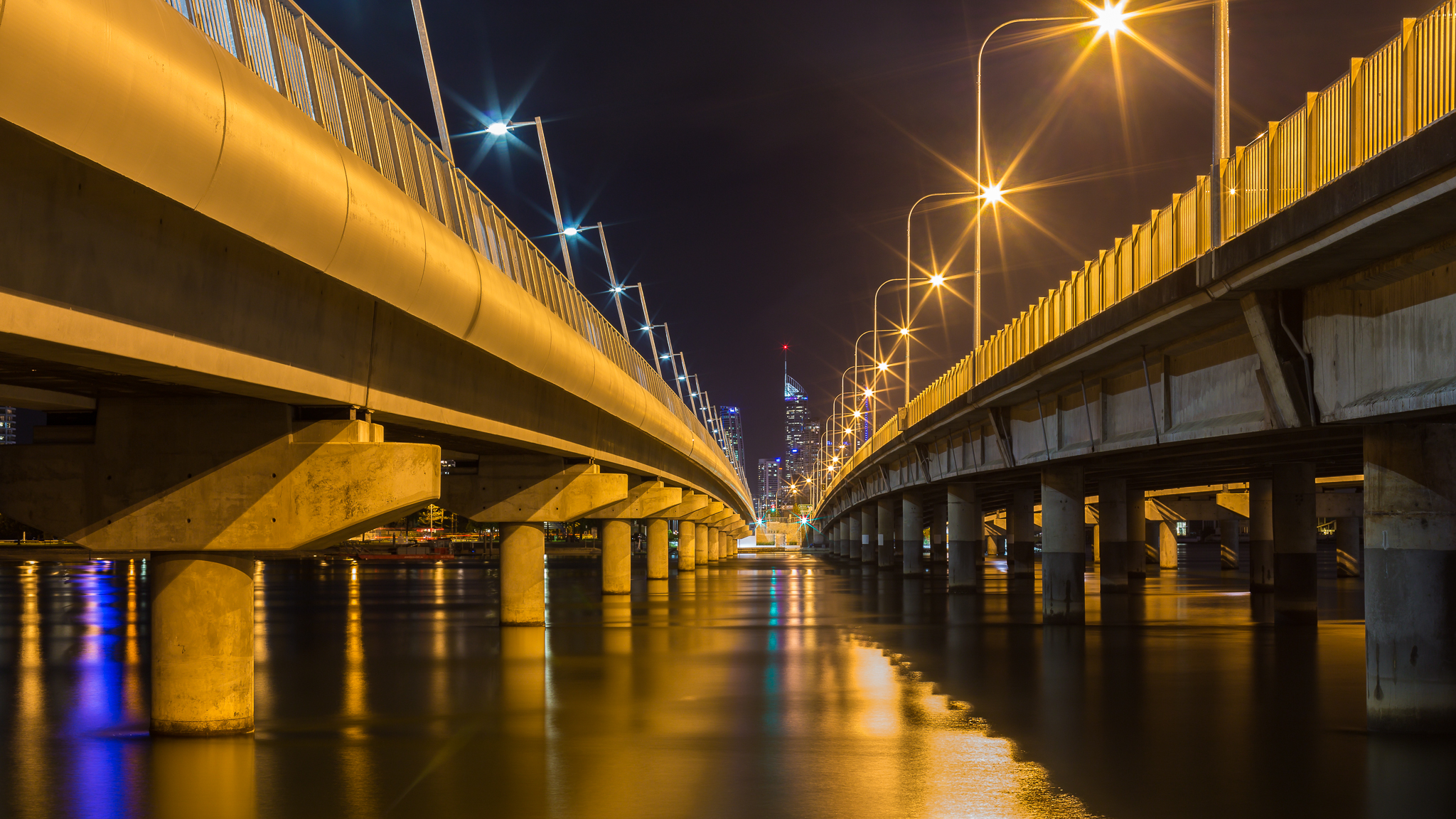
The dual carriageway portion of the Sundale Bridge at night, 2015

The dual carriageway comprising two mirrored sets of eleven concrete piers together with a concrete deck each that carries vehicular traffic was opened in 1966. In addition to vehicular traffic, a narrow pedestrian footpath formed part of the dual deck structure. In 2010 a separate set of eleven concrete piers were sited upriver adjacent to the most westerly of the existing two decks. A concrete deck completed the bridge structure and carries the Gold Coast Light Rail line that was officially opened in February 2014. A fourth structure was completed comprising twelve concrete piers that were sited downriver adjacent to the most easterly of the original two decks. A concrete deck completed the bridge structure and carries pedestrians and cyclists as a footbridge, opened in June 2014.

== See also ==
- Nerang River Crossings
- List of bridges
