= Brisbane North Institute of TAFE =

Brisbane North Institute of TAFE now known as TAFE Queensland Brisbane
- Type: TAFE Institute
- Students: 25,000
- Location: Brisbane, Queensland, Australia
- Campus: Bracken Ridge, Caboolture, Grovely, Ithaca (Red Hill), Redcliffe, and South Brisbane
- Website: www.bn.tafe.qld.gov.au/

Brisbane North Institute of TAFE (BNIT) was a public TAFE training provider in Queensland, Australia.

BNIT had campuses located at Bracken Ridge, Caboolture, Grovely, Ithaca (Red Hill), Redcliffe.

On 19 May 2014 Brisbane North Institute of TAFE amalgamated with Southbank Institute of Technology and Metropolitan South Institute of TAFE to become TAFE Queensland Brisbane under the new statutory body called TAFE Queensland. BNIT had links with local universities enabling graduating students credit towards a university qualification.

BNIT serviced approx 25,000 students at the local, national and international level.
