= TAFE Queensland Gold Coast =

Defunct educational organization in Australia

- Motto: Make Great Happen
- Type: Technical and further education
- Established: 2013
- Location: Gold Coast, Queensland, Australia
- Website: tafeqld.edu.au

TAFE Queensland Gold Coast was formed from the Gold Coast Institute of TAFE (or GCIT) in 2013 on 1 July. The vocational education and training (VET) organisation services the Gold Coast region of Queensland, Australia, with six campuses across suburbs including Southport, Coomera, Ashmore, Coolangatta and Robina.

As of 1 July 2017, TAFE Queensland Gold Coast was consolidated with TAFE Queensland's five other regional registered training organisations (RTOs) to form a single RTO. TAFE Queensland Gold Coast no longer exists as a separate RTO.

== Campus locations ==
- Ashmore
- Coolangatta
- Coomera
- Coomera Marine
- Robina
- Southport

== See also ==
- TAFE Queensland
