= Southbank Institute of Technology =

Former technical college in Queensland, Australia

Southbank Institute of Technology logo

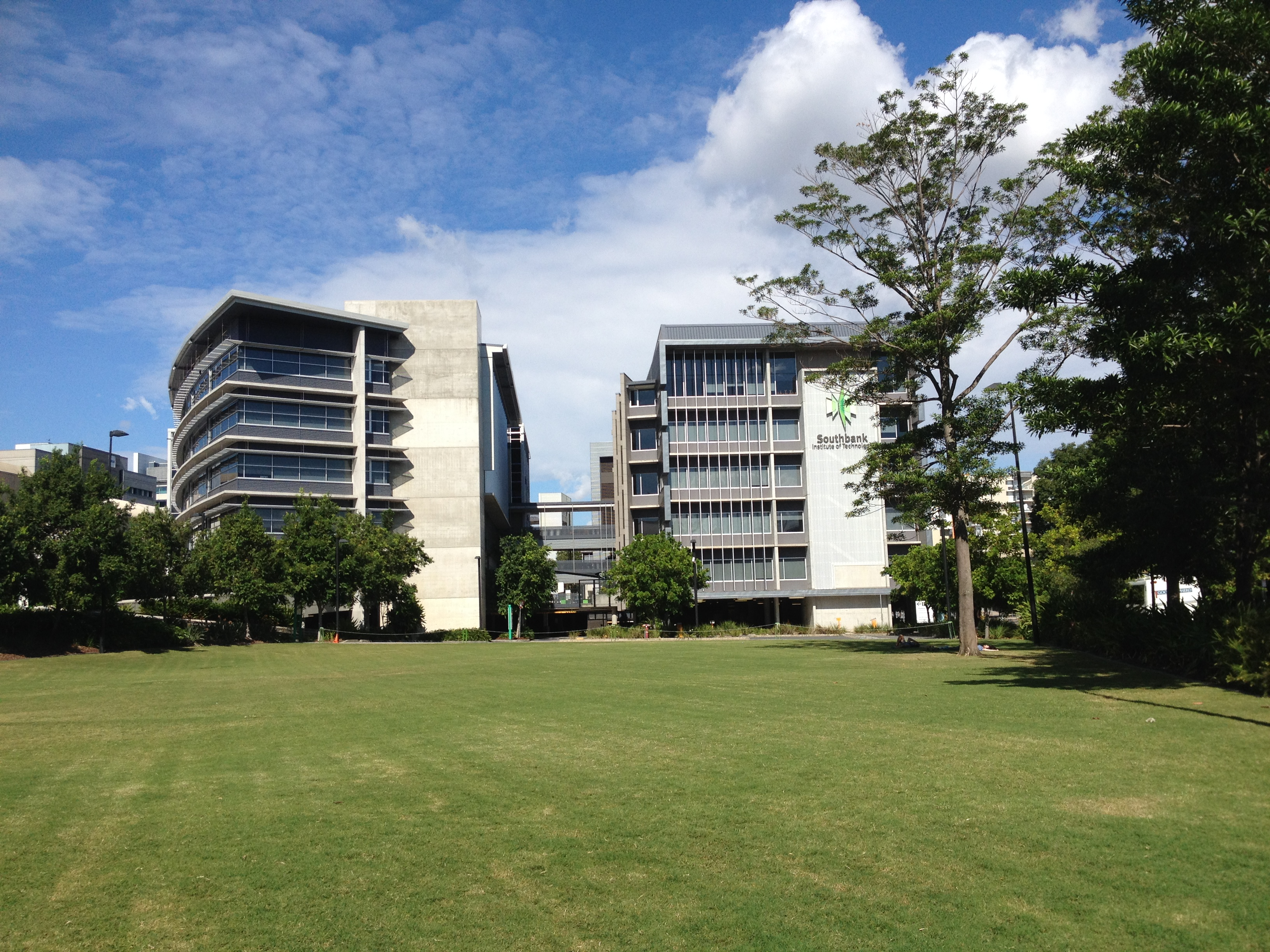
Southbank Institute of Technology

The Southbank Institute of Technology (formerly known as Southbank Institute of TAFE or SBIT) was a Technical and Further Education college in Queensland, Australia. SBIT operated in the highly competitive post secondary education sector within South-East Queensland, and received a significant proportion of government funding (about 60%.) The college offered 300 courses and each year approx 30,000 students passed through its doors. SBIT also provided fee for service style courses and corporate training.

The Institute has undergone several redevelopment projects (hundreds of millions of dollars) to rebuild and revamp facilities. This major renewal project was initiated by the Queensland government through the first Public-Private Partnership (PPP) in Queensland.

On 19 May 2014 SBIT ceased operations as a statutory body and amalgamated with Brisbane North Institute of TAFE and Metropolitan South Institute of TAFE to become TAFE Queensland Brisbane (region) under new statutory body called TAFE Queensland.

The Seven Hills location ceased operations in 2010 but the Southbank campus of TAFE Queensland Brisbane remains open on the south bank of the Brisbane River.

The Southbank campus location is a popular destination for international students and has agreements in place with many universities to receive credit on a University degree for diploma level courses completed at Southbank.

Like many of the TAFE Queensland campus locations Southbank is provisioned with Information Systems, including Blackboard for Online Delivery, EPS Library Portal and Careers Hub Student employment system.

== See also ==
- Southbank Institute
- TAFE Queensland
