= Australia Fair =

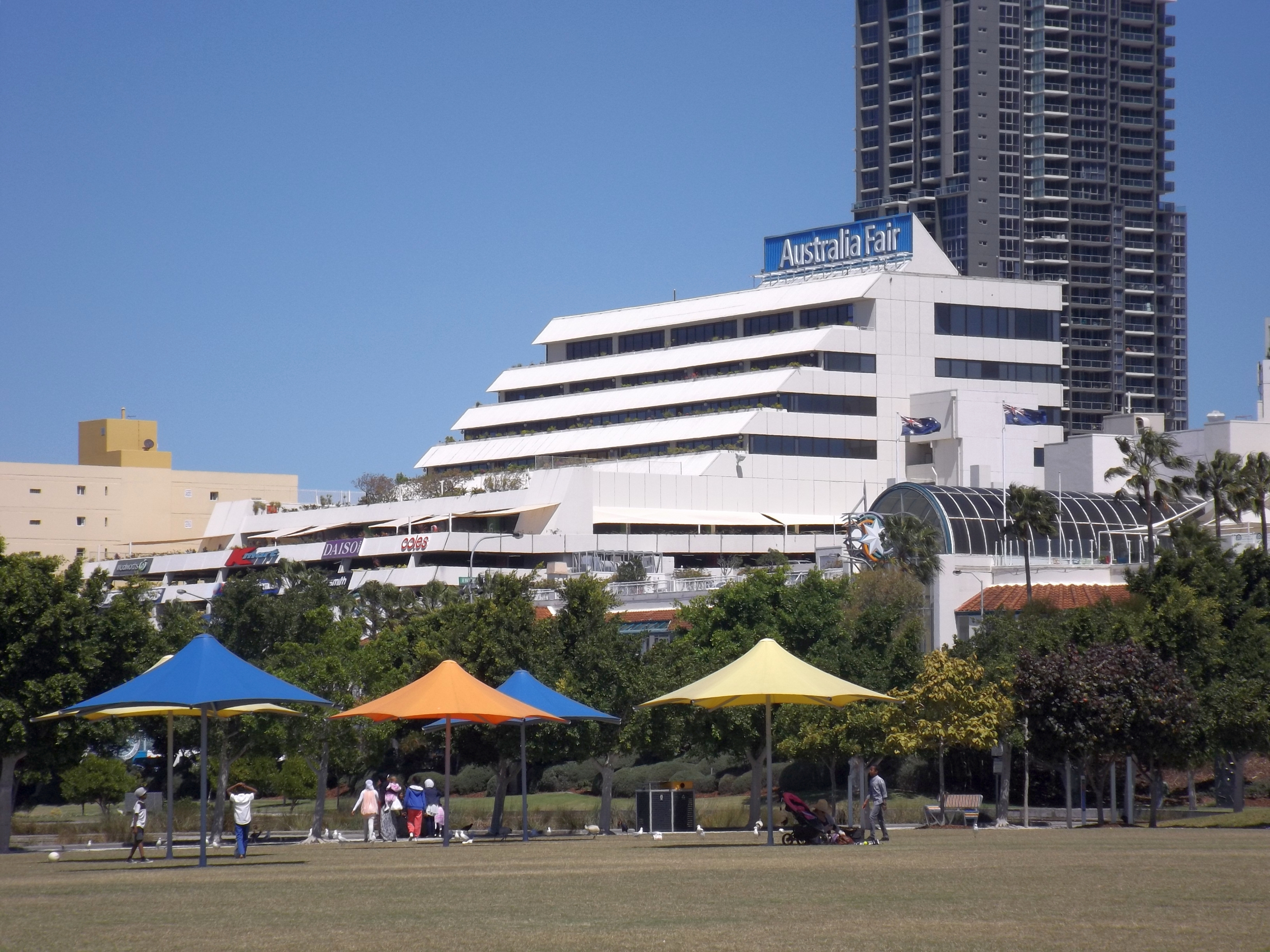
- Upper level offices, 2015
- Location: Southport, Gold Coast, Queensland
- Coordinates: 27.9689°S 153.4155°E
- Address: 42 Marine Parade
- Owner: Retail First Pty Ltd
- Num. of stores: 230
- Num. of anchor tenants: 5
- Website: www.australiafair.com.au

Australia Fair Shopping Centre is a dual-level regional shopping centre covering 59,540 square metres (640,900 sq ft) located in Southport, Gold Coast, Queensland. The centre incorporates a five-level office tower comprising 5,824 square metres (62,690 sq ft) of office space, housing specialist services and commercial offices.

== History ==
=== 1983 ===
Australia Fair West, originally known as Scarborough Fair, was built and anchored by Franklins. It was constructed on the former site of administrative and bottling buildings for the South Coast Co-Operative Dairy Association, which was designed by architects T.R. Hall and L.B. Phillips in 1936 on the corner of Scarborough and Young Streets. The dairy buildings were demolished in 1972. Australia Fair West contained Franklins, Treasureway, and 40 specialty shops with off-road parking.

=== 1984 ===
Scarborough Fair was built incorporating a Coles Supermarket and Kmart Store.

=== 1989 ===
The Scarborough Fair Shopping Centre doubled its size and extended through to the pedestrianised Nerang Street Mall. Work on the Australia Fair Shopping Centre was centred around the old Scarborough Fair Retail Centre, with retail anchors including Kmart, Coles, Woolworths, and Franklins.

=== 1990 ===
Australia Fair opened on 10 April 1990, after a project that took more than a year and $300 million to complete. Upon completion, Australia Fair Shopping Centre boasted the largest concentration of specialty stores and was the only shopping centre in Australia to feature three supermarket chains: Woolworths, Coles, and Franklins.

=== 1993 ===
An extension introduced the centre to a six-cinema complex and also created a Leisure Court Retail precinct.

=== 1995 ===
The Fashion Boulevard, Broadwater Food Court and Fresh Food Marketplace were refurbished and renamed to establish these precincts. The owner acquired the ex-State School site next to Australia Fair West for expansion purposes.

=== 1997–1998 ===
Extensions were completed, cinemas expanded from 6 to 10 and reconfiguration of the Cinema Leisure Court Retail/Entertainment precinct.

=== 1998–1999 ===
Colonial First State acquired joint-venture ownership of Australia Fair with MEPC. The sale deal also included the former state school redevelopment site on Garden Street. 'Australia Fair set for $16m upgrade'... Owners announced a $16 million refurbishment and upgrade. A significant aspect of the refurbishment involves upgrading the Fig Tree Food Court, remodeling tenancies, adding a weatherproof structure, and replacing an escalator.

=== 2001 ===
Gordon Fu purchases Australia Fair from Colonial First State.

=== 2002–2004 ===
$2.7 million spent on an upgrade to flooring, directional signage and amenities/facilities upgrade which enhances the centre's appearance and image for Southport.

=== 2012 ===
On 5 March 2012, arborists removed a 130-year-old fig tree and two younger fig trees, clones of the original plant, were planted in its place prior to their own removal in a subsequent upgrade.

=== 2014 ===
In 2014 redevelopment began on Australia Fair West to incorporate new restaurants and shops, to modernise the area of Southport as part of the Chinatown precinct and to make Southport into a central business district for the Gold Coast. This western side was renamed Australia Fair Metro and continues to be linked by an overpass walkway over Scarborough Street to the eastern cinema complex and shopping precinct.

== Anchors ==
- Event Cinemas
- Coles
- Woolworths
- Kmart
- JB Hi-Fi

== Parking and public transport ==
The centre has undercover and rooftop parking for 2,500 cars, located off Marine Parade.

The Southport light rail station is located on the corner of Nerang Street and Scarborough Street and provides tram connections to the Gold Coast University Hospital and south towards Surfers Paradise and Broadbeach. Southport Bus Station, one of the main bus stations in the city provides regular and high frequency services to Helensvale Station, Robina, Sea World/Main Beach and Biggera Waters.

== Notable incidents ==
=== 2025 ===
On 10 March at approximately 8:30am, fire engine crews arrived at the site in Southport after receiving multiple reports of smoke and fire. Smoke was then discovered coming from a switchboard at the front of the centre at Marine Pde. The centre was evacuated immediately. This event was preceded by Tropical Cyclone Alfred, which hit Southern Queensland and Northern New South Wales, however, the cause of the fire is yet to be announced.
