= TAFE Queensland =

Australian vocational education and training provider

- Motto: Make Great Happen
- Type: Technical and further education
- Established: 1882
- Website: tafeqld.edu.au

TAFE Queensland is the statutory body responsible for the delivery of technical and further education (TAFE) in the Australian state of Queensland. Established in 1882, it is the state's largest public provider of vocational education and training (VET), offering qualifications ranging from certificates and diplomas to bachelor's degrees across multiple campuses and international programs. The organisation operates as a government-owned statutory authority and plays a central role in Queensland's vocational education system.

== History ==
The origins of TAFE Queensland date back to 1882, when technical colleges and vocational institutions were established across Queensland to provide formal skills training for trades and emerging industries. For more than a century, these institutions operated as locally and regionally administered providers, responding to workforce needs within their respective communities.

Significant structural reform occurred in the early 2010s as part of broader Queensland Government vocational education policy. On 1 July 2013, the state's TAFE institutes were reorganised into six regional Registered Training Organisations (RTOs): Brisbane, East Coast, Gold Coast, North, SkillsTech, and South West. This reform aimed to streamline governance and improve consistency across the public training system.

On 1 July 2014, TAFE Queensland was formally established as a statutory authority under the TAFE Queensland Act 2013, consolidating oversight of public vocational education and training within a single legal entity.

Further consolidation followed on 1 July 2017, when the six regional RTOs were progressively unified into a single statewide RTO. This transition marked a shift toward centralised governance, quality assurance, and curriculum coordination across Queensland's public training network.

== Governance and organisation ==
TAFE Queensland operates as a statutory body of the Queensland Government and is registered as both an RTO and a Registered Higher Education Provider under Australia's national regulatory frameworks. The organisation is authorised to deliver VET and higher education qualifications and holds limited self-accrediting status for certain courses, subject to regulatory oversight.

Governance is guided by Queensland legislation and government policy, with accountability mechanisms designed to ensure compliance with national training standards, financial management requirements, and public sector obligations.

== Organisational structure ==
Following the consolidation into a single RTO, TAFE Queensland operates as an integrated statewide training organisation. Former regional institutes and specialist entities, including SkillsTech, were incorporated into the unified structure. SkillsTech historically focused on trade and technical training and continues to contribute specialised expertise within the broader organisational framework.

== Campuses and facilities ==
TAFE Queensland operates more than 60 locations throughout Queensland, including facilities in metropolitan Brisbane, regional centres, and remote communities. Campuses are equipped with purpose-built training environments such as workshops, laboratories, studios, training clinics, and digital learning spaces to support practical, skills-based instruction.

=== Campuses by region ===
TAFE Queensland's operations are organised into regional divisions, including:

- TAFE Queensland Brisbane
- TAFE Queensland Gold Coast
- TAFE Queensland Sunshine Coast
- TAFE Queensland Darling Downs and South West
- TAFE Queensland Wide Bay Burnett
- TAFE Queensland Far North Queensland
- TAFE Queensland North Queensland

== Courses and qualifications ==
TAFE Queensland delivers vocational education and training across a broad range of industries. Qualifications are aligned with the Australian Qualifications Framework (AQF) and include certificates, diplomas, advanced diplomas, and bachelor's degrees.

Courses are offered through multiple delivery modes, including on-campus study, online learning, apprenticeships, traineeships, and secondary school pathways such as TAFE at School. Recognition of Prior Learning (RPL) is available for eligible students.

=== Fields of study ===
- Business and information technology
- Creative industries
- Health and science
- Infrastructure and transport
- Trades
- Service industries
- Environment and animal services

=== Qualifications ===
- Certificate I
- Certificate II
- Certificate III
- Certificate IV
- Diploma
- Advanced Diploma
- Associate Degree
- Bachelor's degree
- Undergraduate Certificate
- Graduate Certificate
- Graduate Diploma
- Master's Degree

== International education ==
TAFE Queensland enrols international students from a range of countries and works with education agents and partner organisations globally. The organisation has delivered offshore training programs in countries including China, Fiji, Nauru, Papua New Guinea, Timor-Leste, Panama, and Iran.

TAFE Queensland also delivers International Trainer and Assessor (ITA) qualifications, supporting the capability of vocational educators involved in international and offshore training delivery.

== Partnerships and university programs ==
TAFE Queensland maintains partnerships with Australian universities to provide articulated education pathways. One such partnership is with the University of Canberra, through which selected bachelor-level programs in creative industries are delivered at TAFE Queensland's South Bank campus, with degrees awarded by the University of Canberra.

== Economic and social contribution ==
As a public vocational education provider, TAFE Queensland contributes to workforce development across multiple sectors, including construction, health care, logistics, manufacturing, and digital technologies. An independent economic analysis conducted by KPMG in 2023 assessed TAFE Queensland's contribution to the Queensland economy, identifying both direct economic activity and broader community impacts.

The organisation also supports regional development initiatives and delivers training in areas where market provision is limited, particularly in regional and remote communities.

== Awards and recognition ==
TAFE Queensland has received the Large Training Provider of the Year award at the Queensland Training Awards on multiple occasions since its establishment as a statutory authority, including between 2015 and 2018 and from 2021 to 2024.

In 2023, TAFE Queensland received the national Large Training Provider of the Year award at the Australian Training Awards.

== See also ==
- Education in Australia
- TAFE Queensland Brisbane
- TAFE Queensland Gold Coast
- TAFE Queensland East Coast
- TAFE Queensland South West
- TAFE Queensland SkillsTech
- TAFE Queensland North
