= Paradise Point, Queensland =

Paradise Point
- Suburb
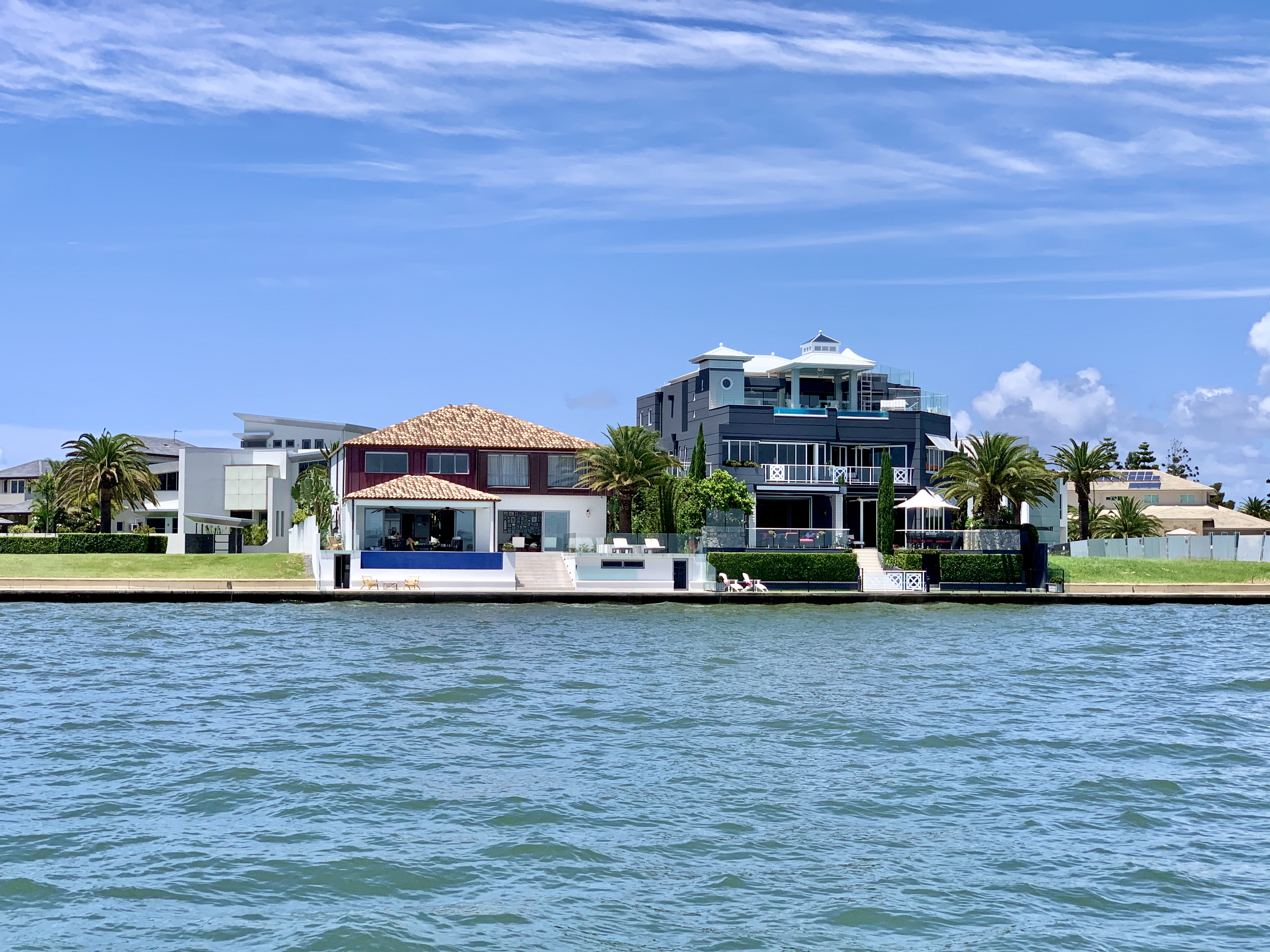
- Houses on Sovereign Islands

- Interactive map of Paradise Point
- Coordinates: 27.8802°S 153.3963°E
- Country: Australia
- State: Queensland
- City: Gold Coast
- LGA: City of Gold Coast
- Location: 15.1 km (9.4 mi) N of Surfers Paradise; 68 km (42 mi) SE of Brisbane; 11 km (6.8 mi) N of Southport; 52 km (32 mi) NNW of Tweed Heads

Government
  - State electorate: Broadwater
  - Federal division: Fadden

Area
  - Total: 6.4 km^{2} (2.5 sq mi)
- Elevation: 5 m (16 ft)

Population
  - Total: 7,062 (2021 census)
  - Density: 1,103/km^{2} (2,858/sq mi)
- Time zone: UTC+10:00 (AEST)
- Postcode: 4216
Suburbs around Paradise Point
Hope Island	Southern Moreton Bay Islands	Southern Moreton Bay Islands
Helensvale	Paradise Point	South Stradbroke
Coombabah	Hollywell	South Stradbroke

Paradise Point is a coastal suburb in the City of Gold Coast, Queensland, Australia. In the 2021 census, Paradise Point had a population of 7,062 people.

== Geography ==
The suburb lies on the Gold Coast Broadwater with direct access to the Coomera River. The area is protected by South Stradbroke Island which lies off the coast. With access to two major water ways, several boat ramps and marinas have been built. Two developments, built out into the local waters, are only accessible from Paradise Point. Sovereign Islands is a canal estate development at the northern point off Paradise Point, accessible by bridge and road named the Sovereign Mile. Ephraim Island is situated at the southern end, a secure Island development joined to Paradise Point by bridge via Falkinder Avenue. Paradise Point Village shops on the esplanade include a post office, a news agent, medical clinic and food outlets and eateries. Jabiru Island in the west remains undeveloped in Phil Hill Environmental Park.

Paradise Point has many properties worth millions of dollars. A 2014 property survey revealed King Charles Drive as having the fourth highest number of million-dollar houses in Queensland.

== Demographics ==
In the 2006 census, Paradise Point had a population of 5,115 people.

In the 2011 census, Paradise Point had a population of 5,930 people, following from the development of Ephraim Island and Sovereign Islands.

In the 2016 census, Paradise Point had a population of 6,536 people.

In the 2021 census, Paradise Point had a population of 7,062 people.

== Education ==
There are no schools in Paradise Point. The nearest government schools is Coombabah State School (primary) and Coombabah State High School (secondary), both in neighbouring Coombabah to the south-west.

== Amenities ==
The esplanade parklands along the east side of the suburb makes it a locally popular area for casual waterfront park picnics and recreation. As part of a Gold Coast parks upgrade the local esplanade acquired new children's playground, public amenities, barbecue facilities and picnic shelters.

Outdoor Arts & Crafts markets are held on fourth Sunday of each month from 7am to 2pm, at The Esplanade Parklands.

There is a community based, not-for-profit sailing club, senior citizens' association and community centre. The suburb has a Bowls Club with a covered green.

The Gold Coast City Council operates a fortnightly mobile library service which visits Abalone Avenue.

== Notable residents ==
- Arthur Beetson
- Jeff McCloy
- Clive Palmer
