= Southern Moreton Bay Islands, Queensland =

Southern Moreton Bay Islands
- Suburb
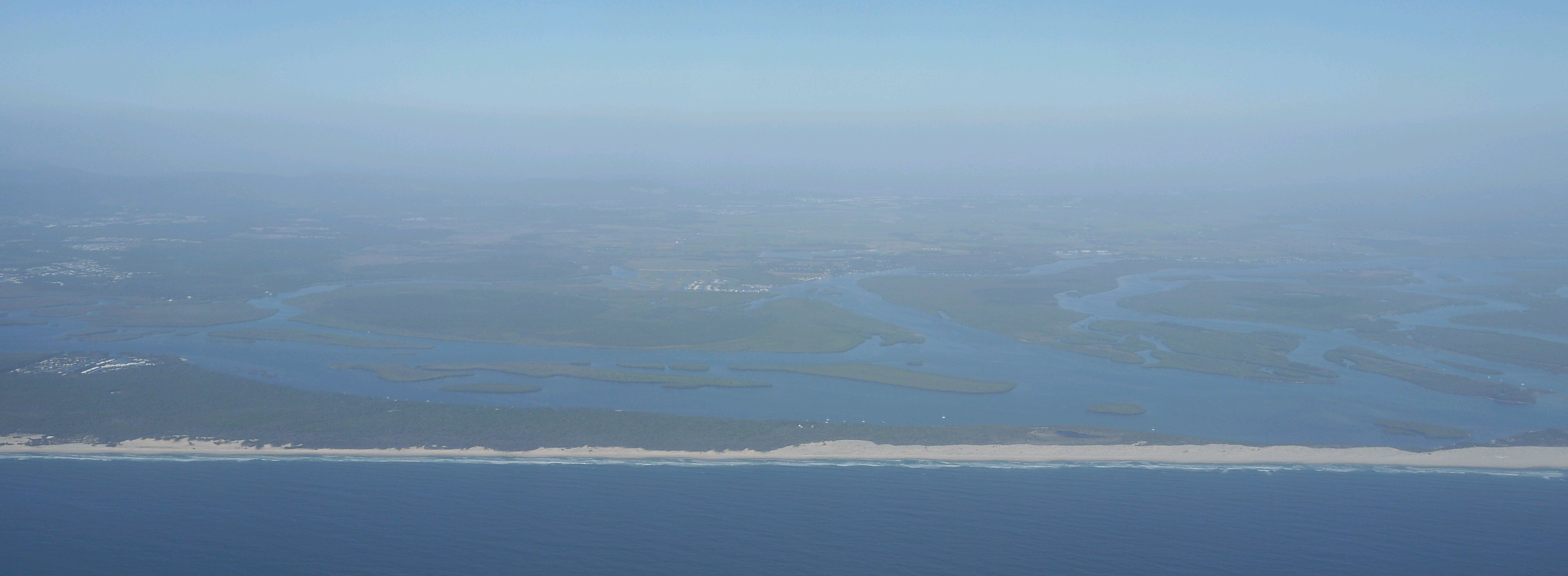
- Eden, Kangaroo and Woogoompah Islands (looking west)

- Interactive map of Southern Moreton Bay Islands
- Coordinates: 27.7805°S 153.405°E
- Country: Australia
- State: Queensland
- City: Gold Coast
- LGA: City of Gold Coast (Division 12)
- Established: 2003

Government
  - State electorate: Coomera
  - Federal division: Fadden

Area
  - Total: 83.9 km^{2} (32.4 sq mi)

Population
  - Total: 0 (2021 census)
  - Density: 0.000/km^{2} (0.000/sq mi)
- Time zone: UTC+10:00 (AEST)
- Postcode: No postcode
Suburbs around Southern Moreton Bay Islands
| Woongoolba; Steiglitz | Moreton Bay; Russell Island | North Stradbroke Island |
| Jacobs Well; Pimpama | Southern Moreton Bay Islands | South Stradbroke |
| Coomera | Hope Island; Paradise Point | South Stradbroke |

Southern Moreton Bay Islands is an island group locality in the north-east of the City of Gold Coast, Queensland, Australia. In the 2021 census, Southern Moreton Bay Islands had "no people or a very low population".

The Southern Moreton Bay Islands do not have a postcode.

== Geography ==
The locality consists of numerous very low-lying estuarine islands separated by channels in the southern part of Moreton Bay. The islands are mostly covered by mangroves, and a substantial part of the area is inundated by water at high tide.

Islands within the Southern Moreton Bay Islands:

- Cobby Cobby Island
- Coomera Island
- Crusoe Island
- Eden Island
- Kangaroo Island (Boonnahbah)
- Mosquito Islands
- Short Island
- Brocks Island
- Rat Island
- Tabby Tabby Island
- Woogoompah Island

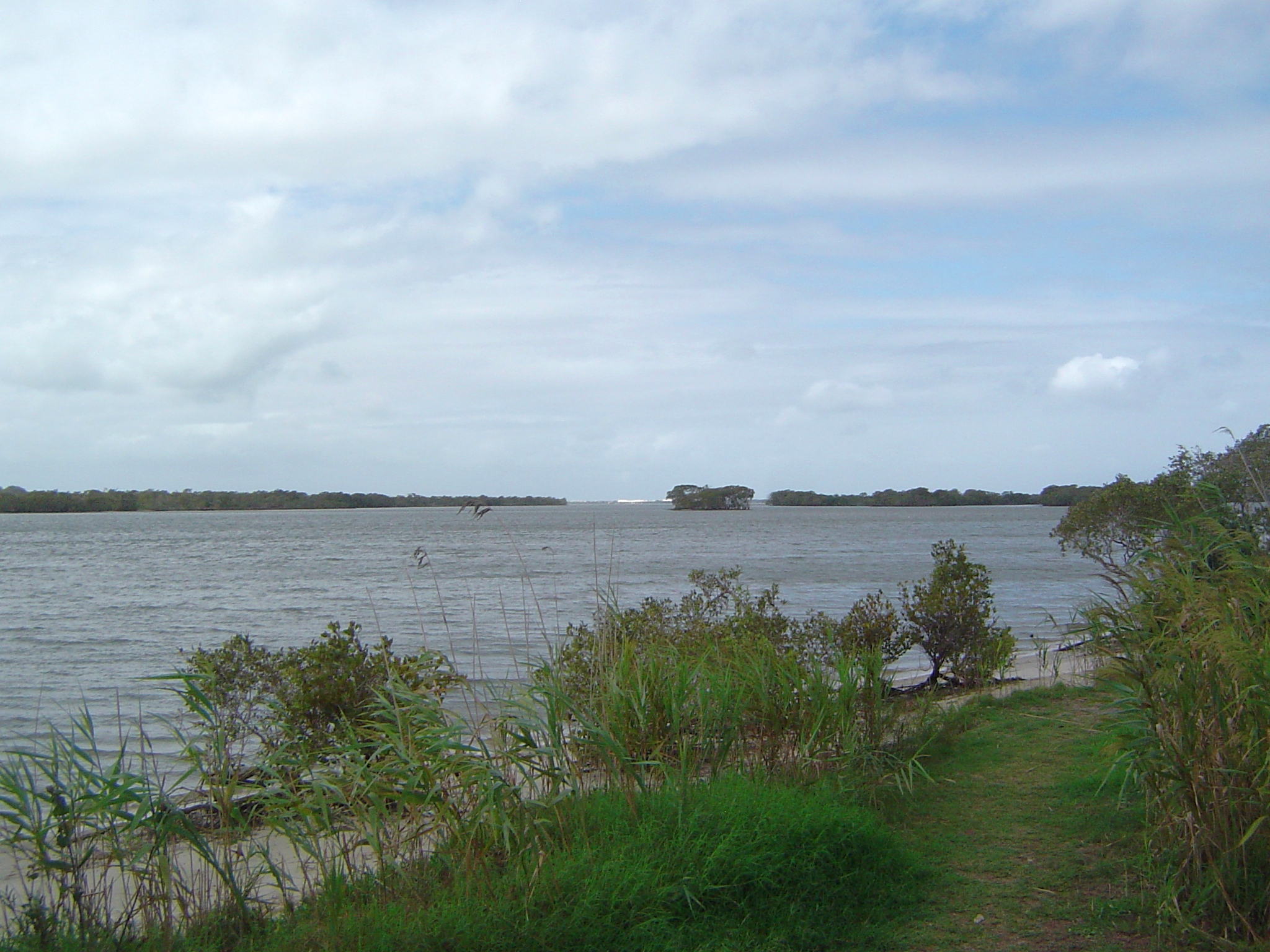
Tipplers Passage with Kangaroo Island in the background on left, 2014

Passages and channels within the Southern Moreton Bay Islands:

- Canaipa Passage
- Cobby Passage
- Coomera River (North Branch)
- Coomera River (South Branch)
- Jewel Creek
- Main Channel
- The Broadwater
- Tiger Mullet Channel
- Pimpama River
- Whalleys Gutter

Several of the islands within the suburb are protected as the Southern Moreton Bay Islands National Park. Most of the channels are protected as part of the Moreton Bay Marine Park.

Additional protection for fish habitat is provided by the Jumpinpin-Broadwater Fish Habitat Area declared on 19 November 1983. The habitat of sea grass meadows and shallow estuarine areas are protected for a variety of sea life.

== History ==
Southern Moreton Bay Islands was officially gazetted as a locality on 7 February 2003.

== Demographics ==
In the 2011 census, Southern Moreton Bay Islands had "no people or a very low population".

In the 2016 census, Southern Moreton Bay Islands had "no people or a very low population".

In the 2021 census, Southern Moreton Bay Islands had "no people or a very low population".

== Education ==
There are no schools in the Southern Moreton Bay Islands.

== See also ==
- Southern Moreton Bay Islands National Park
- Southern Moreton Bay Islands (Redland City), the adjacent area in Redland City consisting of several island suburbs.
