= Southport Pier, Gold Coast =

Pier in Southport, Gold Coast, Queensland

Coordinates: 27.97305°S 153.42087°E

Southport Pier
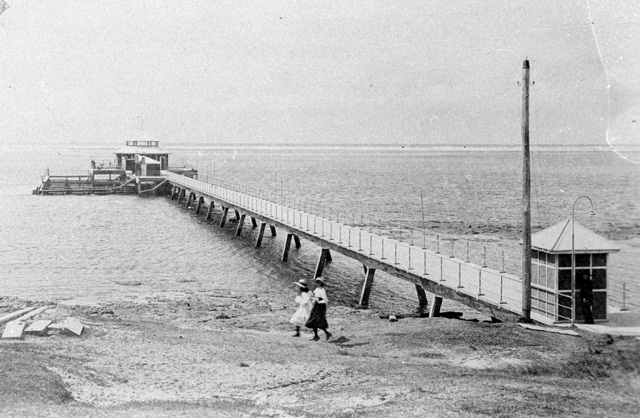
- Southport Pier, 1915
- Spans: Gold Coast Broadwater
- Location: Gold Coast

Characteristics
- Total length: 200 feet (61 m), extended to 900 feet (270 m)

History
- Opening date: 28 November 1883, re-opened 2009
- Closure date: 1969

Southport Pier is a pier spanning the Gold Coast Broadwater in Southport, a suburb on the Gold Coast in South East Queensland, Australia. The current pier was constructed in 2009, replacing a previous structure demolished in 1969.

== History ==
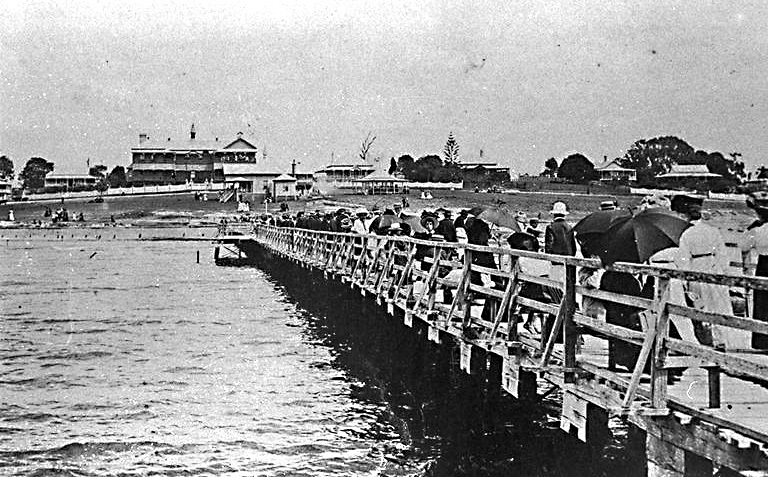
Southport Pier, 1910

Located in the sheltered Broadwater, the pier and its surrounds was an attraction to visitors in the late 19th and the first half of the 20th century who sailed along the coast or, after the arrival of the railway, traveled down from Brisbane by steam train. Passengers were also transported to Brisbane via steamboats.

Southport has had a number of jetties along the curve of beach between the mouth of the Nerang River and Deep Water Point in Labrador, some of them operating concurrently, since the 1870s. Without a wharf or similar structure it was not possible to land goods or passengers directly onto the shore without using a smaller boat.

Differing opinions were held within the growing township as to the best position for a wharf or jetty. In February 1879 two delegations traveled to Brisbane to put forward their respective cases. One group was in favour of constructing the jetty in a position central to the township which they anticipated growing northwards. The other group preferred the jetty to be built to the south where the current owners were selling lots.

The first permanent jetty in Southport was built to the south of the township near the mouth of the Nerang River opposite the Southport Hotel near the present day northern approach of the Gold Coast Bridge. Originally owned by Richard Gardiner, in early 1878 the Southport Hotel was sold to William Charles Maund who constructed a substantial jetty the following year. The jetty was designed by H. Barnes who was part of the first survey trip by the Harbours and Rivers Department mapping local waterways. The survey party were staying at the hotel which was, at the time, the only accommodation in the area. It was built by private subscription for £52 and was approximately 280 foot long and six foot wide. The jetty included a tram track along its length to aid in unloading and transferring luggage and other items from the steamers arriving at Southport It opened in late 1879 with additional work undertaken to create a channel between the new jetty and Deepwater Point at Labrador. By May 1880, it was reported that Maund, the hotelier, had substantially enlarged the existing jetty.

In January 1880 a deputation of local residents visited the Acting Colonial Treasurer to request that the State Government construct a jetty able to meet their needs. The visit did not result in the Government committing funds, and it was suggested that the people of Southport or the local Divisional Board fund the endeavor. Upon the return of the deputation, a meeting of local residents was called in February at which the proposed jetty was discussed. In November the local residents met again to consider borrowing £600 to build the jetty.

A second jetty was erected further north near the Pacific Hotel in the vicinity of the intersection of The Esplanade and Nerang Street which, by September 1881, was reported as being partially completed but in use. In October 1881 the growth of the township was being reported in local newspapers and the 'new jetty' is mentioned.

Neither of the jetties were able to fully meet the needs of the local community. The jetty near the mouth of the river could not be used in low tide while the pier in front of the Pacific Hotel was not easily approached by steamers. The decision was made to build a third jetty incorporating the existing structure in front of the Pacific Hotel. After an unsuccessful attempt to raise the funds by public subscription, the money for the third jetty was provided by E. J. Stevens and John Cameron. The Queensland Government provided the lease for land on the water front and William David Nisbet, the engineer of the Harbours and Rivers Department, assisted with specifications and drew the plans. The owners leased the structure for three years to the Southport Divisional Board.

On Wednesday 28 November 1883 the township's third jetty was opened with the 'whole of Southport' in attendance. To keep building costs low, the new jetty used reclaimed railway rails in its construction. This was reported as being one of the first times this method of construction was known to have been used. The new jetty was 800 foot long and had a goods shed and waiting room surrounded by a verandah on three sides. This extended structure was to become known as the Southport Pier.

In 1886 the Southport Divisional Board announced that it intended to build a new pier and goods shed near the site of the 'old jetty near Balmer's hotel' at a cost of £600. In 1886 Balmer had taken over the Southport Hotel from Maund. In 1887 the Divisional Board were reporting that the existing jetty at the river mouth remained in private hands but the foreshore and surrounds, which were the responsibly of local government, were suffering from erosion. By 1888, the local community still did not have access to a free public jetty.

Within a few years, the Southport Pier near the Pacific Hotel had been extended to 900 feet (270 m) and a bathing enclosure was built against the pier for locals and visitors to enjoy protected sea bathing. It was during this same period that construction of the Southport Sea Wall along the foreshore began.

The Southport Pier and Baths Company leased—and ultimately sold—the pier to the Southport Divisional Board. In 1913, the timber structure was replaced with a concrete one.

The very popular Pier Theatre opened in December 1926 and offered a venue for movies, dances and general entertainment. The first theatre was destroyed by fire in 1932 and rebuilt that same year. Both the pier and theatre were demolished in 1969.

== Current structure ==
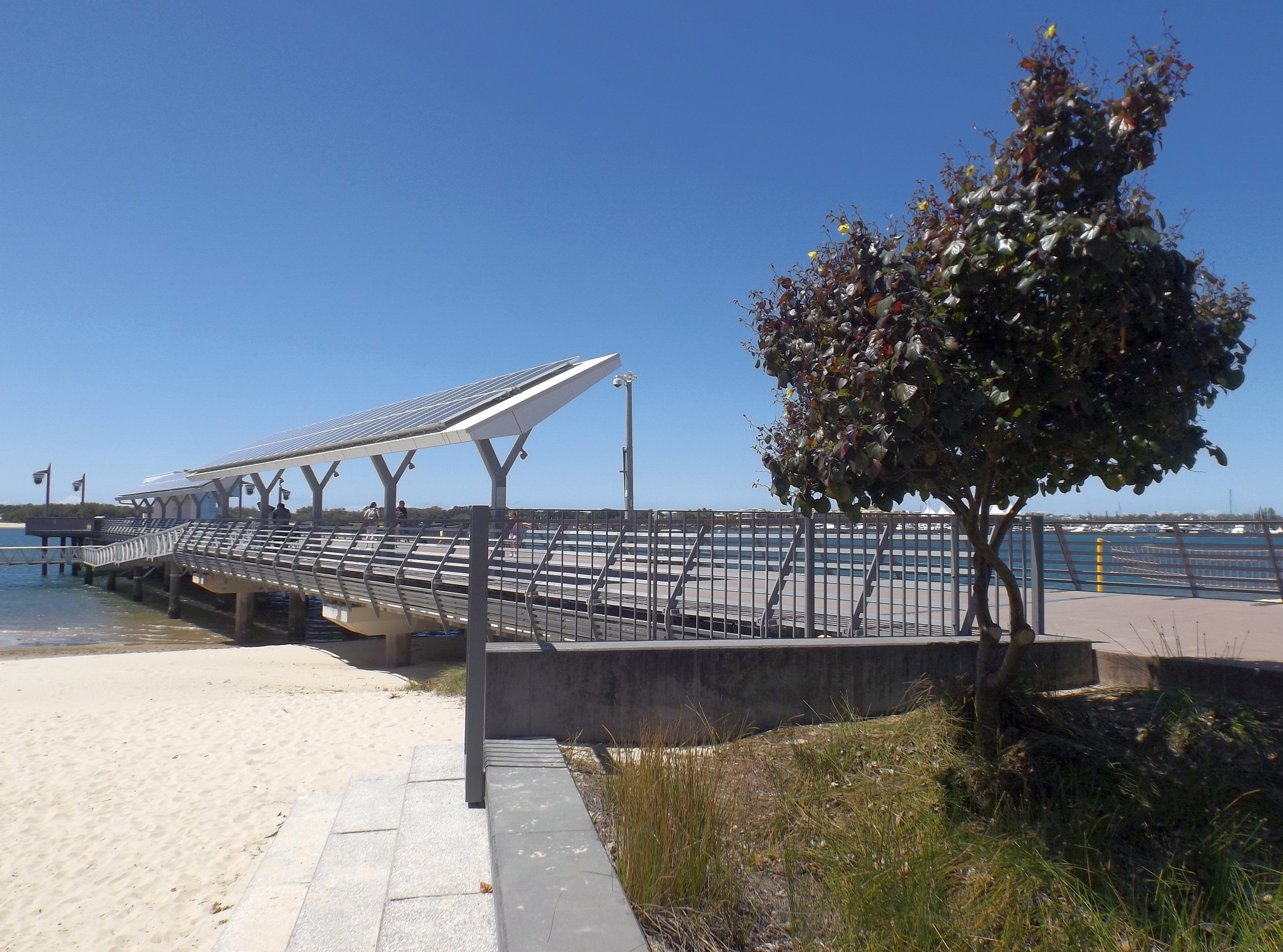
Pier in 2015

A new pier was constructed in 2009. Its length is 100 metres (330 ft).

== See also ==
- List of piers
- Southport Broadwater Parklands
