= Gold Coast Broadwater =

Body of water in Gold Coast, Queensland

- Southport Broadwater, Gold Coast Harbour, and The Broadwater
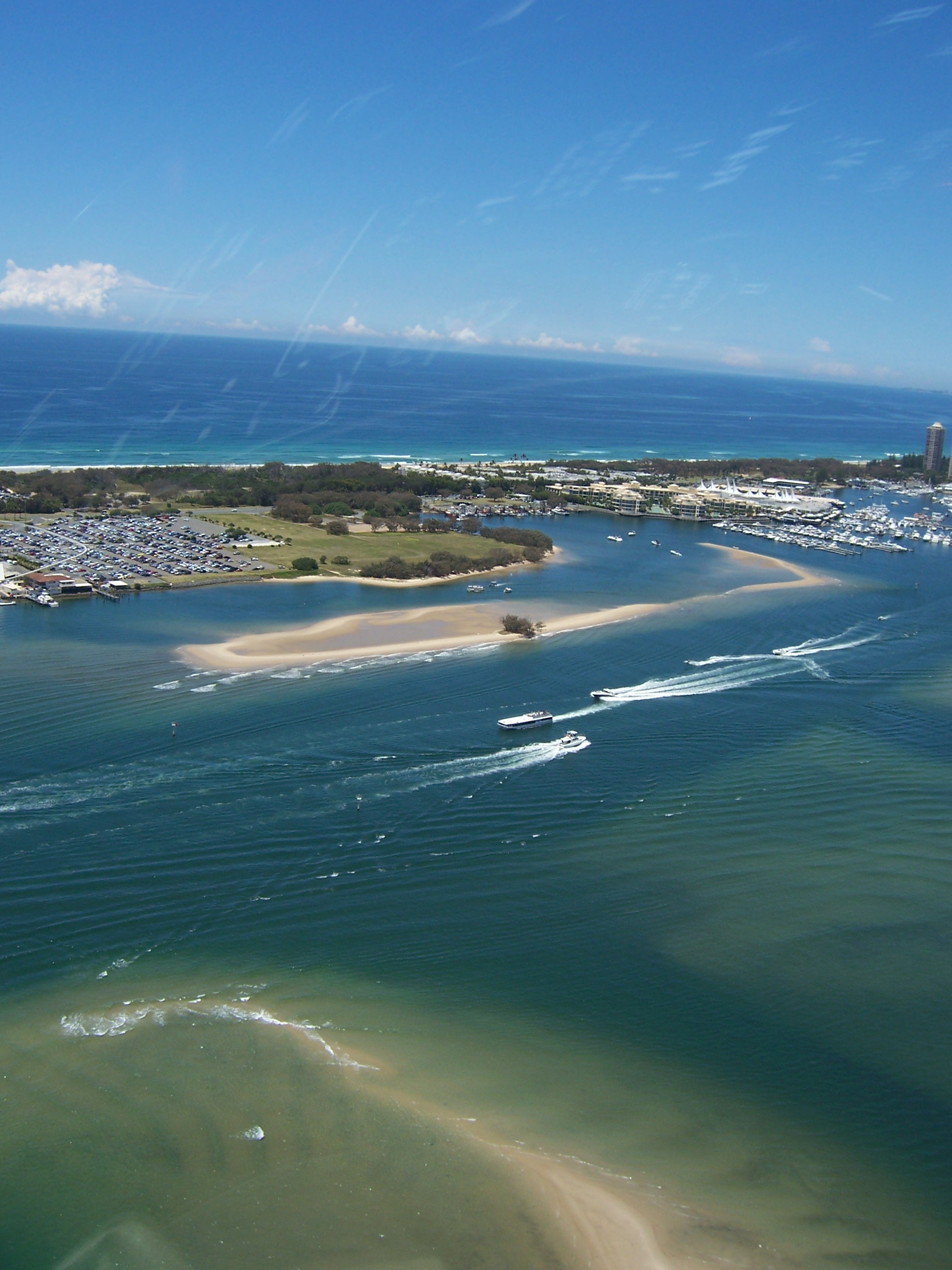
- View from a helicopter over Southport across the Broadwater to Main Beach and the Pacific Ocean beyond, 2006

- Location of the Broadwater in Queensland
- Location: Gold Coast, South East Queensland
- Coordinates: 27°57′57″S 153°25′16″E
- Part of: Moreton Bay Marine Park
- River sources: Coomera, Nerang, and Pimpama Rivers; Loders, Biggera, Behm, and Wasp Creeks
- Primary outflows: Jumpinpin Bar (north); Gold Coast Seaway (south)
- Ocean/sea sources: South Pacific Ocean; Coral Sea
- Basin countries: Australia
- Average depth: 1.74 m (5 ft 9 in)
- Max. depth: 9 m (30 ft)
- Salinity: 33 ppt
- Surface elevation: 2 m (6 ft 7 in)
- Frozen: never
- Islands: Crab, Ephraim, Wave Break
- Settlements: Gold Coast

The Gold Coast Broadwater, also known as the Southport Broadwater or simply the Broadwater, is a large shallow estuary located in the Gold Coast, Queensland, Australia. Connected directly to the Coral Sea towards its southern end via the artificial Gold Coast Seaway, which stabilised the formerly northward moving mouth of the Nerang River, the estuary reaches from the locality of Southport in the south, to the southern section of the UNESCO World Heritage Listed Moreton Bay in the north, through which it is also connected to the sea. The Broadwater is separated from the ocean by South Stradbroke Island north of the seaway and Southport Spit to the south. The original body of water was a lagoon formed by water from the Nerang River entering the area behind the former Stradbroke Island (now split in two). Part of the Broadwater is contained within the Moreton Bay Marine Park.

== Location and features ==
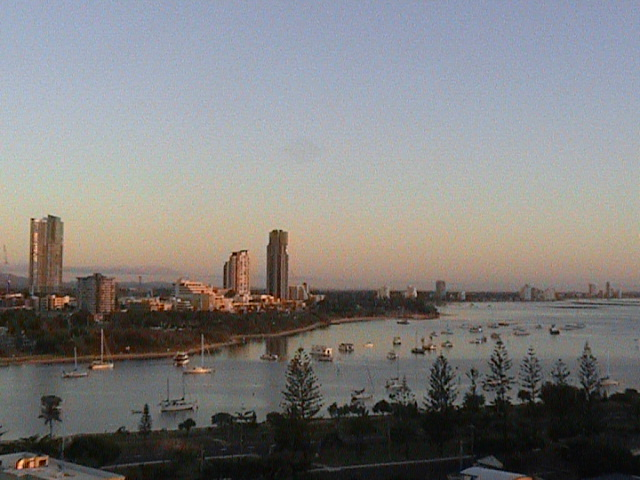
Looking north over the Broadwater

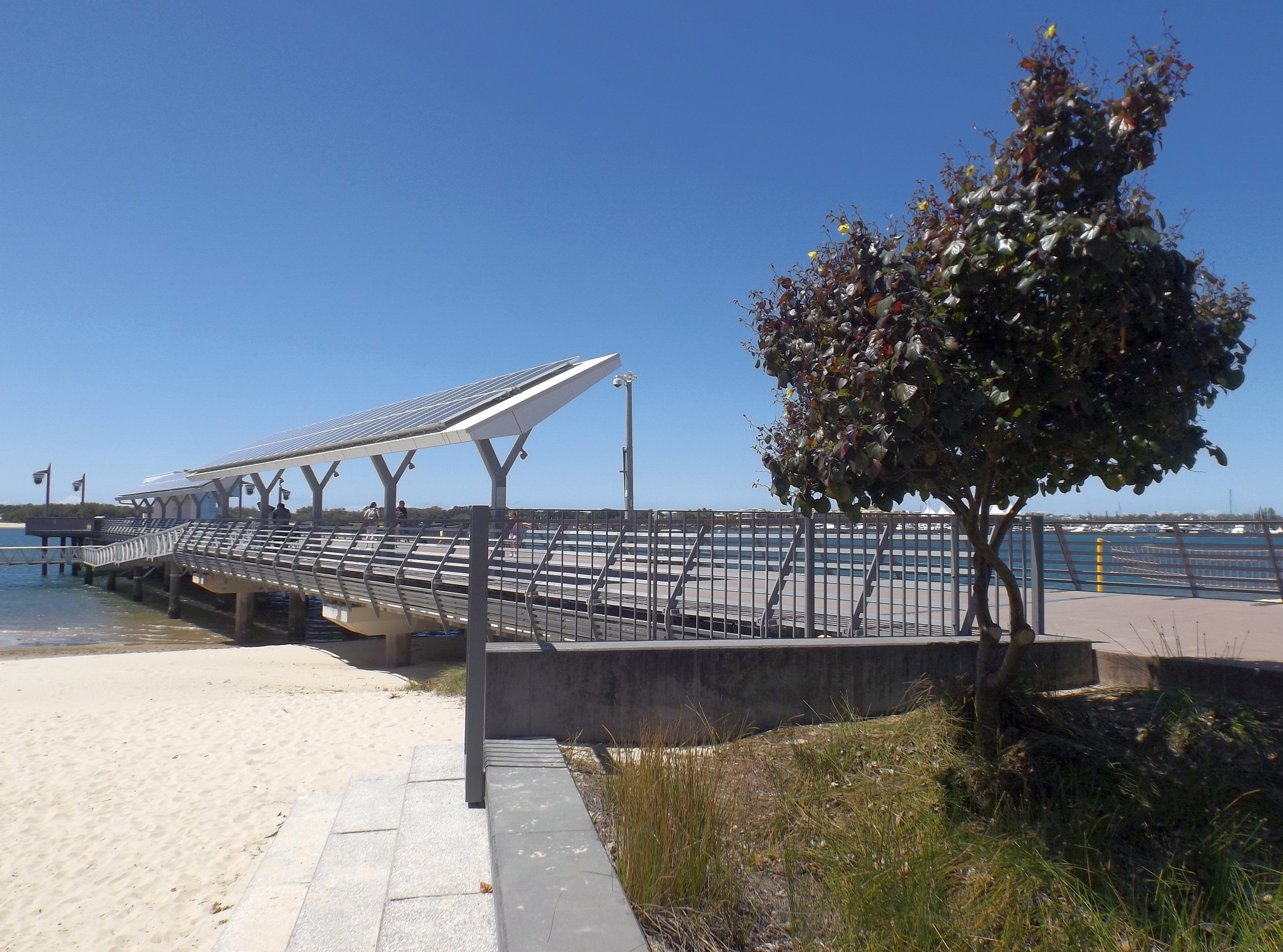
Southport Pier, 2015

The entrance of the Nerang River was at Main Beach in the late 19th century but by the 1980s had moved about 6 kilometres (3.7 mi) northwards. The Seaway was completed in 1986 to stabilise the location of the Nerang River Entrance. Its construction has allowed greater tidal flows. This has created a larger tidal range within the Broadwater with lower low tides. Towards the northern end of the broadwater the Pimpama River enters. The broadwater is very large and contains lots of species of marine life. Gold Coast Ferries operates a number of services across the waterway. Curlew Island, a popular habitat for bird species including the Far Eastern curlew, emerged from the Broadwater over the last four decades.

The Broadwater has undergone dramatic changes since the 1970s including the construction of an extensive number and network of artificial waterways that account for up to 90% of Australia's canal estates. Positioned in one of the fastest growing regions in the developed world, urbanisation surrounding the Broadwater is expected to continue. The region has important biodiversity values that have led to areas of the Broadwater listed as an international Ramsar site and inclusion to international migratory bird arrangements. The Broadwater provides a vital function in the provision of feeding, spawning and nursery sites for recreationally and commercially important finfish species.

The Broadwater catchment includes a number of watercourses including the Logan/Albert, Coomera, Pimpama and Nerang Rivers. Creeks such as the Loders, Biggera and Behm and Wasp also flow into the estuary.

The most common seagrass species in the body of water is Zostera muelleri which grows in the shallower parts. Halophila ovalis and Halophila spinulosa are also found in the deeper waters of the Broadwater.

== History ==
Captain Patrick Logan was the first European to discover this southern entrance to Moreton Bay. In the early 1880s the first Southport Pier was opened to the public. On 26 November 1925, the Jubilee Bridge opened to pedestrian and vehicular traffic, becoming the first bridge to be erected in the Broadwater area. The bridge provided direct access between Southport and Main Beach and offered an alternative to, and eventually replaced, the ferry services which had transported passengers from the jetty, in the vicinity of later day Barney Street, across the water at the point where the Nerang River meets the Broadwater.

In 1966–1967, the Jubilee Bridge was replaced by the Gold Coast Bridge, colloquially known as the Sundale Bridge due to its proximity to the Sundale Shopping Centre. The two bridges were on different alignments and, for a period of time, both were in place until the demolition of the earlier bridge commenced. The Jubilee Bridge was on an east-west alignment commencing at Queen Street, Southport before ending in the vicinity of the Southport Yacht Club at Main Beach on the southern bank of the Nerang River. The Gold Coast Bridge was on a north-south alignment following the path of the Gold Coast Highway. The Gold Coast Bridge has since been joined by a bridge for light rail on its western side and a pedestrian bridge on its eastern side.

Fisherman's Wharf opened in 1983 was located on the site of the present-day Versace Hotel. A popular and regionally iconic hospitality and entertainment complex (known to locals as Fishos) closied in 1998.

Construction of the Gold Coast Seaway was undertaken between 1984 and 1986. Plans for a cruise ship terminal and resort on Wave Break Island were rejected by the Queensland Government in 2015.

On 2 January 2023 a mid-air collision occurred between two helicopters undertaking tourist trips over the Broadwater. The collision killed four people and injured eight (three critically).

== Broadwaterway ==
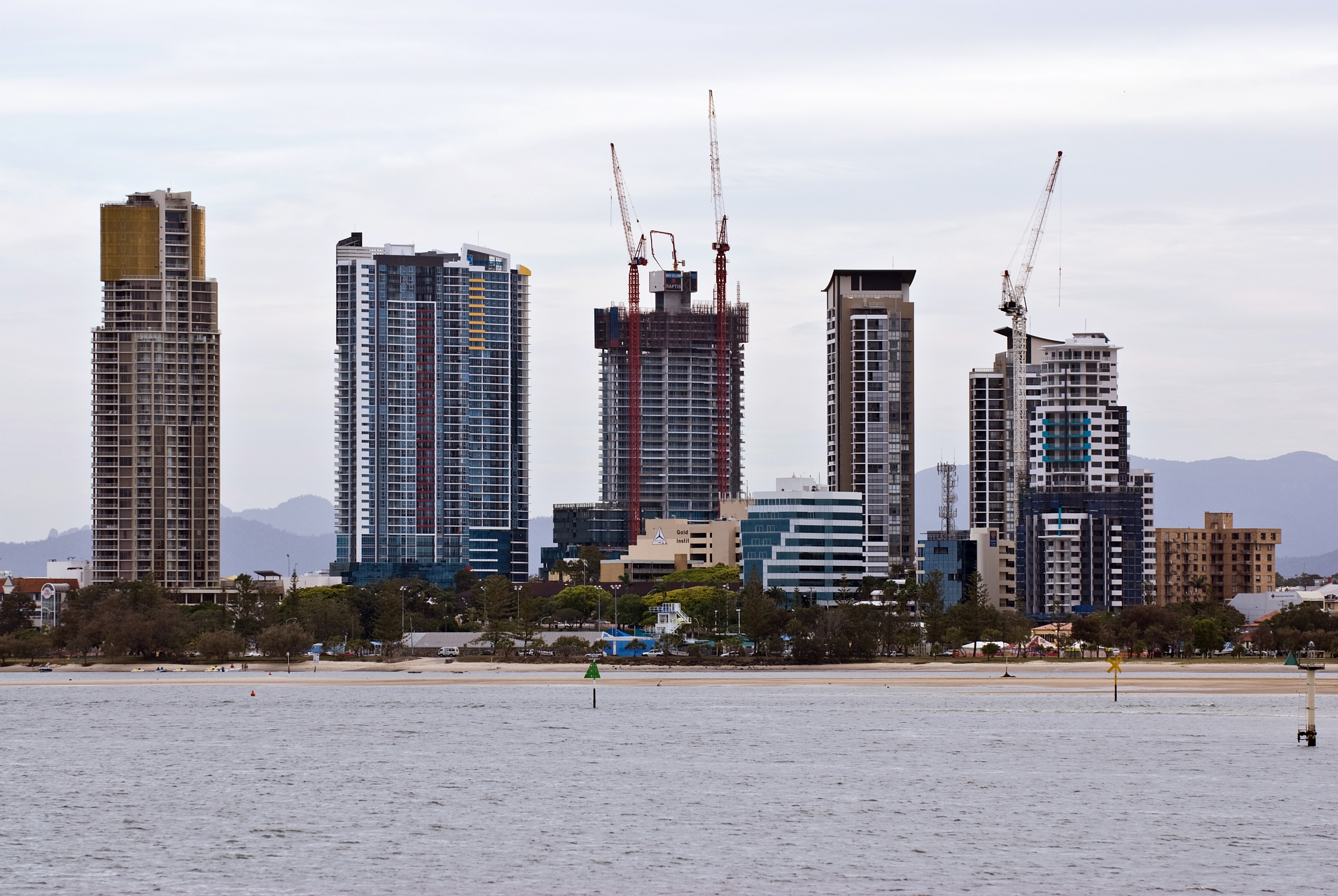
Highrise development in Southport, 2008

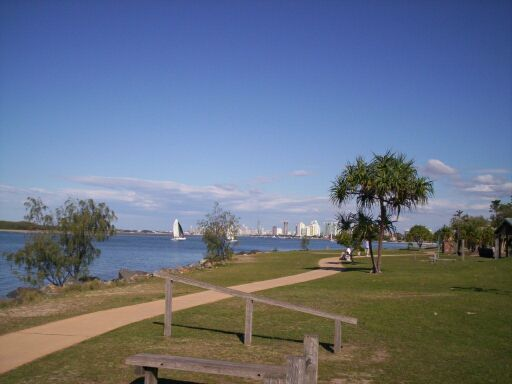
Looking south along the foreshore at Biggera Waters

The Broadwaterway is a 19-kilometre (12 mi) foreshoreway along the foreshores of the Gold Coast Broadwater. The Broadwaterway includes:

- The Spit, a sandy peninsula
- the Marine Stadium
- western Spit foreshores (including Sea World, Fishing fleet, Versace Hotel, Marina Mirage, Versace Hotel, Water Police, Sea Scouts and the Southport Yacht Club)
- Pelican Beach at Main Beach
- Southport Broadwater Parklands
- Marine Parade and Harley Park Labrador
- Broadwater Esplanades of Biggera Waters, Runaway Bay and Hollywell.
- Paradise Point Broadwater Parklands

== See also ==
- List of rivers of Australia § Queensland
- Southern Moreton Bay Islands
- Southern Moreton Bay Islands National Park
- Sports on the Gold Coast, Queensland
