= Loders Creek =

Loders
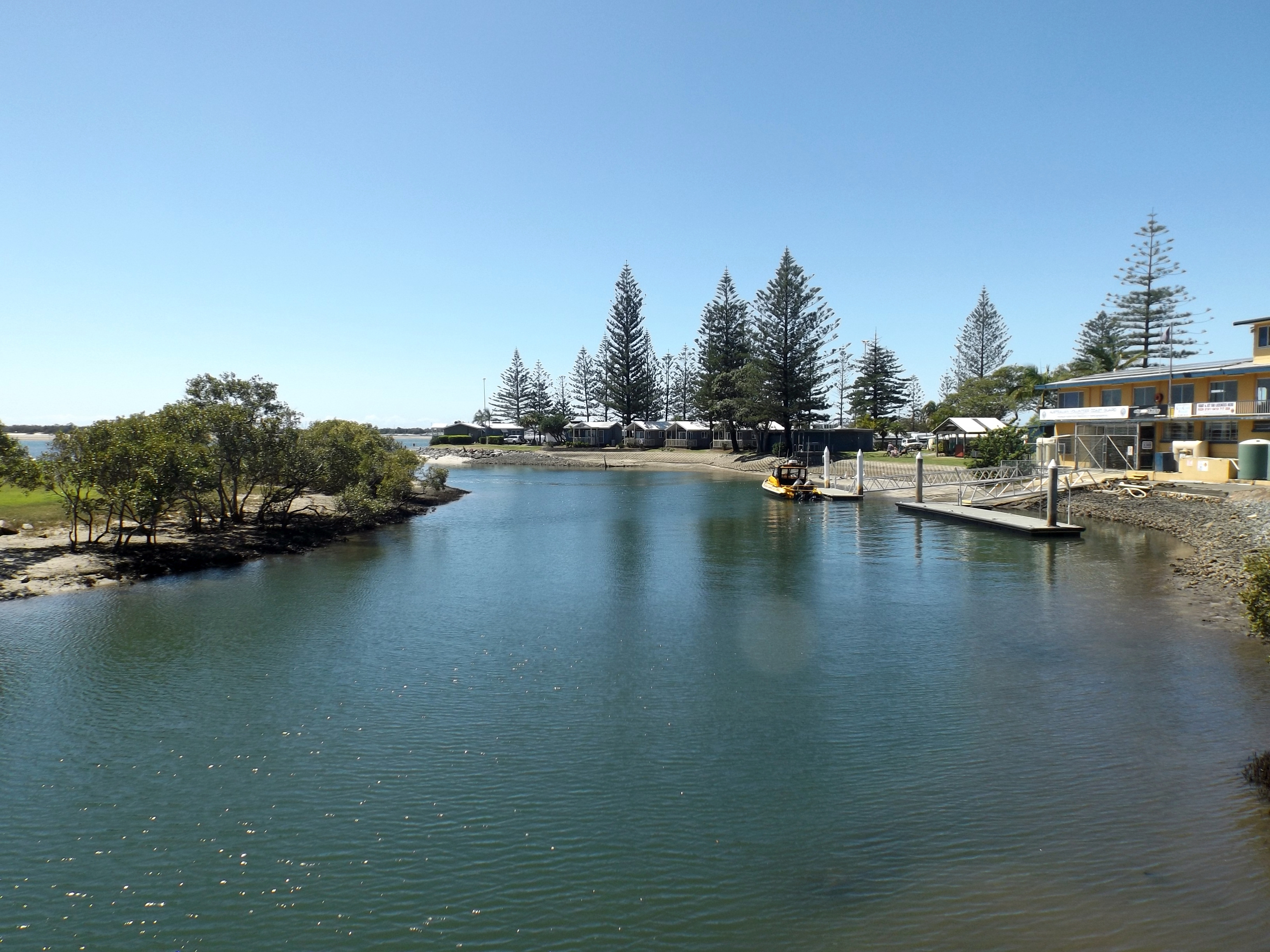
- The Loders Creek mouth, 2015

- Location of the Loders Creek mouth within Queensland

Location
- Country: Australia
- State: Queensland
- Region: South East Queensland

Physical characteristics
- Source
  - location: Ashmore
- Mouth: Gold Coast Broadwater
  - location: Southport
  - coordinates: 27.9549°S 153.4105°E
  - elevation: 0 m (0 ft)
- Length: 8.3 km (5.2 mi)

The Loders Creek is a stream and tidal creek which flows through the suburbs of the Gold Coast of South East Queensland, Australia. The creek is 8.3 kilometres (5.2 miles) long, and forms part of the Gold Coast Broadwater estuary catchment area.

== Course and catchment ==
The creek is formed from two small unnamed streams that converge to the west of Southport. Both of these tributaries have been substantially modified to provide storm water drainage for the suburb of Ashmore, and consist mainly of concrete lined channels. The northern tributary does have some areas of natural channel, with pool-and-riffle channel morphology. These areas provide a significant habitat for the vulnerable wallum froglet.

From the confluence of the two tributaries, the creek flows in a north-easterly direction bordering the Southport State High School, before passing under the Gold Coast Highway to reach the Broadwater at Len Fox Park, between Southport and Labrador.

The drainage basin of the creek lies between that of the Biggera Creek to the north, and that of the Nerang River to the south and west.

== Catchment group ==
The Loders Creek was the first for which a formal community catchment management group was established on the Gold Coast. Since their formation in 1994, the group, which aims to enhance the creek and its environs, has created a nature trail and butterfly garden. They have also produced educational resources about the creek, carried out restoration work, and completed wildlife surveys in the catchment.

== Flora and fauna ==
Although degraded by the removal of native vegetation along its length for flood control, the creek does contain areas of freshwater and tidal wetlands, with some dry eucalyptus forest in the catchment. Wildlife includes native species such as bandicoots, koala, and lace monitor.

== See also ==
- List of rivers of Australia § Queensland
