= Dux Hut =

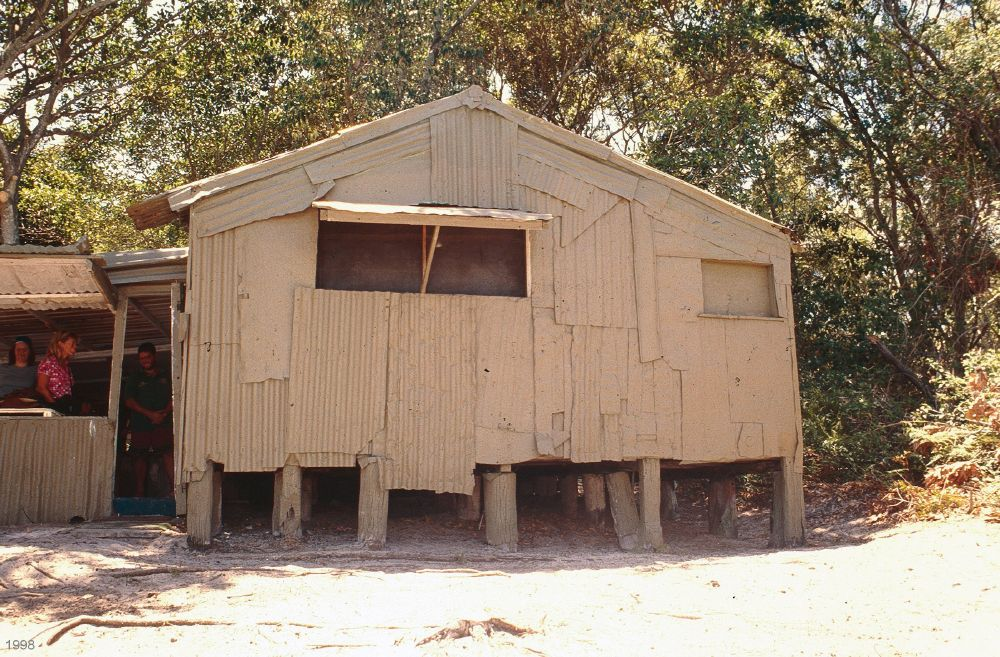
- Dux Hut, 1998

- Location within Queensland Location within Australia
- 27.7968°S 153.4307°E
- Location: Dux Anchorage, South Stradbroke Island, Gold Coast City, Queensland, Australia

History
- Design period: 1919–1930s (interwar period)
- Built: c. 1930–c. 1930

Queensland Heritage Register
- Official name: Dux Hut
- Type: state heritage (built)
- Designated: 6 April 1998
- Reference no.: 602012
- Significant period: 1920s–1930s (fabric)
- Significant components: hut/shack
- Builders: Augie Dux

Dux Hut is a heritage-listed hut at Dux Anchorage, South Stradbroke Island, Gold Coast City, Queensland, Australia. It was built from c. 1930 to c. 1930 by Augie Dux. It was added to the Queensland Heritage Register on 6 April 1998.

== History ==
Dux Hut was erected c. 1930, on Oyster Camp Reserve R.638 on South Stradbroke Island, in conjunction with oysterman Augie Dux's working of the oyster bank directly opposite, in Tipplers Passage.

Oyster cultivation in Moreton Bay has been regulated since 1863, and exploitation of the Bay's oyster banks as a food source by the indigenous population dates many thousands of years. In the mid-1820s, British convicts employed in establishing a penal settlement at Moreton Bay collected and burned oyster shells to produce lime, and during the first two decades after the opening of the district to free settlement in 1842, oyster shells (often including the live oysters) were collected by the schooner-load for the same purpose. This exploitative practice was prohibited under the Queensland colonial government's Oyster Act of 1863, which introduced a licensing system for oyster cultivation. The Oyster Act of 1874 implemented further controls: a system of annual licenses regulated the collection and cultivation of bank oysters (oysters found or cultivated between high-water mark and two feet below the level of low-water mark), and seven-year leases were made available for dredge oyster sections within the Bay. Dredge oysters were identified as those found below the level of two feet below low-water mark. These leases were offered at public auction, and attracted high prices during the late 19th century.

By 1886, oyster fisheries in Moreton Bay extended for nearly 100 miles (160 km), from Southport to Caloundra. 178 oyster banks, comprising over 5,000 acres (2,000 ha), were being worked, and 40 dredge sections were available for lease. Moreton Bay and Sandy Straits were considered the great nurseries and breeding-grounds for oysters on the eastern seaboard of the Australian Continent, with an estimated 40,000 oyster cultivation bags in Moreton Bay, and scope for many times this number. The principal export market for Moreton Bay oysters was Melbourne, but periodic glutting of that market by New Zealand oysters was problematic for the Queensland industry. The industry was plagued also by operators who denuded oyster banks, and made little or no effort at replenishing the stock.

The Oyster Act of 1886 was introduced to encourage sustainable oyster culture (the cultivation of oysters and the taking of oysters for sale). The Act offered transferable, 14 year leases over identified oyster grounds which could comprise both an oyster dredge section and oyster banks. Licenses were still available for working oyster banks not within a dredge section. A penalty for selling undersized oysters was introduced, and lessees and licensees were required to register a brand, which had to appear on all oyster bags. Importantly, lessees had to reserve some cultivation on each bank, and to constantly renew the oyster stock.

To encourage the oyster industry further, and to regulate the practice of oystermen "squatting" on Crown land, the Queensland government in 1889 proclaimed 26 oyster camp reserves, varying from 5 to 40 acres (2.0 to 16.2 ha), in Moreton Bay and Sandy Straits. On these reserves, licensed oystermen were permitted to camp, build houses, fence in small allotments, and carry out activities associated with oyster farming. Further oyster camp reserves were proclaimed in the 1890s and early 20th century, as the need arose. Oyster Camp Reserve R.638, a five-acre reserve at Jurim, south of Tippler's Landing, was gazetted in 1896 under the provisions of the Crown Lands Act of 1884, following application by the Inspector of Oyster Fisheries that a camping ground for oyster bank licensees was required urgently near Swan Bay.

The largest leaseholder of oyster dredge sections and oyster banks in Moreton Bay from the late 1870s to the 1920s was The Moreton Bay Oyster Company, established in 1876. The Company operated leaseholds near Stradbroke and Bribie Islands and at Hervey Bay, employing a small community of workers. In the southern Bay a camp was established on the mainland at Coombabah, north of Southport. In 1881 the Company took over the lease of Currigee run on South Stradbroke Island, and a small settlement of oystermen and their families was established there as well.

Oyster cultivation in Moreton Bay peaked in the period 1880–1910. The breaking through of the ocean at Jumpinpin in May 1898, separating Stradbroke Island into North Stradbroke Island and South Stradbroke Island, decimated the oyster banks of southern Moreton Bay; this, combined with mud worm infestations, competition in the market place from New Zealand oysters, increased labour costs, and over exploitation of the oyster banks, culminated in the industry declining after 1910. However, The Moreton Bay Oyster Company continued its operations until 1965, and after the company was wound down, a number of its oyster leaseholds were taken up by previous employees. By the mid-1980s, there were no longer any dredge oyster sections in Moreton Bay, and Queensland wide, oyster production had fallen to 10% of peak period (1880–1910) output. Labour-intensive oyster cultivation is now rare in Queensland, and most oyster bank licensees harvest naturally occurring oysters.

Dux Hut on South Stradbroke Island was erected c. 1930 on Oyster Camp Reserve R.638, opposite Oyster Bank 122 in Tippler's Passage, by Augie Dux of Labrador, who had taken up the licence of this oyster bank in 1928, under the provisions of The Fish and Oyster Act of 1914. From early maps, this bank appears to coincide with Oyster Bank 122 worked from at least 1884 by Henry Tippler, a pioneer of oyster farming in southern Moreton Bay. Tipplers Island and Tipplers Passage are both named after Henry Tippler.

Freidrich Carl August (Augie) Dux, born in 1878, was the son of German immigrants who settled at Nundah in the early 1870s. In the 1880s the family moved to Caboolture, where Augie's father, Johann Dux, took up fishing, crabbing and oyster culling at Pumistone Passage and Bribie Island. Dux Street and Dux Creek at Caboolture were named after this family. As a youth, Augie worked with his father on the oyster banks, and in the early 1900s, moved to southern Moreton Bay where he worked as an oysterman, eventually gaining employment with the Moreton Bay Oyster Company based at Currigee. He married Lillian O'Connell of Currigee in 1905, and c. 1910 the family moved to Southport.

Augie Dux later took up several oyster bank licenses in southern Moreton Bay, including Oyster Bank 122 in Tippler's Passage (1928). His sons helped him to develop the oyster banks, obtaining timber and shell bedding from Crusoe and Rat islands nearby. On Oyster Camp Reserve R.638, directly opposite Oyster Bank 122, Augie Dux and his son Stanley erected a one-roomed hut, for use when working their oyster lease in Tippler's Passage. It is understood they re-used timbers initially cut by Augie in 1918, when the family moved to Broad Street, Labrador, where they erected a house of saplings and bark, with a hardwood floor. About 1929 this house was demolished and replaced with a new house of milled-timber, the timbers of the 1918 building being re-cycled in the hut on South Stradbroke Island. The stumps of this hut are understood to be of Bloodwood, the framing of Ti-tree saplings, and the floor and some of the wall linings of hardwood, all of which was cut by Augie Dux and his sons in the Labrador area. Oyster farming at this period was still highly labour-intensive, and poaching was a continual problem. Stanley Dux recalls spending from Monday to Saturday each week at the hut, working and guarding the oyster bank.

About the same time as the hut was erected, the Dux family also constructed a jetty of cypress pine, immediately in front of the hut. This jetty survived for many decades, but now only a few stumps remain in the foreshore to indicate the location.

The Dux family retained the license to Oyster Bank 122 until August 1957. They were well known in southern Moreton Bay - the reserve in front of their Labrador home was named Dux Oval, and the foreshore in front of their South Stradbroke Island hut became known as Dux Anchorage. Since their time, the hut has been extended with a skillion-roofed kitchen, the window openings have been changed, the corrugated iron sheeting has been replaced, and a number of introduced shade trees have been planted.

Subsequent licensees of Oyster Bank 122 used the hut in association with working the oyster bank until two new sheds were erected about 50 metres (160 ft) to the south, in the 1980s. From the early 1970s, Dux Hut has been used also as a recreational venue - and exclusively so since the 1980s. In 1995, R.638 was repealed, and Dux Hut currently (February 1998) sits on Unallocated State Land.

== Description ==
Dux Hut is located on the western shore of South Stradbroke Island, facing Tippler's Passage in Moreton Bay. It sits above the high water mark and is surrounded by primarily native vegetation on the inland side, some of which has been cleared in the immediate vicinity of the hut, and by mangrove flats, on the bay side. A mature rubber tree in front of the hut, and several other mature, introduced trees close-by, provide shade.

Two recent structures associated with a working oyster bank are located on the southern side of the hut, but are obscured from view by the surrounding vegetation. Timber piles from a jetty are evident in the water in front of the hut, and an oyster bank is located in the bay, slightly to the south of the hut.

There are two distinct sections to the hut; the original gable-roofed section which is elevated on timber stumps, and a skillion-roofed extension which was constructed on the northern side of the original structure after 1957. This section sits at a lower level.

The original section consists of a single room. It has a post and sapling unlined frame, held together in a variety of methods, including wire and string ties, nails and rudimentary mortice and tenon joints. Some of the ties are of nylon string and appear to have been added at a later stage.

The frame is clad externally with disparate pieces of corrugated iron. The framework internally suggests that there were previously window openings. However, these are now covered with corrugated iron. A window in the western side is thought to have been added at a later date and comprises a corrugated iron flap which is hinged along the top and opens outwards, supported by a timber prop.

The gable roof is also clad in corrugated iron and the floor is of timber boards, overlaid with variously patterned linoleum pieces. The room is furnished with a number of single beds.

On the northern side of the original section is an annexe. This is at a lower level than the original section and has a skillion roof. The construction technique is similar to that of the original section, with an unlined timber frame externally clad in corrugated iron. However, the frame is constructed of machined timber members and the corrugated iron is in sheets rather than small pieces. Large openings, of similar design to the window in the original section, are located in each side of the annexe and doors are located in the western and northern sides. At the front of this area is a sink and benchtop, and the remainder of the space is divided by a minimal amount of furniture.

== Heritage listing ==
Dux Hut was listed on the Queensland Heritage Register on 6 April 1998 having satisfied the following criteria.

The place is important in demonstrating the evolution or pattern of Queensland's history.

Dux Hut on South Stradbroke Island, erected c. 1930 in association with the working of Oyster Bank 122 in Tippler's Passage, is important in illustrating aspects of the early-established and important oyster industry in Moreton Bay. In particular, it demonstrates the important relationship of the oyster reserves established by the Queensland government in the late 19th and early 20th centuries, to the working of oyster banks and oyster dredge sections. Significantly, the hut remains in situ, on the shoreline, opposite a working oyster bank taken up by at least 1884.

The place demonstrates rare, uncommon or endangered aspects of Queensland's cultural heritage.

Local knowledge suggests that Dux Hut is one of only a few oystermen's huts remaining in southern Moreton Bay.

The place is important in demonstrating the principal characteristics of a particular class of cultural places.

It has been well maintained, and despite some changes, still demonstrates the principal characteristics of an oysterman's improvised 'camp': small scale, simplicity of design, use of re-cycled materials, and lack of amenities. With the addition of a skillion-roofed kitchen extension, changed window openings, and introduced shade trees, the place also demonstrates the principal characteristics of a squatter's beach-side recreational hut.

The place is important because of its aesthetic significance.

Dux Hut is of aesthetic significance, largely due to its bayside setting. The rustic and rudimentary construction techniques also contribute to its aesthetic qualities and assist in the integration of the hut in the landscape.
