= Ephraim Island =

Coordinates: 27°53′08.47″S 153°23′25.26″E

- Interactive map of Ephraim Island

Geography
- Location: Gold Coast Broadwater
- Area: 9.6 ha (24 acres)

Administration
- Australia
- State: Queensland
- Local Government Area: City of Gold Coast

Ephraim Island is luxury residential development located in the suburb of Paradise Point in the north of Gold Coast, Australia. The development is a joint-venture between Lewis Land and Mirvac. The island has an area of 9.6 hectares and was once covered by mangroves. The development is distinctive for inhabiting an artificial island in the Broadwater, connecting to the mainland by a 400-metre bridge.

The island, its landmass sculpted into a conspicuous albeit backwards "e" from an aerial view, is divided into two sections. The southern division, the 'tail' of the "e", is covered mostly by undeveloped salt mud-lands. The design provides water frontage to every apartment. The northern 'eye' of the island has been developed to include a marina, 12 larger buildings (the largest topping 11 stories), a restaurant and up to 30 separate beach houses open to the Broadwater. The marina has a capacity of 115 berths.

The island was cleared for development long before any construction began. According to locals, the area was devoid of vegetation from as far back as 1992 due to legal confrontations with concerned members of the community. In 2003, the developers (acknowledged as Mirvac and Lewisland) were given a green light by the Gold Coast City Council and started construction. The site was once the largest residential construction project in Queensland. 20% of the island has had its natural habitat preserved.

The project is complete as of mid-2008.

Some scenes for the feature film Jucy (2010) were shot on the island.

== See also ==
- List of islands of Australia
