= Jumpinpin Channel =

Tidal deep water channel in Queensland, Australia

Coordinates: 27.733°S 153.442°E

The Jumpinpin channel, also known as The Pin, is a fast moving tidal deep water channel in Queensland, Australia. It was formed in 1898 and severed Stradbroke Island, originally one island, into North Stradbroke Island and South Stradbroke Island. Its name is derived from a Yugambeh word meaning Pandanus root.

== Formation ==
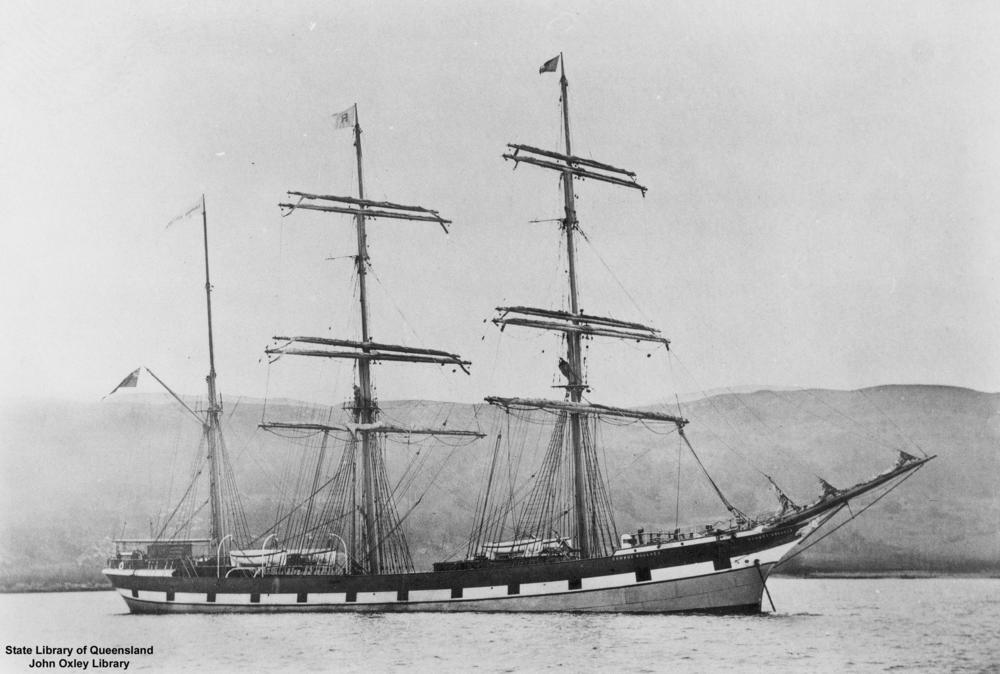
The Cambus Wallace.

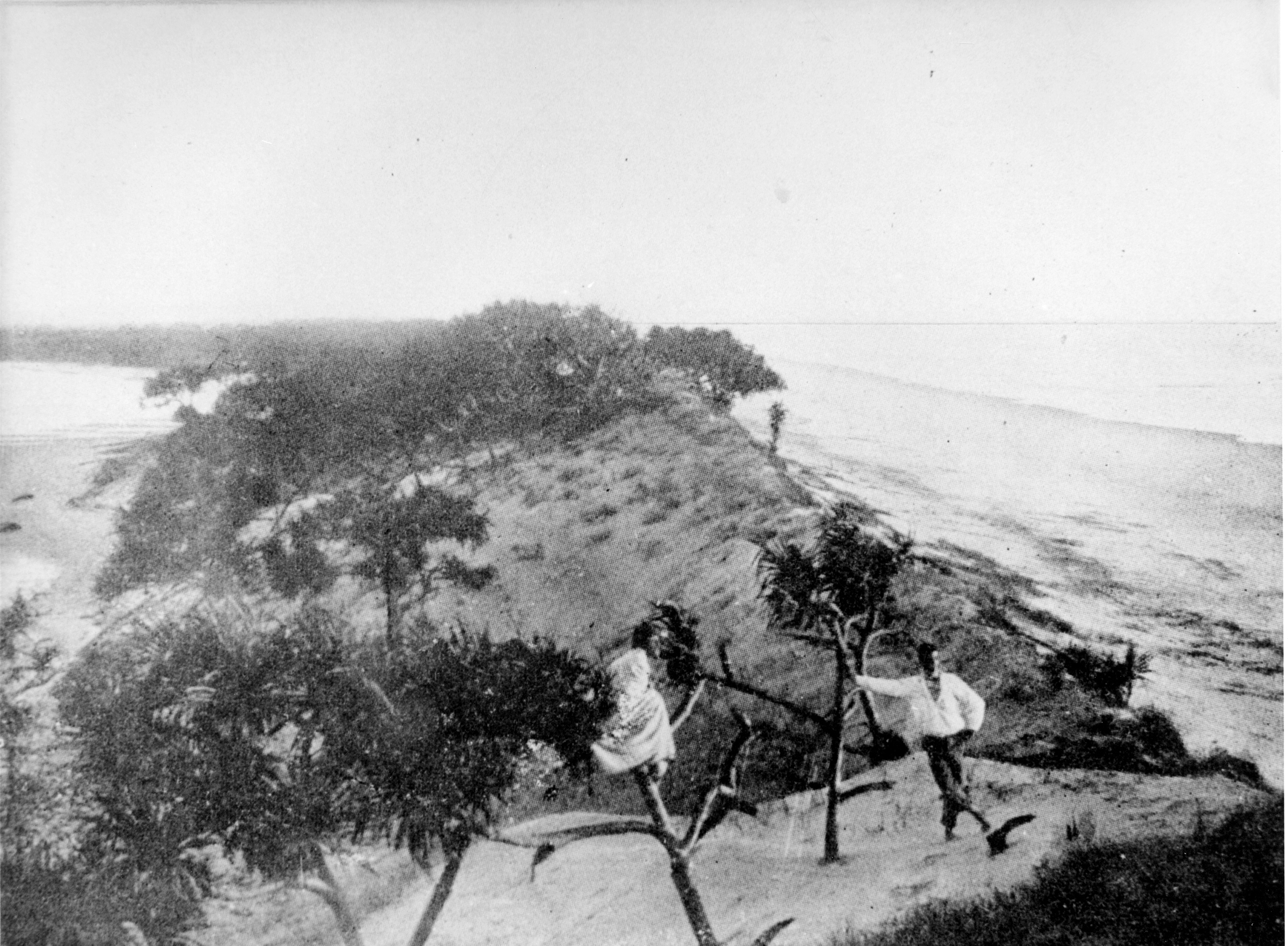
Jumpinpin, the narrow stretch of land on Stradbroke Island, circa 1890 before the seas broke through to create Jumpinpin Channel

A channel in the general area of Jumpinpin may have formed and silted up several times over recent millennia. However, the most recent formation of the channel is generally blamed on two events. The first of these was the wreck of the Cambus Wallace, a 75 m steel barque of 1534 tonnes built in 1894 at Port Glasgow. In the early morning of 3 September 1894, the Cambus Wallace ran aground in heavy seas near what was then a narrow stretch of Stradbroke Island called Tuleen. Most of the crew managed to swim to shore, but six men drowned and were buried on the beach. The ship broke up where she struck and most of the cargo was washed ashore and plundered by local residents. During the subsequent cleanup, explosives from the cargo were piled up and deliberately detonated on the beach, leaving large craters. The explosion is credited with severely damaging the beach and weakening the loosely vegetated sand dunes.

Following gradual erosion of the seaward side of the island over the next two years, the second event to ultimately generate the channel at Jumpinpin was the arrival of a cyclone in 1896. Thomas Welsby, writing in 1921, noted, "Within two years (1896) the southeast gales threw again their power and fury on the very spot whereat the Cambus Wallace had come to grief, drove the rollers and breakers against the sandy hillside until it conquered and made passage into Swan Bay." Welsby contradicts himself stating that "The break at Jumpinpin occurred in May, 1898, the first official reporting being under date 13 May, coming from Mr Andrew Graham, Government official, Southport".

TC Luita passed east of Brisbane 6–7 March 1898, producing gales and very high seas along the South Coast.

Newspaper reports indicate that the passage was established in 1898. A sizeable breakthrough had taken place by that year. "News has now been received that the action of the recent gales on the coast, coupled with the abnormally high tides, about Sunday and Monday, May 8 and 9, has effected a clean breach through the island, and there is now a deep channel about half a mile wide at Jumping Pin."

Changes to tidal inundation in the area around the mouth of the Logan River were dramatic. Erosion occurred on farm land and some farmers resorted to building canals. The oyster industry in the area was also affected by what was claimed to be changes in the water density interfering with the ability of the oysters to settle on the seafloor.

== Fishing ==
The Jumpinpin Channel is renowned for fishing for bait and predators such as mulloway jewfish, flathead, sharks, giant trevally, tailor and bream.

== See also ==
- Gold Coast Seaway
- Moreton Bay
