= South Stradbroke Island =

Native name: Minjerribah Nickname: South Straddie
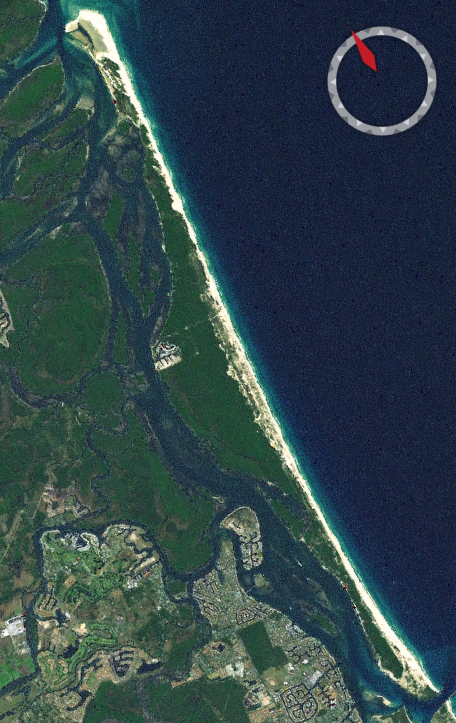
- NASA Landsat Image of South Stradbroke

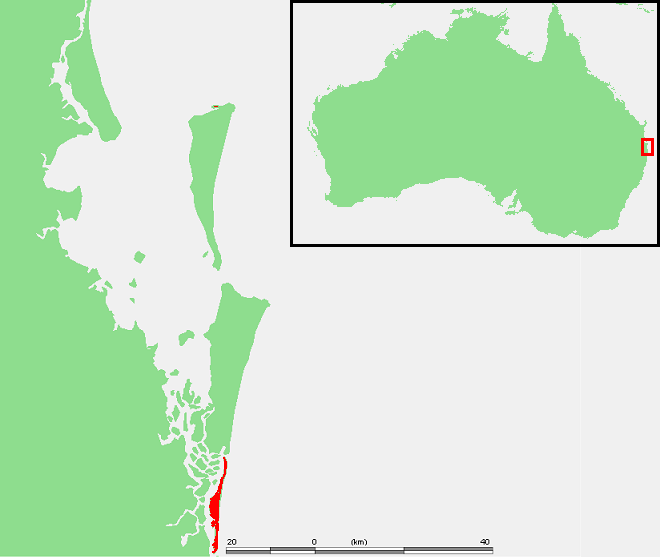

Geography
- Location: Moreton Bay
- Coordinates: 27.8333°S 153.4222°E
- Length: 21 km (13 mi)
- Width: 2.5 km (1.55 mi)

Administration
- Australia
- State: Queensland
- Region: Gold Coast, South East Queensland
- Local government area: City of Gold Coast

Demographics
- Population: 142 (2021 census)

South Stradbroke Island
- Suburb
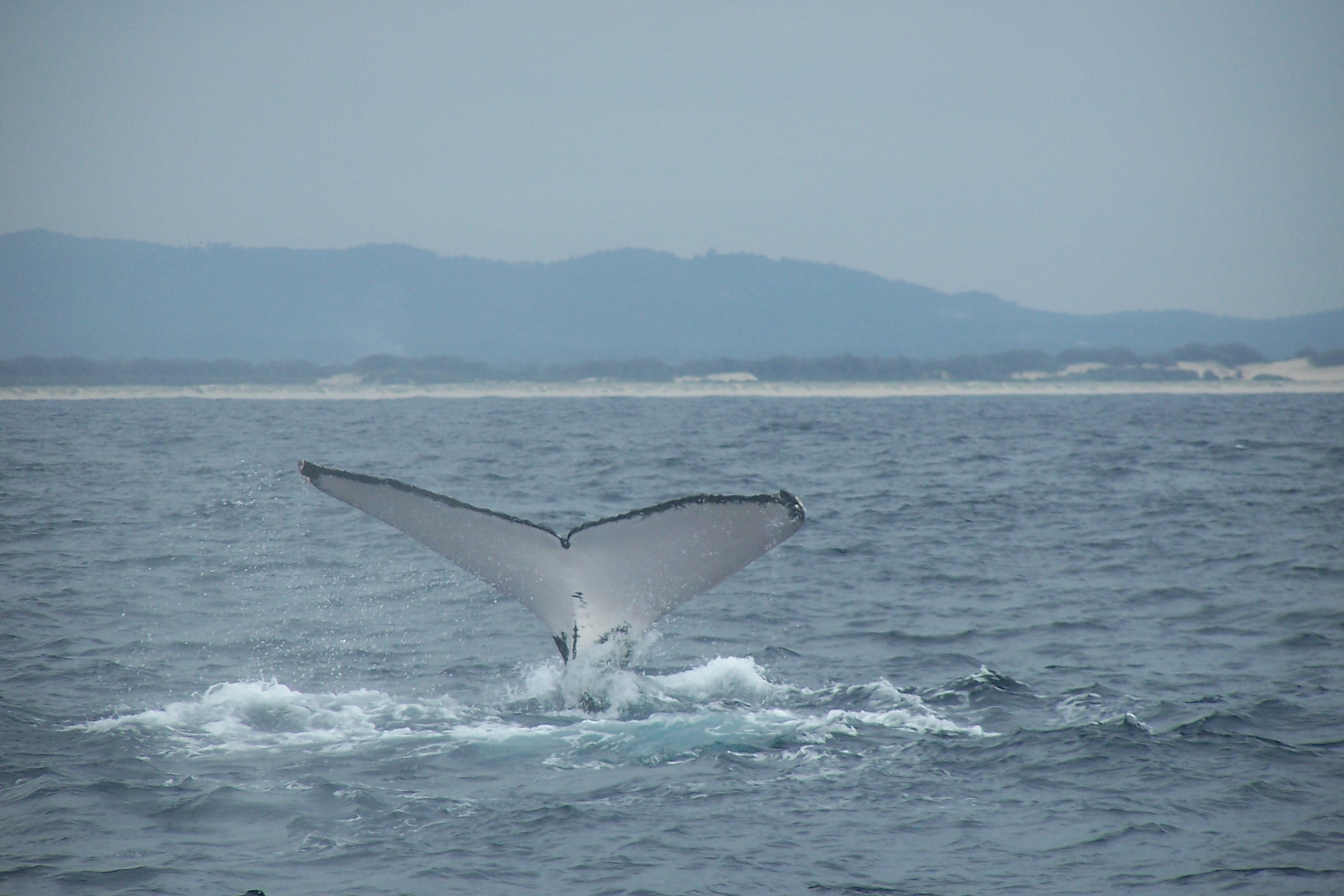
- A humpback whale heading north for the winter, off the coast of South Stradbroke Island
- Interactive map of South Stradbroke Island
- Country: Australia
- State: Queensland
- LGA: City of Gold Coast

Government
  - State electorate: Broadwater
  - Federal division: Fadden

Area
  - Total: 31.3 km^{2} (12.1 sq mi)

Population
  - Total: 142 (2021 census)
  - Density: 4.537/km^{2} (11.75/sq mi)
- Time zone: UTC+10:00 (AEST)
- Postcode: 4216
Suburbs around South Stradbroke Island
| Southern Moreton Bay Islands | North Stradbroke Island | Coral Sea |
| Southern Moreton Bay Islands | South Stradbroke Island | Coral Sea |
| Paradise Point; Hollywell; Runaway Bay | Biggera Waters; Main Beach | Coral Sea |

South Stradbroke Island (Indigenous: Minjerribah), colloquially South Straddie, is an island that lies within Moreton Bay south-southeast of Brisbane in the Australian state of Queensland and forms the northern end of the city of Gold Coast. The island is a locality within the City of Gold Coast. In the 2021 census, South Stradbroke Island had a population of 142 people.

The 21-kilometre (13 mi) by 2.5-kilometre (1.6 mi) sized island, approximately 31.3 square kilometres (12.1 sq mi) in area, is the smaller of the two Stradbroke Islands and lies very close to the mainland. The island has hundreds of wild wallabies that are usually inured to the presence of humans. They are well known for stealing bread from tents and cabins, and joining campers at their fires.

== Geography and environment ==
One of more than 360 islands within Moreton Bay, the central and southern west coast of South Stradbroke Island fronts the Broadwater, and the southern tip marks the Gold Coast Seaway, only a matter of metres from the mainland at Southport Spit. Tipplers Passage separates the northern west coast of the island from several smaller islands within the bay closer to the mainland. The east coast borders the Coral Sea.

South Stradbroke Island consists mainly of sand dunes, remnant livistona rainforest and melaleuca wetlands. The island also has unique flora and fauna. The golden wallaby is endemic to the island and the agile wallaby, once common in southeastern Queensland, has now retreated to the island.

== History ==
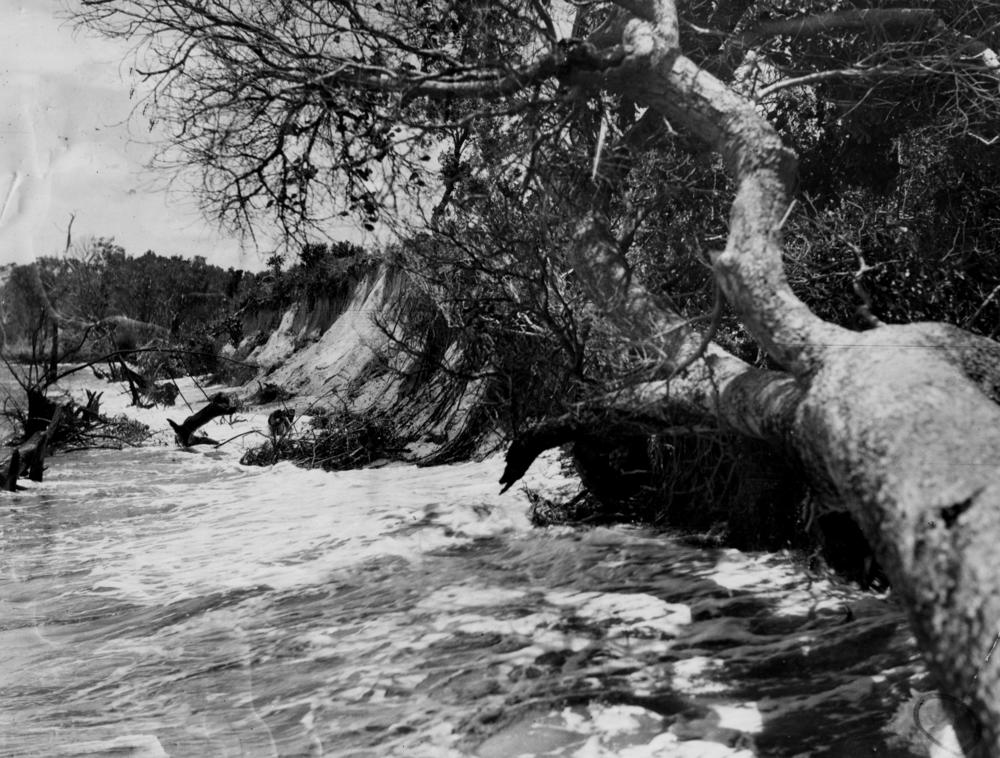
Beach erosion, 1937

Even before its formation as a separate island in 1896 the lands and waters of what is now South Stradbroke were sacred to the Quandamooka people who had long inhabited Redland Bay islands, in particular the Goenpul clan.

To the north the island is separated from the larger North Stradbroke Island by a short and narrow channel. The two islands were originally one, Stradbroke Island. In September 1894, heavy seas drove the barque Cambus Wallace aground on Stradbroke Island at a narrow isthmus known as Tuleen or Jumping Pin, approximately in the middle of the island. Salvage activity (including the detonation of a cargo of explosives) weakened the sand dunes along the isthmus, such that by the autumn of 1898, storms and tides had created a permanent opening from Moreton Bay to the Coral Sea, now known as Jumpinpin Channel. The new tidal channel caused large changes to the channels and islands within southern Moreton Bay. Coastal managers are concerned that eventually one day Jumpinpin may repair itself which may cause problems for tidal waterway management including fish stocks, the habitat of a population of dugongs, sand erosion and flooding.

Currigee, on the west side of South Stradbroke island, was the site of an Aboriginal settlement right up to the middle of the twentieth century. The Levinge family of Indigenous descent were the main residents of this community during the 1930s.

Some land clearing for cattle grazing was conducted in the early 20th century. During the 1950s–1960s sand mining was conducted at the northern ocean beach area but reserves were limited. From the 1870s onwards the island's inner shores were used as camp grounds for holders of oystering licences. A small township called Moondarewa, with 156 surveyed lots, was established at the island's southern tip. By 1953 the island's natural movement north had washed away most of the settlement. Also once located at the southern end was a small area of vine scrub rainforest that attracted significant bird-life.

In 2009, some filming was done on the island for the film The Chronicles of Narnia: The Voyage of the Dawn Treader, released in 2011.

On 17 April 2023 utility services to the community of Couran Cove were turned off amid a legal dispute. Hundreds of homes were without power, water, and gas.

== Demographics ==
The number of people on the island swells significantly during the holiday season. A small number of retirees live permanently on the island sourcing food via boat from Runaway Bay Shopping Centre.

In the 2011 census, South Stradbroke Island had a population of 101 people.

In the 2016 census, South Stradbroke Island had a population of 41 people.

In the 2021 census, South Stradbroke Island had a population of 142 people.

== Heritage listings ==
South Stradbroke Island has a number of heritage-listed sites, including:

- Lot 50WD3686: Grave of Ben Frances Manager
- Dux Anchorage (27.7968°S 153.4307°E): Dux Hut.
- Canaipa Passage, Jumpinpin: Site of the wreck of the Cambus Wallace
- 4 Island Street, Currigee: The Graves

== Accommodation facilities ==
The island is a tourist destination. There are numerous campsites including an anchorage for the Southport Yacht Club and Dux Campsite, owned by The Southport School. Tipplers, another site, was purchased by the Gold Coast City Council in 2009 and accommodates up to 100 tents with gas barbecues, a children's play area, and a kiosk that has basic camping supplies including ice and firewood. The Council has two other campgrounds: North and South Currigee, that together accommodate up to 80 tents with similar facilities to Tipplers. Due to ongoing encroachment by sand dunes, the Council-run Bedrooms Campsite was closed in 2013.

Couran Cove Island Resort is located on the north side of South Stradbroke Island Resort. Located approximately forty minutes by boat from Surfers Paradise, Couran Cove Island Resort provides a range of accommodation options, dining and the opportunity to see native Australian animals in the forest. The resort was established by Ron Clarke and originally opened in 1998 as an eco-tourism destination. While the resort is not marketed as such now, it does incorporate a number of environmental design features and technologies. There are also several private houses located at the southern end of the island.

In May 2023, there were many reports from remaining South Stradbroke Island residents that the resort closed after Easter 2023, with no defined reopening date, while the associated entities sought to resolve long-running legal disputes. Many local media reports indicated that the number of remaining permanent inhabitants on the island had dwindled, and as a result of disputes some of the island residents had access to water, electricity and gas cut off.

== Recreation ==
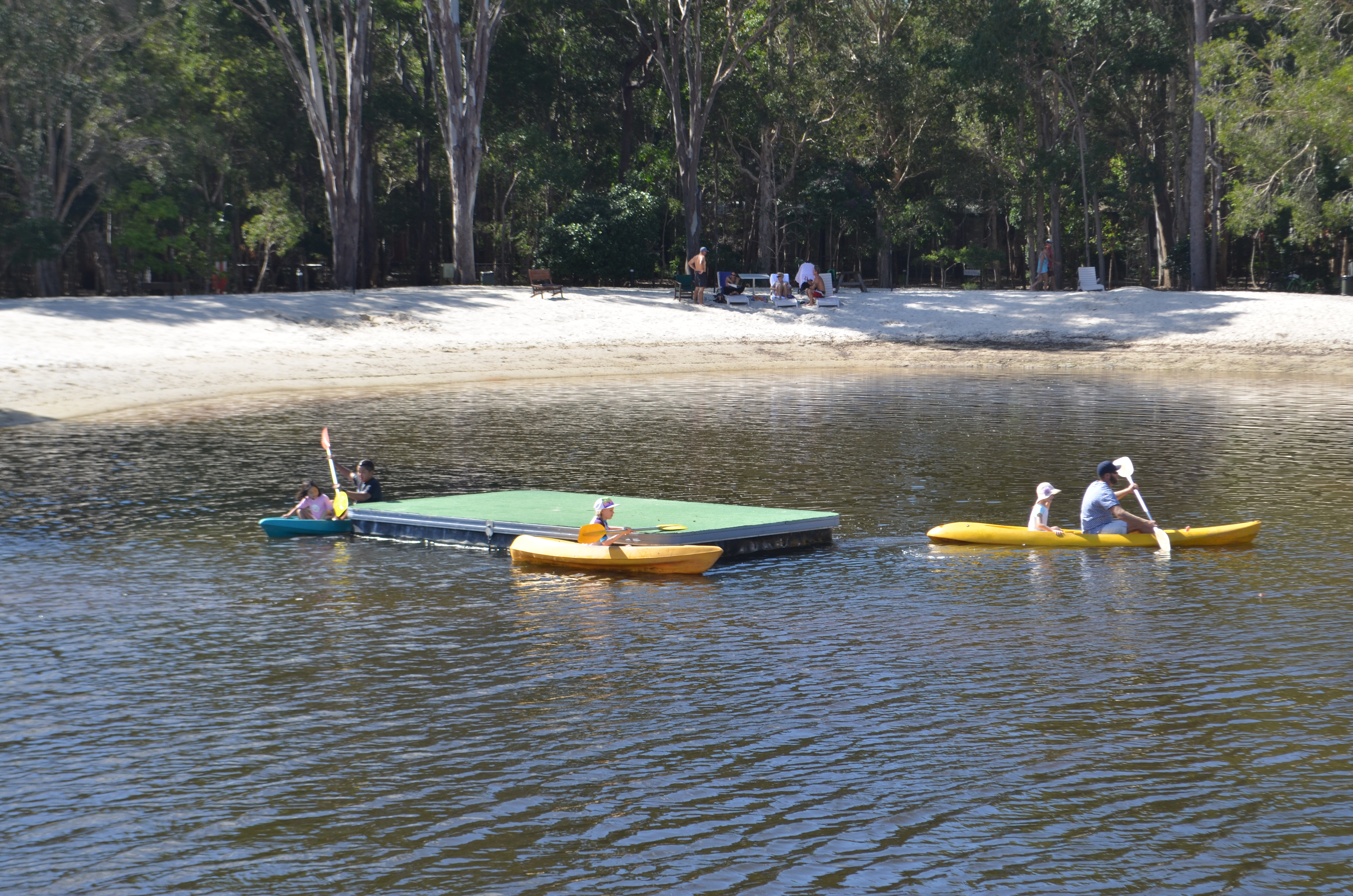
Couran Cove, 2001

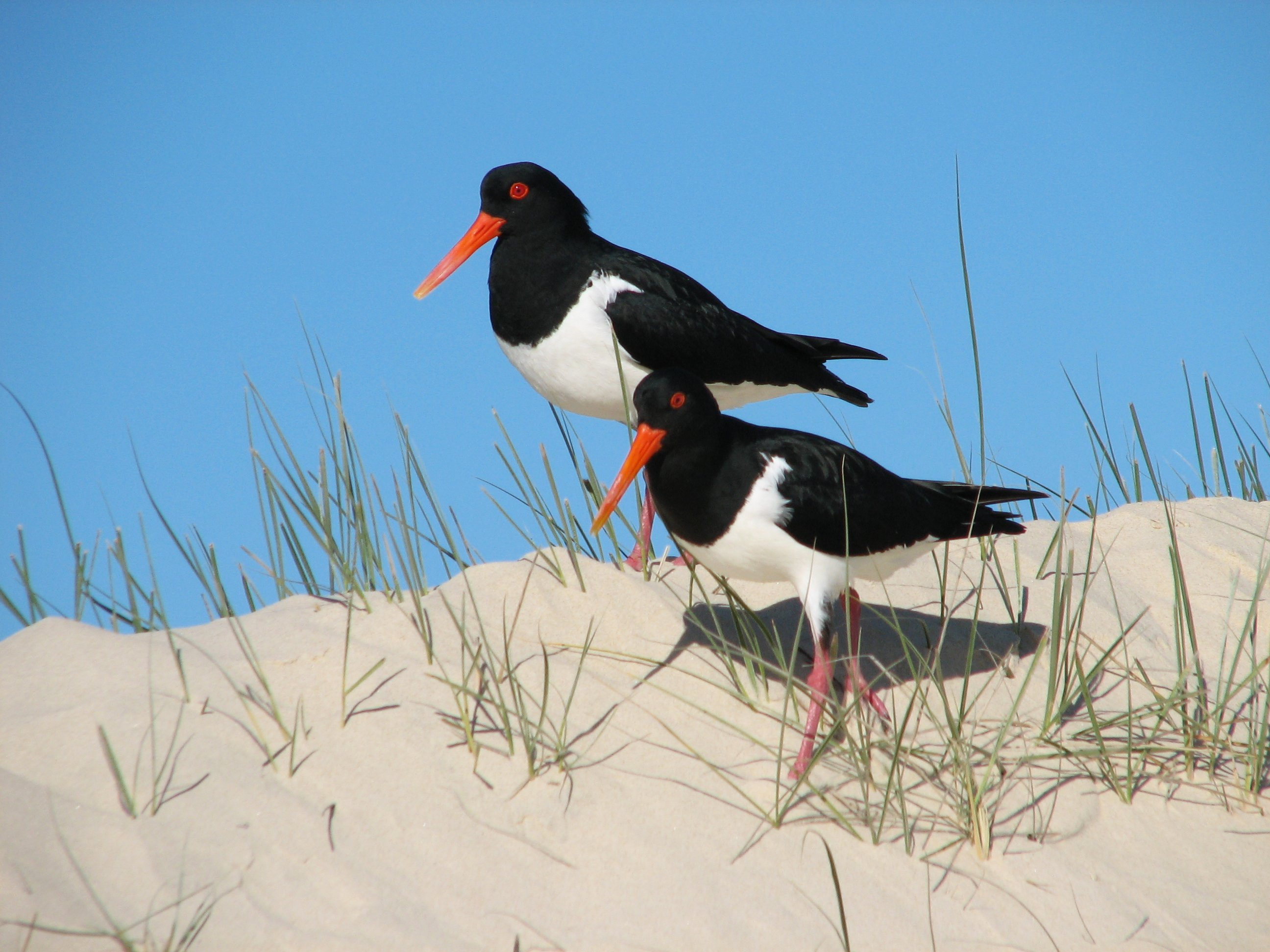
Birds on a sand dune, 2006

An 1,800-hectare (4,400-acre) conservation park provides access to native wildlife. The park is suitable for hiking and ocean fishing.

Other recreational activities include jet ski tours, tube rides, 4WD tours, and speed boat rides. These operate from the Couran Cove Island Resort and Tipplers Passage.

== Education ==
There are no schools on the island, but there are many schools on the mainland. However, accessing those schools would depend on the transport options available from the home location on the island. Distance education would be another option.

== See also ==
- List of islands of Queensland
