= Southern Moreton Bay Islands National Park =

National park in Australia

- IUCN category II (national park)
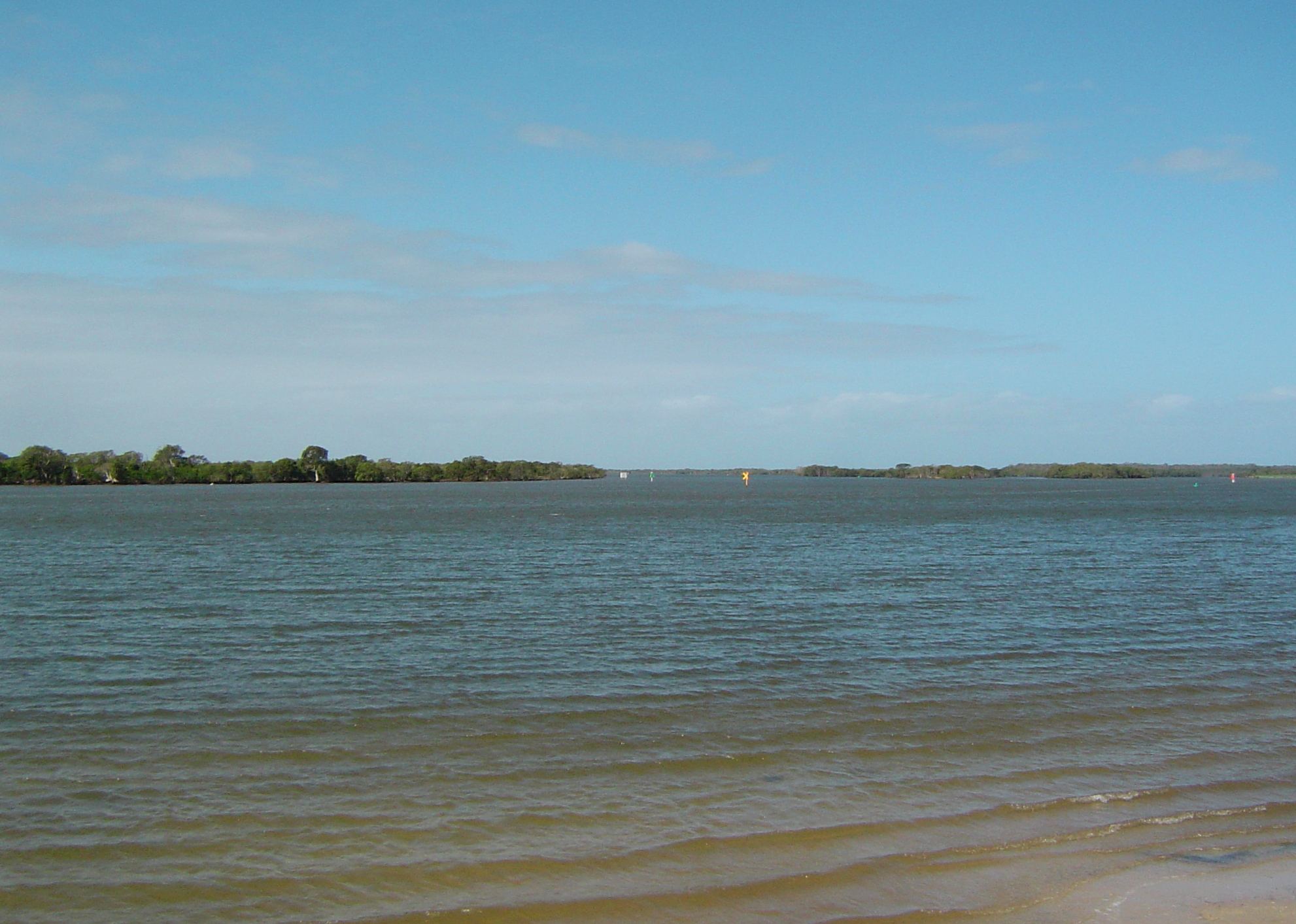
- Tipplers Passage between Kangaroo Island (left of image) and Woogoompah Island, 2014

- Location within Queensland
- Location: Queensland
- Coordinates: 27°43′05″S 153°23′04″E
- Area: 15.70 km^{2} (6.06 sq mi)
- Governing body: Queensland Parks and Wildlife Service

Southern Moreton Bay Islands is a national park in Queensland, Australia, 44 km southeast of Brisbane. It forms part of the Moreton Bay and Pumicestone Passage Important Bird Area, so identified by BirdLife International because it supports large numbers of migratory waders, or shorebirds.

== See also ==
- Protected areas of Queensland
