= Gold Coast Shoreline Management Plan =

The Gold Coast Shoreline Management Plan (GCSMP) is an ICZM plan to manage the coastal resources of City of Gold Coast. The EPA encourages the City Council's to produce shoreline management plans for coastlines and tidal waterways within the local authority area.

The Council commenced work on the GCSMP in 2005. The previous key planning document for Gold Coast beaches was the Delft Report of 1971.

== Delft Report ==
Gold Coast Beaches have had periods of severe beach erosion. In 1967, a series of eleven cyclones removed most of the sand from Gold Coast beaches. The Government of Queensland engaged engineers from Delft University in the Netherlands to advise what to do about the beach erosion. The Delft Report was published in 1971, and outlined a series of works for Gold Coast Beaches including Gold Coast Seaway, works at Narrowneck that resulted in the Northern Gold Coast Beach Protection Strategy and works at the Tweed River that became the Tweed River Entrance Sand Bypassing Project.

== Gold Coast Seawall ==
The Gold Coast seawall in Australia is contained within the Gold Coast's shoreline management plan. The original seawall was laid out following 11 cyclones in 1967 with assistance from coastal engineers from Delft University. The seawall alignment was selected to pick up as many of the older seawalls as possible. The seawall consists of three layers, armour boulders up to 4 tonnes, secondary armour around 360 kg and a clay shale foundation layer. The seawall is 16m across and 6m high and has a front slope of 1:1.5. The seawall was tested in a wave tank to withstand attack from a 1:100 cyclone wave.

The Gold Coast Seawall cost around A$3000 per meter to construct in 2006. The seawall is constructed along a designated seawall alignment along urban sections of the Gold Coast coastline. Non-urban sections of coastline including South Stradbroke Island and the Southport Spit are not licensed for the construction of a seawall. The Gold Coast Planning Scheme requires private property owners along the beach to construct the seawall at their property at the property owners expense prior to making any investment into their house. The Council constructs sections of seawall that protect public land.

== Sand Backpassing from the Gold Coast Seaway to Surfers Paradise ==
The Delft report recommended the stabilisation of the Gold Coast Seaway and the construction of a sand bypass system to pump sand from the mainland under the navigation channel to South Stradbroke Island. The GCSMP will examine whether 20% of the sand could instead be backpassed sustainably to the beaches of Surfers Paradise to mitigate the impact of climate change.

Prior to stabilisation of the Gold Coast Seaway the island welding hypothesis suggests that up to 20% of all sand moving along the Gold Coast (Longshore drift) entered the Gold Coast Broadwater to gradually weld islands onto the mainland.

== Narrowneck Reef ==
In 1971 the Dutch University Delft completed a report for the Queensland State Government recommending the construction of a groyne at Narrowneck. The Council examined the idea of a groyne and instead constructed an artificial reef to stabilise the foreshore at Narrowneck. So far the reef has worked well as a coastal control point, but has been disappointing in its secondary objective to improve surfing. A surprising benefit of the Narrowneck Reef has been its ability to attract marine growth and reef fish and is now a popular diving and fishing location. Narrowneck is particularly popular for kite surfing and longboarding.

== Kurrawa Park Reef ==
The Narrowneck Reef was constructed as a coastal control point 1/3 of the way between Burleigh Heads and the Gold Coast Seaway. The GCSMP will examine if a new reef at Kurrawa Park should be constructed at the 2/3s position to assist with the adaption of Gold Coast beaches to climate change.

== Palm Beach Protection Strategy ==
In 2004 Gold Coast City Council proposed a new beach protection scheme for Palm Beach which included a new reef for 21st Avenue Palm Beach. The proposed scheme included 3 reefs and beach nourishment. Some in the community didn't like the idea and organised a "no reef" protest campaign that prevented the scheme being implemented.

== Currumbin Alley ==
Council dredges Currumbin Creek each year.

== Southern Points ==
The Southern Points of the Gold Coast are northern facing and provide spectacular coastal vistas and great surf.

=== Kirra Point ===
A popular surfing site, surfers are concerned that sand is drowning quality surf, but there is debate about the objectivity of perception of impacts. Council is undertaking nourishment of the foreshore to bury the seawall to increase the amount of recreational parkland.

=== Greenmount Point ===
Surfing waves break along a sand bank that extends from Snapper Rocks through Rainbow Bay, past Greenmount point and Coolangatta, then to Kirra. This region has been called the Superbank

=== Snapper Rocks ===
Surfers lobbied to have the sand outlet moved to improve the Surf at Snapper Rocks

== Tweed River Entrance Sandbypassing ==
A sand bypassing system commenced operating to deliver sand across the Tweed River from New South Wales to Queensland in 2001.

== Gold Coast Oceanway ==
The Gold Coast Oceanway is a 36 kilometres (22 mi) network of pathways along Gold Coast beaches that encourages healthier and more sustainable coastal lifestyles.
