= Main Beach, Queensland =

Main Beach
- Town
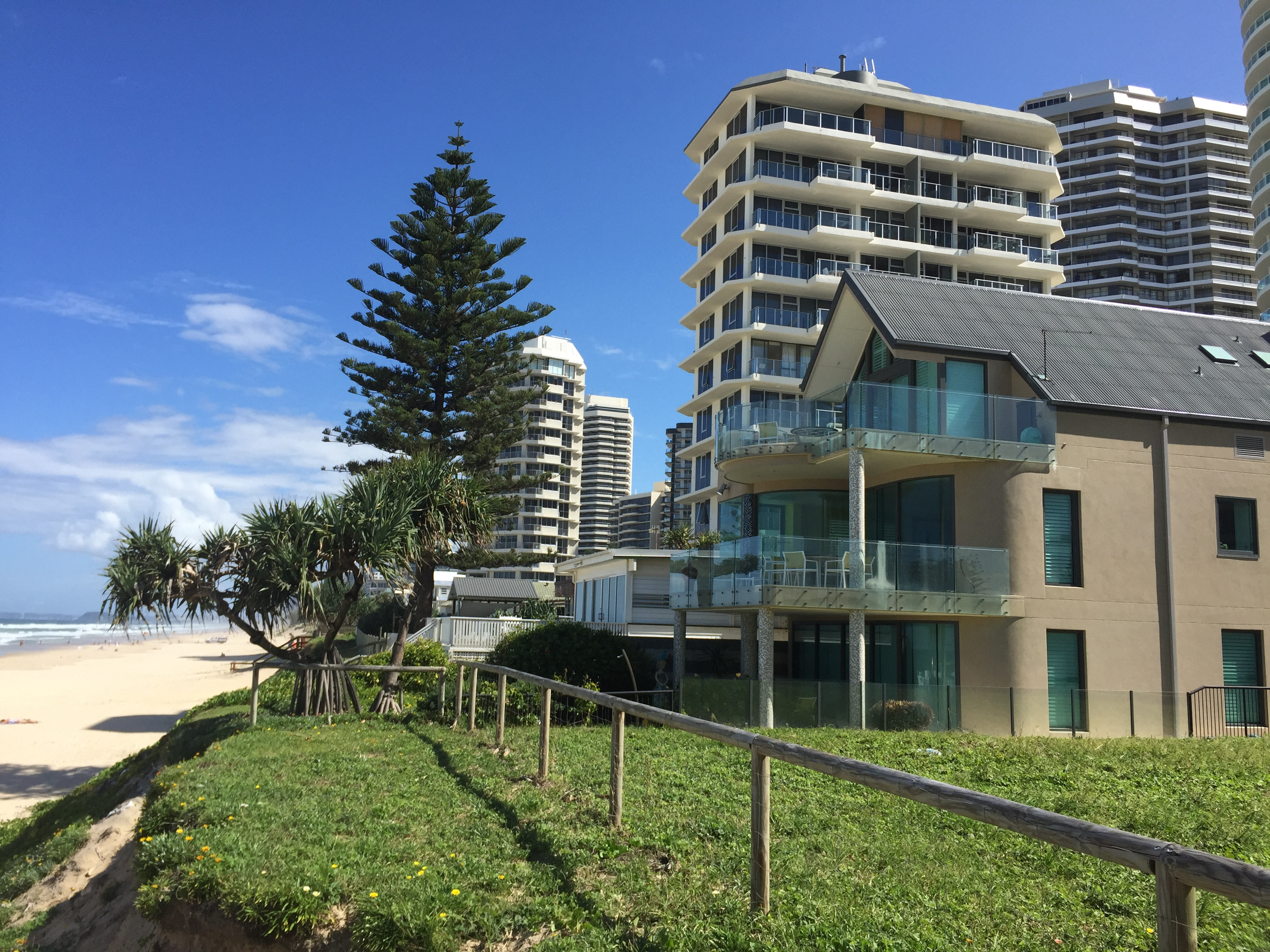
- Foreshore beach houses, 2015

- Interactive map of Main Beach
- Coordinates: 27.9788°S 153.425°E
- Country: Australia
- State: Queensland
- City: Gold Coast
- LGA: City of Gold Coast
- Location: 2.7 km (1.7 mi) N of Surfers Paradise; 2.8 km (1.7 mi) E of Southport; 75.9 km (47.2 mi) SE of Brisbane CBD; 34 km (21 mi) N of Tweed Heads

Government
  - State electorate: Surfers Paradise
  - Federal division: Moncrieff

Area
  - Total: 6.9 km^{2} (2.7 sq mi)
- Elevation: 13 m (43 ft)

Population
  - Total: 3,998 (2021 census)
  - Density: 579/km^{2} (1,501/sq mi)
- Time zone: UTC+10:00 (AEST)
- Postcode: 4217
Localities around Main Beach
Biggera Waters; Labrador	South Stradbroke	Coral Sea
Southport	Main Beach	Coral Sea
Southport	Surfers Paradise	Coral Sea

Main Beach (originally Southport East) is a coastal town and suburb in the City of Gold Coast, Queensland, Australia. In the 2021 census, the suburb of Main Beach had a population of 3,998 people.

== Geography ==
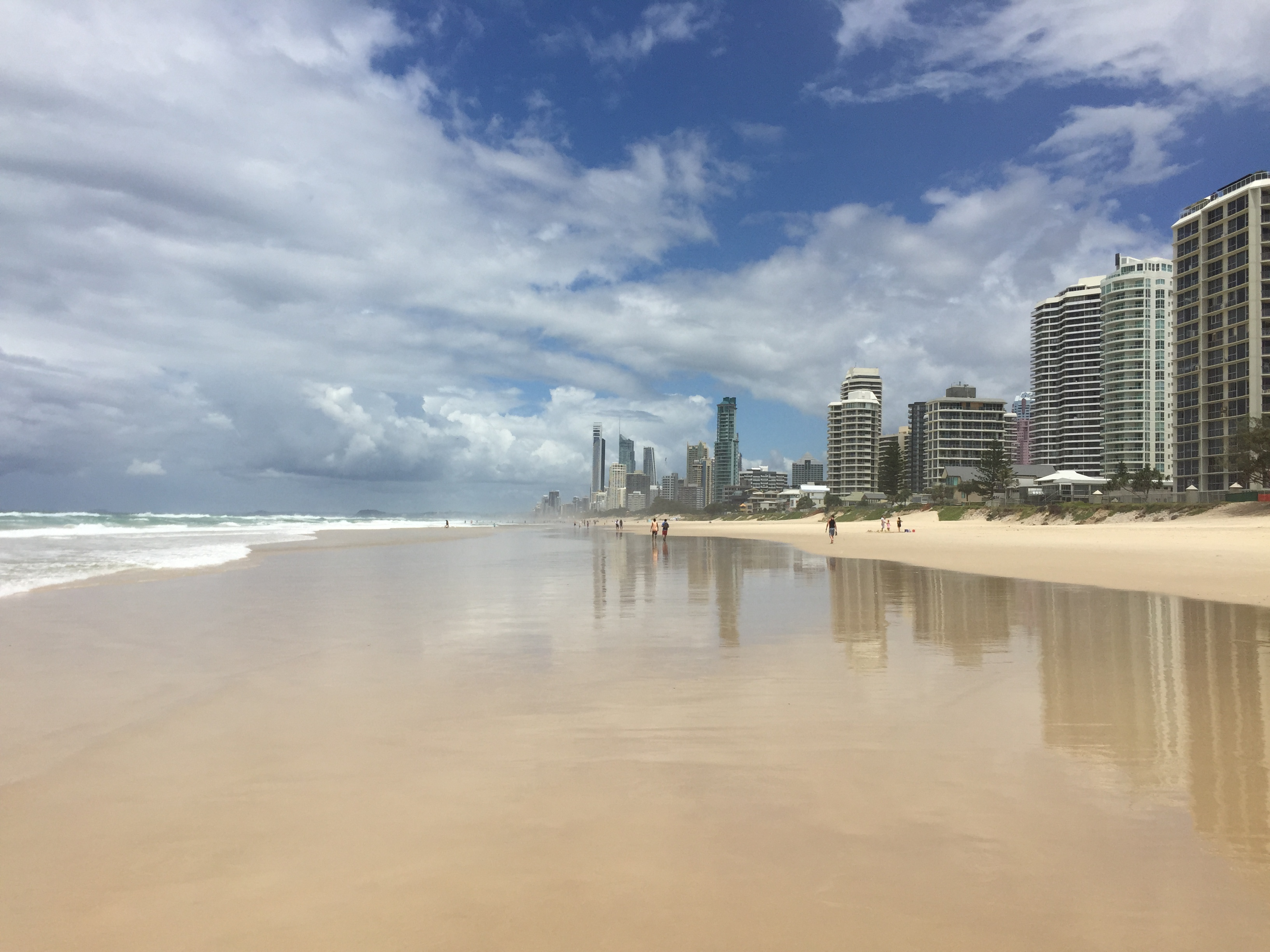
The beach of the Main Beach at low tide

Historically, the Main Beach area was a narrow strip of coastal sand dunes separating the mouth of the Nerang River (27.9755°S 153.4225°E) from the Coral Sea. Narrow Neck formed the southern boundary and to the north was a long sand spit terminated by the bar between the Broadwater and the sea. This created a natural basin for boats at the mouth of the river protected from the sea by the Main Beach area.

As at 2021, the suburb of Main Beach is bounded to the east by the Coral Sea, to the north by the Gold Coast Seaway, to the west by Labrador Channel and South Channel, and Macintosh Island, and to the south by Narrow Neck (27.9865°S 153.4297°E).

== History ==
During the early years in which Southport was the urban centre of recreational activity at the coast, visitors were ferried across the Broadwater to surf at the Main Beach so named because it was the main surf beach for the town of Southport.

Until the 1870s and 1880s the only activity in the sand spit at the northern end was limited to facilities associated with the Southport Yacht Club and other maritime activities.

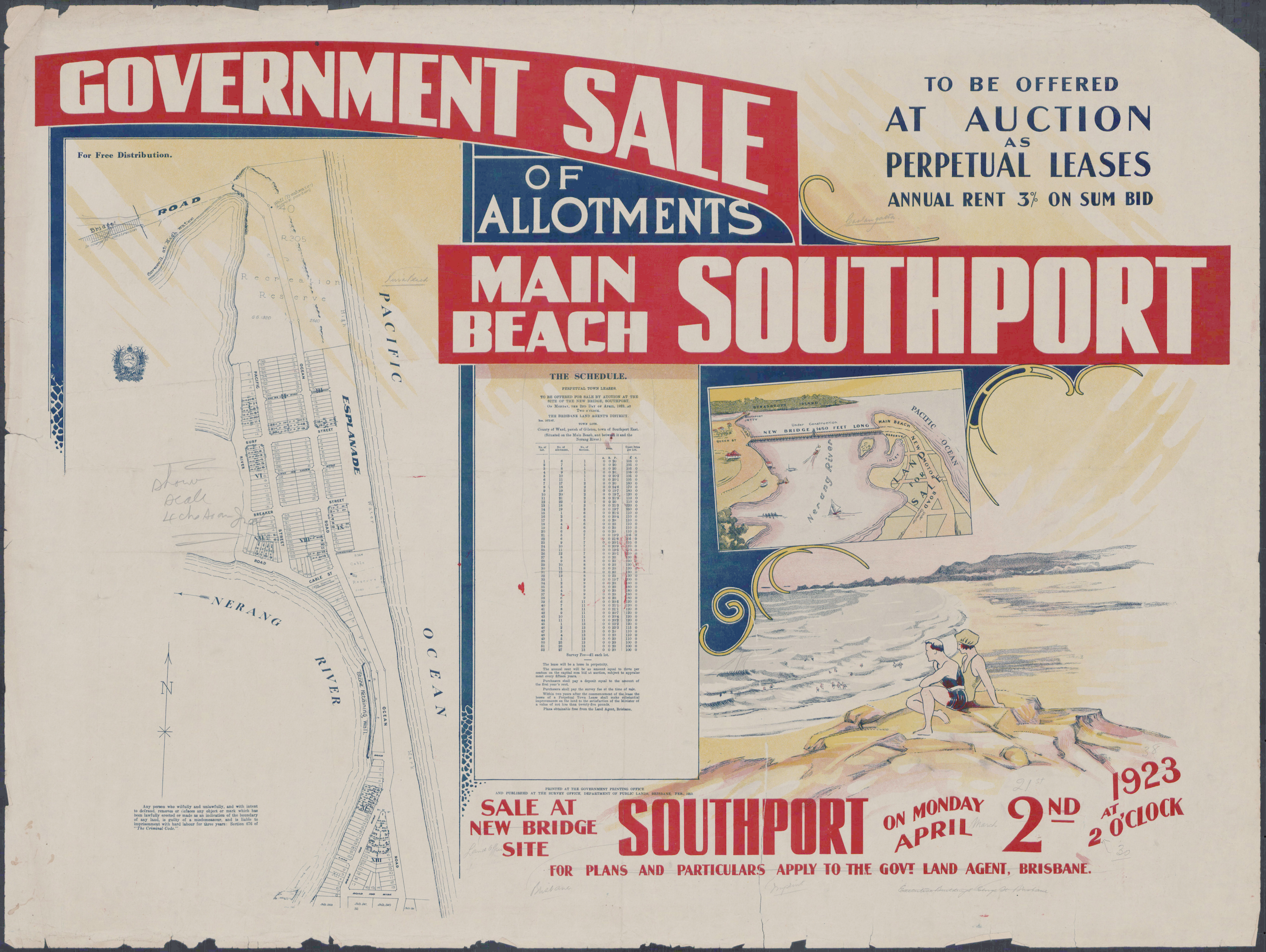
Government sales of allotments Main Beach Southport (with map), 1923

The construction of the Jubilee Bridge led to land sales in the area. The Queensland Government surveyed 252 blocks of land for perpetual land leases which it sold in stages from December 1922. The area became more popular following the opening of the bridge in 1926, when land was purchased and holiday houses were constructed. Some guest houses were also constructed but little or no permanent population was located in the area. Some evidence remains of the area's early popularity as a surfing beach in the beachfront planting and the kiosk and shelter shed from 1934.

In the 1950s, reclamation of the Nerang River to the west of the earlier subdivision created the area centred on Tedder Avenue. A different subdivision pattern in that portion of Main Beach is the result.

The construction of the Sundale Bridge and the deviation of the highway to the west of Main Beach took place in the late 1960s.

Similarly the land to the north of the early subdivision – the sand spit that formed one bank of the bar – was only recently developed. Its use is still limited to resort hotels and theme parks now occupy the land. Revegetation of the Southport Spit followed the construction of the Gold Coast Seaway and gives particular character to this area and acts to link the more intensively developed area to the south with the open areas of the Broadwater and Southern Moreton Bay.

Main Beach property has developed as a high rise area only relatively recently and is focused on the Tedder Avenue which features restaurants, cafes, and boutiques. It has a sense of more permanent residential neighbourhood than other parts of the high-rise coastal strip. Most of the apartment buildings along the foreshore are more modest in scale. The isthmus at Narrowneck acts as a natural barrier to the more intensively developed area to the south.

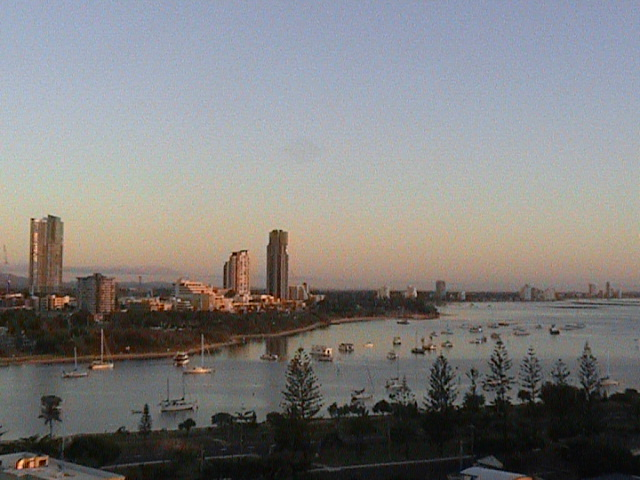
View north to Southport and Gold Coast Broadwater, 2007

The Gold Coast Oceanway travels on the seaward side of the Southport SLSC but then diverts inland to travel behind beachfront houses of Main Beach down to Narrowneck. Some local residents would like a new Oceanway pavement constructed along the road reserve between the beachfront houses and the dune area.

A large number of Norfolk Island pines (Araucaria heterophylla), a conifer that is not native to the area, have been planted on the Main Beach foreshore.

On 1 September 1967, the town of Southport East was officially renamed Main Beach.

== Demographics ==
In the 2011 census, the suburb of Main Beach had a population of 3,496 people.

In the 2016 census, the suburb of Main Beach had a population of 3,883 people. 59.4% of people were born in Australia. The next most common countries of birth were New Zealand 5.6% and England 5.3%. 75.6% of people spoke only English at home. The most common responses for religion were No Religion 26.9%, Catholic 23.3% and Anglican 18.1%.

In the 2021 census, the suburb of Main Beach had a population of 3,998 people.

== Heritage listings ==
Main Beach logo

Main Beach has a number of heritage-listed sites, including:

- Main Beach Pavilion and Southport Surf Lifesaving Club, off Macarthur Parade (27.9753°S 153.4286°E)
- the former Southport Cable Hut, Main Beach Parade (27.9836°S 153.4289°E)
- Humphreys Boat Shed (now demolished), Seaworld Drive ( 27.9718°S 153.4276°E)

== Education ==
There are no schools in Main Beach. The nearest government primary and secondary schools are Southport State School and Southport State High School, both in neighbouring Southport to the west. There are also a number of non-government schools in Southport and nearby.

== Amenities ==
Southport Yacht Club Marina is a 5.3-hectare (13-acre) marina at 1 Macarthur Parade (27.9726°S 153.4257°E).

There is a boat ramp, pontoon and floating walkway in Proud Park on Waterways Drive on the south bank of Nerang River (27.9782°S 153.4223°E). It is managed by the Gold Coast City Council.

There are two boat ramps and a pontoon in Muriel Henchman Park on Muriel Henchman Drive off Seaworld Drive, The Spit (27.9514°S 153.4246°E). They are managed by the Gold Coast City Council.

Gold Coast Seaway has a jetty at the northern end of The Spit (27.9386°S 153.4276°E). It is managed by the Gold Coast Waterways Authority.

There are a number of parks in the suburb:

- Cable Park (27.9837°S 153.4292°E)
- Doug Jennings Park (27.9408°S 153.4243°E)
- Federation Walk Coastal Reserve (27.9494°S 153.4283°E)
- Helen Park (27.9815°S 153.4239°E)
- Hindle Reserve (27.9809°S 153.4297°E)
- Hollindale Park (27.9739°S 153.4289°E)
- Main Beach Place (27.9759°S 153.4283°E)
- Mcintosh Island Park (27.9862°S 153.4296°E)
- Muriel Henchman Park (27.9477°S 153.4253°E)
- Narrowneck (27.9860°S 153.4299°E)
- Naval Reserve Memorial Park (27.9736°S 153.4264°E)
- Pelican Beach (27.9770°S 153.4232°E)
- Philip Park (27.9651°S 153.4286°E)
- Proud Park (27.9768°S 153.4238°E)
- Ted Dolby Place (27.9762°S 153.4258°E)

== Attractions ==
Sea World is a tourist attraction on Seaworld Drive in the north of the suburb (27.9583°S 153.4254°E).

Main Beach Tourist Park is a caravan park on 3600 Main Beach Parade (27.9772°S 153.4280°E). It is operated by the Gold Coast City Council.
