= Narrow Neck =

Narrow Neck may refer to:

- Narrow Neck, Antarctica, neck of land between Langevad Glacier and Daniell Peninsula
- Narrow Neck, New Zealand, a suburb of Auckland
- Narrow Neck Plateau, in the Blue Mountains, near Katoomba, New South Wales, Australia
- Narrowneck, Queensland, a section of coastline in Queensland, Australia
