= Wheat Creek Culvert =

Heritage-listed culvert in Brisbane, Queensland

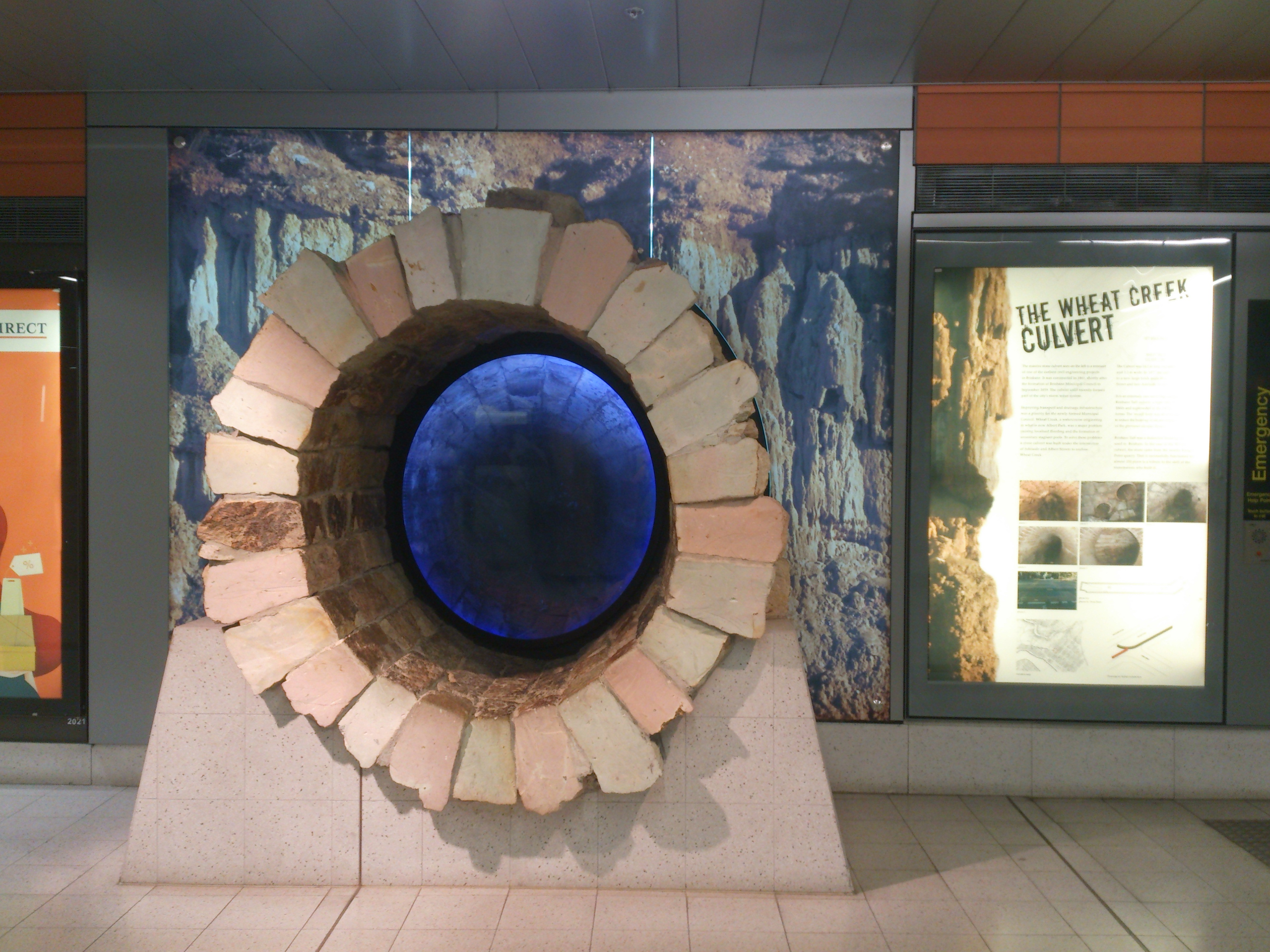
- Wheat Creek Culvert on display in the King George Square bus station

- Location within Queensland Location within Australia
- 27.4689°S 153.0245°E
- Location: Adelaide Street, Brisbane City, Queensland, Australia

History
- Design period: 1840s–1860s (mid-19th century)
- Built: 1861

Site notes
- Architect: Christopher Porter

Queensland Heritage Register
- Official name: Wheat Creek Culvert, Big Creek Culvert
- Type: state heritage (built, archaeological)
- Designated: 24 January 2003
- Delisted: June 2015
- Reference no.: 602218
- Significant period: 1861 (fabric); 1860s (historical)
- Builders: H C Love

Wheat Creek Culvert was a heritage-listed culvert at Adelaide Street, Brisbane City, Queensland, Australia. It was designed by Christopher Porter and built in 1861 by H C Love. It is also known as Big Creek Culvert. It was added to the Queensland Heritage Register on 24 January 2003, but was removed in June 2015 after it was destroyed to create the Inner Northern Busway. However, a short section was preserved as a feature in the King George Square busway station.

== History ==
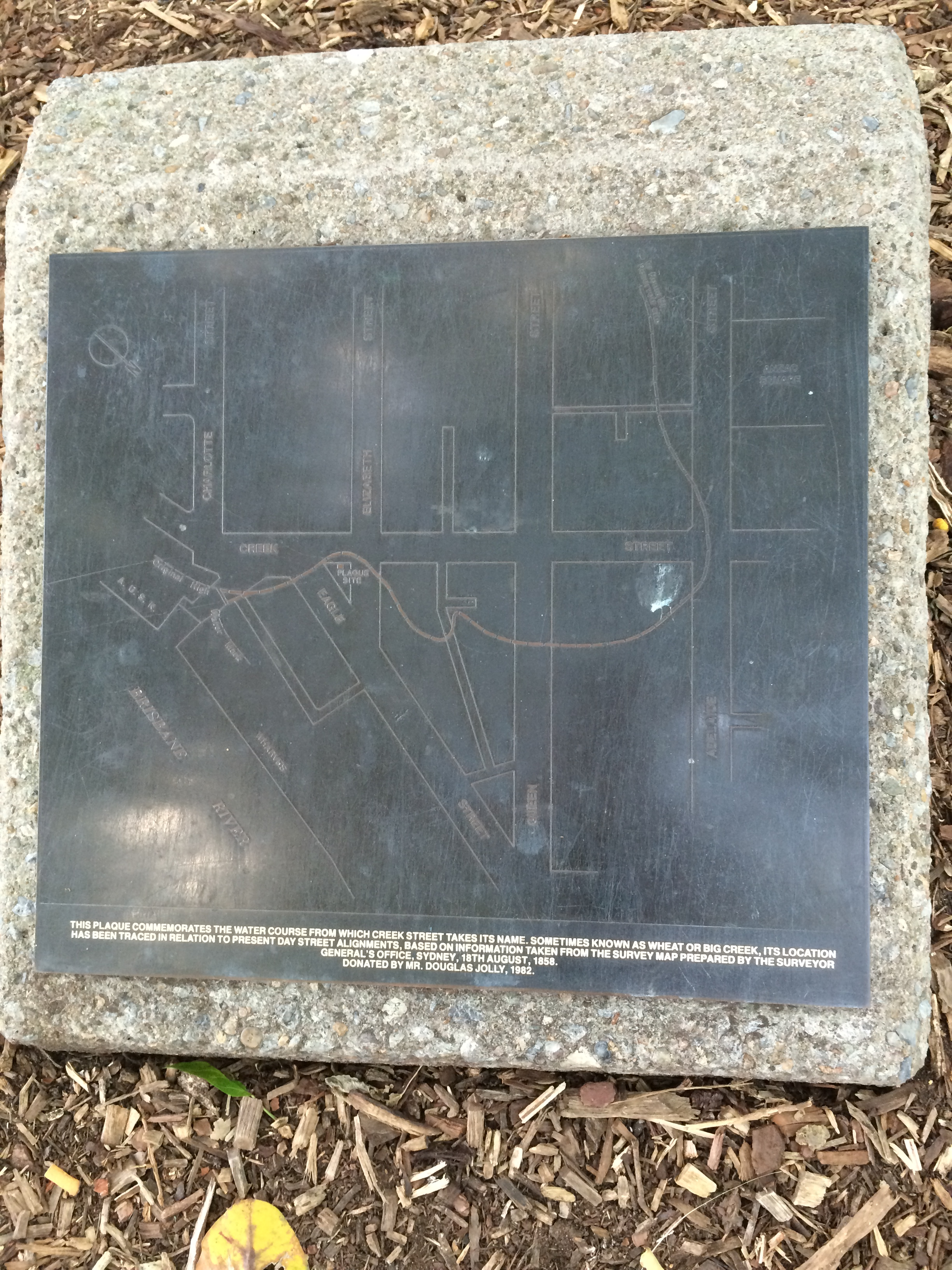
Map showing the route of the now-underground Wheat Creek which gives Creek Street, Brisbane its name, 2015

The Wheat Creek culvert was constructed in 1861 as part of Brisbane city's drainage system, and was one of the first civil engineering projects of the newly formed Brisbane Municipal Council. In 1825 the penal settlement at Moreton Bay was moved from Redcliffe to Brisbane, where a reliable supply of water could be found. This was the Wheat Creek (also known as the 'Big Creek') that rose near the site of the modern Brisbane Grammar School, in College Road. The creek flowed through what was later the Roma Street railway yards, forming a lagoon between modern George and Roma Streets and to the so-called horse pond formerly in front of the present Brisbane City Hall site. From here the creek flowed diagonally across the present Adelaide and Albert Streets intersection between Queen and Adelaide Streets and entered the river at the end of the present Creek Street. The bed of the creek is still visible down the service laneways in Adelaide Street.

In 1827 the first bridge was built across the Wheat Creek for a track to windmill on Spring Hill. This bridge was built from the intersection of Albert and Adelaide Streets and was replaced in 1861. Under the direction of Captain Patrick Logan an earth dam was built across the creek between Roma and Little Roma streets in the late 1820s (approximately near the western wall of the present Magistrates' Court building). Water was carried from the dam through a pipeline made of hollow hardwood logs to the soldier's barracks near George and Queens Streets, and then to the Commandant's house in modern Queens Gardens. A convict-operated treadmill pumped water along the pipeline. In 1859 a large tank was built near the dam at Tank Street. This original water supply remained until 1866, when the new Enoggera Reservoir on Breakfast Creek (now Enoggera Creek), west of the modern suburb of The Gap was commissioned. Water was supplied to the town from the dam through a wrought iron pipe system, commencing with a 20-inch (510 mm) main pipe travelling via modern suburbs The Gap, Ashgrove, Bardon and Milton, and ultimately via 6-inch (150 mm) distribution pipes in the town centre.

The Municipality of Brisbane, which was proclaimed on 7 September 1859, covered an area of ridges and swamps that could not be drained. The rainfall runoff found its way naturally to the swamps and then via a series of lagoons and swamps to the river. High spring tides however caused much of the surrounding land to be impassable in wet weather. This meant that ensuring good water supply and drainage were the most urgent jobs for the new council.

Before the 1840s simple surface drains or covered drains were used in towns. Surface drains carried off surface water by making the road section higher in the centre than at the sides. The simplest form of covered drain was the box drain that had a broad flat bottom. These drains caused problems because it was common for the entire volume of the drain to be completely filled and blocked. Another type of covered drain was the circular or barrel drain. They were rarely used, as they were more expensive and less effective than box drains. With the development of the ovoid or "egg-shaped" drains there was a dramatic improvement in the effectiveness of drainage systems. John Phillips designed the first ovoid drain in the 1840s and advocated that in order to have proper drainage of towns, separate drainage systems should be used for stormwater and sewage. The ovoid drains concentrated the flow of the water to the bottom of the drain and therefore decreased the likelihood of silting and blockage. In the beginning, these drains were made of stone but by the 1870s they were mainly built of cheaper brick

The first drain in Brisbane was constructed in 1860 and was a stone ovoid drain that ran down Albert Street, from Elizabeth Street to the creek at Margaret Street. Although this drain was above ground level it had a very shallow grade.

On Thursday 24 January 1861 a tender was called for a culvert to enclose Wheat Creek under the road and box drains for water entry and exit to the design of new City Surveyor, Christopher Porter. H C Love's tender for the sum of £830 was accepted on the 4 February 1861.

In 1863 a brick drain, 18 inches (460 mm) in diameter, was laid from Edward Street to Eagle Street, but, prior to 1875, very little was done to provide Brisbane with a reliable water supply or an efficient drainage system. The Brisbane Drainage act of 1875 gave the Governor in Council the powers of the Municipal Council with respect to drainage and sewerage. The drainage and sewerage work was entrusted to the Department of Harbours and Rivers. William David Nisbet, Engineer for Harbours and Rivers, took charge of the design and construction of the city drainage. The primary concern was the creek downstream of the Albert Street and Adelaide Street intersection, which was then the only area developed.

An ovoid brick drain running down Adelaide Street between Albert to Creek Street was completed in March 1877. It joined the Brisbane tuff culvert and is still in use. The downstream 25-metre (82 ft) section of the drain was supported on timber piling. A branch culvert for drainage of private allotments between Queen and Adelaide streets, which consisted of an egg-shaped drain at a flat grade of 4 feet (1.2 m) in a mile, was also built during this time (uncovered during construction of Queen's Plaza). Nisbet also designed a brick storm water drainage system that ran under Makerston Street and drained the Roma Street area to the Brisbane River. In other parts of the city various other culverts and drains were completed in 1877. Nisbet suggested that all the drains completed in 1877, in addition to those already in existence, should be kept exclusively for surface water.

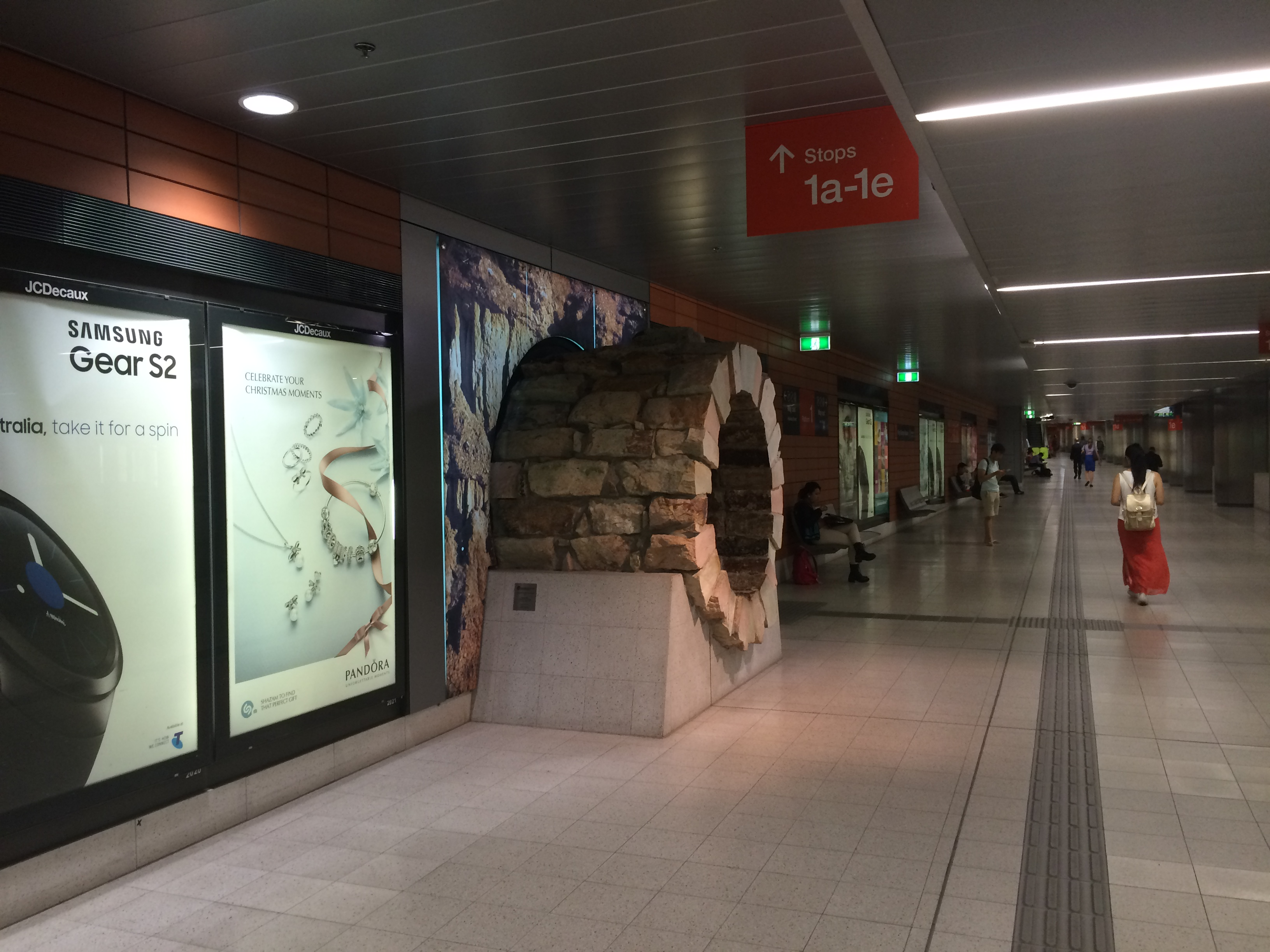
Segment of the Wheat Creek Culvert on display in the King George Square busway station, 2015

The culvert and drainage system around the intersection remained in use until 2008. The Brisbane City Council carried out a video investigation of the culvert in May 2000 as part of the light rail project being undertaken by Queensland Transport.

In 2008, the culvert was dismantled as part of the construction of the Inner Northern Busway, and a section of it was reassembled as a feature in the new King George Square busway station. It was considered sufficiently degraded in heritage value that it was delisted from the Queensland Heritage Register as "destroyed" in June 2015.

== Description ==
Prior to being moved for the busway construction, the Brisbane tuff ovoid culvert, which has been covered by successive layers of fill, was located under the intersection of Albert and Adelaide Street. On the Brisbane City Council Bimap it was mapped as the Line 28 between sealed manholes 11 and 12.

The culvert is constructed of Brisbane Tuff, commonly known as porphyry and appears to be unaltered from its original design, which is shown on the Brisbane City Council Plan D-1-8 and is approximately 16 metres (52 ft) long, 1,350 millimetres (53 in) high and 1,330 millimetres (52 in) wide. The Brisbane Tuff (porphyry) blocks of the culvert are hammer dressed blocks of between 500 and 700 millimetres (20 and 28 in) in length, 150 millimetres (5.9 in) in height, and up to 400–500 millimetres (16–20 in) in depth. There are twenty-five of these blocks which comprise the culvert.

Two inlet drains entered the culvert from Albert Street in its original location. The first drain is approximately square and measures 450 by 450 millimetres (18 in × 18 in) and the second is a box drain that measures 800 by 500 millimetres (31 in × 20 in). An ovoid brick drain running the length of Adelaide Street from Albert to Creek Street joins the culvert and carries the water to the Brisbane River. At the time of its heritage listing, it was reported that the sheer weight of the culvert appeared to hold the structure together as there was little mortar visible in the lower levels. There was however some patches of mortar visible between the blocks in the upper levels. At the western end there was some slurry build up on the floor from outside building projects but it is generally in good condition.

== Heritage listing ==
Wheat Creek Culvert was listed on the Queensland Heritage Register on 24 January 2003 having satisfied the following criteria.

The place is important in demonstrating the evolution or pattern of Queensland's history.

The Wheat Creek culvert at the intersection of Albert and Adelaide Street is one of the earliest surviving examples of a civil engineering project that was administered by the then newly formed Brisbane Municipal Council. The culvert is still in use today as a storm water drain.

The place demonstrates rare, uncommon or endangered aspects of Queensland's cultural heritage.

The Brisbane Tuff (porphyry) ovoid culvert is significant as a rare surviving example of a long Brisbane Tuff (porphyry) culvert in Queensland. The culvert is also rare as stone ovoid drains were only constructed in the early 1860s. By the 1870s drains were constructed mainly of cheaper brick.

The place has potential to yield information that will contribute to an understanding of Queensland's history.

With further research the culvert has the potential to contribute to an understanding of the development of Brisbane's drainage system.

The place is important in demonstrating the principal characteristics of a particular class of cultural places.

As the culvert appears to be in good condition and unaltered from its original design it is a good example of a Brisbane Tuff (porphyry) ovoid culvert from the 1860s.

The place is important in demonstrating a high degree of creative or technical achievement at a particular period.

The Brisbane Tuff (porphyry) ovoid culvert is significant as part of the storm water drainage system of the 1860s and 70s that showed great technical achievement. With the development of the ovoid drains there was a dramatic improvement in the effectiveness of drainage systems.

== Delisting ==
In 2011, the Heritage Act was amended to allow destroyed sites to be removed from the Queensland Heritage Register. As at 2017, five sites had been removed, including the Wheat Creek Culvert, which was demolished as part of an approved development, the Inner Northern Busway.
