= Southport Spit =

Place in Queensland, Australia

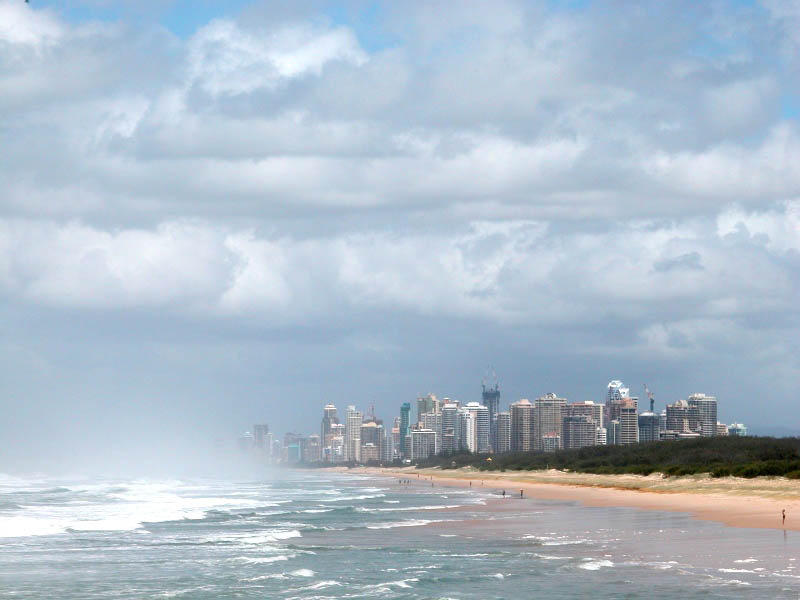
Looking south towards Surfers Paradise on the Southport Spit

The Southport Spit (officially known as The Spit) is a spit and neighbourhood within the northern end of Main Beach, City of Gold Coast, Queensland, Australia. It is a permanent sand spit that separates the Southport Broadwater from the Pacific Ocean.

== Geography ==
Seaworld Drive is the main street connecting the area of The Spit to the rest of Main Beach. Parklands and naturally vegetated sand dunes on the eastern ocean side of the Spit start in Main Beach at Kemp Street and Main Beach Parade and run continuously to the tip of the Spit.

== History ==
There was a township called Moondarewa located on the southern tip of Stradbroke Island (now South Stradbroke Island). On 9 February 1881 the Queensland Government auctioned 156 town lots at Moondarewa which was described as "southern end of Stradbroke Island and opposite Southport" (. The name Moondarewa is a corruption of the Aboriginal name Moonjerrabah which was the name for a mosquito. Moondarewa was located in the area near where Seaworld is located today (27.9300°S 153.42556°E).

The Spit was formed between 1897 and 1898, a product of longshore drift when high seas broke through at Jumpinpin (27.7306°S 153.4453°E), a narrow section of land on Stradbroke Island. This made a new ocean passage, the Jumpinpin Channel, which divided Stradbroke Island in two (North Stradbroke Island and South Stradbroke Island). The continuous longshore drift it created continued to erode South Stradbroke Island and the township of Moondarewa began to be lost to the sea from the late 1930s during storms as the Broadwater Entrance migrated northwards.

During the 1940s the Southport Yacht Club grew and added marina facilities for the increasing number of private boats wanting to moor on the Spits' eastern side of the Broadwater. Since the 1950s and '60s, the local prawning industry used The Spit for their berth.

The Spit continued to develop, with tourist attractions opening in the 1960s. It is now home to Sea World theme park, an upmarket shopping restaurant and bar precinct and several resorts.

Navigational difficulties caused boating accidents, prompting the planning and design of the Gold Coast Seaway, built from 1984 to 1986. The design relied on data from the Beach Protection Authority to prevent it becoming a baymouth bar connecting to South Stradbroke Island. Construction of the project had six main phases:

- retaining walls using approximately one million tonnes of imported rock
- dredging 4.5 million cubic metres sand
- closure of the old entrance
- sand bypassing system
- revegetation
- sewage outfall.

In 2018, the Spit Master Plan was announced to revitalise the area for community use. At at October 2024, the work is still in progress.

== Attractions ==
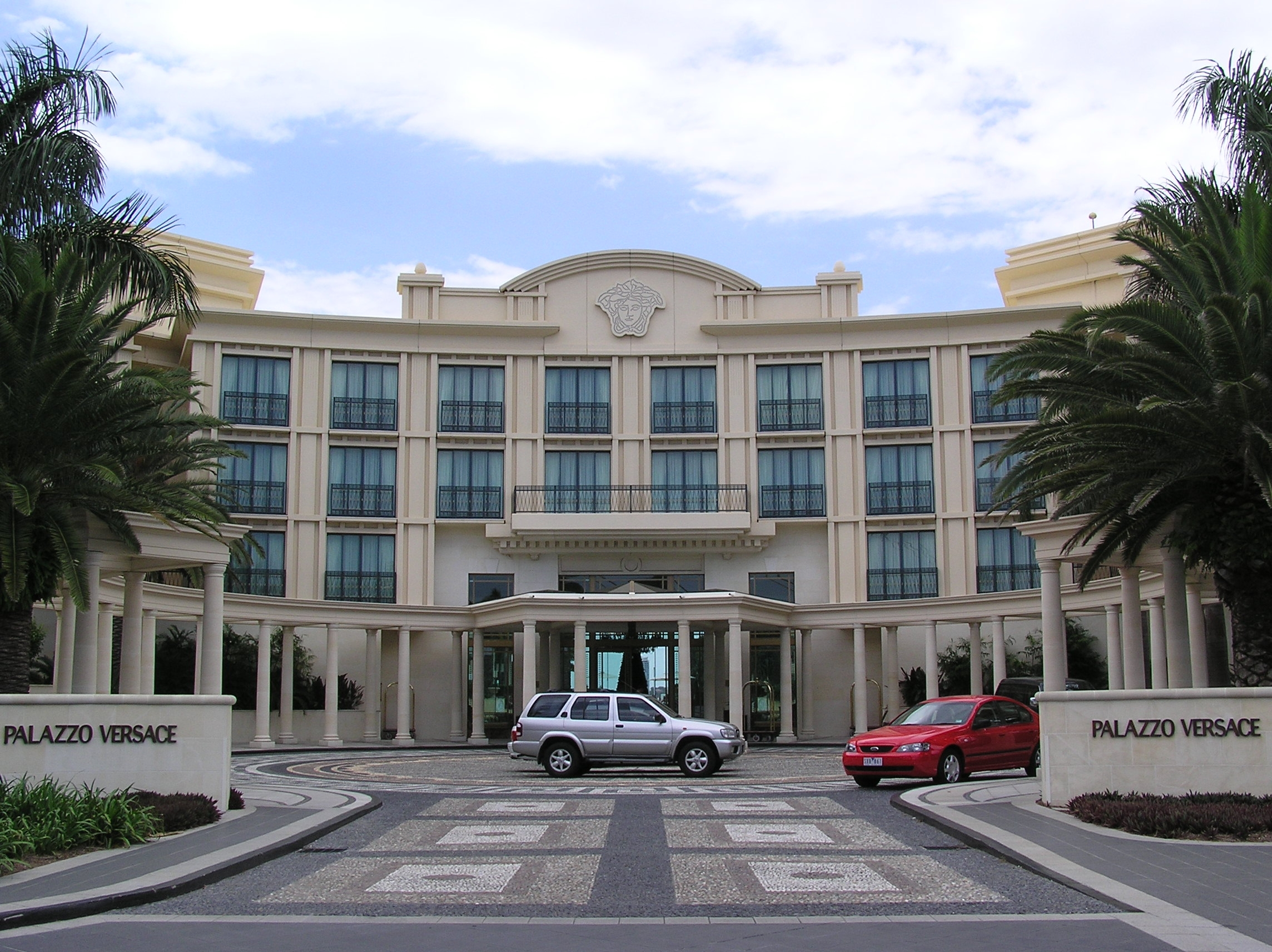
The Palazzo Versace Hotel

The Southport Spit is home to Sea World (27.9559°S 153.4257°E), Sea World Resort, the Sheraton Mirage Resort and Spa, as well as Palazzo Versace (27.9670°S 153.4259°E). Sea World expanded after purchasing a rival attraction, Marineland, in 1976. Marineland was situated on the site of the current Sheraton resort.

On the end of The Spit is the Gold Coast Sand Pumping Jetty (27.9386°S 153.4324°E), a popular destination for fishermen and part of the Gold Coast Seaway's Sand Bypassing System.

The Gold Coast Oceanway and the Federation Walk (27.9435°S 153.4266°E) provide opportunities for pedestrians and cyclists to explore the Spit.

The Federation Walk Coastal Reserve (27.950°S 153.428°E) is a reserve comprising the eastern part of The Spit.

There are a number of parks:

- Doug Jennings Park is at the northern end (27.9390°S 153.4249°E)
- Philip Park, east of Sea World (27.9646°S 153.4286°E), popular for wedding photographs
- Hollindale Park at the southern end has picnic facilities (27.9734°S 153.4289°E)

Doug Jennings Park covers the whole north end of The Spit, with views to Wave Break Island to the east and South Stradbroke Island to the north. It is a popular family park, suitable for fishing, diving, surfing, boating and swimming.

== See also ==
- Spit (landform)
- Gold Coast Seaway
