= Humphreys Boat Shed =

- Location within Queensland Location within Australia
- 27.9718°S 153.4276°E
- Location: Seaworld Drive, Main Beach, Queensland, Australia

Queensland Heritage Register
- Official name: Humphreys Boat Shed & Slipway
- Type: state heritage (built)
- Designated: 31 August 2001
- Delisted: June 2015
- Reference no.: 602324

Humphreys Boat Shed was a heritage-listed workshop and slipway at Seaworld Drive, Main Beach, Queensland, Australia. It was added to the Queensland Heritage Register on 31 August 2001, but was removed in June 2015 having been destroyed. However the remnants of the boat shed and slipway are listed on the Gold Coast Local Heritage Register.

== History ==
Humphreys Boat Shed was constructed in 1955 by John Llewellyn Humphreys. It was from this building that Humphreys established his marine workshop and slipway servicing the boating and prawn trawling industries.

The area that was later to be called the Gold Coast area known to the Indigenous population as Kurrungul, referring to the large supply of hardwood) was first surveyed in 1840 by Robert Dixon. In 1842 permanent settlement began as loggers, sawyers and millers moved into the area drawn to the forest by the massive stands of mature cedars (Toona australis) which stretched from the Coomera to the Tweed River. While timber was the main industry at the southern end of the Gold Coast, farming developed at the northern end.

Surveyor Dixon had hoped that the "boat passage" at the mouth of the Broadwater might serve as an alternative port of entry to Moreton Bay. By 1862, however, Colonial Portmaster, George Poynter Heath considered that the boat passage, as it was known, could not be used as such due to the heavy surf breaking across the entrance when the wind blew on shore. Further, Heath considered that the entrance offered little prospect of ever being of any practical service for navigation purposes.

As early as 1825, the British Government had instructed the Governor of New South Wales to ensure that "lands in the neighbourhood of navigable streams or the sea coast", which might serve as quays and landing places be reserved from future sale to private individuals. Consequently, the initial reservation of land at the northern end of Main Beach survived, and was formally proclaimed by the gazettal of a "Reserve for Public Purposes" as of 26 June 1872.

Following the breakthrough at Jumpinpin after 1896, a dramatic change occurred at the southern end of the Broadwater. By 1916 a low sand spit was developing northwards from what was the northern extremity of Main Beach. By the time the Spit was becoming a permanent landform, Southport had long been established as a prosperous resort and commercial centre. Main Beach, following the First World War, had become a popular surfing beach.

From the inception of Southport as a popular resort for Queensland's wealthier citizens in the early 1870s, the Broadwater had been promoted as "the fisherman's rendezvous". It also became a popular with yachtspeople, with the first Southport Regatta being held at Easter 1879. By the 1930s, the area had become a popular mooring spot for an increasing number of private boat owners.

By 1946, the Lands Department had received applications by private individuals for leasehold title of land on the Spit, as well as numerous applications for dredging rights for mineral sands. In April 1948 the Land Commissioner reported against the idea of any improvement of the land, believing that there was every chance of further breakthroughs from the ocean to the Broadwater during cyclonic weather. There was however, already some private activity occurring on crown land in the area, with John Humphreys operating several ex-wartime landing barges from moorings in the Basin. The wartime and post-war boom in mineral sands production meant a ready demand for barges carrying dredged sand from South Stradbroke Island to the rutile works in Southport, and Humphreys was one of the first to capitalise on the need for appropriate transport craft.

John Llewellyn Humphreys was born on 15 June 1915 at Mount Morgan, the son of a local journalist John Miller Humphreys and Lillian Calloway. The Humphreys family eventually settled in Brisbane where J. L. Humphreys worked for the motor dealers, Annand & Thompson and for the US Airforce at Archerfield Aerodrome during the Second World War. In 1946 Humphreys moved to Southport where he established a marine engineering service for the growing number of boatsmen and women visiting the town.

Humphreys was able to obtain the rights to a temporary lease (or at least permission) from the Southport Town Council at the "Boat Basin" to beach his barges and to service private yachts. Humphreys had initially used the area now utilised by the Southport Yacht Club to service craft and moor his barges. The Club however (which had originally been granted the lease of land at Currigee on South Stradbroke Island in 1948), opted for the site, and was granted a lease over the site in December 1952. Humphreys then obtained a temporary lease over an unsurveyed site some two hundred metres to the north, and once assured of the site, he commenced construction of a permanent slipway and boatshed.

Humphreys was first registered as an elector in the Southport electorate as of 1 July 1953, described as an engineer, with his address as the "Boat Basin, Southport". Work had commenced on a two-storey fibro building by 1955, with the first floor verandah 10 feet (3.0 m) above ground level, fronting a wooden landing. The roof was pitched at an angle to allow for the later construction of a larger building and covered slipway. This included his own living quarters, where his wife Mavis came to live after their marriage in 1959.

Immediately to the north of the building was a concrete slipway incorporating railway lines. By April 1965, when Humphreys successfully applied for a thirty-year special lease (SL 29252) on the site, he had prepared a concrete and brick foundation for the construction of extensions. The site, surveyed by William Lindley Bennett on 24 July 1964, was given the description of Portion 226 and comprised 36 perches (910 m^{2}).

Over the next eighteen months, Humphreys constructed a duplicate two storey extension, connected to the existing building by a covered slipway. It incorporated an all-weather slipway, full engineering facilities, woodworking loft and Humphreys' residence. The completed building appears in photographs taken of the opening ceremonies of the new Gold Coast Bridge over the Nerang River in December 1966.

When it was constructed, Humphreys boat shed was the most northerly building on the Spit, and remained as such until the establishment of Marine Land in the late 1960s. The distinctive two storey building loomed large on the horizon when viewed from the Southport Esplanade. It was also a state-of-the-art slipway and repair shop for some time. Both the yacht club and Humphreys' slipway attracted an ever-increasing number of private boats to the Basin, and eventually influenced the marina developments on the Spit in the 1980s. Humphreys boat shed became something of an institution amongst local and visiting "boaties" and the business gained an enviable reputation for quality service.

Humphreys boat shed was one of Broadwater's few flourishing waterfront industries, reminiscent of the days when smaller boat sheds had operated on the northern bank of the Nerang River downstream from The Southport School. As the Southport trawler fleet developed in the 1950s and 1960s, Humphreys slip played an important role in servicing trawlers. In an area which has undergone immense change since the Second World War, the Southport Yacht Club and Humphreys boat shed and slipway are direct links with the past, surviving as now rare reminders of one of the earliest activities which first brought tourists to the Gold Coast 130 years ago.

Mavis Humphreys died on 27 July 1998, and John Humphreys died on 1 March 2001. The Humphreys' lease was surrendered and the land is now in the custodianship of the Department of Natural Resources.

In January 2005, it was proposed to demolish the boat shed because of concerns it contained dangerous materials including asbestos. It was demolished in May 2005. However, claims persisted that the demolition was to facilitate the redevelopment of the land, given the ongoing proposal to establish a cruise ship terminal in that area.

== Description ==
Located at the northern end of the Spit, Main Beach, Gold Coast, Humphreys boat shed was a two storeyed timber-framed building with a central slipway.

The building comprised two rectangular, two-storeyed timber framed sections, on a concrete base, clad with fibrous cement with timber battening, located to the north and south of a two-storey volume space incorporating a concrete slipway with an entrance in the western side of the building.

Both the rectangular sections and the slipway were protected by a low-pitched gable roof. In the slipway space, the timber rafters have been pitched steep from the ceiling joists of the original building, creating the larger, open space. Some of the timber framed windows have been replaced with aluminium.

A concrete block extension, with a trussed roof, was located at the rear, or eastern side, of the boat shed and was connected by the low pitched roof, to the rest of the structure. Timber walkways were located around the building, and timber balustraded verandahs were located on the upper floor.

A flat was located on the upper level of the southern section. It comprised a number of rooms, including bedrooms, bathroom living room and kitchen. The flat retained its original fittings and furniture.

Mature vegetation, including Norfolk Island pines and Pandanus palms were located on either side of the boat shed.

== Heritage listing ==
Humphreys Boat Shed & Slipway was listed on the Queensland Heritage Register on 31 August 2001 having satisfied the following criteria.

The place is important in demonstrating the evolution or pattern of Queensland's history.

Humphreys Boat Shed, constructed in 1955, is important in illustrating aspects of the commercial and recreational boating and fishing industry in Southport, and is a now rare extant reminder of an early Gold Coast industry in an area which has undergone many changes over the past fifty years. Humphreys Boat Shed and Slipway are significant as a direct link with the past, surviving as reminders of one of the earliest activities which first brought tourists to the Gold Coast 130 years ago.

Humphreys Boat Shed has been well maintained and still demonstrates the principal characteristics of a marine workshop: concrete slipway; timber rafters pitched steep from the ceiling joists of the original building in order to create a larger, open space; and its location along the Spit.

With its marine setting and the landmark quality of the two-storey structure, Humphreys Boat Shed is important due to its aesthetic significance.

== Delisting ==
In 2011, the Heritage Act was amended to allow destroyed sites to be removed from the Queensland Heritage Register. As at 2017, five sites had been removed, including Humphreys Boat Shed, as it was demolished as part of an approved development.
