= Gold Coast Coastal Cycle Route =

Foreshoreway in Queensland, Australia

The Gold Coast Oceanway is a foreshoreway for use by pedestrians and cyclists along the Gold Coast, Queensland, Australia connecting the Point Danger lighthouse on the New South Wales and Queensland border to the Gold Coast Seaway. The network includes 36 kilometres (22 mi) of poor, medium, and high-quality pathways.

== Sections ==
The 'Gold Coast Oceanway' includes a number of different sections including

- Federation Walk 36 km–32 km
- The Spit Oceanway 32 km–31 km
- Main Beach Oceanway 31 km–30 km
- Surfers Paradise Oceanway 30 km–26 km
- Broadbeach Oceanway 26 km–24 km
- Mermaid Beach Oceanway 24 km–20 km
- Burleigh Oceanway 20 km–16 km
- Palm Beach Oceanway 16 km–11 km
- Currumbin Oceanway 11 km–8 km
- Bilinga and Tugun Oceanways 8 km–4 km
- Southern Points Oceanway (Kirra, Coolangatta, Rainbow Bay, Point Danger). 4 km–0 km

Travel times and distances for walking journeys along the Gold Coast Oceanway have been calculated.

There are viewing platforms at popular outlooks all along the Oceanway that are accessible for people with a disability and the entire route is serviced by Kinetic Gold Coast buses.

== Logo ==
Oceanway logo

The Gold Coast Oceanway logo is made up of a number of elements including

- Blue ocean waves
- Golden sand along the beaches
- Green dunes along the coast
- Cyclist (viewed from above)
- The Gold Coast Oceanway laid out as a journey alongside the dune area
- Two pedestrians of different ages (viewed from above)
- Family group moving together
- The Oceanway website for more information

== Investment program ==
The Gold Coast City Council has a program to invest into the quality and capacity of the Gold Coast Oceanway. It is already possible to enjoy walking and cycling along the full 36 kilometres (22 mi) Gold Coast Oceanway corridor from Point Danger to the Gold Coast Seaway but many sections are narrow and of low quality.

=== Mirage to Seaworld Oceanway ===
In July 2008 a new section of Oceanway pavement was completed between the Sheraton Mirage Hotel and Seaworld on The Spit.

=== Main Beach South Oceanway ===
Council will construct the Main Beach South Oceanway between Woodroffe Street and Narrowneck between February and June 2023.

=== Surfers South Oceanway ===
In November 2020, Council was consulting with the community about constructing the Oceanway between Laycock Street Surfers Paradise and First Avenue Broadbeach. In 2021, a group of beach front landowners has sought a court injunction to stop construction near their homes. The Court challenge was not successful. Council has now constructed the Surfers South Oceanway, and the Minister for Transport and Main Roads, Mark Bailey, and local divisional councillor, Darren Taylor, opened the new pathway for pedestrians and cyclists in March 2023. The Surfers South Oceanway was jointly funded by the Queensland Government under its Cycle Network Local Government Grants Program and by the City of Gold Coast.

=== Broadbeach North Oceanway ===
In June 2008, funding from the innovative Wave highrise building in Broadbeach allowed completion of the Oceanway between Kurrawa Parklands and First Avenue, Broadbeach.

=== Mermaid Beach Oceanway ===
There are wealthy residents along Hedges Avenue who do not support the construction of the Oceanway along this section of the beach. Sections of the public road reserve (Los Angeles Esplanade) have been fenced off from public access and are vegetated with turf and landscaping that incorporates public road into the private gardens for the adjoining houses. The footpath on the landward side of the houses is narrow and impeded by driveways and powerpoles.

=== Palm Beach Oceanway ===
In March 2008, works commenced on the Palm Beach Parklands including a new upgraded section of Oceanway between Lacey's Lane and Tarrabora Reserve. In 2021, the Palm Beach Oceanway was extended from Tallebudgera Drive to twenty-Third Avenue.

Houses and apartments along the central sections of Palm Beach were built further seaward than other parts of the Gold Coast. This means that the remaining dunes are regularly eroded with waves reaching the seawalls. The instability of the dunes does not leave much room to construct an Oceanway between the 11th and 21st Avenue groynes.

=== Tugun to Bilinga Oceanway ===
In July 2018, Council commenced construction of the 1.7 km missing link of the Oceanway from Tugun to Bilinga. The section of Oceanway pathway opened by Christmas 2018.

=== Southern Points Oceanway ===
In September 2008, works commenced on improving the Southern Points Oceanway between Greenmount and Bilinga. In 2009 the Oceanway was completed between Kirra Point and North Kirra and in 2010 the Oceanway was extended up to Bilinga SLSC.

== Realignment proposals ==
There are many places where a realignment of the Oceanway traffic routes from the landward side of beachfront buildings to the beachfront itself would allow a superior pavement to be constructed. Beachfront residents are concerned that opening up the public land between their houses and the beach will detract from enjoyment of their property, citing in particular CPTED and coastal erosion concerns.

=== TD23A Palm Beach Oceanway ===
Gold Coast City Council is considering proposals to invest into the quality and capacity of the Gold Coast Oceanway at northern Palm Beach. A controversial area is the TD23A Oceanway between Tallebudgera Drive and 23rd Avenue. The current route for pedestrians is along the busy Gold Coast highway. A new pavement is proposed for the dune front area. Residents who currently enjoy beach front property are concerned about CPTED. In 2009, Council resolved to put construction of this section of the Oceanway on hold due to the opposition of beachfront property owners. In 2019 Council was preparing to construct the TD23A Oceanway. This section was completed in 2021

=== FERO Flat Rock to Elephant Rock Oceanway ===
Opening up public access along the beachfront between Flat Rock and Elephant Rock (FERO) Currumbin has been debated in the community for over a decade. There has been petitions both in support and opposition to opening the public road reserve along the beach so the public can walk along the dunes. The Friends of Currumbin have been quoted in the Sun Newspaper as in support of the public's right of access to the road reserve. Local beachfront property owners are lobbying politicians to ensure the road reserve remains for their exclusive beachfront enjoyment. Opponents to public access along FERO have submitted a formal legal injunction that questions the right of local government to allow people to walk along a public road reserve. In 2010, the FERO section of Oceanway was completed as a turf walkway. This section of the Oceanway was completed as a concrete accessible path in 2019.

== Awards ==
The Gold Coast Oceanway has received a number of awards including

- 1998 Award of excellence in Environmental Planning.
- 2001 Community Safety award
- 2003 Healthy Heart award for active lifestyles
- 2004 Queensland award for the Clean Beach Challenge
- 2005 Queensland award for services to the disabled community
- 2007 Gold Coast Urban Design Awards – Helen Josephson award for innovation in Urban Design
- 2008 Featured on Getaway
