= Queensland Heritage Register =

Statutory list of heritage places in Queensland, Australia

The Queensland Heritage Register is a statutory list of places in Queensland, Australia that are protected by Queensland legislation; chiefly, the Queensland Heritage Act 1992. It is maintained by the Queensland Heritage Council. As at 5 April 2020 there are 1790 places on the Queensland Heritage Register, including the Story Bridge in Brisbane and the Ross River Meatworks Chimney in Townsville.

== Criteria ==
For a place to be entered in the register, it must be nominated and then go through a process of assessment. There are three categories for inclusion:

- State Heritage Place (the most common type of entry), e.g. the Charters Towers Courthouse
- Archaeological Place, e.g. the First Brisbane Burial Ground in the vicinity of Skew Street, Brisbane
- Protected Area, e.g. the shipwreck of SS Marloo on K'gari

=== Criteria for inclusion as a State Heritage Place ===
For inclusion as a State Heritage Place on the Queensland Heritage Register, the place must satisfy one of the following criteria:

- it shows evolutions or patterns of the history of Queensland
- it has rare, uncommon or endangered aspects of the cultural heritage of Queensland
- it contributes to an understanding of the history of Queensland
- it is a good example of a particular type of cultural place
- it is important for its aesthetics
- it shows a high standard of creative or technical achievement in its time period
- it is important to a particular community or cultural group for social, cultural or spiritual reasons
- it is associated with the life or work of important people, groups or organisations in the history of Queensland

=== Criteria for inclusion as an Archaeological Place ===
For inclusion as an Archaeological Place on the Queensland Heritage Register, the place must have the potential to contain an archaeological artefact that might yield information about the history of Queensland. If a place is already listed as a State Heritage Place, it cannot also be separately listed as an Archaeological Place.

=== Protected Areas ===
A Protected Area must be declared by regulation; there is no explicit criteria listed in the legislation, other than it be a place of great significance to cultural heritage. Entry to Protected Areas is restricted with a system of permits, affording a high level of protection.

== Format of the Register ==
An entry in the Queensland Heritage Register must include:

- location information
- the history of the place
- a description of the place
- if it is subject to a heritage agreement
- for State Heritage Places, how it meets the criteria for State Heritage Places
- for Archaeological Places, how it meets the criteria for Archaeological Places
- for Protected Areas, a statement of the significance of the cultural heritage that warrants the protection

== Removal from the heritage register ==
In 2011, the Heritage Act was amended to allow destroyed sites to be removed from the Queensland Heritage Register. As at 2017, five sites had been removed, including the Caboonbah Homestead which was destroyed in a fire and four other sites demolished as part of an approved development:

- Wheat Creek Culvert, Brisbane
- Pizzey Memorial Clock, Childers
- Humphrey's Boatshed and Slipway, Southport
- Mitchell State School (1914 Building)

== Other heritage registers ==
Places may also be entered in other lists such as the Commonwealth National Heritage List which is maintained by the Australian Heritage Council.

Under Section 113 of the Queensland Heritage Act 1992, all local government authorities in Queensland must maintain a local heritage register; the Brisbane Heritage Register is an example of a local government heritage register in Queensland.

== See also ==
- Australian Heritage Database
