= Federation Walk Coastal Reserve =

Reserve on the Gold Coast, Queensland, Australia

Coordinates: 27.950°S 153.428°E

The Federation Walk Coastal Reserve is a reserve comprising the eastern part of The Spit on the Gold Coast, Queensland, Australia. The reserve was opened on 22 June 2003, and is approximately 93 hectares in size. The area supports a subtle mix of habitats including littoral rainforest, native grasslands, and pockets of wetlands. The Federation Walk track goes throughout the reserve.

== Flora ==
- Coastal banksia (Banksia integrifolia)
- Old man banksia (Banksia serrata)
- Swamp banksia (Banksia robur)
- Beach bean (Canavalia rosea)
- Weeping bottlebrush (Callistemon viminalis)
- Dune cypress
- Dune fan flower
- Marsh fern (Cyclosorus interruptus)
- Weeping fig (Ficus benjamina)
- Beach morning glory
- Variable groundsel
- Forest red gum (Eucalyptus tereticornis)
- Red flowering gum (Corymbia ficifolia)
- Cottonwood hibiscus (Hibiscus tiliaceus)
- Native beach hibiscus (Hibiscus tiliaceus)
- Blush macaranga (Macaranga tanarius)
- Spiny-head mat-rush (Lomandra longifolia)
- Swamp oak (Casuarina glauca)
- Bangalow palm (Archontophoenix cunninghamiana)
- Cabbage-tree palm (Livistona australis)
- Pigface (Carpobrotus glaucescens)
- Knobby-club rush (Ficinia nodosa)
- She-oak (Casuarina equisetifolia)
- Tuckeroo (Cupaniopsis anacardioides)
- Coastal wattle (Acacia sophorae)

== Fauna ==
- Striped marsh frog
- Eastern sedge frog
- Green tree frog (Litoria caerulea)
- Carpet python
- Eastern water dragon

=== Birds ===
- Rainbow bee-eater
- Australian brushturkey
- Butcherbird
- Pied butcherbird
- Golden-headed cisticola
- Little black cormorant
- Pheasant coucal
- Torresian crow
- Black-faced cuckooshrike
- Bush stone-curlew
- Far Eastern curlew
- Pied currawong
- Dollarbird
- Bar-shouldered dove
- Spotted dove
- Spangled drongo
- Pacific black duck
- Little eagle
- White-bellied sea eagle
- Red-backed fairywren
- Superb fairywren
- Grey fantail
- Australasian figbird
- Double-barred finch
- Leaden flycatcher
- Noisy friarbird
- Tawny frogmouth
- Galah
- Bar-tailed godwit
- Silver gull
- Striated heron
- White-faced heron
- Blue-faced honeyeater
- Brown honeyeater
- Striped honeyeater
- Straw-necked ibis
- Sacred kingfisher
- Black-shouldered kite
- Brahminy kite
- Whistling kite
- Kookaburra
- Masked lapwing
- Rainbow lorikeet
- Scaly-breasted lorikeet
- Australian magpie
- Noisy miner
- Mistletoebird
- Scarlet myzomela
- Olive-backed oriole
- Osprey
- Australian pelican
- Australian pipit
- Double-banded plover
- Brown quail
- Buff-banded rail
- Silvereye
- Welcome swallow
- Common tern
- Greater crested tern
- Yellow-rumped thornbill
- Willie wagtail
- Whimbrel
