= Federation Walk =

Pedestrian walkway on the Queensland Gold Coast

Federation Walk is a 3.5 kilometres (2.2 mi) pedestrian walkway on the Queensland Gold Coast. It is operated as a community project that was launched through efforts of the Main Beach Progress Association and the Friends of Federation Walk to celebrate the Centenary of the Federation of Australia in 2001. It is located at the northern end of the Gold Coast Oceanway on the Southport Spit, Gold Coast in Queensland, Australia.

== History ==
The project was launched in 1999 after receipt of the Centenary of Federation Queensland grant of $75,000, the Gold Coast City Council matched that amount and the $150,000 was committed to Stage 1 construction of the Federation Walk pathway designed and surveyed by Southport Architect and Urban Planner Arnold Wolthers. On 19 March 2000, the walk was officially launched, and was attended by more than 100 people. A fig tree that currently marks the start of the walk was planted to mark the ribbon-cutting. The first stage of Federation Walk was officially opened on 21 January 2001, with more than 5,000 people in attendance and 100 trees planted. The Opening of the Federation Walk Pathway was held on 6 June 2002, with the unveiling of a large plaque at the Walk's start. Arnold Wolthers prepared and submitted to Gold Coast City Council the Land Management Plan for Federation Walk.

Although the region faced a number of challenges, due in part to the proposed construction of a cruise ship terminal, the Walk has been preserved. In 2007 the Queensland State Government committed $100,000 per year to the Federation Walk project. This amount was matched by the Gold Coast City Council and with an additional $30,000 in funds not only managed the funding but also employed a part-time Ranger specific to the Federation Walk Coastal Reserve.

== Location ==
A natural section of the area known as The Spit, the 3.5 kilometres (2.2 mi) long Federation Walk begins at a fig tree in the parking lot opposite the entrance to Sea World. The walk continues through patches of rainforest where regular community planting days are held. After leaving the Federation Walk Coastal Reserve, the walk continues under the sand bypass jetty and along the pathway to the southern training wall of the Gold Coast Seaway. The tip of the walk is at the end of the Gold Coast Oceanway.

== Support ==
Federation Walk is supported primarily by Friends of Federation Walk, a subcommittee of the Main Beach Progress Association, whose mission is to prepare a Master Plan for the regeneration of the vegetation on The Spit, create public access for passive recreation, to ensure present and future generations of the community have access to enjoy, appreciate and care for The Spit. Much of their work was undone between 2003 and 2005 when seven deliberately lit fires devastated the area and destroyed planting that had been supported by a $25,000 grant from Enviro Fund. Following the fires, a weed-a-thon was held in November 2006 to mark the receipt of a grant from the government of Queensland, which was in addition to money received from the Gold Coast City Council.

Work for the Dole and Green Corps have also been among the organisations that have supported Federation Walk.

In 2006 the state government promised $100,000 per annum towards the employment of a ranger for the Federation Walk.
