= Gold Coast Seaway =

Coordinates: 27°56′7.02″S 153°25′40.76″E

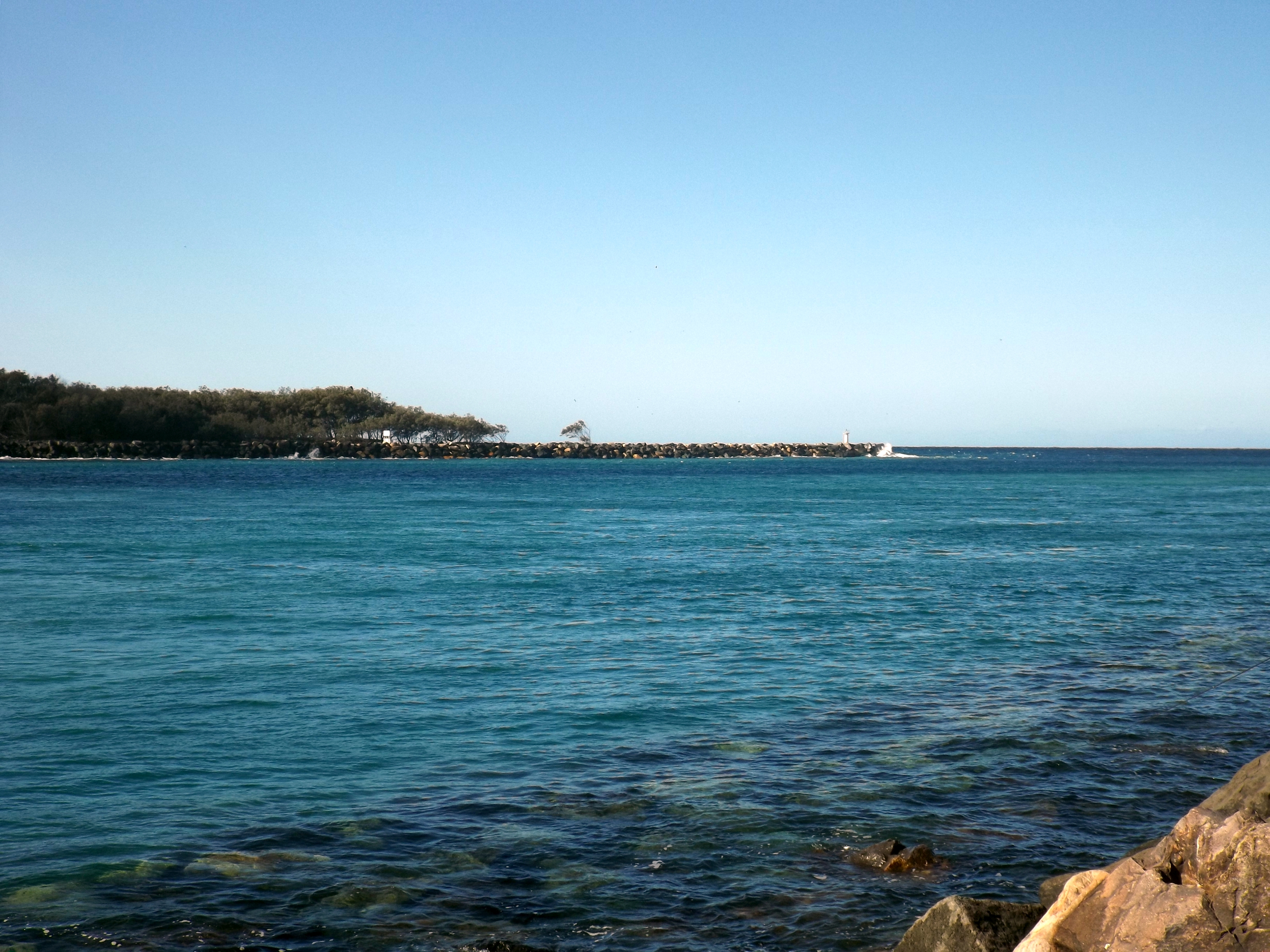
Channel in 2015

The Gold Coast Seaway or Southport Seaway is the main navigation entrance from the Pacific Ocean into the Gold Coast Broadwater and southern Moreton Bay and is one of Australia's most significant coastal engineering projects. It is located at the northern end of the Southport Spit where the Nerang River enters the Pacific Ocean via the Broadwater. The channel was constructed between 1984 and 1986, primarily to facilitate the safe passage of sea-faring vessels. The passage was previously known as the Southport Bar. The mouth of the Nerang River was once located further south in Broadbeach. The main driving force for this movement is the northward drift of sand along the coast.

Before the bypass system was implemented the mouth of the Nerang River moved northwards at a rate of 60 metres per year. This northward drift was responsible for the unstable and shifting conditions of the bar, which made crossing it hazardous for small boats. The northern end of the Gold Coast Oceanway, Federation Walk, a foreshoreway for pedestrians and cyclists, runs along the Seaway's southern training wall.

The seaway is issued regular weather forecasts by the Bureau of Meteorology.

== Design ==
Two rock walls to stabilise the position of the entrance were constructed. One million tonnes of imported rock was used. To reduce the entry of ocean swells the breakwater walls were aligned 15 degrees north of east and increasing the length of the southern wall. Models indicated that the western shores of the Broadwater would need further protection from waves. Wave Break Island was constructed from dredged material to act as a barrier.

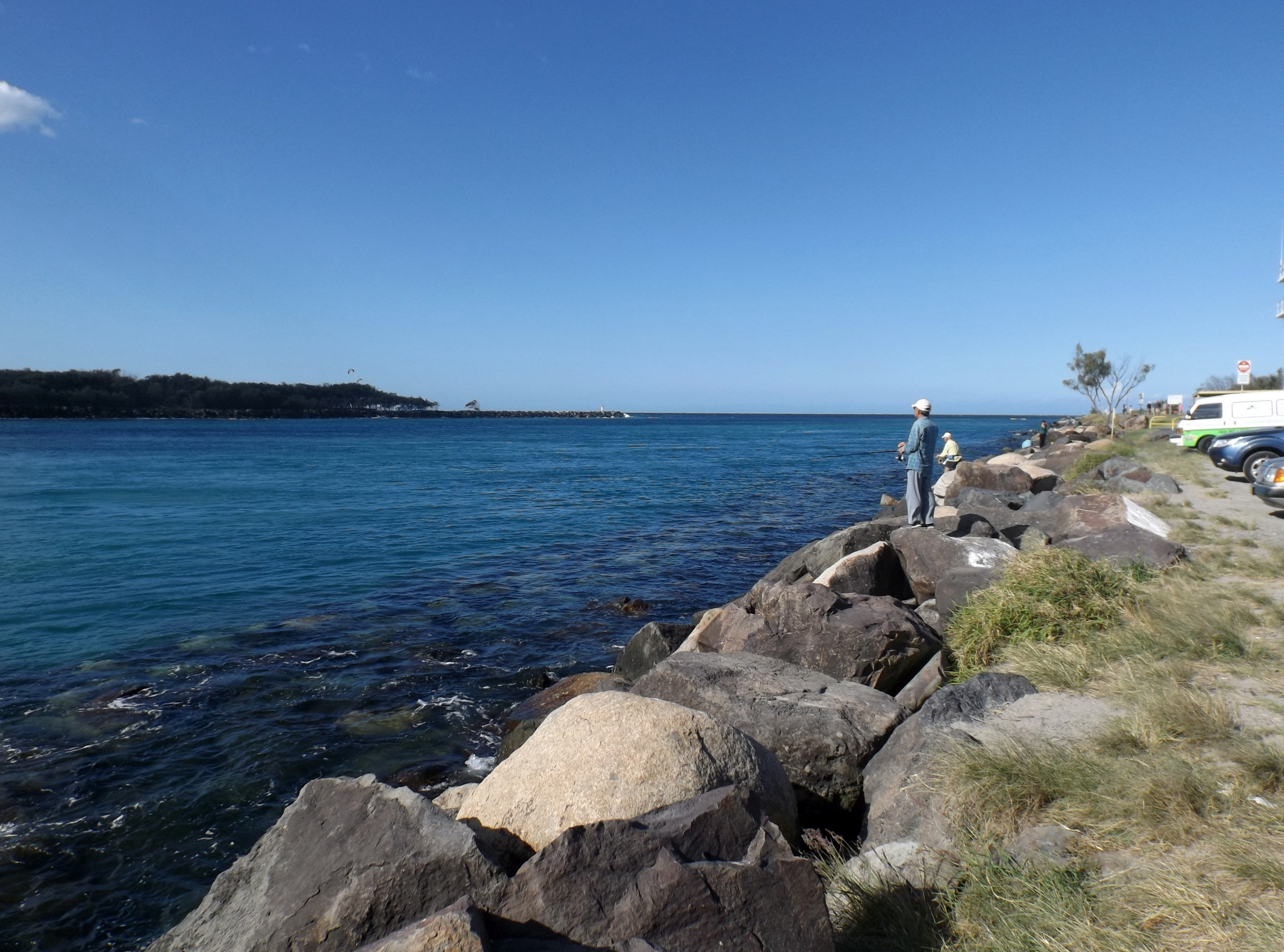
Rock wall anglers, 2015

The channel is 250 metres wide. The mean depth is 11 m and it has a maximum depth of 20 m. During outgoing tides, excess treated wastewater from four sewage treatment plants is released into the channel.

== Gold Coast Sand Bypass System ==
Research conducted by the government indicated the quantity of sand movement necessitated a solution that operated perpetually. Gold Coast Seaway is home to the world's first permanent sand bypassing system, which currently delivers all sand that arrives at the Gold Coast Seaway across the entrance and into the Moreton Bay Marine Park. Up to 500 cubic metres of sand can be moved per hour. The Gold Coast Shoreline Management Plan is reviewing this practice and examining the concept of Island welding to determine if 85% of the sand (80,000 cubic metres per year) can be sustainably recycled to Surfers Paradise.

The bypass system uses ten pumps located along the jetty. These are two metres beneath the sand. The pumps collect 500,000 cubic metres of sand over the course of a year. The sand, which is naturally moving northwards is pumped via a tunnel under the seaway to South Stradbroke Island, thereby making dredging unnecessary. It is managed by the Gold Coast Waterways Authority.

== Diving ==
Gold Coast Seaway is a popular diving and fishing location. Many surfers and body boarders regularly paddle across the seaway on their boards from the mainland to South Stradbroke Island. Popular surfing sites include the sand pumping jetty on the mainland and the sand pumping outlets on South Stradbroke Island.

In 2014, scientists from NatureServe in the US traveled to Australia to find a pipefish species first photographed by a diver in the seaway in November 2009.

== See also ==
- Southport Spit
