= Narrow Neck, Queensland =

Coordinates: 27.9865°S 153.4297°E

Narrow Neck is the name of an isthmus that separates the anabranch of the Nerang River from the Coral Sea in the City of Gold Coast, Queensland, Australia. It is also the boundary between the southern end of the suburb of Main Beach and the northern end of the suburb of Surfers Paradise.

== Seawalls ==
The highway connecting Sydney to Brisbane was constructed at Narrow Neck in 1920 and by 1921 it became necessary to build the Gold Coast's first seawall out of timber. A series of seawalls were constructed at Narrow Neck over the years including materials like car bodies, old trucks and buses filled with concrete, dumped concrete from old buildings, rocks and boulders.

After an evaluation of seawalls along the Gold Coast by Griffith Centre for Coastal Management based at Griffith University on the Gold Coast, the timber wall was upgraded in 2016 by City of Gold Coast using the standard rock seawall design for the Gold Coast. Much of the timber removed was still in good condition.

== Narrow Neck Artificial Reef ==
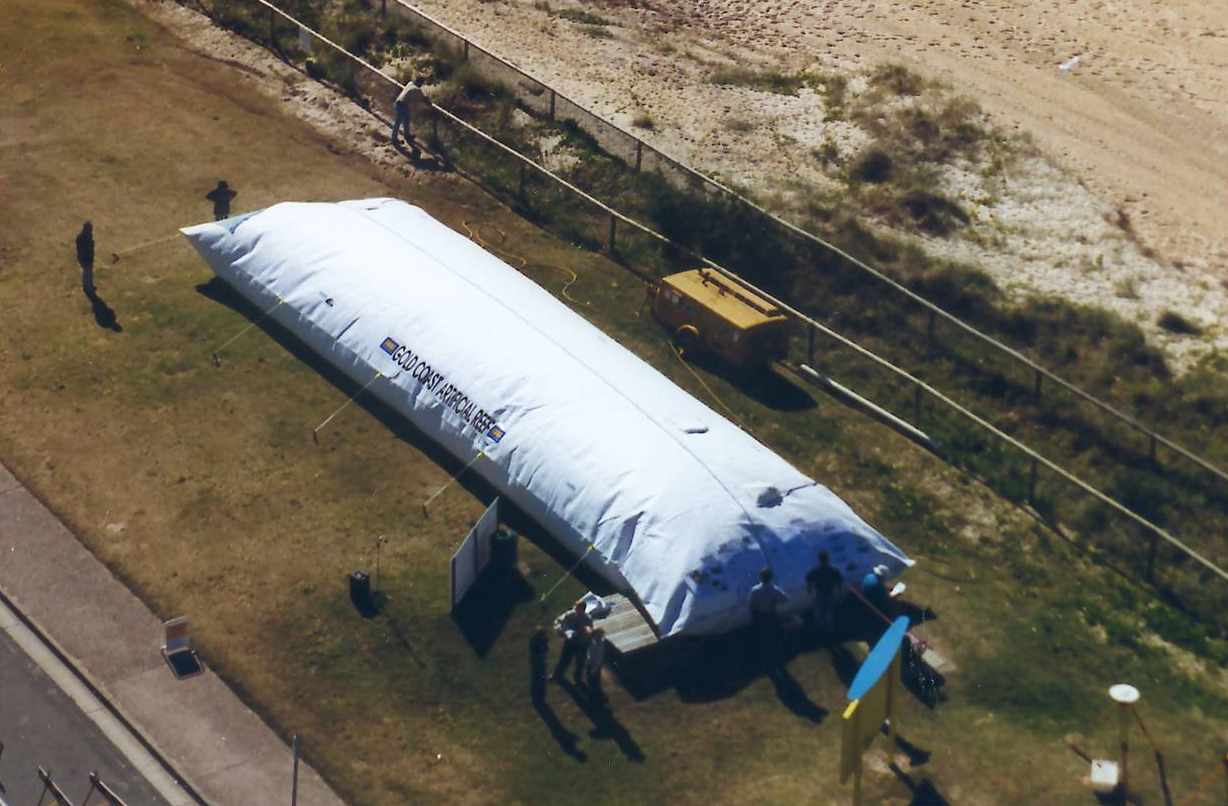
A "mega sand container" at Narrow Neck in 1999.

In 1971 the Dutch University Delft completed a report for the Queensland Government recommending the construction of a groyne at Narrow Neck. The Gold Coast City Council examined the idea of a groyne and instead constructed an artificial reef to stabilise the foreshore at Narrow Neck. So far the reef has worked well as a coastal control point, but has been disappointing in its secondary objective to improve surfing. A surprising benefit of the Narrow Neck Reef has been its ability to attract marine growth and reef fish and is now a popular diving and fishing location. Narrow Neck is particularly popular for kite surfing and longboarding.

The 350 × 600 m V-shaped artificial reef is located 200 m offshore and deflects the waves to the left and to the right of its tip. It was built from more than 400 "mega sand containers" placed between 1 and 10 m below the mean sea level. Each container was about 20 m long and 3.0–4.8 m in diameter; it was filled with up to 250 m^{3} of sand and weighed up to 500 tonnes. Its walls were made of needle-punched nonwoven geotextile, which offered much higher damage resistance compared to conventional materials. The containers were filled on the shore and installed at a rate of up to 10 per day with a GPS-positioned ship.

In June 2018, renewal works were completed in which 84 additional mega sand containers were place on top of the reef from a split hull barge.

== See also ==
- Gold Coast Broadwater
- Southport Cable Hut
