= History of the Gold Coast, Queensland =

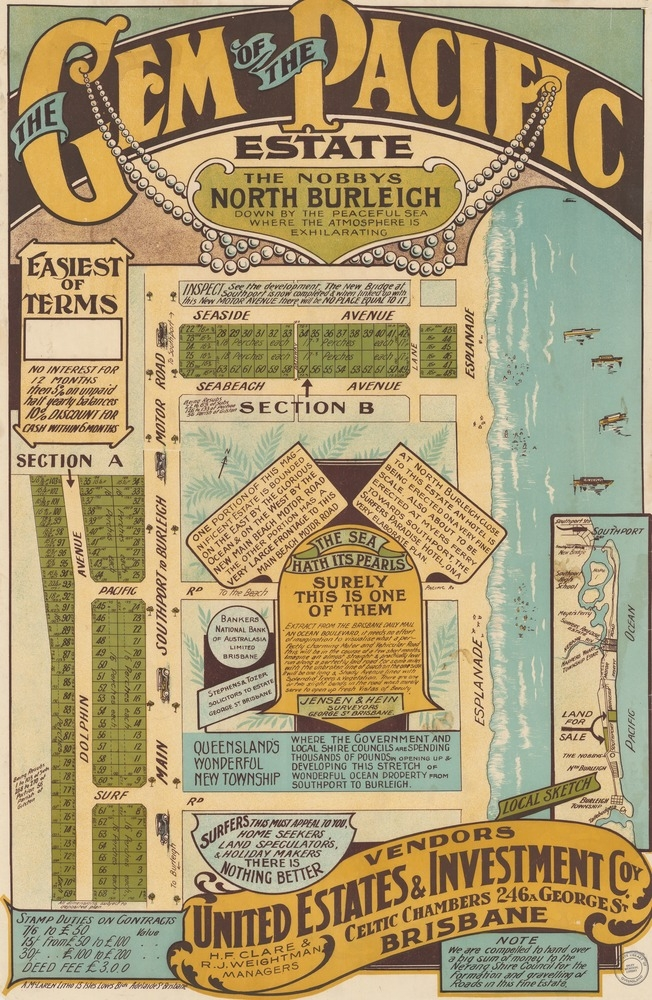
Real estate map of "Gem of the Pacific" Estate, North Burleigh, c. 1920

The history of the Gold Coast in Queensland, Australia began in prehistoric times with archaeological evidence revealing occupation of the district by indigenous Australians for at least 23,000 years. The first early European colonizers began arriving in the late 1700s, settlement soon followed throughout the 19th century, and by 1959 the town was proclaimed a city. Today, the Gold Coast is one of the fastest-growing cities in Australia.

== Kombumerri Aboriginal history in the Gold Coast region ==
Archaeological evidence suggests that Aboriginal people inhabited the Gold Coast region about 23,000 years before European settlement, and continue to live there today. By the early 18th century there were several distinct clan estate groups (previously referred to as tribes) living between the Tweed and Logan Rivers and bounded approximately in the west by the town of Beaudesert; they are believed to be: the Gugingin, Bullongin, Kombumerri, Minjingbal, Birinburra, Wangerriburra, Mununjali and Migunberri Collectively they were known as Kombumerri people and spoke the Yugambeh language, for which there was and is evidence of several distinct dialects in the region.

The historical Kombumerri people were hunters, gatherers and fishers, and are reported to have trained dingos and even dolphins to aid them in the hunting and fishing processes. Various species were targeted in various seasons, including shellfish including eugaries, (cockles or pipis), oysters and mudcrabs. In winter, large schools of finfish species "running" along the coast in close inshore waters were targeted, those being sea mullet, which were followed by a fish known as tailor. Turtles and dugong were eaten, but the latter only rarely due to their more northerly distribution. Various species of parrots and lizards were eaten along with bush honey. Echidnas, (an Australian native similar to a porcupine, but a monotreme not a rodent), are still hunted with dogs today and various marsupials including koalas and possums were also consumed. Numerous plants and plant products were included in the diet including macadamias and Bunya nuts and were used for medicinal purposes.

Unlike their neighbours to the north of the Logan river and west and south west of Beaudesert, the Kombumerri people not only spoke dialects of a different language group, but along with other members of the Y-Bj dialect chain to the south, subscribe to an originary myth known as "The Three Brothers", which is based on the arrival to this part of the eastern Australian coastline by 3 men/mythical culture heroes and their wives and children in a canoe:

Berang-ngehn gurilahbu, ngering Mumuhm, Yabirahyn or Berrungen korillåbo, ngerring Mommóm, Yaburóng Berrung came long long ago, with Mommóm (and) Yaburóng

Long ago, Berrung together with Mommóm (and) Yabúrong came to this land. They came with their wives and children in a great canoe, from an island across the sea. As they came near the shore, a woman on the land made a song that raised a storm which broke the canoe in pieces, but all the occupants, after battling with the waves, managed to swim ashore. This is how ‘the men,’ the paigål (baygal) black race, came to this land. The pieces of the canoe are to be seen to this day. If any one will throw a stone and strike a piece of the canoe, a storm will arise, and the voices of Berrúng and his boys will be heard calling to one another, amidst the roaring elements. The pieces of the canoe are certain rocks in the sea. At Ballina, Berrúng looked around and said, nyung? (nyang)and all the paigål about there say nyung to the present day. On the Tweed he said, ngando? (ngahndu)and the Tweed paigål say ngando to the present day. This is how the blacks came to have different dialects. Berrúng and his brothers came back to the Brunswick River, where he made a fire, and showed the paigål how to make fire. He taught them their laws about the kippåra, and about marriage and food. After a time, a quarrel arose, and the brothers fought and separated, Mommóm going south, Yaburóng west, and Berrúng keeping along the coast. This is how the paigål were separated into tribes.

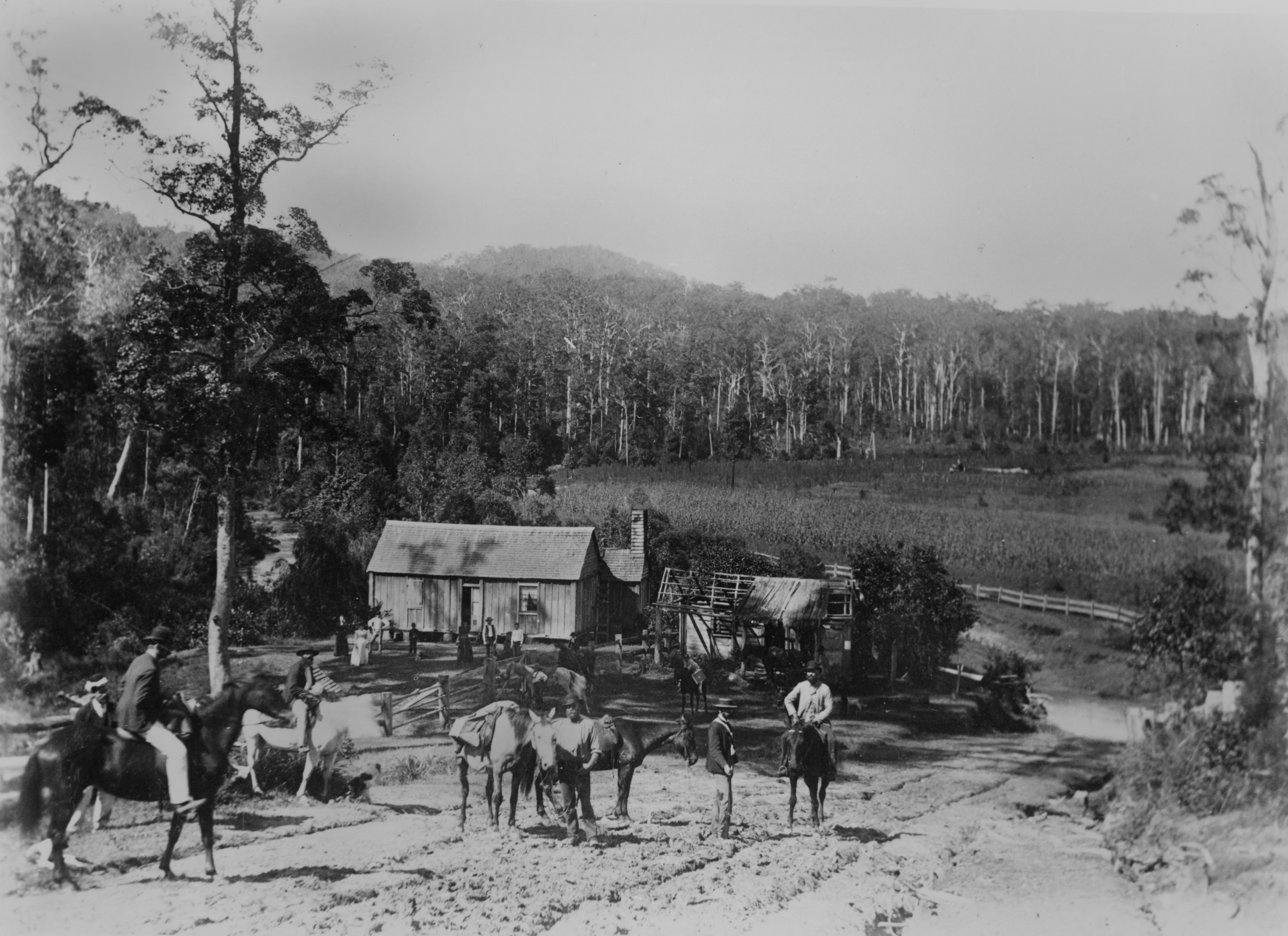
View of a farm in the Mudgeeraba district c. 1891

The area around present day Bundall, proximate to the Nerang River and Surfers Paradise, along with various other locations in the region was an established meeting place for tribes visiting from as far away as Grafton and Maryborough. Great corroborees were held there and traces of Aboriginal camps and intact bora rings are still visible in the Gold Coast and Tweed River region today, including the bora ring at the Jebribillum Bora Park at Burleigh Heads.

As Europeans settled the Gold Coast region and began farming and timber-gathering in the 19th century it was thought by some that the Kombumerri were driven from their traditional hunting, gathering and fishing grounds into the hinterland and missions and Aboriginal reserves which followed the passage of the Aboriginals Protection and Restriction of the Sale of Opium Act 1897 (61 Vic, No.17), generally cited as the 1897 Act:

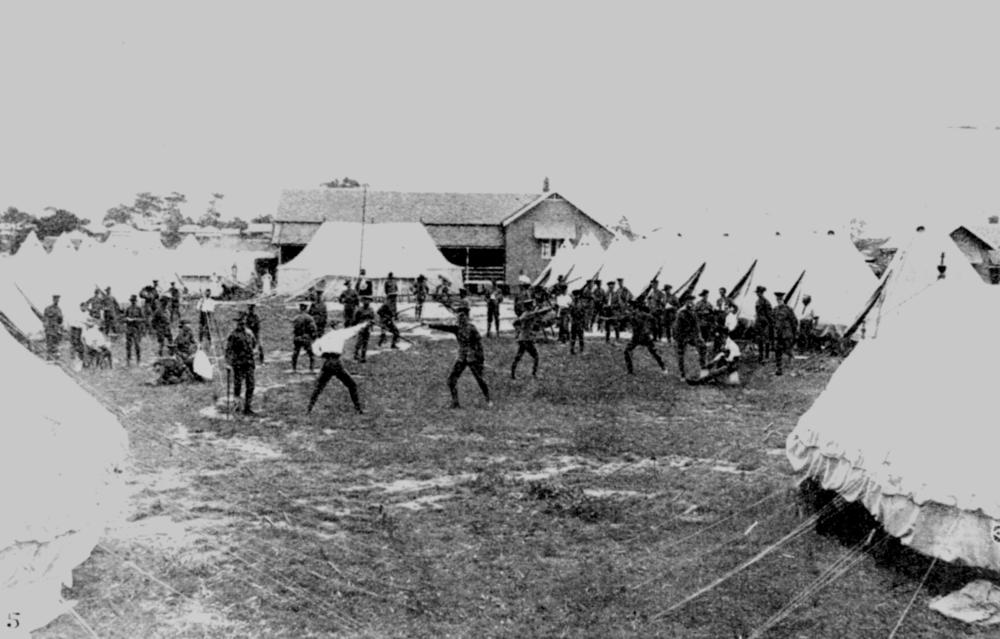
Cadet Officers' Camp in the grounds of Southport State High School c. 1907

"... (it) was the first comprehensive Aboriginal protection act in Queensland and, indeed, in Australia; it ushered in the long era of protection and segregation during which Aboriginals and Torres Strait Islanders lost their legal status as British citizens and became, in effect, wards of the state".

"Regional administrative control of the Aboriginal and Torres Strait Islander population of the State was achieved by dividing the State into Protectorates. Each Protectorate was administered by a local Protector of Aboriginals who was a police officer in all cases except for Thursday Island. The appointment of local Protectors began in 1898. Local Protectors had many responsibilities including the administration of Aboriginal employment, wages, and savings bank accounts. Local Protectors also played a significant role in the removal of Aboriginal people to reserves".

However, analyses of historical and anthropological records show that many of the Kombumerri remained in their traditional country and found employment with farmers, oyster producers and fishermen, timber cutters and mills constructed for the production of resources like sugar and arrowroot, whilst continuing to varying degrees with the Kombumerri cultural practices, laws and customs that were in evidence at the time of the arrival of the colonists. Many of them, both men and women (and sometimes children), found employment as servants or staff in the houses of the wealthy squatters and businessmen.

Due to the harshness of the 1897 Act, and the various equally draconian amendments to it in the last century, and with respect to various government administrations, Kombumerri Aboriginal people have to date maintained a relatively low political profile in the Gold Coast region so that they would not be removed from their families, or from their traditional country with which they had (and retain) strong spiritual links. As a result, and since that time, the Kombumerri people have maintained close and generally closed networks of communication amongst themselves regarding their cultural practices and use of language which were not accommodated by the authorities.

== Early European history ==
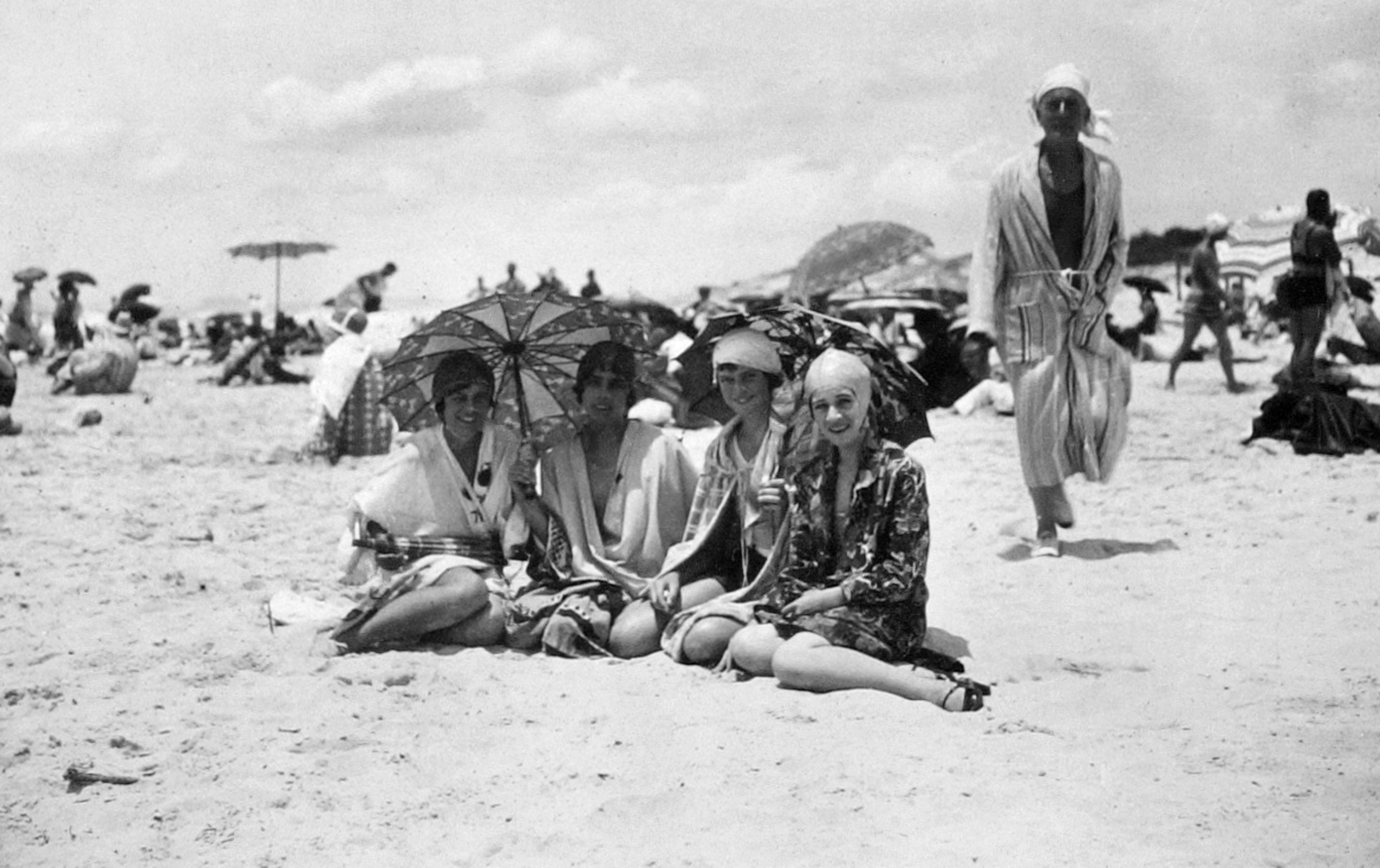
Ladies posing for a photo at Main Beach, c. 1934

English navigator Captain James Cook became the first European to visit the Gold Coast when he sailed past on 16 May 1770. As an explorer under the commission of the Royal Navy he had the foresight to name Mount Warning (a volcanic outcrop 25 kilometres (16 mi) inland) as a natural beacon for a hazardous reef off the mouth of the Tweed River near a rocky outcrop he named Point Danger. Captain Matthew Flinders, an explorer charting the continent north from the colony of New South Wales, sailed past again in 1802 but the region remained uninhabited by Europeans until 1823 when explorer John Oxley landed at Mermaid Beach, (named after his boat, a cutter called Mermaid). Despite the area's relatively early appearance on colonial maps, it wasn't until New South Wales government surveyors charted the region in 1840 that the area was really brought to the attention of European settlers.

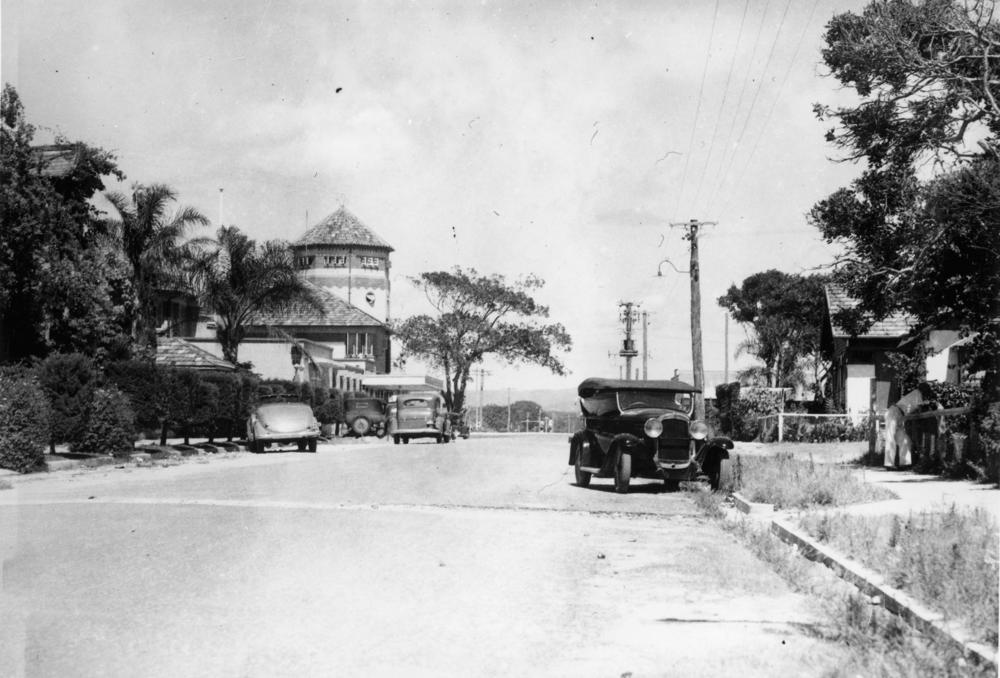
Quiet street scene in Cavill Avenue, c. 1938

The hinterland's forests of red cedar began drawing timber cutters to the region in large numbers in the mid-19th century and in 1865 the inland township of Nerang (named after the local aboriginal word neerang, meaning ‘shovel-nosed shark’) was surveyed and established as a base for the industry. The surrounding valleys and plains were quickly developed as cattle, sugar and cotton farms and by 1869 settlement had reached the mouth of the Nerang River on the Southern edge of Moreton Bay. The township of Southport was surveyed in 1875 in a location known as Nerang Creek Heads. In 1885 Queensland Governor Musgrave built a holiday home known as the 'Summer Place' on the banks of the Nerang River near Southport and the surrounding coastal area began to get a reputation as a resort for Brisbane's wealthy and influential. Summer Place remains in situ at The Southport School and serves as Biddle House, the senior school boarding house.

The rough bush tracks and numerous creek crossings be between Brisbane and Southport made it difficult to reach without a boat, but in 1889 a railway line was extended to the town and numerous guesthouses and hotels were soon established up and down the coastline.

During the 19th century many ships ran aground along the Gold Coast. One of the most famous of these shipwrecks was the Scottish Prince. Where in 1887, ""The Scottish Prince"", a 3 steel-masted iron barque 64 metres long, sank as she was sailing from Glasgow, Scotland to Brisbane with a cargo of whiskey, mousetraps, linen and other assorted cargo. The reason for it running aground, is because it is believed that the captain and many of the crew were drunk at the time. Today only the hull remains which is covered with soft corals and sponges, and is a haven for crayfish, Shovelnose rays, Leopard and wobbegong sharks, and other tropical fish.

The permanent population of the region increased slowly until 1925 when a new coastal road was built between Brisbane and Southport. That same year, Jim Cavill built the Surfers Paradise hotel 2 kilometres (1.2 mi) south of Southport in an area between the Nerang River and the beach known as Elston, and the real tourism boom began.

As automobile technology became more and more reliable in the 1930s, the number of holiday makers traveling down the coast road from Brisbane increased, and by 1935 most of the coastal strip between Southport and the New South Wales border had been developed with housing estates and hotels. Elston residents successfully lobbied to change the name of their town to Surfers Paradise in 1933. The Surfers Paradise hotel burnt down in 1936 and was quickly replaced with another much grander structure, which had Art Deco styling and even included a zoo; complete with kangaroos and other wildlife.

== The Gold Coast during the Second World War ==
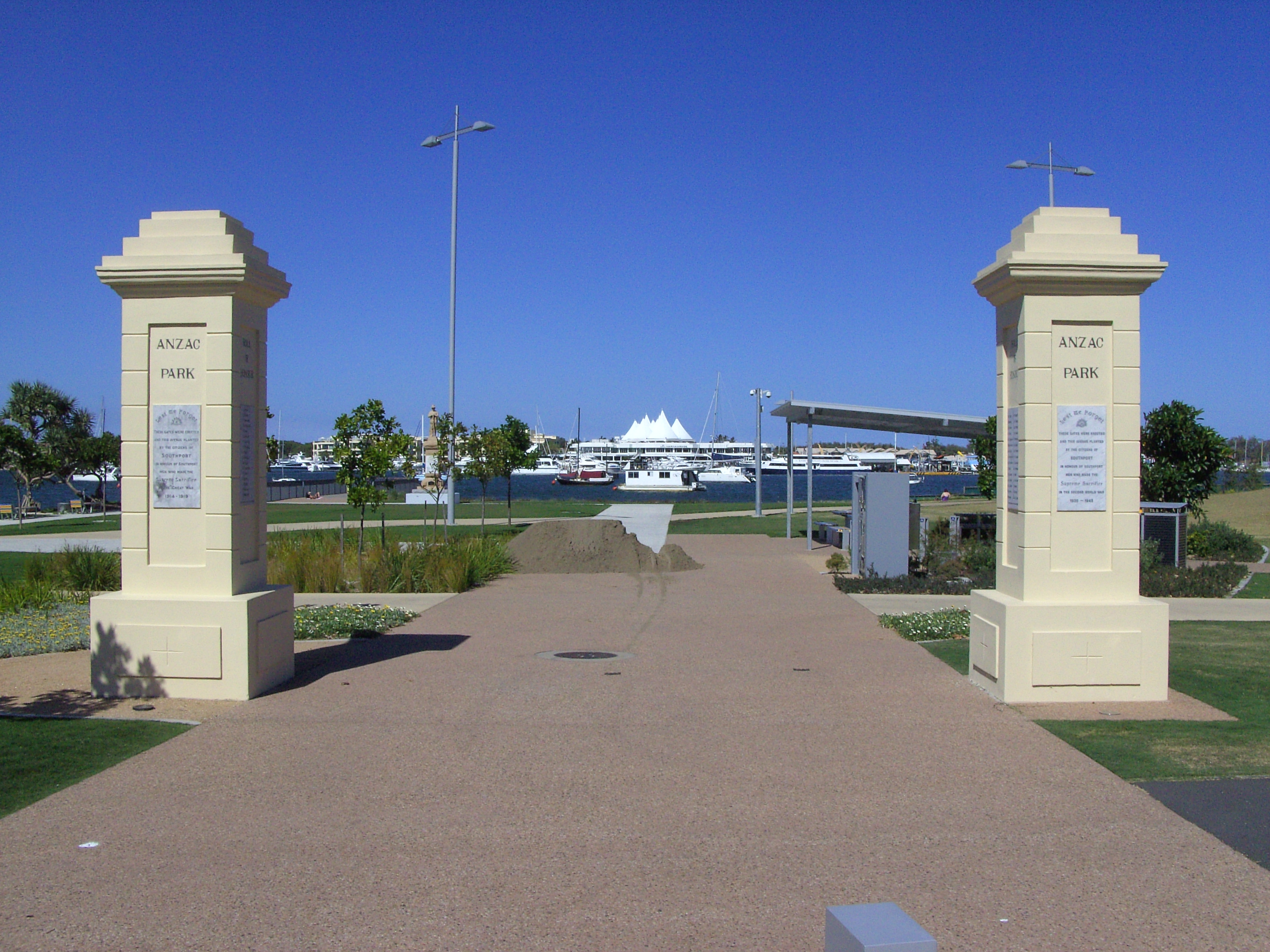
ANZAC Memorial park in Southport.

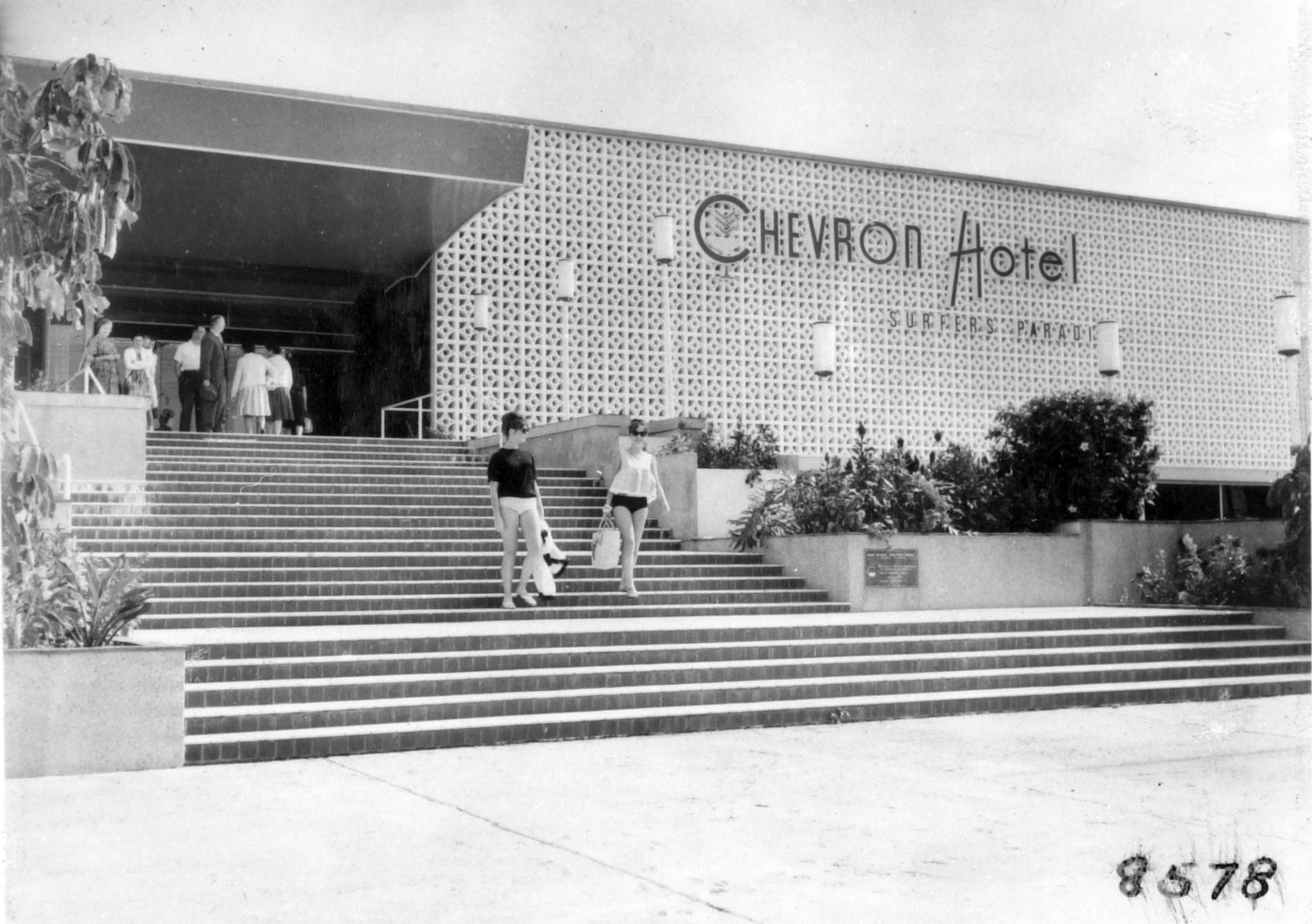
Birth of the "Glitter Strip": beginning in the 1950s the city exploded with new developments, such as the Chevron Hotel that opened in 1957.

Although the Gold Coast was not attacked by a foreign power in the Second World War, the war itself had a dramatic impact as well as most other coastal towns. It was in 1942, when the Americans began arriving. They commandeered the beach area at Coolangatta to establish rest areas. The Coolangatta Rest Area included five rest camps for Enlisted Men, and two hotels specifically for submariners. Camp No. 1 was located at Kirra Beach, along the foreshore north of Musgrave Street, in today's Roughton Park. Huts, ablutions and latrines, a kitchen/mess and an Officer's quarters and sick bay were located between the intersection with Winston Street and Lord Street, as well as down the east side of Lord Street. Camp No. 2 was at Kirra Hill, while Camp No. 3 was on Marine Parade at Coolangatta Beach. Camp No. 4 was located at Greenmount, and Camp No. 5 was at Greenmount Hill. The latter camp was located in today's Pat Fagan Park, to the north of Marine Parade. Camp No. 5 included five huts divided into 10 single cabins, a mess and recreation room, ablutions and latrines.

The Royal Australian Air Force also operated an alighting area for flying boats at Southport Broadwater during World War II; however, it is not known whether any particular on-shore installations were constructed as distinct from possibly floating moored pontoon landing structures.

== Post-war years and the birth of the name Gold Coast ==
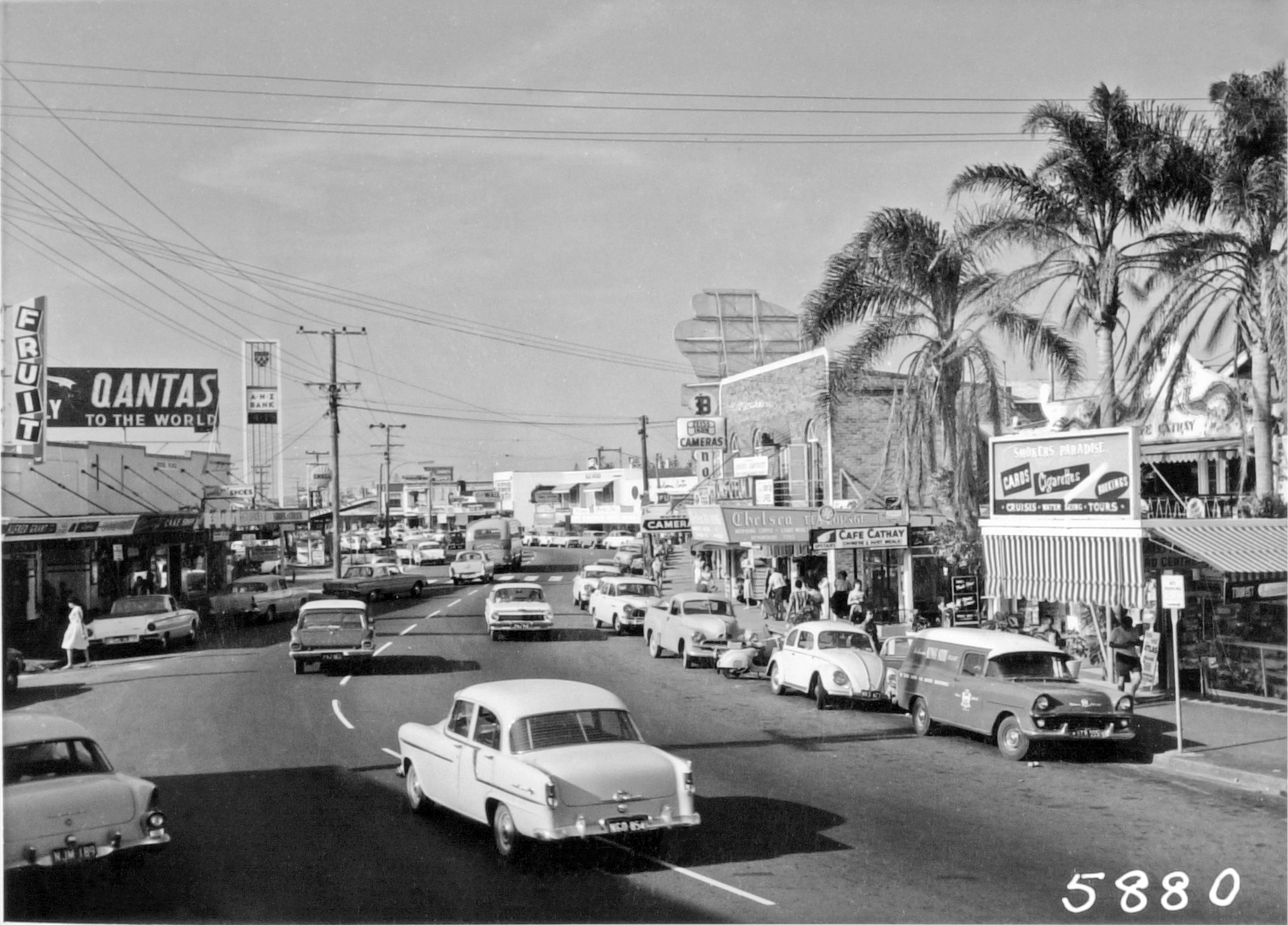
Cars on Gold Coast Highway in January 1963

The South Coast region was a very popular holiday destination for servicemen returning from World War II. However, inflated prices for real estate and other goods and services led to the nickname of "Gold Coast" from 1950. South Coast locals initially considered the name "Gold Coast" derogatory. However, soon the "Gold Coast" simply became a convenient way to refer to the holiday strip from Southport to Coolangatta. As the tourism industry grew into the 1950s, local businesses began to adopt the term in their names, and on 23 October 1958 the South Coast Town Council was renamed "Gold Coast Town Council". The area was proclaimed a city less than one year later.

Specific Gold Coast areas became the holiday destinations for many who lived inland. Coolangatta had a caravan and camping park on the New South Wales border and numerous families from Ipswich spent their Christmas holidays there. In later times, many holiday rental flats sprung up in the area. The Ipswich roots remain as the Currumbin Lifesavers, share with a similar Ipswich swimming club the title 'Vikings'. Many Vikings swimming club members joined the life saving squads at Currumbin during the holiday periods. Direct flights from Sydney to Coolangatta began in 1956.

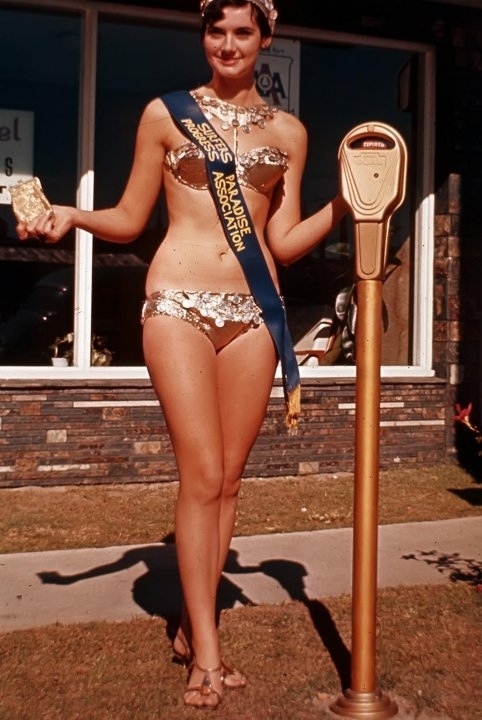
The city's famous Meter Maids service was founded in 1965 by Bernie Elsey

The first town planning on the Gold Coast began with the 1953 South Coast Planning Scheme. It featured height controls that restricted development towards strategic nodes. By the 1960s the Gold Coast's infrastructure had grown considerably, and the local building industry was able to support the development of high-rise holiday apartments and hotels (the first of which, Kinkabool, was completed in 1959). Surfers Paradise had firmly established itself as the leading destination; and the introduction of bikini-clad meter maids in 1965 to feed parking meters by the beach (to prevent holiday makers from getting parking fines) was a particularly popular innovation. In 1965, the Water Ski World Championships were held at the Surfers Paradise Ski Gardens, now known as Sea World. This was the first international event held on the coast.

The hi-rise boom continued in earnest during the 1970s and by the time the Gold Coast Airport terminal opened in Coolangatta in 1981, the region had become Australia's most well-known family holiday destination and much of the vacant land within 10 kilometres (6.2 mi) of the coast had been developed. Japanese property investment during the 1980s made the skyline soar, and the construction of modern theme parks including Dreamworld, Sea World, Warner Bros. Movie World and Wet'n'Wild Water World confirmed the Gold Coast's reputation as an international tourist centre.

Some unethical business practices and State Government corruption during the late 1980s tainted the Coast's reputation as a place of business, and property marketeering (seminars which duped interstate and overseas investors into paying premium prices for new Gold Coast property developments) during the 1990s did little to help the region's image.

In 1994, Queensland Local Government Commissioner, Greg Hoffmann began reviewing the local government boundaries in the Gold Coast, Albert and Beaudesert areas. After public debate, the 'Local Government (Albert, Beaudesert and Gold Coast) Regulation 1994' provided for the amalgamation of Gold Coast City Council and the Shire of Albert to create a new local authority called the City of Gold Coast Council. An election was held on 11 March 1995 and the first Council meeting was held on 24 March 1995.

== 21st century ==
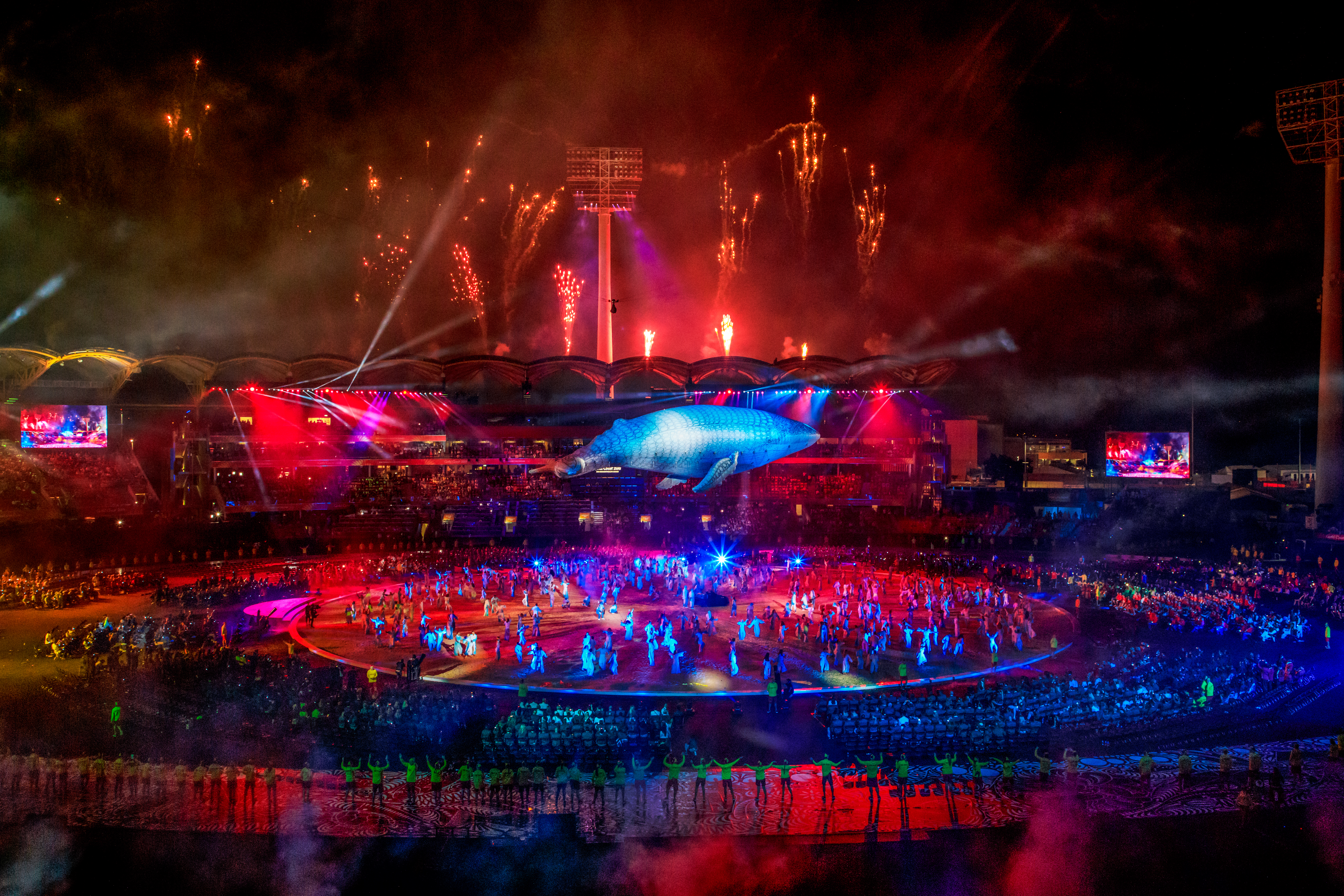
The opening ceremony of the 2018 Commonwealth Games

By the turn of the 21st century the Gold Coast had shrugged off its shady past and fully embraced the real estate boom. This boom reached its physical, and economical peak in 2005 with the opening of the 322.5m 'Worlds Tallest Residential Tower' Q1, in Surfers Paradise.

In September 2010 the Gold Coast Native Title Claim QUD346/06 was registered by the Registrar of the National Native Title Tribunal (NNTT). This administrative decision was made under the Australian Federal Government's Native Title Act 1993 which is administered by the Federal Court of Australia. A registered claim entered on the Tribunal's Register of Claims, means that in all matters which may affect the claimants' native title rights and interests in the claim area, and under the procedural rights afforded by the Native Title Act, consultation and often negotiation with the claim group is required. Jabree Limited on behalf of the claim group is the registered cultural heritage body. Yugambeh people are now recognised as significant stakeholders in the Gold Coast region.

== Notable historical figures ==
- James Cavill, first Gold Coast hotelier
- Eddie Kornhauser, Gold Coast property developer and owner of Surfers Paradise Hotel
- Russ Hinze, influential and controversial Queensland politician
- Annette Kellerman, Female swimming pioneer
- Johan Meyer, owner of the Meyer's Ferry and the Main Beach Hotel
- Sir Bruce Small, businessman, property developer, mayor of the Gold Coast

== See also ==
- History of Queensland
- Timeline of Gold Coast, Queensland

== Bibliography ==
- Steele, J.G. (1983). Aboriginal Pathways in Southeast Queensland and the Richmond River. U.Q.P.: University of Queensland Press.
- O'Connor, Rory (1997). The Kombumerri: Aboriginal people of the Gold Coast: ngulli yahnbai gulli bahn bugal bugalehn: we are still here. Self Published.
- Barlow, Alex (1997). Kombumerri – saltwater people. Reed.
- "Gold Coast City Council". History. Archived from the original on 25 March 2012.
