= History of Gold Coast =

History of Gold Coast may refer to:

- History of Gold Coast, Queensland
- History of Gold Coast (British colony)
