= Ipswich Rugby League =

Rugby league football competition

Rugby League Ipswich
- Current season or competition: 2025 Rugby League Ipswich Season
- Sport: Rugby league
- Formerly known as: Ipswich Rugby League (IRL)
- Instituted: 1910; 116 years ago
- Inaugural season: 1910
- Number of teams: 13
- Country: Ipswich, Queensland, Australia
- Premiers: North Ipswich Tigers (2026)
- Most titles: Ipswich Brothers Leprechauns (29 titles)
- Website: www.rugbyleagueipswich.com.au
- Related competition: Queensland Cup

The Ipswich Rugby League is a rugby league football competition based in Ipswich, Queensland, Australia. It is under the administration of the Queensland Rugby League through the South East Queensland Division, which also administers the Brisbane and Gold Coast competitions.

== Representative team ==
Selected players from the Ipswich Rugby League, represented Ipswich in a representative side called Combined Ipswich, also called Ipswich Diggers, whose teams compete in the statewide competitions the Cyril Connell Cup and the Mal Meninga Cup.

== Ipswich Rugby League Club Teams ==
The Ipswich Rugby League currently has 14 clubs, for senior and junior. All clubs are in the junior division aside from the Ipswich Jets, but not all are in the senior division.

The clubs currently in the senior division include:

- Fassifern Bombers
- Ipswich Jets
- Karalee Tornadoes
- Goodna Eagles
- Ipswich Brothers Leprechauns
- Swifts Bluebirds
- North Ipswich Tigers
- Rosewood Roosters
- West End Bulldogs
- Laidley Lions
- Redbank Plains Bears
- Springfield Panthers

These clubs are currently fielding teams just in the junior division, however, some have fielded senior teams in the past:

- Brisbane Valley Bulls
- Lowood Stags

Previous clubs in the league include Tivoli, the Eastern Suburbs Cobras, Boonah Rabbitohs, South Burnett Eagles and Gatton Hawks; the latter now competing in the Toowoomba Rugby League.

Colours	Club	Nickname	Founded	Homeground	Suburb	Seniors	Juniors
	Brisbane Valley	Bulls	1962	RJ Rashford Recreation Ground	Esk	No	Yes
	Fassifern	Bombers	1975	Hayes Oval	Harrisville	Yes	Yes
	Goodna	Eagles	1912	Richardson Park	Goodna	Yes	Yes
	Ipswich Brothers	Leprechauns	1914	Blue Ribbon Motors Field Wildey St.	Raceview	Yes	Yes
	Ipswich	Jets	1982	North Ipswich Reserve	North Ipswich	Yes	No
	Karalee	Tornadoes	1994	Bluegum Reserve	Karalee	Yes	Yes
	Laidley	Lions	1976	Laidley Recreation Reserve	Laidley	Yes	Yes
	Lowood	Stags	1991	Lowood Recreational Reserve	Lowood	No	Yes
	North Ipswich	Tigers	1971	Keith Sternberg Oval	North Ipswich	Yes	Yes
	Redbank Plains	Bears	1986	Redbank Plains Recreational Reserve	Redbank Plains	Yes	Yes
	Rosewood	Roosters	1977	Anzac Oval	Rosewood	Yes	Yes
	Springfield	Panthers	1998	Bob Gibbs Park	Springfield	Yes	Yes
	Swifts	Swifts Bluebirds	1919	Fernbrook Reserve	Redbank	Yes	Yes
	West End	Bulldogs	1914	Daniel's Park	Basin Pocket	Yes	Yes

== Senior Division ==
Colours	Club	Nickname	Founded	Homeground	Suburb
	Fassifern	Bombers	1975	Hayes Oval	Harrisville
	Ipswich Brothers	Leprechauns	1914	Blue Ribbon Motors Field Wildey St.	Raceview
	Laidley	Lions	1976	Laidley Recreation Reserve	Laidley
	North Ipswich	Tigers	1971	Keith Sternberg Oval	North Ipswich
	Redbank Plains	Bears	1986	Redbank Plains Recreational Reserve	Redbank Plains
	Rosewood	Roosters	1977	Anzac Oval	Rosewood
	Springfield	Panthers	1998	Bob Gibbs Park	Springfield
	Ipswich Swifts	Swifts Bluebirds	1919	N/A	Purga
	West End	Bulldogs	1914	Daniel's Park	Basin Pocket

== Junior Division ==
Colours	Club	Nickname	Founded	Homeground	Suburb
	Brisbane Valley	Bulls	1962	RJ Rashford Recreation Ground	Esk
	Fassifern	Bombers	1975	Hayes Oval	Harrisville
	Goodna	Eagles	1912	Richardson Park	Goodna
	Ipswich Brothers	Leprechauns	1914	Blue Ribbon Motors Field Wildey St.	Raceview
	Karalee	Tornadoes	1994	Bluegum Reserve	Karalee
	Laidley	Lions	1976	Laidley Recreation Reserve	Laidley
	Lowood	Stags	1991	Lowood Recreational Reserve	Lowood
	North Ipswich	Tigers	1971	Keith Sternberg Oval	North Ipswich
	Redbank Plains	Bears	1986	Redbank Plains Recreational Reserve	Redbank Plains
	Rosewood	Roosters	1977	Anzac Oval	Rosewood
	Springfield	Panthers	1998	Bob Gibbs Park	Springfield
	Ipswich Swifts	Swifts Bluebirds	1919	N/A	Purga
	West End	Bulldogs	1914	Daniel's Park	Basin Pocket

== Seasons ==
=== Premiership winners ===
Season	Grand Final Information				Minor Premiers
Season	Premiers	Score	Runners-up	Report	Minor Premiers
1980	North Ipswich Tigers	18 – 5	Goodna Eagles		North Ipswich Tigers
1981	Booval Swifts	9 – 7	Goodna Eagles		North Ipswich Tigers
1982	North Ipswich Tigers	18 – 10	Gatton Hawks		North Ipswich Tigers
1983	Gatton Hawks	32 – 8	Ipswich Brothers Leprechauns		Ipswich Brothers Leprechauns
1984	Gatton Hawks	13 – 0	West End Bulldogs		
1985	Gatton Hawks	18 – 14	Ipswich Brothers Leprechauns		Goodna Eagles
1986	Ipswich Brothers Leprechauns	20 – 8	North Ipswich Tigers		Ipswich Brothers Leprechauns
1987	North Ipswich Tigers	24 – 18	Ipswich Brothers Leprechauns		North Ipswich Tigers
1988	West End Bulldogs	35 – 14	Goodna Eagles		
1989	Goodna Eagles	20 – 12	Fassifern Bombers		
1990	West End Bulldogs	19 – 18	Booval Swifts		
1991	Booval Swifts	41 – 16	Ipswich Brothers Leprechauns		Booval Swifts
1992	North Ipswich Tigers	24 – 14	West End Bulldogs		North Ipswich Tigers
1993	Ipswich Brothers Leprechauns	34 – 22	Booval Swifts		Ipswich Brothers Leprechauns
1994	North Ipswich Tigers	44 – 8	Ipswich Brothers Leprechauns		North Ipswich Tigers
1995	North Ipswich Tigers	22 – 10	Ipswich Brothers Leprechauns		
1996	Booval Swifts	16 – 12	Redbank Plains		
1997	Booval Swifts	38 – 6	Fassifern Bombers		
1998	Ipswich Brothers Leprechauns	38 – 10	Booval Swifts		Ipswich Brothers Leprechauns
1999	Ipswich Brothers Leprechauns	38 – 10	Booval Swifts		Ipswich Brothers Leprechauns
2000	Ipswich Brothers Leprechauns	17 – 15	West End Bulldogs		Ipswich Brothers Leprechauns
2001	Ipswich Brothers Leprechauns	24 – 12	Fassifern Bombers		Ipswich Brothers Leprechauns
2002	Booval Swifts	18 – 12	Ipswich Brothers Leprechauns		Booval Swifts
2003	Goodna Eagles	33 – 12	Fassifern Bombers		West End Bulldogs
2004	Goodna Eagles	40 – 24	Booval Swifts		Goodna Eagles
2005	Goodna Eagles	36 – 18	Booval Swifts		Goodna Eagles
2006	Ipswich Brothers Leprechauns	32 – 18	North Ipswich Tigers		Ipswich Brothers Leprechauns
2007	Ipswich Brothers Leprechauns	40 – 16	South Burnett Eagles		Goodna Eagles
2008	Ipswich Brothers Leprechauns	34 – 24	Goodna Eagles		Ipswich Brothers Leprechauns
2009	Ipswich Brothers Leprechauns	35 – 22	Goodna Eagles		Goodna Eagles
2010	Booval Swifts	30 – 18	Ipswich Brothers Leprechauns		Booval Swifts
2011	Ipswich Brothers Leprechauns	4 – 16	Fassifern Bombers	QT	Ipswich Brothers Leprechauns
2012	Fassifern Bombers	30 – 22	Ipswich Brothers Leprechauns	QT	Ipswich Brothers Leprechauns
2013	Ipswich Brothers Leprechauns	32 – 24	Goodna Eagles	QT	Ipswich Brothers Leprechauns
2014	North Ipswich Tigers	42 – 16	Ipswich Brothers Leprechauns		Ipswich Brothers Leprechauns
2015	North Ipswich Tigers	24 – 22	Ipswich Brothers Leprechauns		Goodna Eagles
2016	Goodna Eagles	30 – 18	Ipswich Brothers Leprechauns	YT	Goodna Eagles
2017	Goodna Eagles	32 – 14	Fassifern Bombers	PMH	Fassifern Bombers
2018	Fassifern Bombers	32 – 10	North Ipswich Tigers	PMH	
2019	Ipswich Brothers Leprechauns	35 – 10	Ipswich Swifts		Ipswich Brothers Leprechauns
2020	Season cancelled due to COVID-19				
2021	Ipswich Swifts	42 – 22	Ipswich Brothers Leprechauns		Ipswich Swifts
2022	Ipswich Brothers Leprechauns	24 – 20	Ipswich Swifts		Ipswich Swifts
2023	Redbank Plains Bears	42 – 12	Fassifern Bombers		Redbank Plains Bears
2024	Ipswich Brothers Leprechauns	40 – 24	Redbank Plains Bears		Ipswich Brothers Leprechauns
2025	Redbank Plains Bears	28 – 24	Ipswich Jets		Redbank Plains Bears
2026	North Ipswich Tigers	28 – 24	Fassifern Bombers		Fassifern Bombers

== See also ==
- Rugby League Competitions in Australia

== External links and Sources ==
- Official website
- Rugby League Week at State Library of NSW Research and Collections
- Ipswich Rugby League : Senior A Grade Premiers 1910-2009, Compiled by J.E. Christison, 2010, ISBN 9780980607413.
- The centenary of the greatest game under the sun : one hundred years of Rugby League in Queensland, Prof. Maxwell Howell, Celebrity Books, 2008.
