= Eastern Cobras =

Australian rugby league team

Eastern Suburbs Cobras, known as the Eastern Cobras, are an Australian rugby league team based in Miami, Queensland that competed in the Ipswich Rugby League Premiership.
