= Miami, Queensland =

Miami
- Suburb
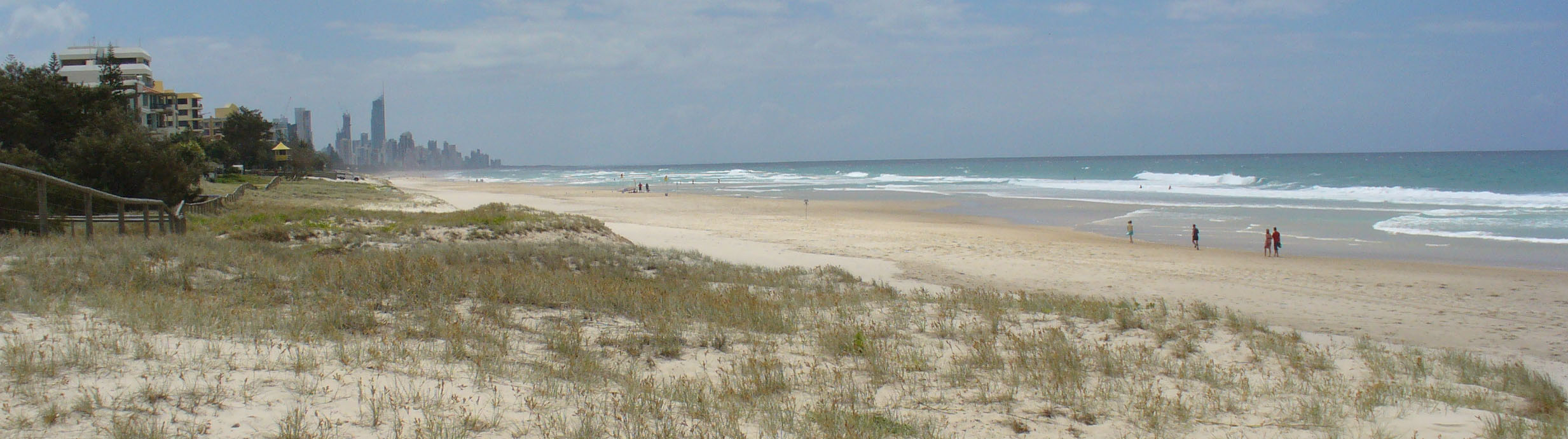
- Nobby Beach at Miami, looking north towards Surfers Paradise

- Interactive map of Miami
- Coordinates: 28.0675°S 153.4366°E
- Country: Australia
- State: Queensland
- City: Gold Coast
- LGA: City of Gold Coast (Division 12)
- Location: 8.5 km (5.3 mi) S of Surfers Paradise; 12.3 km (7.6 mi) S of Southport; 15.4 km (9.6 mi) NNW of Coolangatta; 17.4 km (10.8 mi) NNW of Tweed Heads; 91.1 km (56.6 mi) SSE of Brisbane
- Established: 1920s

Government
  - State electorates: Mermaid Beach; Burleigh
  - Federal division: Moncrieff

Area
  - Total: 3.0 km^{2} (1.2 sq mi)
- Elevation: 7 m (23 ft)

Population
  - Total: 7,445 (2021 census)
  - Density: 2,480/km^{2} (6,430/sq mi)
- Time zone: UTC+10:00 (AEST)
- Postcode: 4220
Suburbs around Miami
Mermaid Waters	Mermaid Beach	Coral Sea
Robina	Miami	Coral Sea
Burleigh Waters	Burleigh Heads	Coral Sea

Miami is a coastal suburb in the City of Gold Coast, Queensland, Australia. In the 2021 census, Miami had a population of 7,445 people.

== Geography ==
Miami is located along the Gold Coast Highway, 9 kilometres (5.6 mi) south of Surfers Paradise and 17 kilometres (11 mi) north of the Queensland / New South Wales border at Coolangatta/Tweed Heads.

The town of North Burleigh is located within the suburb (28.0652°S 153.4427°E).

Miami has the following mountains:

- North Nobby (28.0619°S 153.4406°E) 46 metres (151 ft)
- South Nobby (Little Burleigh) (28.0721°S 153.4465°E) 7 metres (23 ft)

Miami has the following beaches:

- Nobby Beach (28.0618°S 153.4431°E) extending north to Mermaid Beach
- Miami Beach (28.0695°S 153.4453°E)
- North Burleigh Beach (28.0748°S 153.4472°E) extending south to Burleigh Heads

Its commercial activity is mainly confined to the Gold Coast Highway and there is some light industry around Christine Avenue.

The Gold Coast Highway runs north to south through Miami, with Christine Avenue and Pacific Avenue connecting to the west.

== History ==
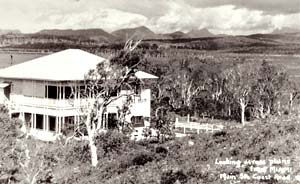
Miami Swamp next to Hotel Miami, 1935

The history of Miami can be dated back to the early 1920s when prospective investors were looking over plans for a new real estate development called Miami Shore at North Burleigh. The name "Miami Shore" was chosen as a reference to Miami Shores, Florida. The investors built their wooden or fibro bungalows on estates such as this, or rented their cottages to holiday makers. They could also stay in the Hotel Miami which opened in 1925 by E. H. Berry. In 1953, tennis courts were constructed. Pizzey Park Sporting Complex was established on 60 hectares (150 acres) in 1969.

Burleigh State High School opened on 1 January 1963. It was subsequently renamed South Coast District State High School and then to Miami State High School. Because there was a visible rock face remaining from an earlier quarry, the school principal William Callinan covered it up with a set of huge yellow letters saying "HI MIAMI HIGH". It now says just "MIAMI HIGH".

On Sunday 22 December 1963, Calvary Memorial Catholic Church was officially opened and dedicated by Archbishop James Duhig. It commemorates those who served in the Korean War.

Miami State School opened on 30 January 1979; it is now within the suburb boundaries of Mermaid Waters.

In 1988, Australian musician John Farnham's music video for the top-10 song "Two Strong Hearts" was filmed outside the famous "Miami Ice" factory at 2015 Gold Coast Highway.

== Demographics ==
Proportion of Population (2003)
Age	Suburb of Miami	Queensland Average
Up to 14 years	13.6%	20.8%
15 to 44 years	45.6%	43.4%
45 to 64 years	24.8%	24.0%
65 years plus	16.0%	11.9%

In the 2016 census, Miami had a population of 6,843 people.

In the 2021 census, Miami had a population of 7,445 people.

== Heritage listings ==
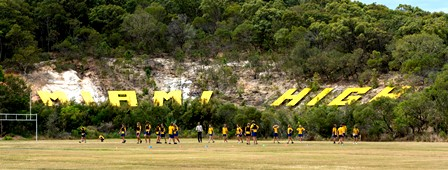
Miami State High School sign, 2015

Miami has a number of heritage sites, including:

- Miami State High School Sign, 2171 Gold Coast Highway (28.0633°S 153.4406°E)

== Education ==
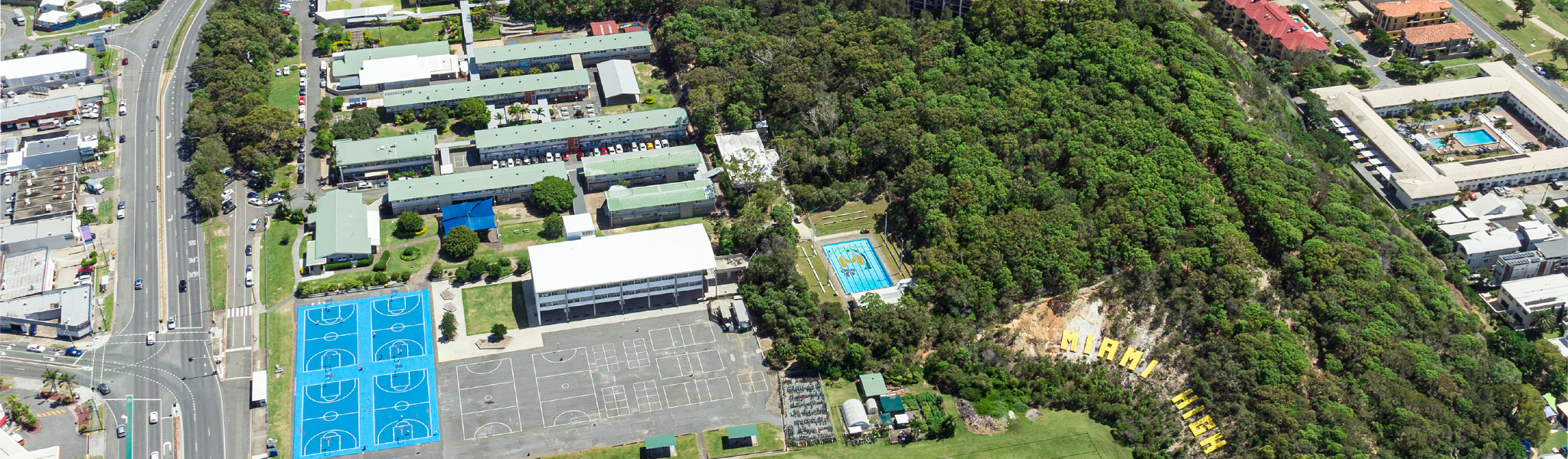
Aerial view of Miami State High School, 2020

Miami State High School is a government secondary (7–12) school for boys and girls at 2137-2205 Gold Coast Highway (28.0628°S 153.4378°E). In 2018, the school had an enrolment of 1,255 students with 103 teachers (100 full-time equivalent) and 62 non-teaching staff (45 full-time equivalent).

There are no primary schools in Miami. The nearest government primary schools are Miami State School which (despite its name) is in the neighbouring suburb of Mermaid Waters to the north-west and Burleigh Heads State School in neighbouring Burleigh Heads to the south.

== Facilities ==
Miami Day Hospital is a private day hospital at 24 Hillcrest Parade (28.0631°S 153.4369°E).

== Amenities ==
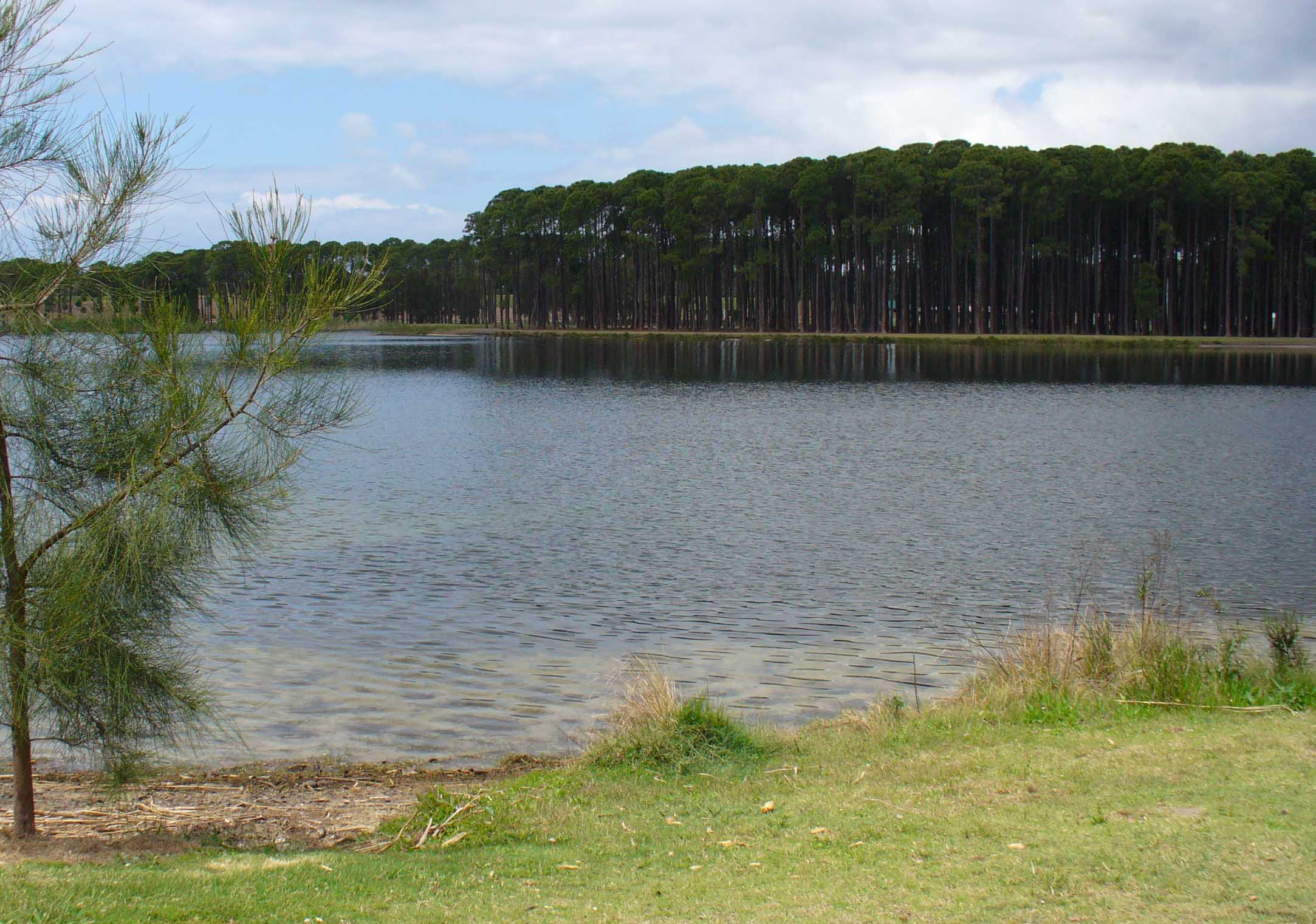
Pizzey Park Lake in Miami

Pizzey Park is a major Gold Coast sporting and recreational located at 80 Pacific Avenue (28.0638°S 153.4263°E).

Calvary Catholic Church is at 50 Redondo Avenue (28.0649°S 153.4411°E). It is part of the Burleigh Heads Catholic Parish within the Archdiocese of Brisbane.

Burleigh Bears Rugby League Football Club is at 80 Pacific Avenue (28.0633°S 153.4306°E).

Gold Coast Burleigh Golf Club is an 18-hole golf course at 114 Albion Street (28.0672°S 153.4348°E).

There are two surf life saving clubs in Miami:

- Miami Beach Surf Life Saving Club, 2 Hythe Street (28.0692°S 153.4443°E)
- North Burleigh Surf Life Saving Club, 293 The Esplanade (28.0741°S 153.4463°E)

Other sporting teams include the Eastern Cobras, and the Bond Pirates Rugby Union Club in Pizzey Park, which fields teams in juniors, seniors, women and Over 35s competitions. Bond Pirates have provided Wallabies players Tai McIsaac and James Slipper, and several members of the Croatian and Tongan national teams. Bond Pirates is an amalgamated Club, consisting of the original Bond University Club and the original Pirates Club.

== Transport ==
Miami has two high frequency bus services that run at intervals of 8–15 minutes during peak times. Buses that travel through the suburb are: 700 Broadbeach South - Tweed Heads (the 700 gets extend to the Gold Coast University Hospital between 12am-5am weekdays), 777 Broadbeach South - Gold Coast Airport (777 is an express bus route) and the TX1 Tweed Heads - Dream World (TX1 is a theme park express service only). All bus services on the Gold Coast are provided by Kinetic Gold Coast under contract by Translink, a subsidiary of the Department of Transport and Main Roads.

The Gold Coast Light Rail is currently being extended along the Gold Coast Highway as part of the Gold Coast Light Rail Stage 3 extension to Burleigh Heads, these works are expected to reach completion in 2025. Of the eight stations which are to be delivered as part of the Stage 3 works three will be located in Miami, Miami North Station (opposite Miami State High), Miami Station (between Hythe Street and Miami Shore Parade) and Christine Avenue Station (between Mountain View Avenue and Christine Avenue).

== Sources ==
- "Gold Coast Local Heritage Register - A to M" (PDF). Gold Coast City Council. Archived from the original (PDF) on 26 August 2020.
