= Bernie Elsey =

Australian businessman

Bernie Elsey Snr (27 May 1906 – 25 August 1986) was a property developer and entrepreneur, associated with early developments on the Gold Coast, Queensland, Australia.

== Biography ==
Elsey was born in England in 1906, and migrated to Australia at the age of nine. He had little formal education, and his distinguishing feature was his chronic stuttering. Elsey worked in the mundane trade of plumbing in Toowoomba, Queensland until he was 40. His motto was "To succeed in life, you have to sell yourself and believe in what you are doing". He did succeed in spite of apparent impediments.

He was unorthodox as well as grossly confident. After quitting the plumbing trade, he embarked on a new career by gambling on his salesmanship and offering himself to a Brisbane food wholesaler (Sanitarium) without pay for a month's trial. Again he succeeded and after a successful interlude with his own food distribution business arrived on the Gold Coast in 1949 to build the reputation as the "self-made millionaire whose colourful character helped paint the Gold Coast bright".

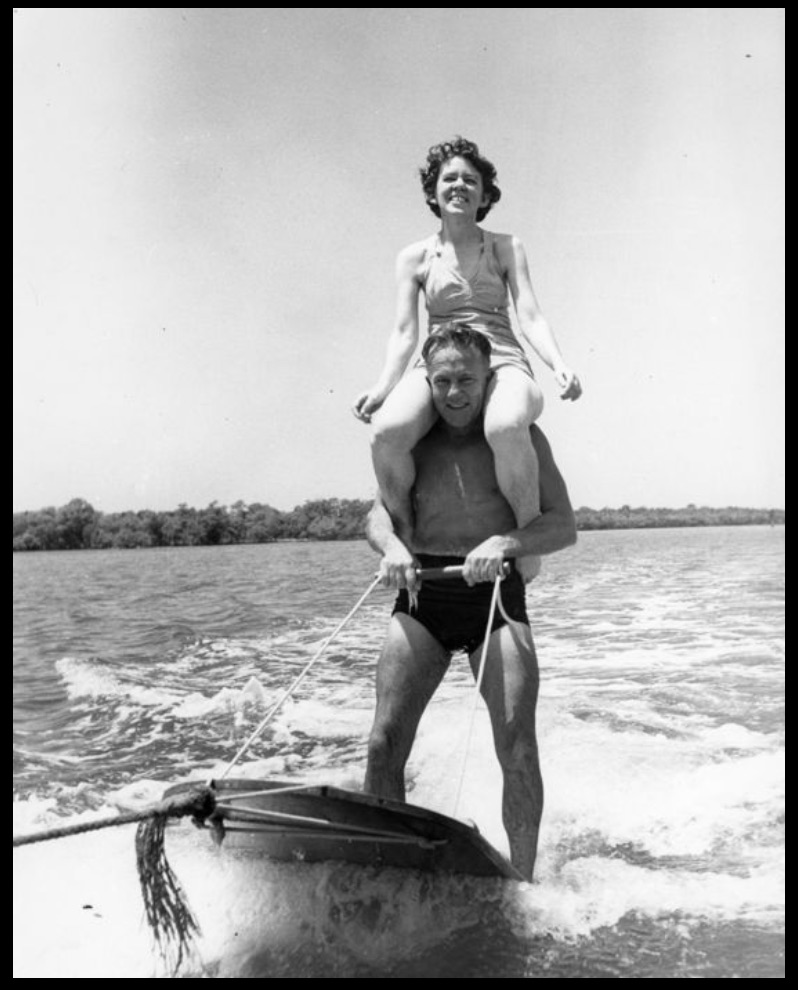
Bernard Elsey and Elsie Dunn, c.1952. Photo courtesy: State Library of Queensland

Elsey was a visionary who worked hard to sell and achieve his dreams. While consolidating his day-cruises to Tipplers Passage on Stradbroke Island, he hawked Singer sewing machines door to door. Quick to recognise the potential of the Broadwater, he successfully sold to Ansett Airlines the idea of a Sandringham flying boat service to Southport. Seeing passengers arriving from Sydney in lots of 44, ferrying them to their accommodation, he recognised that there was a deficiency in appropriate accommodation, a need which he set about filling.

Elsey saw entertainment as an adjunct of accommodation and set himself with a salesman's discernment to get the best for the least for the greatest profit. When he found that The Beatles, whom he had engaged to appear at his Coolangatta Beachcomber, expected free food as well as pay, he cancelled the arrangement and substituted an unknown Brisbane group, the Gibb Brothers, later known as the Bee Gees.

After deciding that Coolangatta was too conservative for his style of development, Elsey concentrated his energy on Surfers Paradise, where restraints were few and opportunities many. He built the Surfrider Hotel, the Surfers Paradise beachcomber and Tiki Village. His in-house entertainments were legendary. The pyjama parties and Hawaiian nights pushed the edges of the law, filling national papers with copy and his establishments with patrons. Nor was his creative boldness limited to in-house activity. After an acrimonious struggle with rivals, he became chairman of the Surfers Paradise Chamber of Commerce and proceeded to promote the region with considerable emphasis on sex. In a classic example of the mover and shaker tilting at the regulators, he introduced the Surfers Paradise Meter Maids, clad in gold bikinis and armed with sixpences employed to rescue motorists from expired parking meters. They became internationally famous and still operate, nearly fifty years later.

Elsey also nudged regulators towards a relaxation of regulations that restricted his commercial activities. Although he did not drink or smoke, Elsey campaigned vigorously for relaxed liquor laws and ultimately succeeded. With an eye to attracting international tourists, he initiated a push for a casino, basing his case on investigative visits to 22 countries with casinos.

Elsey developed Daydream Island in the Whitsunday Islands in 1967, only to rebuild it after Cyclone Ada ravaged the island three years later. Unfortunately in his post-Surfers Paradise enterprise, Elsey was not so advantaged with pliant regulators, accommodating banks or luck. As is often the case with those who back their judgement to the limit, he lost. That he married four times and fathered a son Bernie Jnr at 75, may indicate his persistence, his energy or his inability to form close permanent relationships or all of those, but without doubt, he moved and shook Surfers Paradise vigorously.

Bernard Elsey died on 25 August 1986 at his Gilston mansion in the Gold Coast Hinterland after a short battle with cancer. Before taking an overdose of sleeping pills, he wrote a love letter to his young Filipino bride Angelina, encouraging her to be strong and to look after their 5-year-old son. He also packed a box full of his most treasured worldly possessions addressed to his son saying simply, "Dear Jr, Carry on the good work. Lots of Love Daddy xoxo".

== In popular culture ==
The play Pyjamas in paradise (2010), written by John-Michael Howson, Peter Pinne and Ashley Irwin, was a dramatisation of the beach parties staged by Elsey in Surfers Paradise.
