= Surfers Paradise Meter Maids =

Parking philanthropists

Meter maid in 2011.

The original calling card

"To save you the inconvenience of a fine, our Meter Maid has inserted a coin in the meter. By courtesy of the Surfers Paradise Progress Association."

— The Sydney Morning Herald

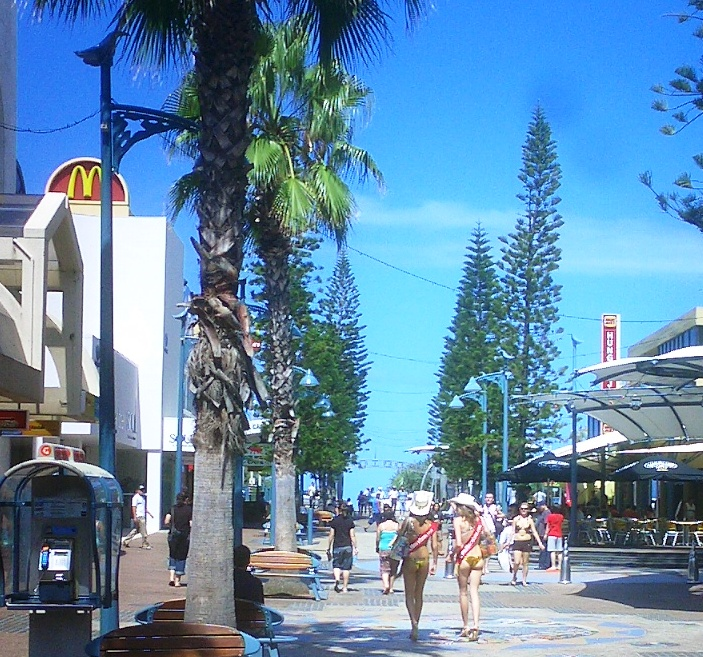
Meter maids walking down Cavill Avenue to the beach.

Surfers Paradise Meter Maids are bikini-clad women who operate in Surfers Paradise — a surfing, entertainment and tourism centre on the Gold Coast of Queensland, Australia. Unlike other meter maids, who issue parking tickets to motorists when they overstay, Gold Coast meter maids put money into parking meters which might otherwise expire, preventing vehicle owners from incurring a fine. After the introduction of pay-and-display parking meters they took on the task of explaining to motorists how the machines work.

== Origins ==
The Surfers Paradise meter maids were first instituted by entrepreneur Bernie Elsey in 1965, through the Surfers Paradise Progress Association, which was opposed to the introduction of parking meters by the Gold Coast City Council. The meter maids carried a gold bag of sixpences to top-up expired meters, thereby saving motorists from a £1 fine. The women left a card stating: "You have just been saved from a parking fine by the Surfers Paradise Meter Maids".

The activities of the meter maids were controversial because feeding parking meters was illegal. The council, however, decided to ignore the offence because the maids were providing such good publicity for the area. The first maid, Annette Welch, was disinherited by her grandmother for working in that way, but went on to marry the manager of a real estate firm in Surfers Paradise. Many women who worked as meter maids went on to have careers as models after the initial exposure.

== Later developments ==
At the outset, the maids' uniform was a gold lamé bikini and a tiara. That has now evolved into a gold lycra bikini and an Akubra hat — a traditional Australian bush hat. Maids usually have a sash emblazoned with "Surfers Paradise Meter Maids" or the like, and white knee-length boots are sometimes worn. Advertising is carried on the uniform to provide income. The maids, however, have had ongoing financial problems since the council forbade them from selling merchandise on its land, such as keyrings, calendars and "stubby holders" for beer bottles.

When a cyclone which devastated the area in 1967 caused a decline in tourism, the then mayor of the Gold Coast, Bruce Small, toured Australia with a group of maids to promote the area. For a while the maids were sponsored by the local chamber of commerce, but that stopped in 1990 when maids Roberta Aitchison and Melinda Stewart appeared in Penthouse. Aitchison and Stewart then set up a business to continue the service, but a rival organisation was established by Lisa Hassan. A legal battle erupted a few years later when Aitchison was sued by Hassan for distributing a video of her performing a striptease. In 2009, Aitchison bought Hassan out. A museum now exists to record the history of Gold Coast's meter maids.

== Criticism ==
There has been persistent criticism that the scantily-clad meter maids are an anachronism and an embarrassment. In the early 2000s, some local business owners recruited 10 women as "tourism ambassadors" — dressed in khaki shirts and shorts, and sensible shoes — to patrol the beach-front, distributing surf safety advice and free sunscreen. In 2010, Gold Coast Tourism revealed plans to have the maids travel around Australia to promote the Gold Coast, but in much less revealing outfits. Roberta Aitchison was quoted as querying the idea, saying that the maids' distinctive swimsuits were integral to their image. There have been efforts to introduce male equivalent meter boys.

== See also ==
- Tourism in Australia
