= North Burleigh, Queensland =

North Burleigh
- Town
- Interactive map of North Burleigh
- Coordinates: 28.0652°S 153.4427°E
- Country: Australia
- State: Queensland
- City: Gold Coast
- LGA: City of Gold Coast
- Location: 6.0 km (3.7 mi) NE of Burleigh Heads; 8.5 km (5.3 mi) S of Surfers Paradise; 13.5 km (8.4 mi) SSE of Southport; 85.8 km (53.3 mi) SSE of Brisbane

Government
  - State electorate: Mermaid Beach
  - Federal division: Moncrieff
- Time zone: UTC+10:00 (AEST)
- Postcode: 4220

North Burleigh is a coastal town in the City of Gold Coast, Queensland, Australia. It is located within the suburb of Miami.

== History ==
Surveyor Charles Daniel Dunne surveyed the Town of North Burleigh on 10 September 1889. Forty town lots were offered for sale on 24 December 1889.
