= Eddie Kornhauser =

Australian businessman (1918–2006)

Eddie Kornhauser (7 September 1918 – 7 February 2006) was an Australian property developer. He was one of the most prolific property developers on the Queensland Gold Coast. He was born in Kraków, Poland in 1918, but his Jewish family moved to Berlin, Germany when he was still a toddler. The family fled Nazi Germany in the late 1930s and Kornhauser and his brother Jack migrated to Australia and settled in Melbourne.

The brothers started a fur trading business called Arctic Furs and expanded to Sydney where Kornhauser became interested in property development. He built Kay House, the first inner city, post-war high rise and he also pioneered the planning of the Menzies Hotel in Sydney and built five Melbourne suburban hotels.

Kornhauser moved to the Gold Coast in the early 1970s where he formed the HSP Property Group and began making his mark on the Gold Coast skyline. His best known project was the Paradise Centre in Surfers Paradise, which was built on the site of the original Surfers Paradise hotel.

During the 1980s, he had close links with the "developer friendly" Sir Joh Bjelke-Petersen government in Queensland, coming under scrutiny from the opposition and being accused in state parliament of money laundering. He was particularly close to Russ Hinze, and allegations that he paid money to Hinze family companies in return for corrupt business favours led to three formal corruption charges. In 1991, Kornhauser was acquitted of all charges after an eight-week trial in the Queensland District Court.

According to the 2005 Business Review Weekly rich list, Kornhauser had an estimated fortune of $345 million.

He was survived by his three children: Ricci Swart, Larry Kornhauser and Eric (Eliezer) Kornhauser.
