= Ipswich Swifts =

Australian rugby league club, based in Ipswich, QLD

Swifts Rugby League Football Club, commonly referred to as Swifts Bluebirds or simply as Swifts is an Australian semi-professional rugby league club based in Purga, Ipswich, Queensland. The club currently competes in the City of Ipswich Mayor's A Grade Cup. The club was founded in 1919.

== History ==
Swifts Rugby League Football Club was founded in 1919 as Booval Rugby League Football Club. The emblem used was a "Swift" Bluebird. It was chosen because it had a variety of attributes such as courage, speed and strength. Although, the original jersey colours consisted of sky blue and white, as well as black shorts, in 1951, the merger of Booval Swifts and All Sports has now added the colour red to the jersey.

In the 2019 finals, they eliminated Redbank Plains Bears with a 41–28 victory in week one of the finals, before defeating the Goodna & Districts Eagles 26-22 last weekend. On 15 September, the third placed, Swifts faced the minor premiers, Brothers Ipswich in the grand final.
