= Gold Coast, Queensland =

Australian coastal city

Gold Coast
- City
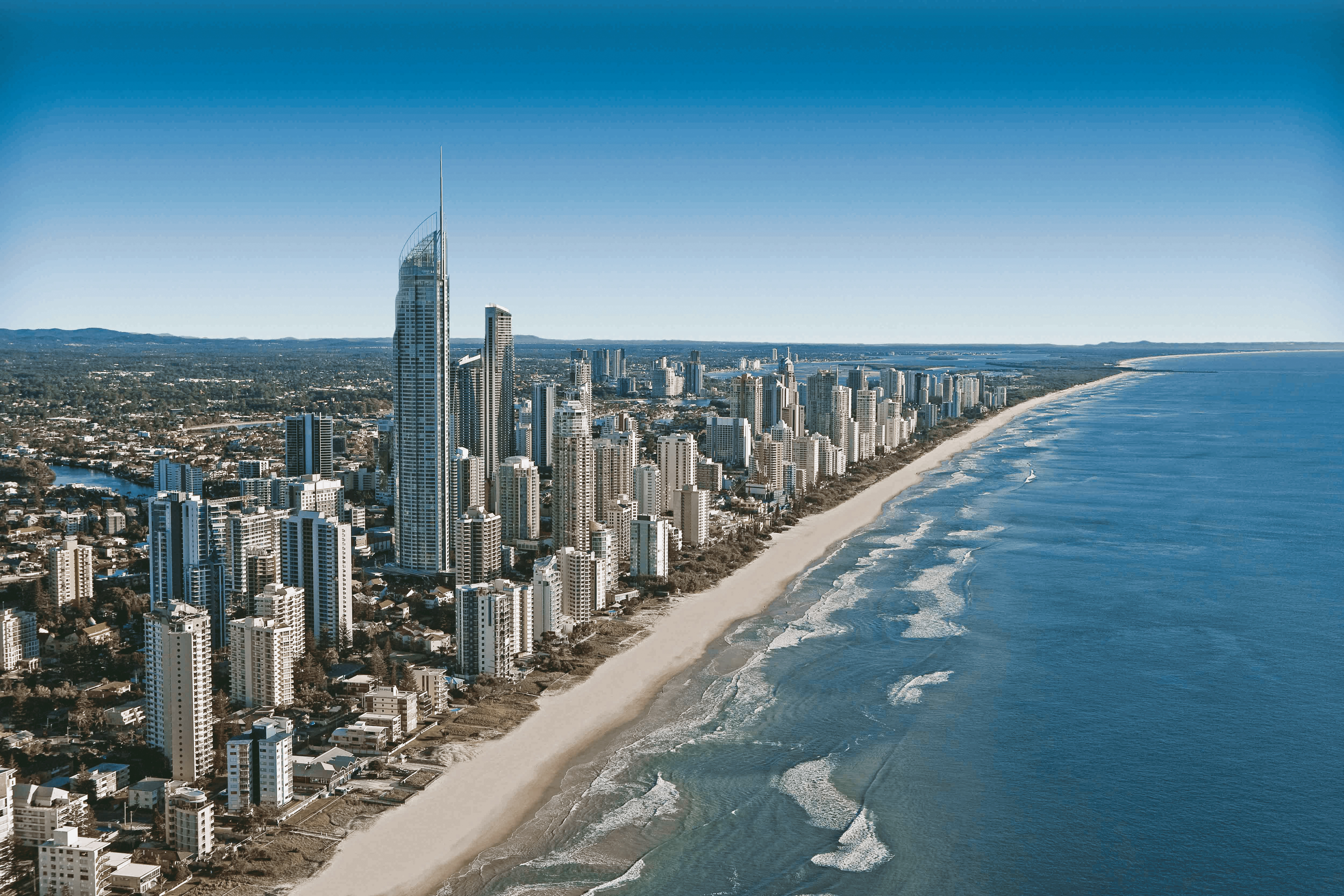
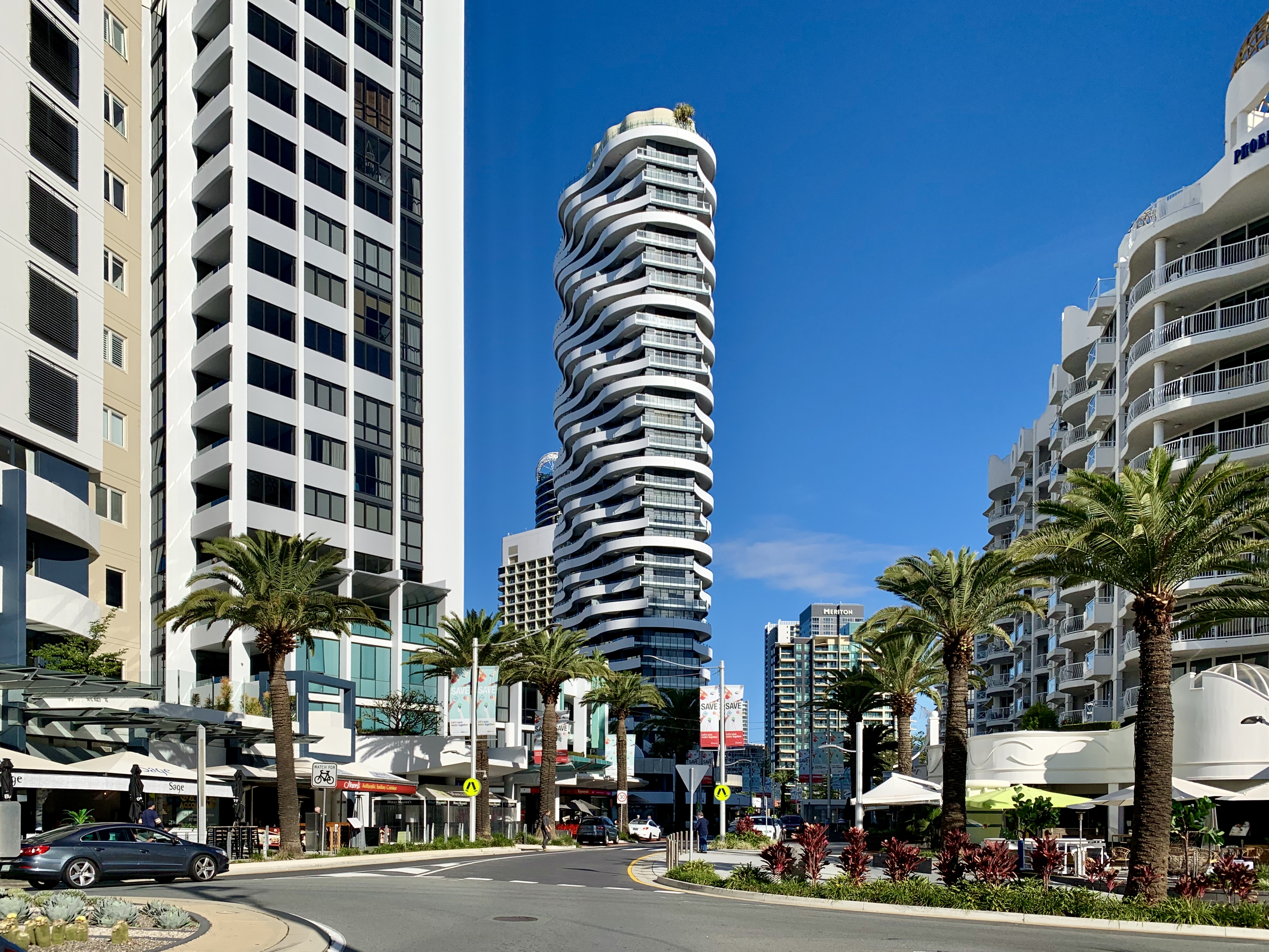
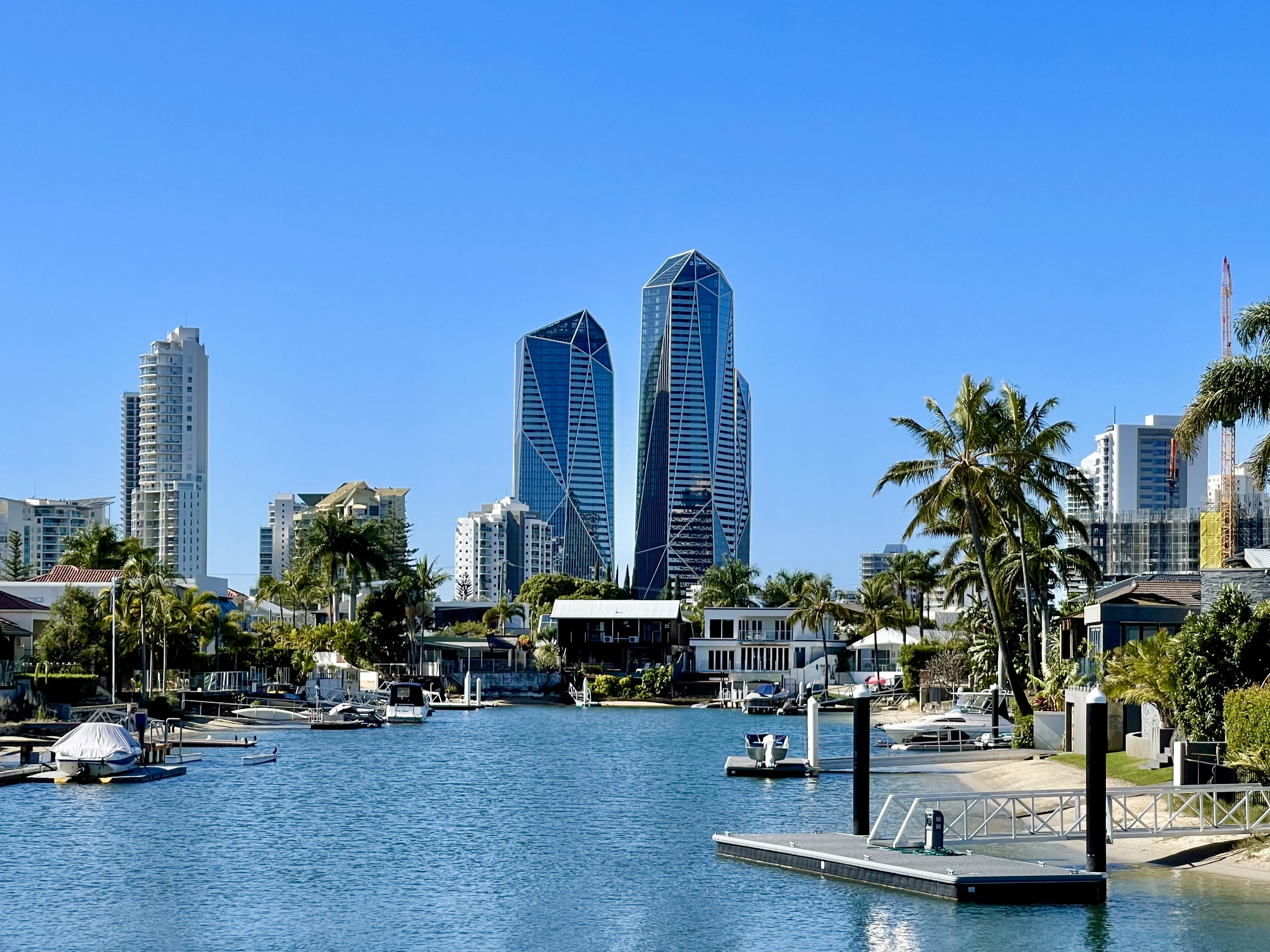
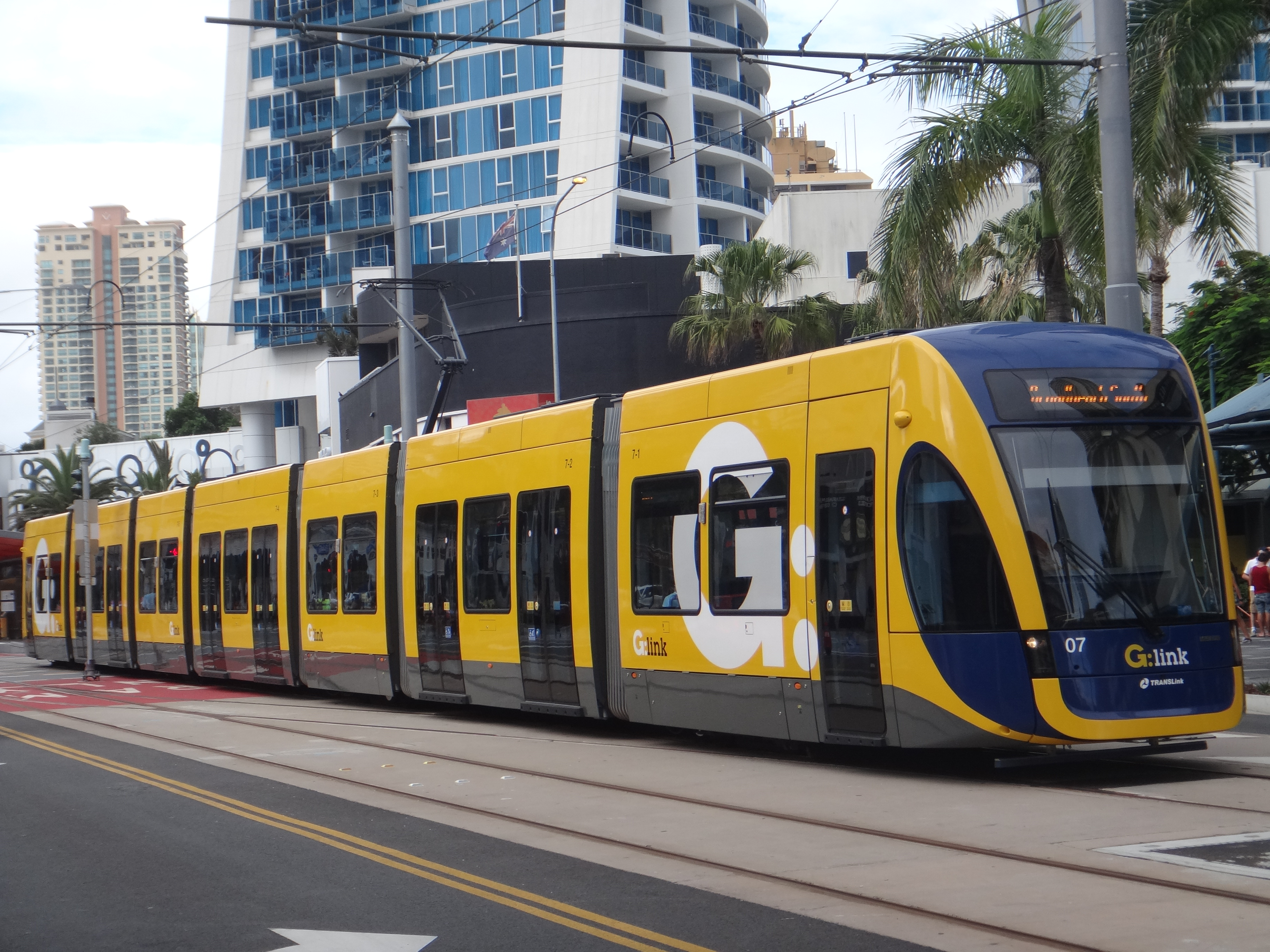
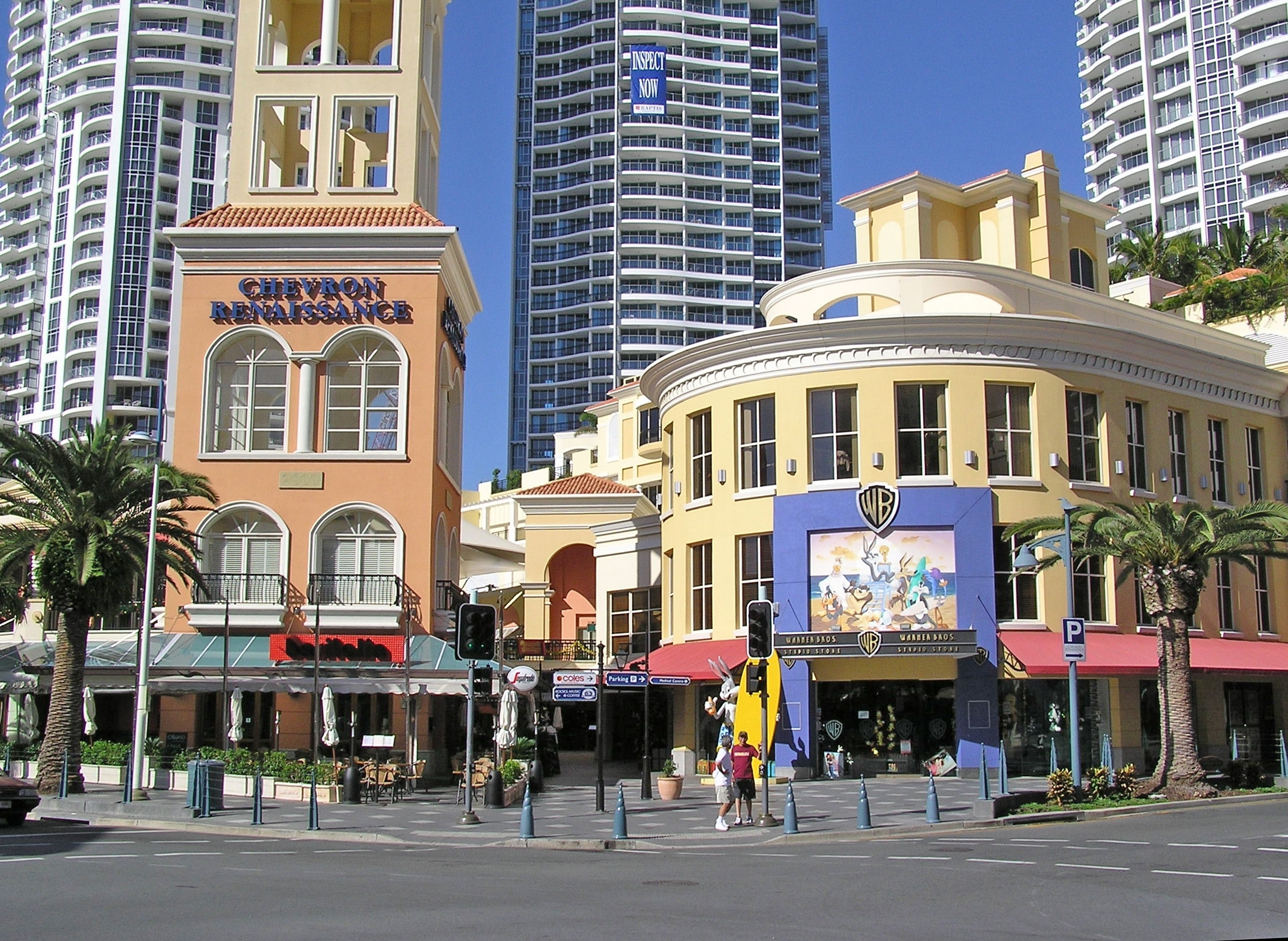
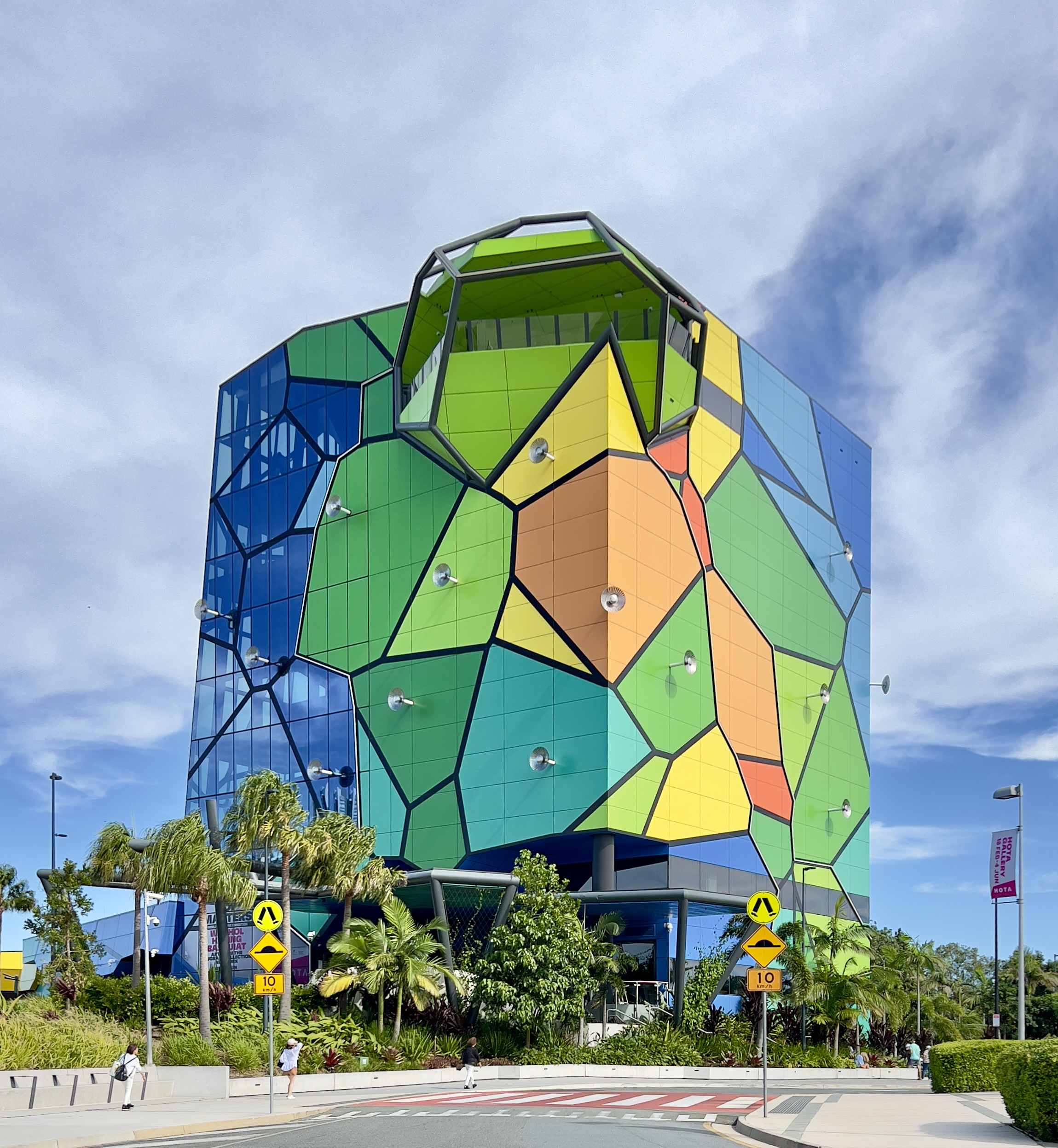
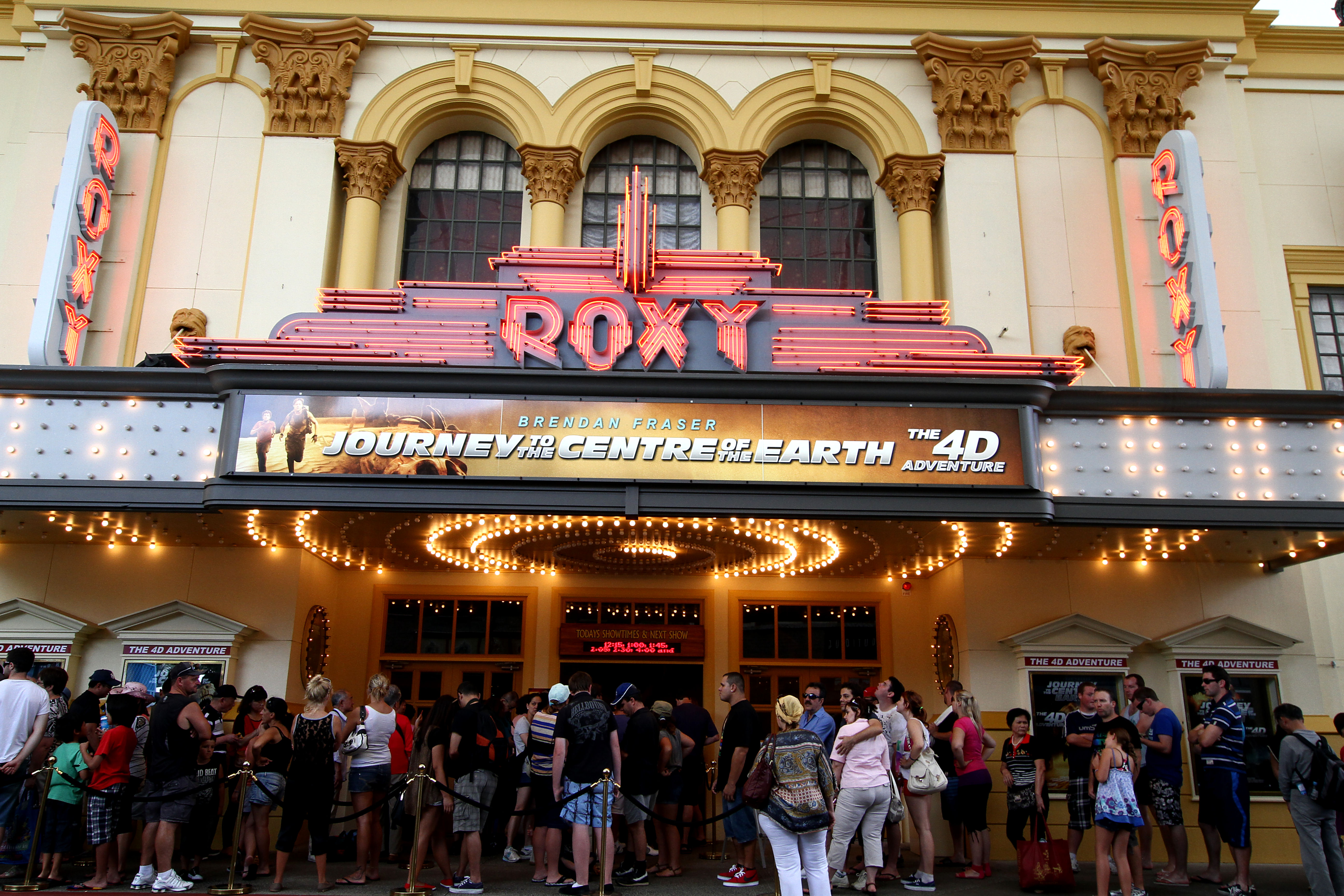
- Q1 and the Gold Coast skyline Broadbeach Isle of Capri G:link light rail Chevron Renaissance Home of the Arts Roxy Theatre at Movie World

- Coordinates: 27.9983°S 153.3344°E
- Country: Australia
- State: Queensland
- LGA: City of Gold Coast
- Location: 71.4 km (44.4 mi) SSE of Brisbane CBD
- Established: 1865

Government
  - State electorate: Bonney; Broadwater; Burleigh; Coomera; Currumbin; Gaven; Mermaid Beach; Mudgeeraba; Southport; Surfers Paradise; Theodore
  - Federal division: Fadden; Forde; McPherson; Moncrieff; Wright

Area
  - Total: 414.3 km^{2} (160.0 sq mi)

Population
  - Totals: 741,700 (2026) (6th); 761,634 (Metro) (2025)
  - Density: 972/km^{2} (2,520/sq mi)
- Time zone: UTC+10:00 (AEST)
- Mean max temp: 25.4 °C (77.7 °F)
- Mean min temp: 17.3 °C (63.1 °F)
- Annual rainfall: 1,252.9 mm (49.33 in)

The Gold Coast, also known by its initials, GC, is a coastal city and region in the state of Queensland, Australia, located approximately 66 kilometres (41 mi) south-southeast of the centre of the state capital, Brisbane. It is on the central eastern coast of Australia adjoining the Pacific Ocean. It is Queensland's second-largest city after Brisbane, as well as Australia's sixth-largest city and the most populous non-capital city. The city's central business district is located roughly in the centre of the Gold Coast in the suburb of Southport. The urban area of the Gold Coast is concentrated along the coast, sprawling between 60–70 kilometres, joining up with the Greater Brisbane region to the north and the state border with New South Wales to the south. Nicknames of the city include the 'Glitter Strip' and the 'Goldy'. The demonym of a Gold Coast resident is Gold Coaster.

The area that became the Gold Coast was originally inhabited by the indigenous Yugambeh people. The city grew from a collection of small townships, the earliest being Nerang in 1865. From the 1920s onwards, tourism led to significant economic growth in the region, and by 1959 the Gold Coast was declared a city, with its first high-rise being built in 1960. The Gold Coast boomed from the 1980s onwards with extensive skyscraper construction. This era was defined by the city's 'white-shoe brigade' developers, neon lights, and organised crime, particularly the yakuza and the Russian mafia. The late 20th century saw the city's tourism diversify with theme park openings, and in the early 21st century became an international destination for film production.

The Gold Coast has a diverse economy with strengths in health, tourism, arts and culture, and construction, with a GDP of AU$55.1 billion as of 2025. The city ranks highly as one of the country's cultural and creative hotspots, alongside content creators, a growing video games industry, and leads Australia in startups per capita. The Gold Coast is central to the nation's entertainment industry with a major film and television production industry, leading to the city's metonym of Goldywood. The Gold Coast is also host of the AACTA Awards, the Asia Pacific Screen Awards, and the Gold Coast Film Festival.

The Gold Coast is a major tourist destination with a sunny, subtropical climate and has become widely known for its surfing beaches (such as Surfers Paradise), high-rise buildings, theme parks, nightlife, and rainforest hinterland.

== History ==
The Gold Coast is the ancestral home of a number of Indigenous clans of the Yugambeh people, including the Kombumerri, Mununjali, and Wangerriburra clans. Europeans arrived in 1823 when explorer John Oxley explored the Tweed River. The hinterland's timber supply attracted people to the area in the mid-19th century.

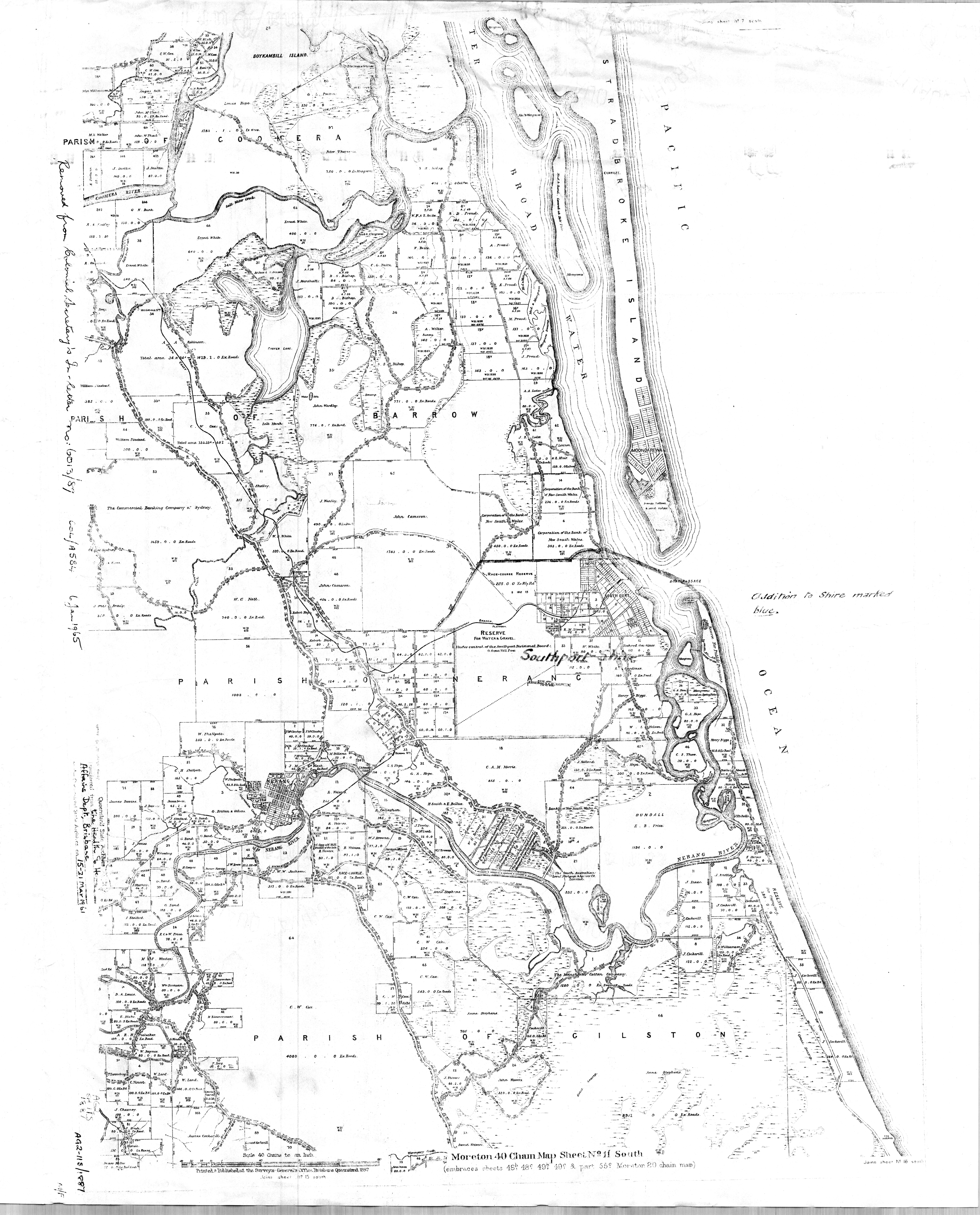
Map of the Gold Coast, 1887

A number of small townships developed along the coast and in the hinterland. The western suburb of Nerang was surveyed and established as a base for the industry, and by 1870 a town reserve had been set aside. By 1873, the town reserve of Burleigh Heads had also been surveyed, and successful land sales had taken place. In 1875, the small settlement opposite the boat passage at the head of the Nerang River, known as Nerang Heads or Nerang Creek Heads, was surveyed and renamed Southport, with the first land sales scheduled to take place in Beenleigh. Southport quickly grew a reputation as a secluded holiday destination for wealthy Brisbane residents.

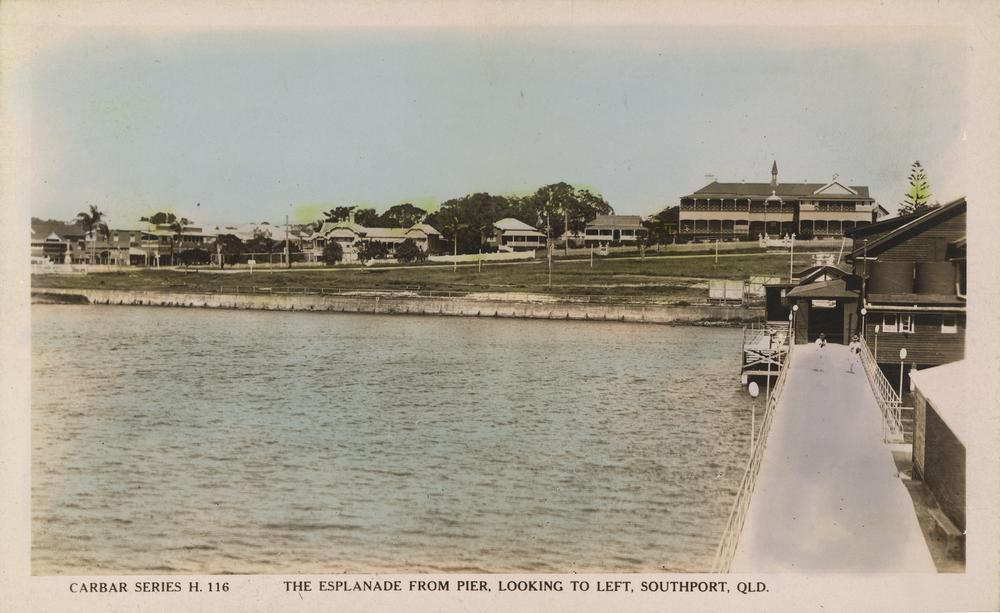
Southport Esplanade in 1928

The post-World War One Era saw the rise of the "seaside shack". The seaside shack provided the opportunity for the coastal "getaway" with modest investment. From 1914 to 1946, they popped up all along the South Coast. Seaside shacks were exceedingly cheap and were an early use of the concept of recycling. Many were built of disused or second grade timber, all kinds of materials were used for the holiday seaside shack – including fibro cement, metal containers, and left-over farm sheds; even disused trams were sold off as seaside shacks.

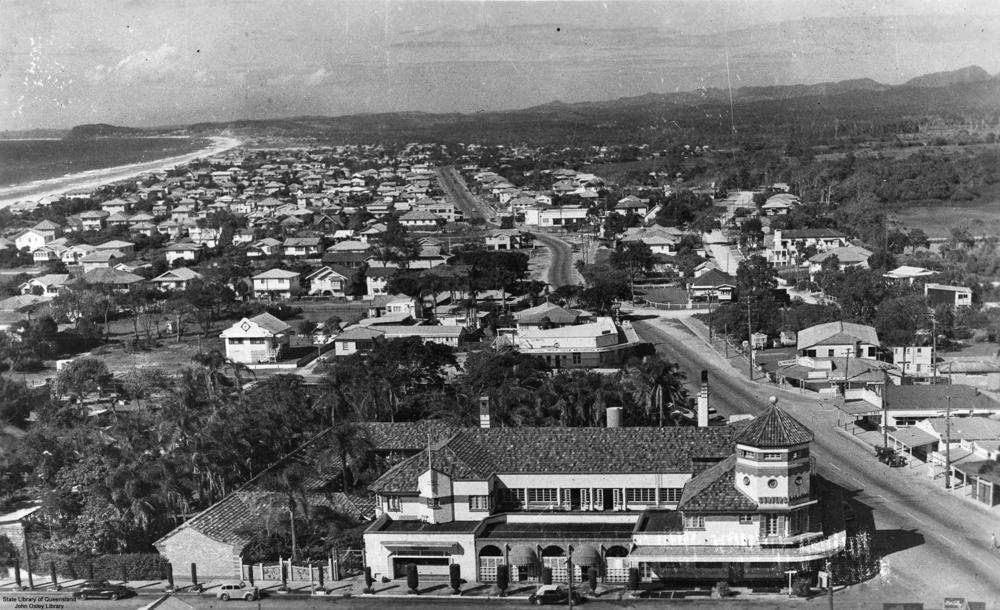
Surfers Paradise, 1951

After the establishment of the Surfers Paradise Hotel in the late 1920s, the Gold Coast region grew significantly. The Gold Coast was originally known as the South Coast (because it was south of Brisbane). However, over-inflated prices for real estate and other goods and services led to the nickname "Gold Coast" from 1950. South Coast locals initially considered the name "Gold Coast" derogatory. However, soon the "Gold Coast" simply became a convenient way to refer to the holiday strip from Southport to Coolangatta. The Town of South Coast was formed through the amalgamation of Town of Coolangatta and Town of Southport along with the coastal areas (such as Burleigh Heads) from the Shire of Nerang on 17 June 1949, with the effect of having the present-day Gold Coast coastal strip as a single local government area. As the tourism industry grew into the 1950s, local businesses began to adopt the term Gold Coast in their names, and on 23 October 1958 the Town of South Coast was renamed Town of Gold Coast. The area was proclaimed a city, less than one year later, on 16 May 1959.

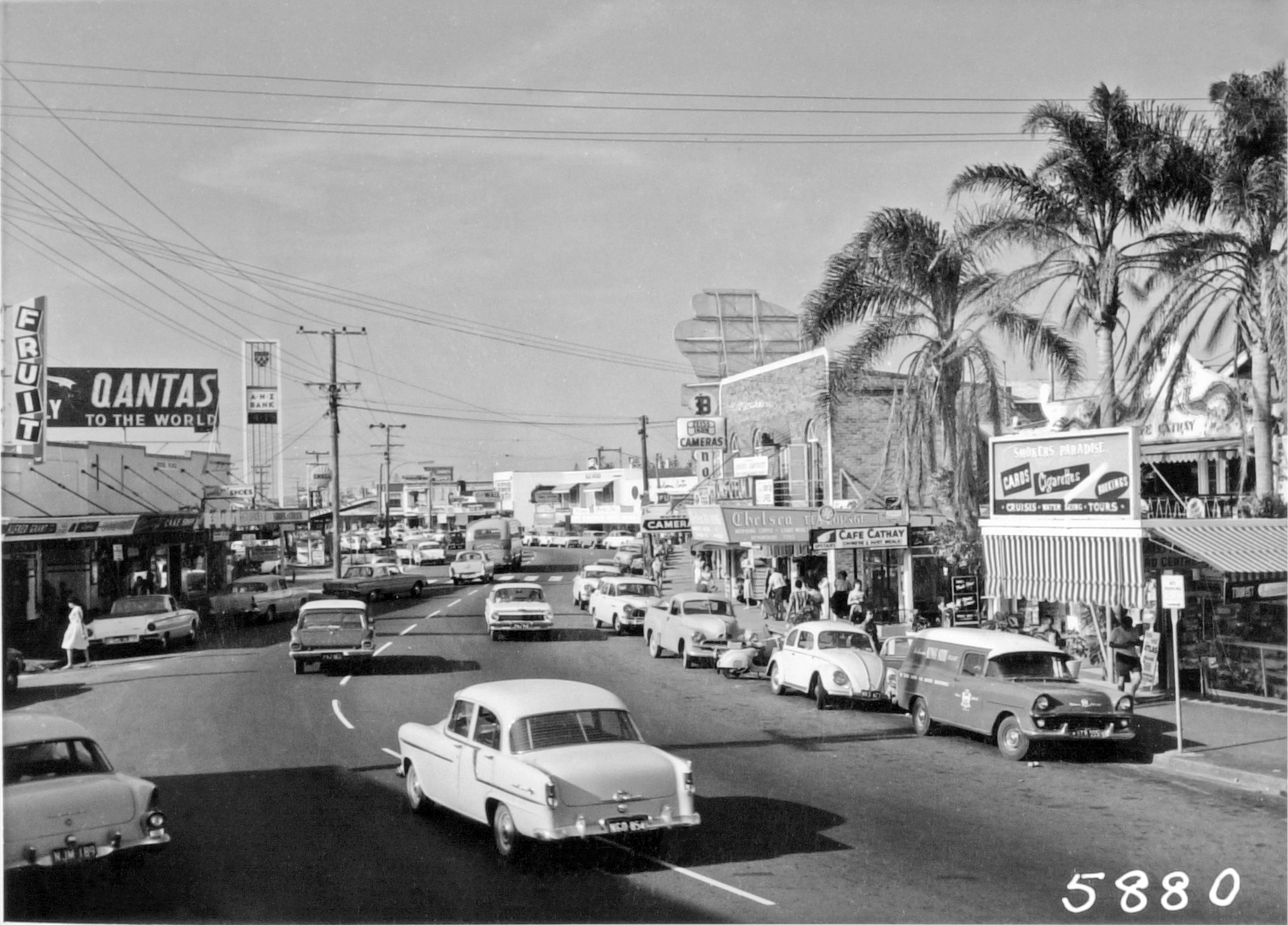
Cars on the Gold Coast Highway, in 1961

The area boomed in the 1980s as a leading tourist destination. In 1994, the City of Gold Coast local government area was expanded to include the Shire of Albert.

In 2007, the Gold Coast overtook the population of Newcastle, New South Wales, to become the sixth largest city in Australia and the largest non-capital city.

The Gold Coast hosted the 2018 Commonwealth Games.

== Demographics ==
In the 2016 census, the urban area of the Gold Coast had a population of 540,559 people. According to the 2016 census, the population of the Gold Coast, including rural areas, was 569,997. The median age was 39 years old, 1 year older than the nationwide median. The male-to-female ratio was 48.6 to 51.4. The most commonly nominated ancestries were English (29.3%), Australian (22.5%), Irish (8.2%), Scottish (7.5%), and German (3.6%). 64% of people were born in Australia, while the other most common countries of birth were New Zealand (7.9%), England (5.2%), China (1.2%), South Africa (1.2%), and Japan (0.7%). Indigenous Australians accounted for 1.7% of the population. The most commonly spoken languages other than English were Mandarin (1.6%), Japanese (1.0%), Korean (0.6%), Spanish (0.6%), and Cantonese (0.5%).

According to the Australian Official Census in 2021, the most common religious affiliations in Gold Coast reported were none (43.4%), Catholic (18.2%), Anglican (11.9%), Uniting Church (2.9%), Non-denominational Christian (3.1%), Presbyterian and Reformed (1.9%), Buddhism (1.4%), Pentecostal (1.3%), Baptist (1.1%), Hinduism (1.1%) and Islam (1.0%).

== Geography ==
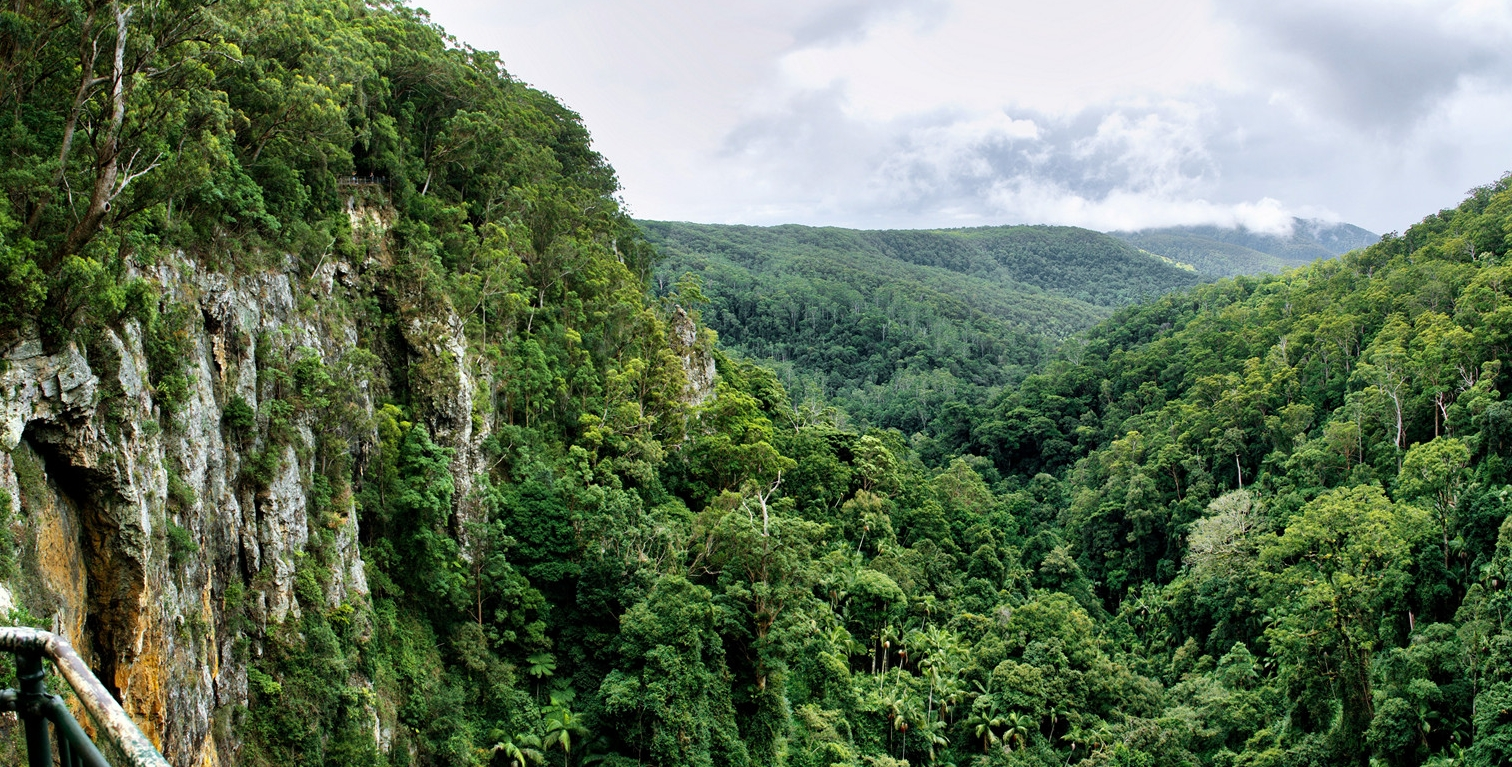
View from the lookout at Purling Brook Falls in the Gold Coast hinterland

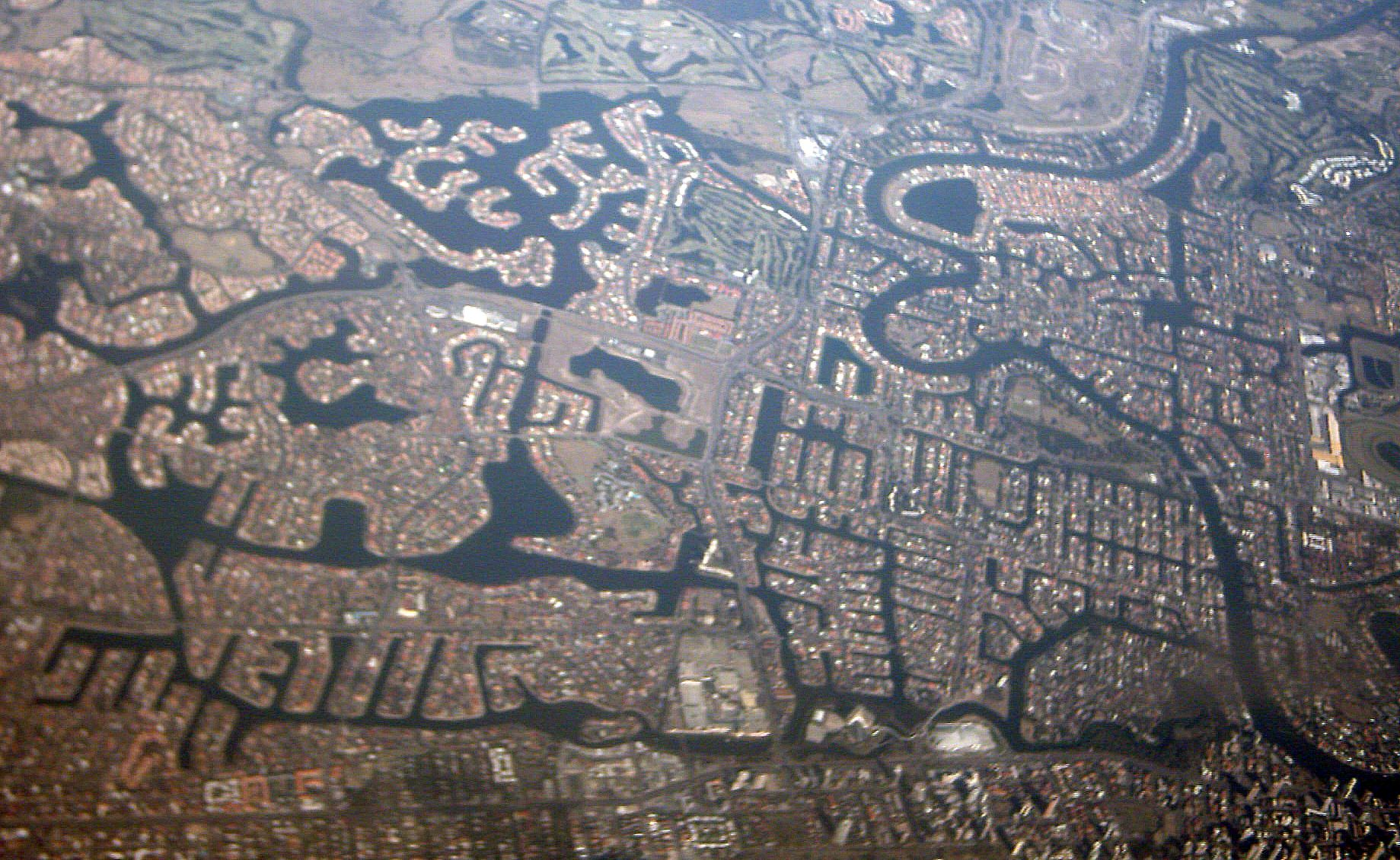
Aerial view of Gold Coast suburbs: Mermaid Waters (left) and Broadbeach Waters (right). The image depicts the artificial canals of the city, built to accommodate housing development.

The Gold Coast is approximately half covered by forests of various types. This includes small patches of near-pristine ancient rainforest, mangrove-covered islands, and patches of coastal heathlands and farmland with areas of uncleared eucalyptus forest. Of the plantation pine forests that were planted in the 1950s and 1960s, when commercial forest planting for tax minimisation was encouraged by the Commonwealth government, tiny remnants remain. Most of the Gold Coast area was covered by forest prior to European human settlement and was exposed to extensive land clearing in the 19th century.

Gold Coast City lies in the southeast corner of Queensland, to the south of Brisbane, the state capital. The Albert River separates the Gold Coast from Logan City, a local government area south of the City of Brisbane.

Gold Coast City stretches from the Albert River, Logan River, and Southern Moreton Bay to the border with New South Wales (NSW) approximately 56 km (35 mi) south, and extends from the coast west to the foothills of the Great Dividing Range in World Heritage listed Lamington National Park.

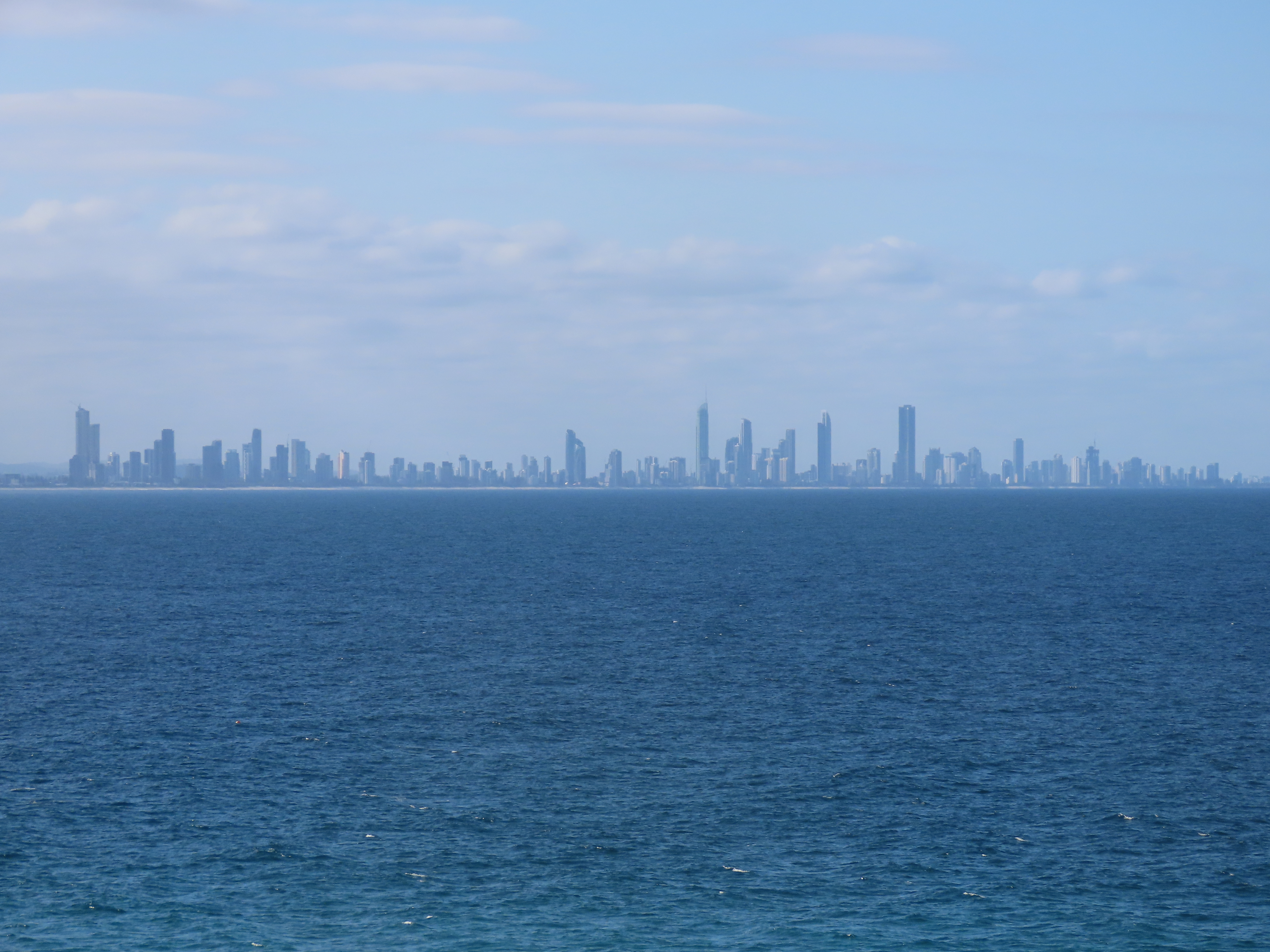
Gold Coast skyline seen from Coolangatta

The southernmost town of Gold Coast City, Coolangatta, includes Point Danger and its lighthouse. Coolangatta is a twin city with Tweed Heads located directly across the NSW border. At 28.1667°S 153.55°E, this is the most easterly point on the Queensland mainland (Point Lookout on the offshore island of North Stradbroke is slightly further east). From Coolangatta, approximately forty kilometres of holiday resorts and surfing beaches stretch north to the suburb of Main Beach, and then further on Stradbroke Island. The suburbs of Southport and Surfers Paradise form the Gold Coast's commercial centre. The major river in the area is the Nerang River. Much of the land between the coastal strip and the hinterland was once wetlands drained by this river. Still, the swamps have been converted into artificial waterways (over 260 kilometres (160 mi) in length or over 9 times the length of the canals of Venice, Italy) and artificial islands covered in upmarket homes. The heavily developed coastal strip sits on a narrow barrier sandbar between these waterways and the sea.

To the west, the city borders a part of the Great Dividing Range commonly referred to as the Gold Coast hinterland. A 206 km^{2} (80 sq mi) section of the mountain range is protected by Lamington National Park and has been listed as a World Heritage area in recognition of its "outstanding geological features displayed around shield volcanic craters and the high number of rare and threatened rainforest species". The area attracts bushwalkers and day-trippers. Important rainforest pollinating and seed-dispersing Black flying foxes (Pteropus alecto) are found in the area and may be heard foraging at night.

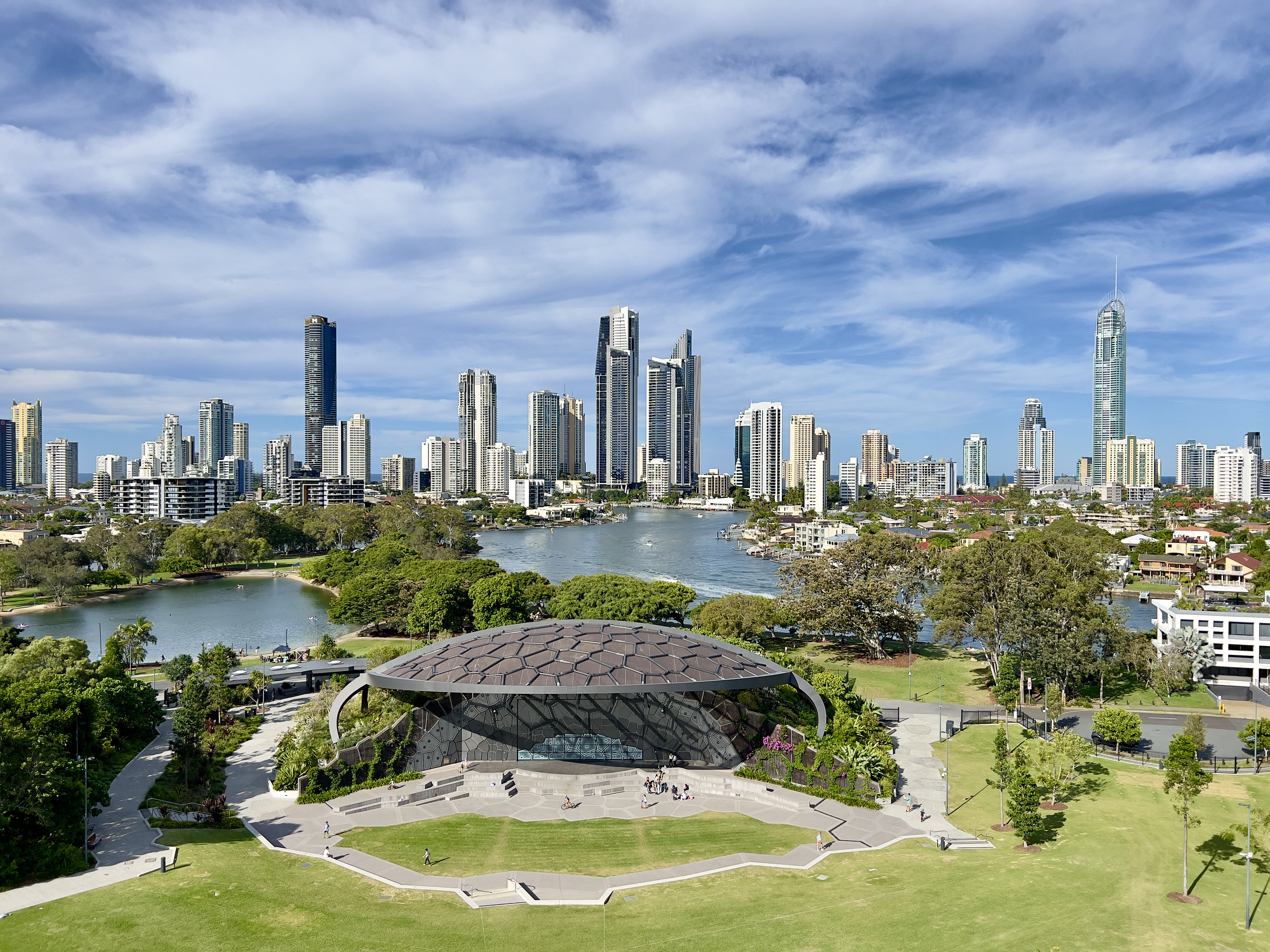
The skyline of Surfers Paradise and its surrounds, as viewed from the Home of the Arts

=== Urban structure ===
The City of Gold Coast includes suburbs, localities, towns and rural districts.

The declaration of Southport as a Priority Development Area (PDA) and new investment into the CBD is driving transformative change and creating new business and investment opportunities.

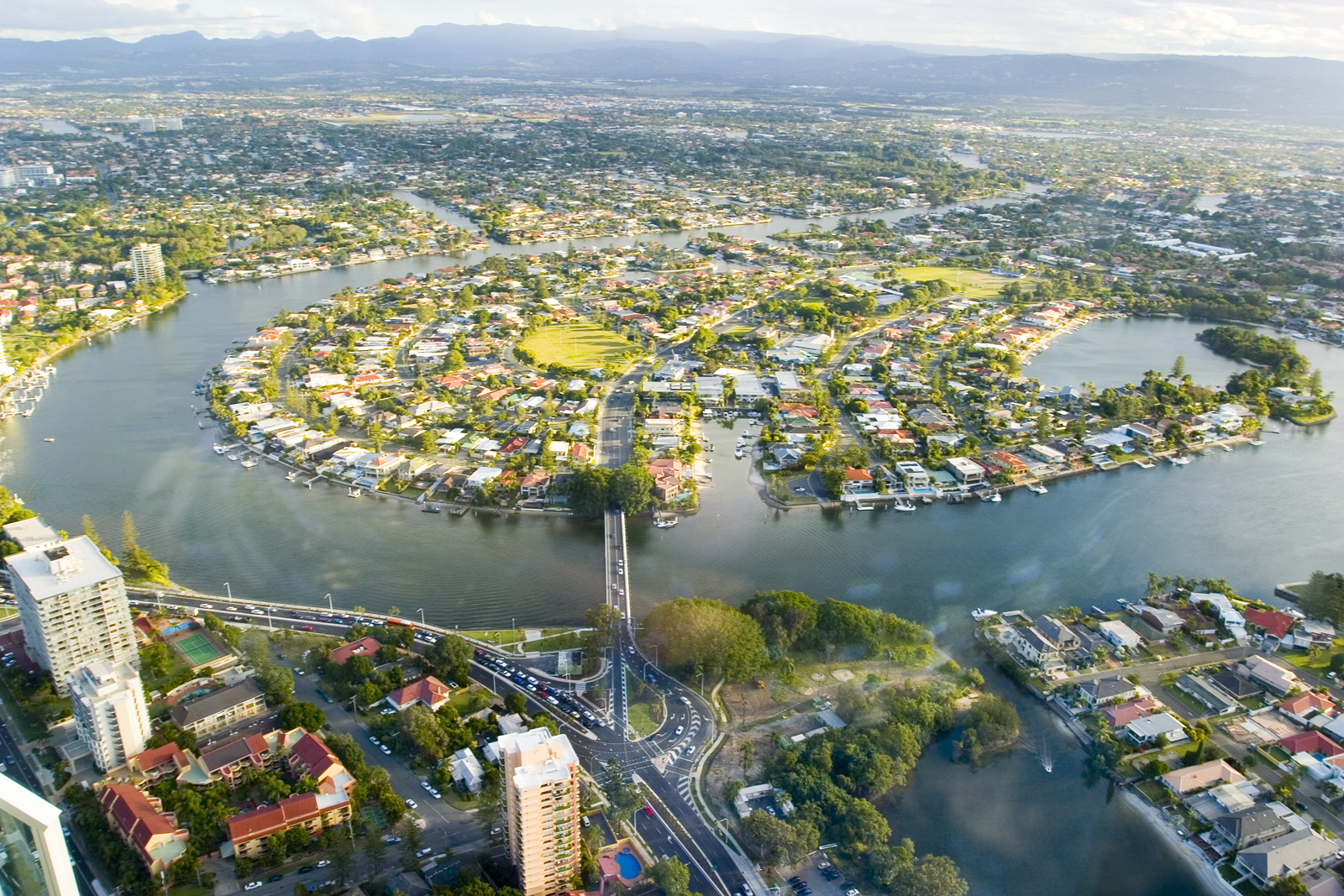
Suburban canals, as viewed from the Q1

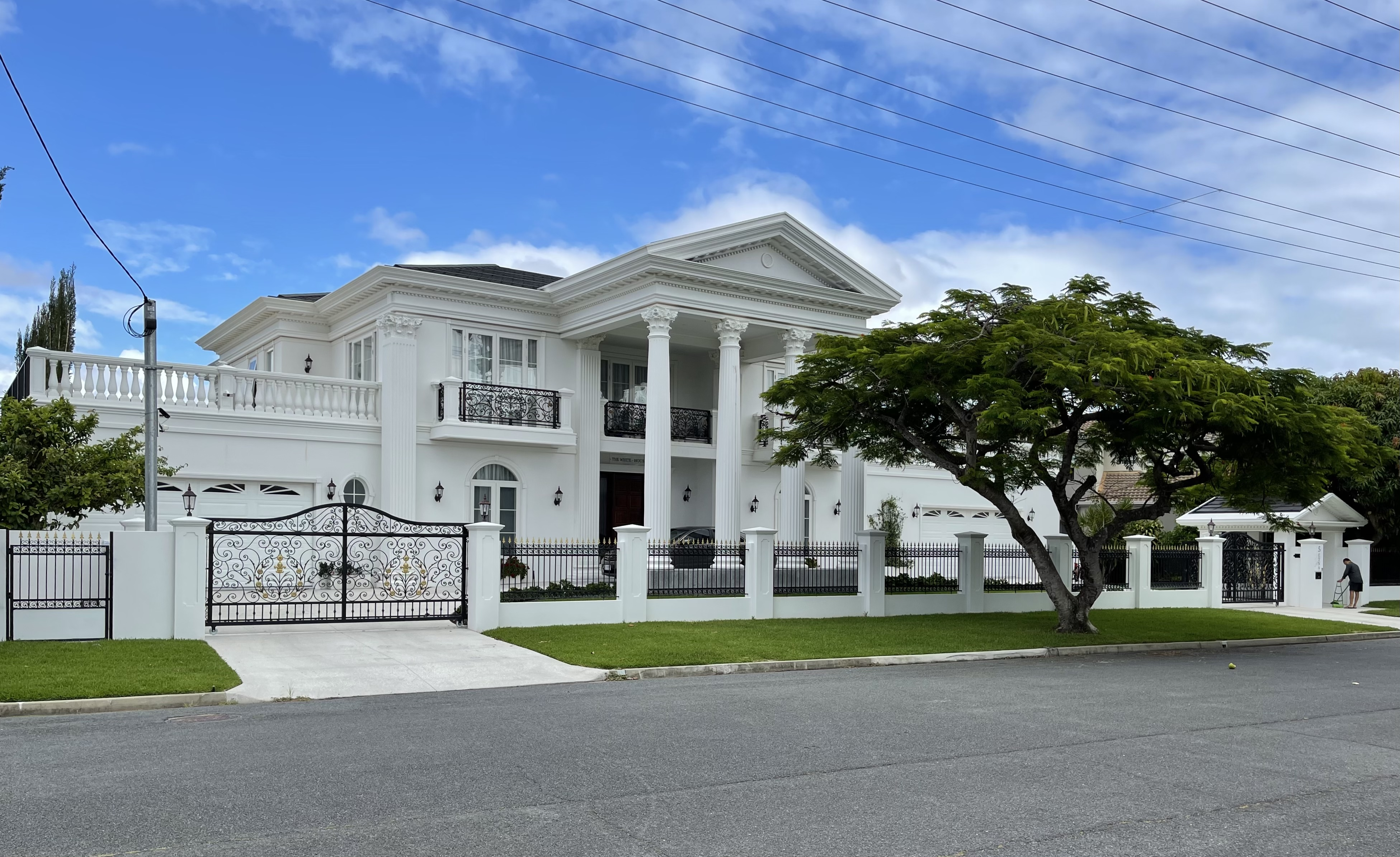
Mansions are a common part of the Gold Coast's urban environment.

=== Waterways ===
Waterfront canal living is a feature of the Gold Coast. Most canal frontage homes have pontoons. The Gold Coast Seaway, between The Spit and South Stradbroke Island, allows vessels direct access to the Pacific Ocean from The Broadwater and many of the city's canal estates. Breakwaters on either side of the Seaway prevent longshore drift and the bar from silting up. A sand pumping operation on the Spit pipes sand under the Seaway to continue this natural process.

Residential canals were first built in the Gold Coast in the 1950s and construction continues. Most canals are extensions to the Nerang River. Still, there are more to the south along Tallebudgera Creek and Currumbin Creek and to the north along the Gold Coast Broadwater, South Stradbroke Island, Coomera River and southern Moreton Bay. Early canals included Florida Gardens and Isle of Capri, which were under construction at the time of a 1954 flood. Recently constructed canals include Harbour Quays and Riverlinks completed in 2007. There are over 890 kilometres (550 mi) of constructed residential waterfront land within the city that is home to over 80,000 residents.

=== Beaches ===
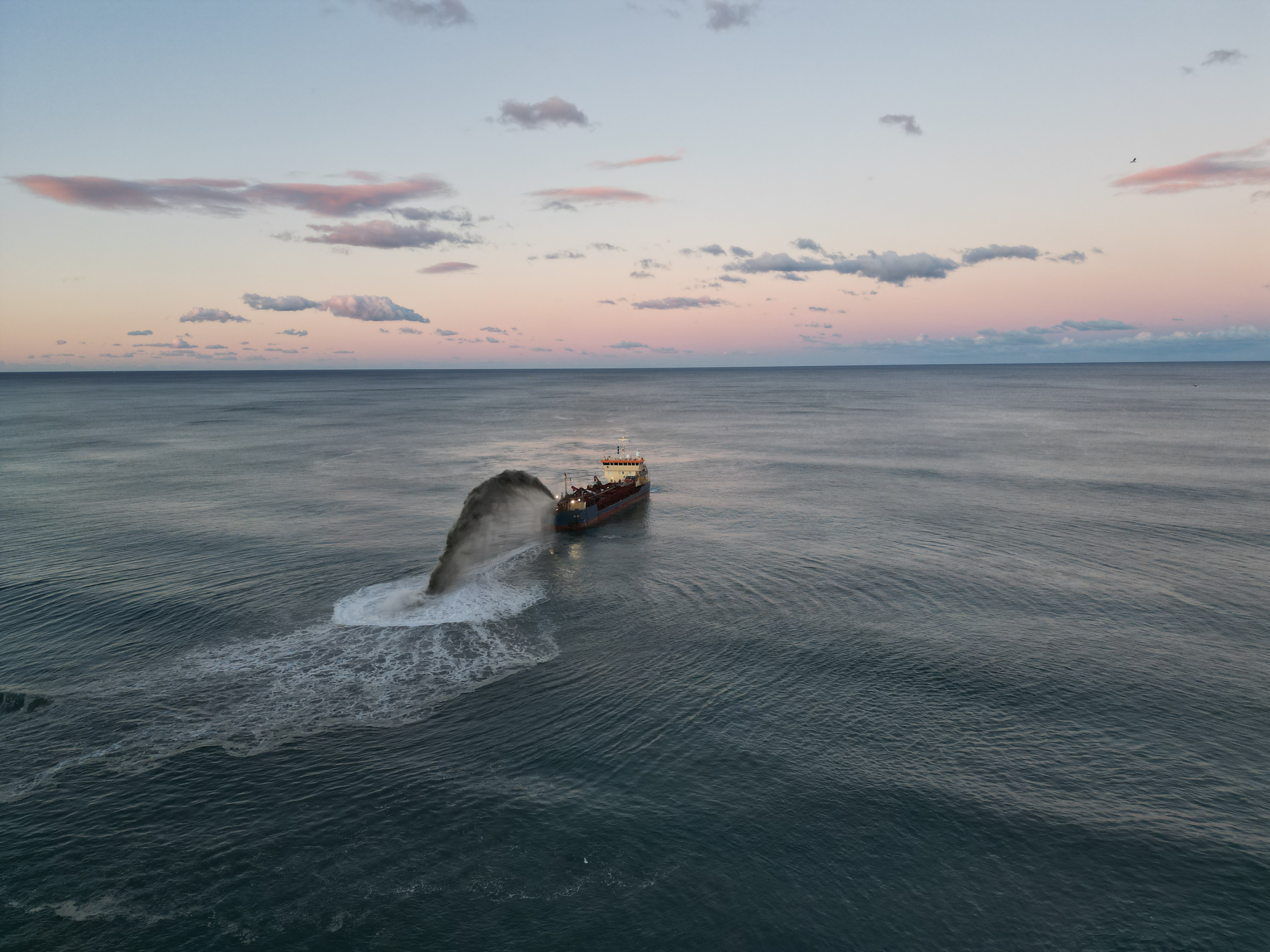
Sand Nourishment barge at work in June 2025

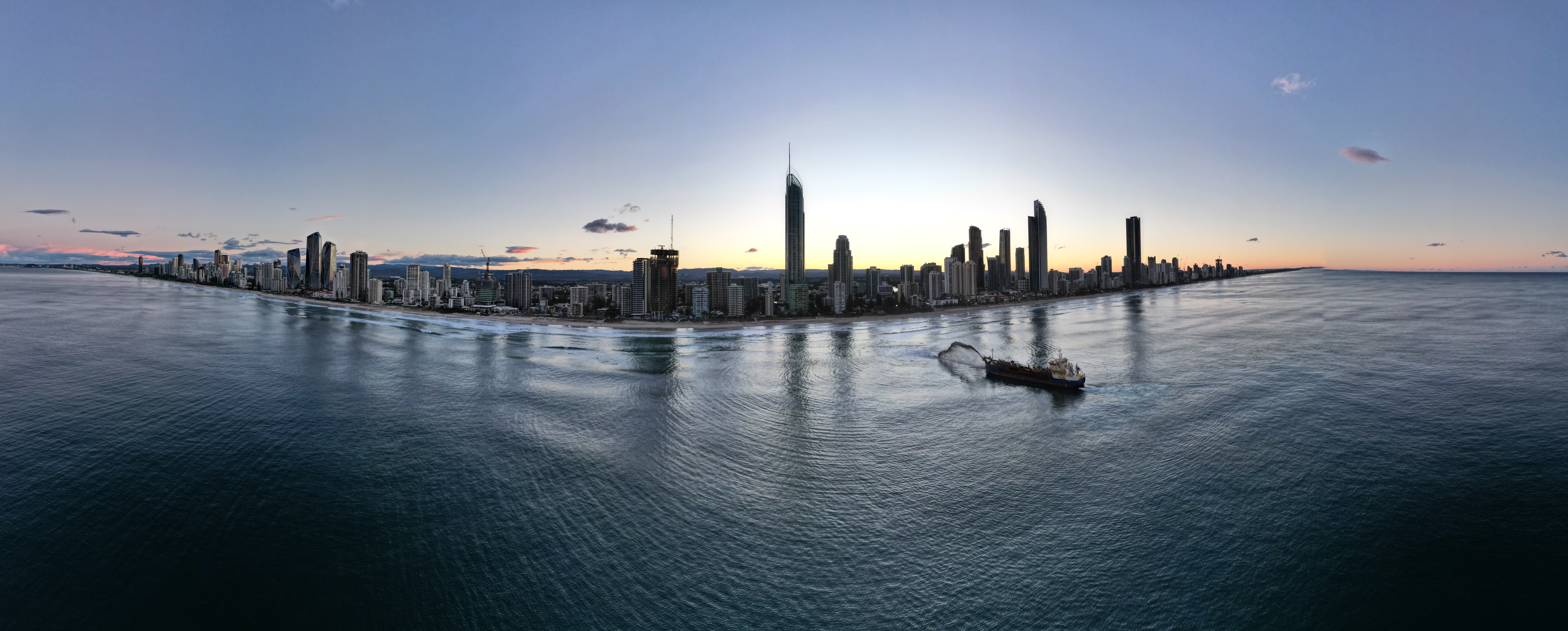
Gold Coast beach sunset panorama

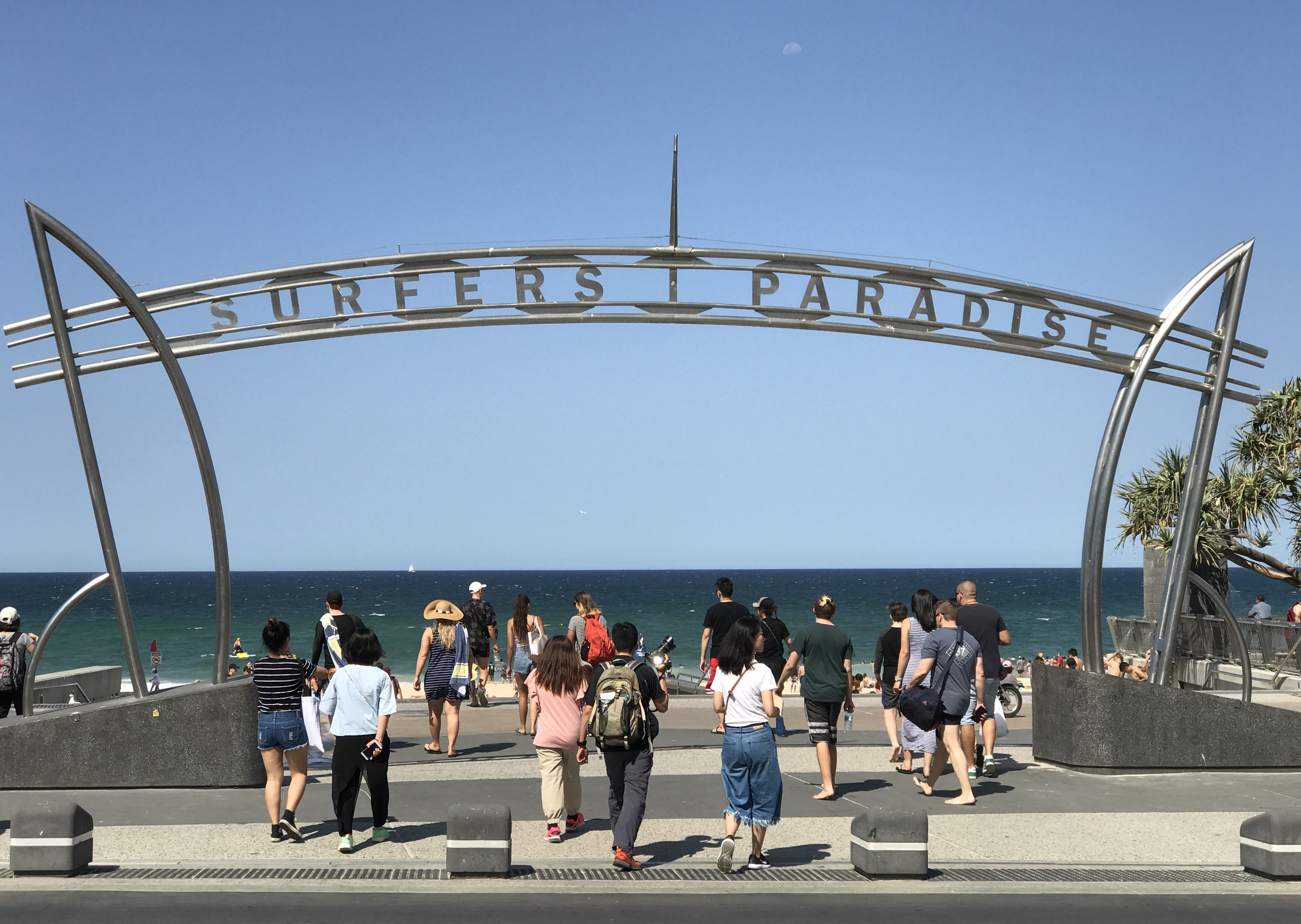
The entrance to Surfers Paradise beach

The city consists of 70 kilometres (43 mi) of coastline, with some of the most popular surf breaks in Australia and the world, including South Stradbroke Island, The Spit, Main Beach, Surfers Paradise, Broadbeach, Mermaid Beach, Nobby's Beach, Miami, North Burleigh Beach, Burleigh Beach, Burleigh Heads, Tallebudgera Beach, Palm Beach, South Palm Beach, Currumbin Beach, Tugun, Bilinga, North Kirra Beach Kirra, Coolangatta, Greenmount, Rainbow Bay, Snapper Rocks and Froggies Beach. There is almost 42 km of unbroken beachfront. Duranbah Beach is one of the world's best-known surfing beaches and is often thought of as being part of Gold Coast City, but is actually just across the New South Wales state border in the Tweed Shire.

There are also beaches along many of the Gold Coast's 860 km (530 mi) of navigable tidal waterways. Popular inland beaches include Southport, Budds Beach, Marine Stadium, Currumbin Alley, Tallebudgera Estuary, Jacobs Well, Jabiru Island, Paradise Point, Harley Park Labrador, Santa Barbara, Boykambil and Evandale Lake.

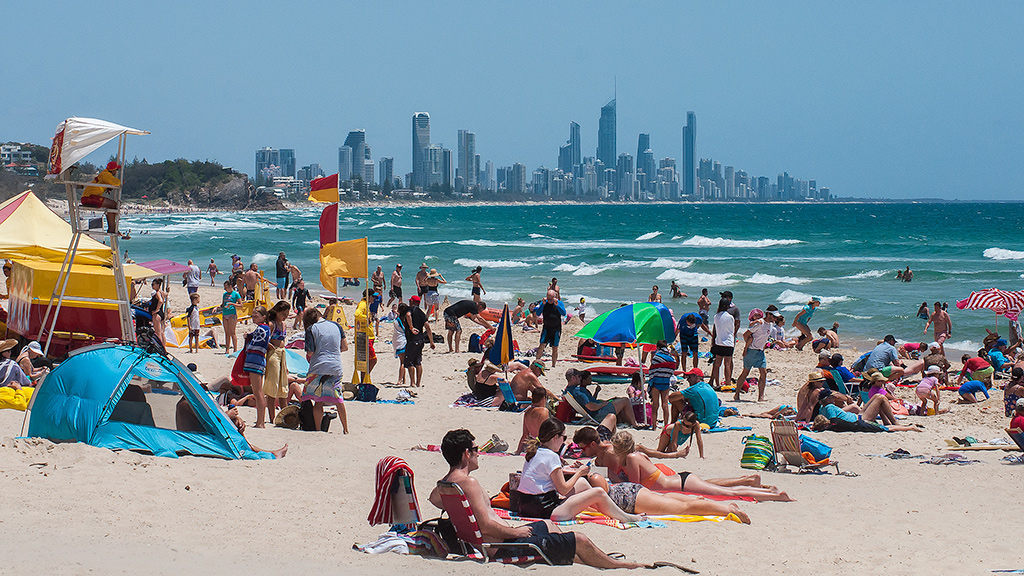
Burleigh Heads beach with Surfers Paradise skyline visible on the horizon

Beach safety and management

The Gold Coast has Australia's largest professional surf lifesaving service to protect people on the beaches and to promote surf safety throughout the community. The Queensland Department of Primary Industries carries out the Queensland Shark Control Program (SCP) to protect swimmers from sharks. Sharks are caught by using nets and baited drumlines off the major swimming beaches. Even with the SCP, sharks do range within sight of the patrolled beaches. Lifeguards will clear swimmers from the water if it is considered that there is a safety risk.

Gold Coast beaches have experienced periods of severe beach erosion. In 1967, a series of 11 cyclones removed most of the sand from Gold Coast beaches. The Government of Queensland engaged engineers from Delft University in the Netherlands to advise what to do about the beach erosion. The Delft Report was published in 1971 and outlined a series of works for Gold Coast Beaches including Gold Coast Seaway, works at Narrow Neck that resulted in the Northern Gold Coast Beach Protection Strategy and works at the Tweed River that became the Tweed River Entrance Sand Bypassing Project.

By 2005, most of the recommendations of the 1971 Delft Report had been implemented. City of Gold Coast commenced implementation of the Palm Beach Protection Strategy but ran into considerable opposition from the community participating in a NO REEF protest campaign. The City of Gold Coast Council then committed to completing a review of beach management practices to update the Delft Report. The Gold Coast Shoreline Management Plan will be delivered by organisations including the Environmental Protection Agency, City of Gold Coast and the Griffith Centre for Coastal Management. Gold Coast City is also investing in the quality and capacity of the Gold Coast Oceanway that provides sustainable transport along Gold Coast beaches.

=== Climate ===
The Gold Coast experiences a humid subtropical climate (Köppen climate classification Cfa), with mild to warm winters and hot, humid summers. The city experiences substantial summer precipitation mostly concentrated in thunderstorms and heavy showers with rain events occasionally lasting up to a few weeks at a time, while winter is pleasantly mild to warm with little rain. In fact, it is for this pleasant winter weather that both the city and the Sunshine Coast—the coastal region north of Brisbane—are internationally renowned. Extreme temperatures recorded at Gold Coast Seaway have ranged from 2.5 °C (36 °F) on 19 July 2007 to 40.5 °C (105 °F) on 22 February 2005, although the city rarely experiences temperatures above 35 °C (95 °F) in summer or below 5 °C (41 °F) in winter. The average temperature of the sea at Surfers Paradise ranges from 21.5 °C (70.7 °F) in July and August to 27.1 °C (80.8 °F) in February.

Climate data for Gold Coast, Seaway (1992–2020)
Month	Jan	Feb	Mar	Apr	May	Jun	Jul	Aug	Sep	Oct	Nov	Dec	Year
Record high °C (°F)	38.5 (101.3)	40.5 (104.9)	36.3 (97.3)	33.3 (91.9)	29.4 (84.9)	27.1 (80.8)	28.9 (84.0)	32.4 (90.3)	33.0 (91.4)	38.0 (100.4)	35.5 (95.9)	39.4 (102.9)	40.5 (104.9)
Mean maximum °C (°F)	33.2 (91.8)	32.7 (90.9)	32.5 (90.5)	29.7 (85.5)	26.9 (80.4)	24.9 (76.8)	25.1 (77.2)	26.5 (79.7)	29.1 (84.4)	31.3 (88.3)	31.8 (89.2)	33.3 (91.9)	35.6 (96.1)
Mean daily maximum °C (°F)	28.9 (84.0)	28.7 (83.7)	28.0 (82.4)	26.1 (79.0)	23.6 (74.5)	21.4 (70.5)	21.3 (70.3)	22.1 (71.8)	24.0 (75.2)	25.4 (77.7)	26.9 (80.4)	28.0 (82.4)	25.4 (77.7)
Daily mean °C (°F)	25.4 (77.7)	25.2 (77.4)	24.5 (76.1)	22.2 (72.0)	19.5 (67.1)	17.3 (63.1)	16.7 (62.1)	17.3 (63.1)	19.4 (66.9)	21.1 (70.0)	23.0 (73.4)	24.2 (75.6)	21.3 (70.4)
Mean daily minimum °C (°F)	21.9 (71.4)	21.8 (71.2)	20.9 (69.6)	18.3 (64.9)	15.4 (59.7)	13.3 (55.9)	12.0 (53.6)	12.5 (54.5)	14.8 (58.6)	16.9 (62.4)	19.0 (66.2)	20.5 (68.9)	17.3 (63.1)
Mean minimum °C (°F)	18.8 (65.8)	19.3 (66.7)	17.6 (63.7)	14.4 (57.9)	10.5 (50.9)	7.9 (46.2)	7.1 (44.8)	7.7 (45.9)	10.5 (50.9)	12.5 (54.5)	15.1 (59.2)	17.0 (62.6)	6.3 (43.3)
Record low °C (°F)	16.7 (62.1)	17.2 (63.0)	13.4 (56.1)	8.9 (48.0)	6.6 (43.9)	3.8 (38.8)	2.5 (36.5)	4.2 (39.6)	7.9 (46.2)	9.4 (48.9)	13.2 (55.8)	14.7 (58.5)	2.5 (36.5)
Average precipitation mm (inches)	136.7 (5.38)	183.4 (7.22)	134.0 (5.28)	118.7 (4.67)	97.6 (3.84)	113.9 (4.48)	49.5 (1.95)	54.8 (2.16)	41.2 (1.62)	87.4 (3.44)	106.7 (4.20)	135.4 (5.33)	1,254.7 (49.40)
Average precipitation days (≥ 1 mm)	8.8	8.3	9.0	8.6	8.1	7.2	7.0	6.3	5.1	6.3	8.0	9.3	92
Average afternoon relative humidity (%)	70	70	68	65	62	58	55	56	62	66	68	69	64
Average dew point °C (°F)	20.5 (68.9)	20.7 (69.3)	19.3 (66.7)	16.7 (62.1)	13.8 (56.8)	11.0 (51.8)	9.8 (49.6)	10.4 (50.7)	13.2 (55.8)	15.5 (59.9)	17.3 (63.1)	18.9 (66.0)	15.6 (60.1)
Source: Bureau of Meteorology

== Government ==
Administratively, the Gold Coast is a local government area called the City of Gold Coast. The City of Gold Coast Council has 14 elected councillors, each representing a division of the city. Businessman Tom Tate is the current Mayor of the Gold Coast, first elected in 2012. Former mayors include Ron Clarke, Gary Baildon, Lex Bell, Ray Stevens, Ern Harley and Sir Bruce Small, who was responsible for the development of many of the canal estates that are now home to thousands of Gold Coast residents.

At the state level, the Gold Coast area is represented by eleven members in the Legislative Assembly of Queensland. The seats they hold are: Bonney, Broadwater, Burleigh, Coomera, Currumbin, Gaven, Mermaid Beach, Mudgeeraba, Southport, Surfers Paradise and Theodore. Federally, the Gold Coast area is split between five divisions in the House of Representatives: Fadden (northern), Moncrieff (central) and McPherson (southern) are located entirely within the Gold Coast, while Forde (north-west) and Wright (south-west) encompass parts of the Gold Coast and other areas of Southeast Queensland.

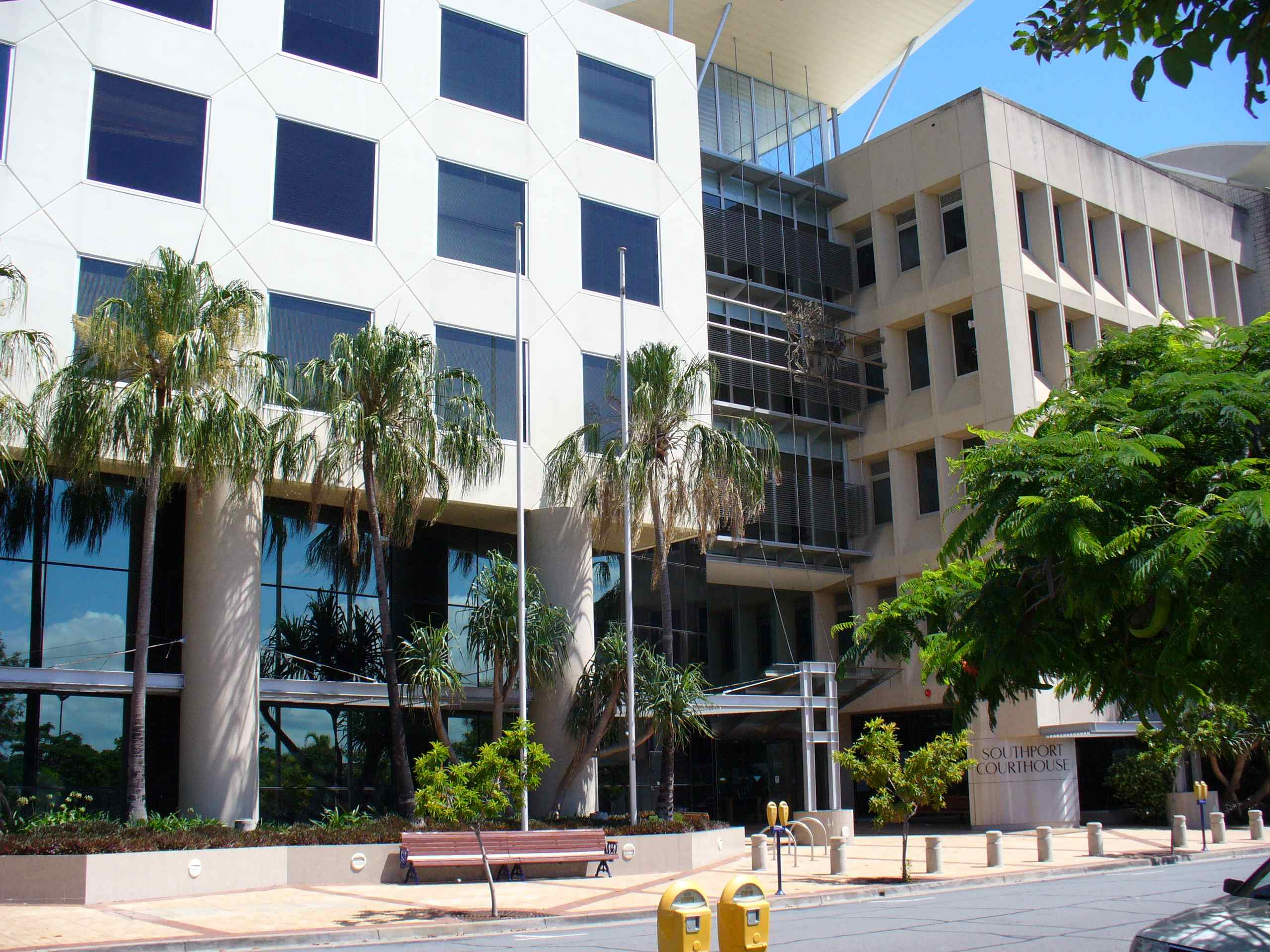
Southport Courthouse

Politically, the Gold Coast has often tilted conservative. It was a Country Party bastion for most of the first three decades after World War II, but increasing urbanisation has made it a Liberal stronghold. Labor has historically only done well around Labrador and Coolangatta. Only one Labor MP has ever represented a significant portion of the Gold Coast at the federal level since 1949; the three Gold Coast divisions have only returned Liberals since 1984. At the state level, Labor was fairly competitive in the Gold Coast for most of the early part of the 21st century. However, as part of its massive landslide in the 2012 state election, the Liberal National Party won every seat there. The LNP repeated its sweep of the Gold Coast seats at the 2015 election, and retained all but one Gold Coast seat at the 2017 state election.

Southport Courthouse is the city's major courthouse and has jurisdiction to hear petty criminal offences and civil matters up to A$250,000. Indictable offences, criminal sentencing and civil matters above A$250,000 are heard in the higher Supreme Court of Queensland, which is located in Brisbane. There is also a subsidiary Magistrates Court, located in the southern suburb of Coolangatta.

In 2013, a brawl between members of Outlaw motorcycle gangs, also called "bikies," who fought each other outside a Broadbeach restaurant caused mass fear among restaurant patrons and police. This led to the toughest anti-bikie laws introduced in Australia known as Vicious Lawless Association Disestablishment Act 2013.

== Economy ==
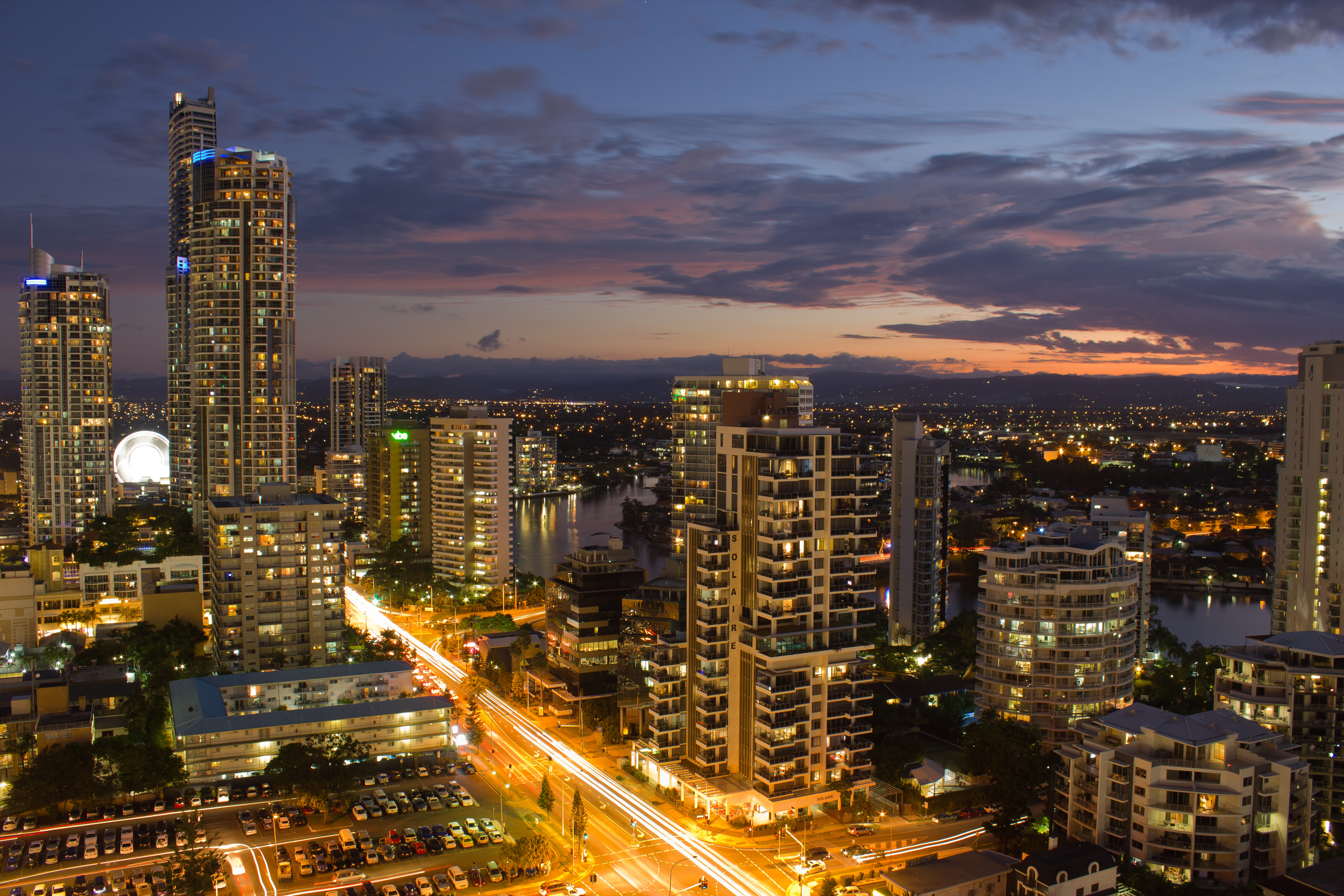
Gold Coast CBD, 2011

In fifty years, Gold Coast City has grown from a small beachside holiday destination to Australia's sixth largest city (and the country's most populous non-capital city). Situated within South East Queensland's growth corridor, the Gold Coast is one of Australia's fastest-growing large cities, with a 5-year annual average population growth rate to 2015 of 1.8%, compared to 1.5% nationally. Gross Regional Product has risen from A$9.7 billion in 2001, to A$15.6 billion in 2008, a rise of 61 percent. Tourism remains fundamental to Gold Coast City's economy, with almost 10 million visitors a year to the area. In the past, the population-derived industries of construction, tourism and retail drove the economy. Some diversification has taken place, with the city now having an industrial base formed of marine, education, information communication and technology, food, tourism, creative, environment and sports industries. These nine industries have been identified as the key industries by the City of Gold Coast Council to deliver the city's economic prosperity. Gold Coast City's unemployment rate (5.6 percent) is below the national level (5.9 percent). The declaration of Southport as the Gold Coast central business district (CBD) and a Priority Development Area (PDA), as well as new investment into the CBD, is driving transformative change and creating new business and investment opportunities.

The Gold Coast Economic Development Strategy 2013–2023 outlines the framework for the city's long-term growth and prosperity. The strategy outlines actions in the following areas: Innovation, Culture, Infrastructure, Competitive business, Workforce, International.

=== Tourism ===
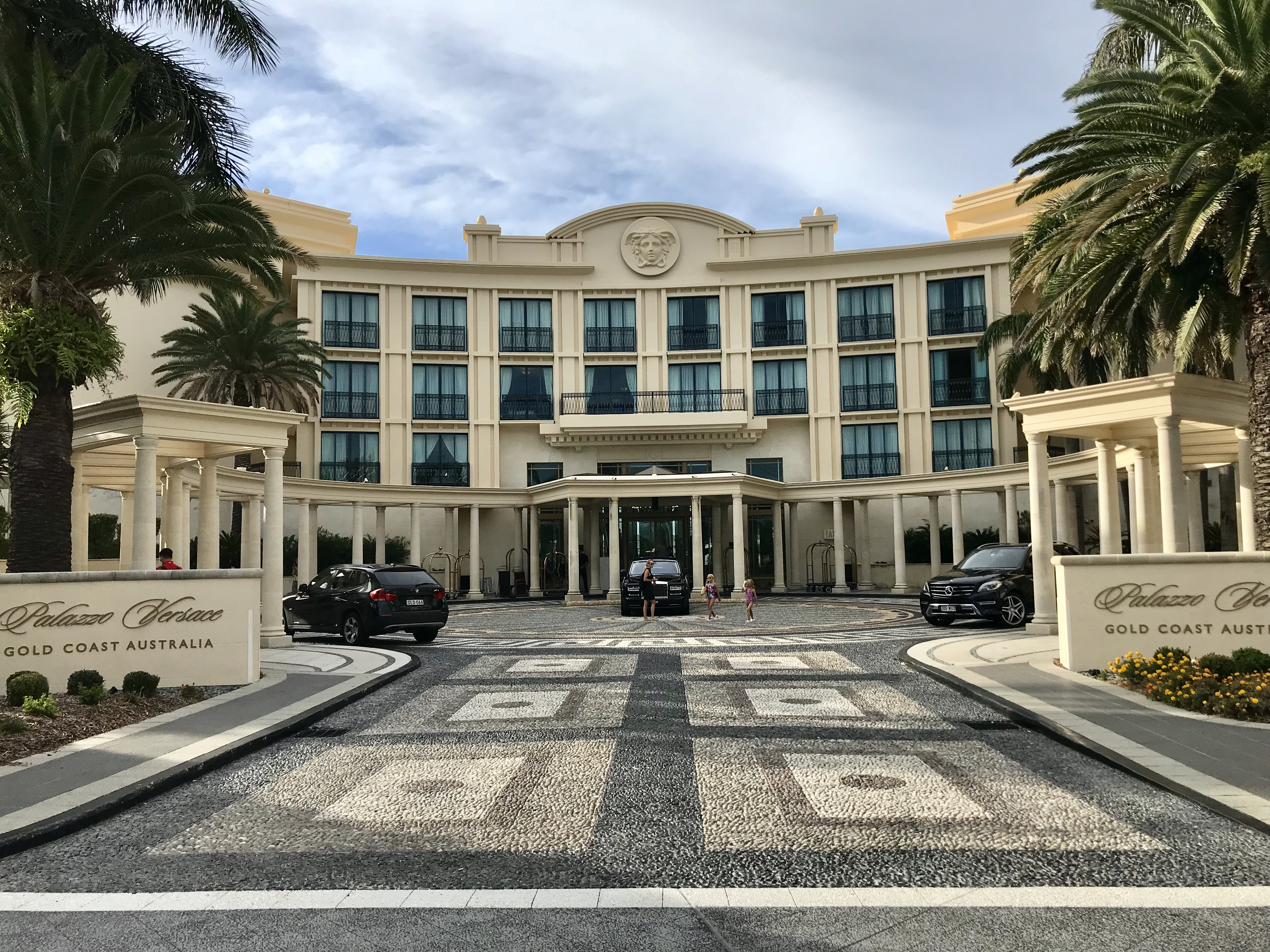
The hospitality industry contributes significantly to the Gold Coast's economy. The Palazzo Versace is a notable hotel on Main Beach.

The Gold Coast is the most popular tourist destination in Queensland. It is Australia's 5th most visited destination by international tourists. Around 10 million tourists visit the Gold Coast area every year consisting of 849,114 international visitors, 3,468,000 domestic overnight visitors and 5,366,000 daytrip visitors. Tourism is the region's biggest industry, directly contributing more than $4.4 billion into the city economy every year and directly accounting for one in four jobs in the city There are approximately 65,000 beds, 60 kilometres (37 mi) of beach, 600 kilometres (370 mi) of canal, 100,000 hectares of nature reserve, 500 restaurants, 40 golf courses and five major theme parks in the city.

Gold Coast Airport provides connection across Australia and internationally with airlines including Jetstar, Qantas, Air New Zealand, Scoot, Virgin Australia and Airasia X. Brisbane Airport is less than one hour from the centre of Gold Coast, and direct trains operate.

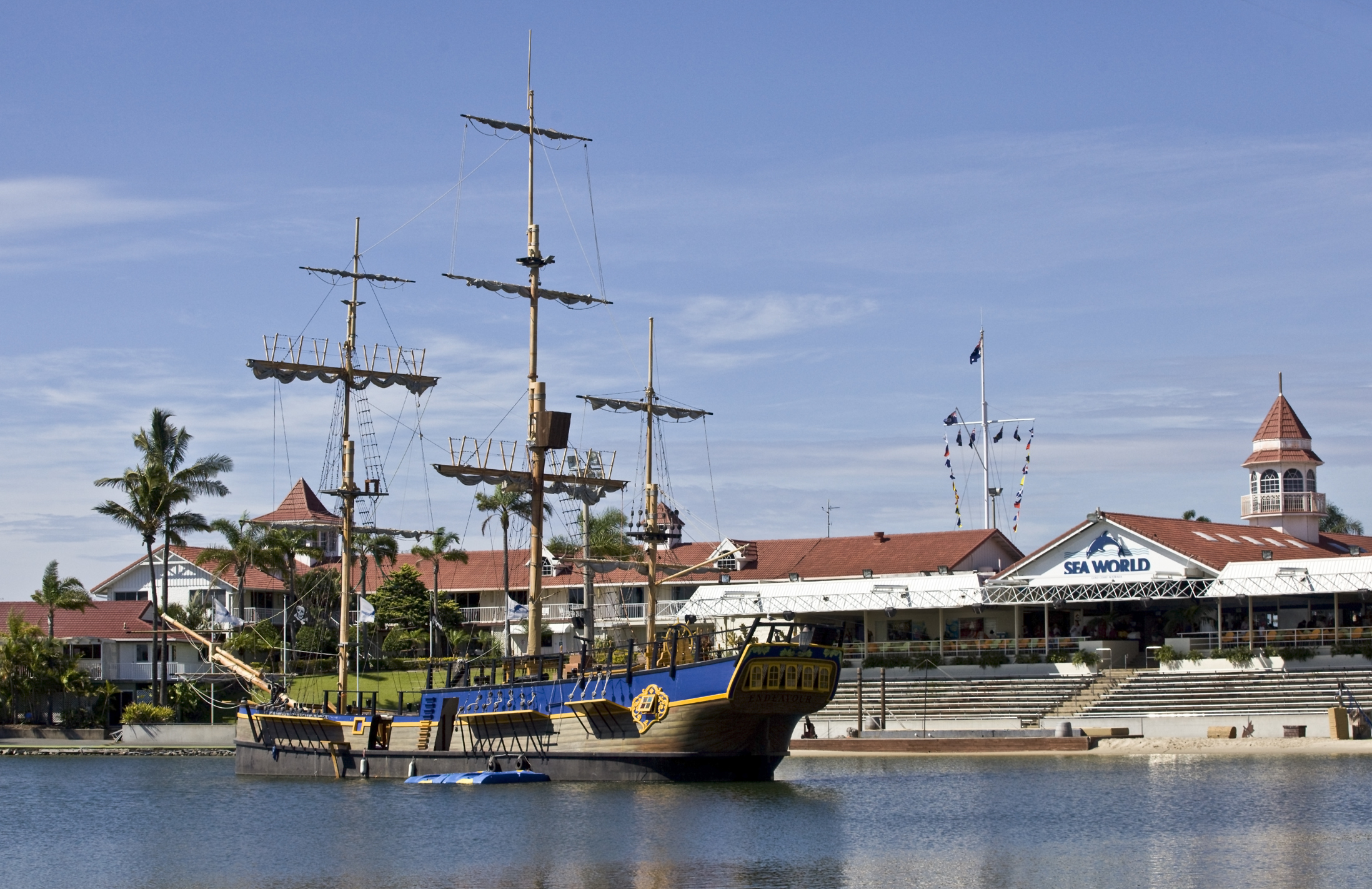
Sea World, one of many theme parks on the Gold Coast

Gold Coast City has over 13,000 available guest rooms contributing over $335 million to the local economy each year. Accommodation options available range from hostels to five-star resorts and hotels. Tourist attractions include surf beaches. The big attractions are the numerous theme parks in the area. Theme parks include Dreamworld, Sea World, Wet'n'Wild Water World, Warner Bros. Movie World, WhiteWater World, Topgolf, Currumbin Wildlife Sanctuary, David Fleay Wildlife Park, Australian Outback Spectacular, and Paradise Country.

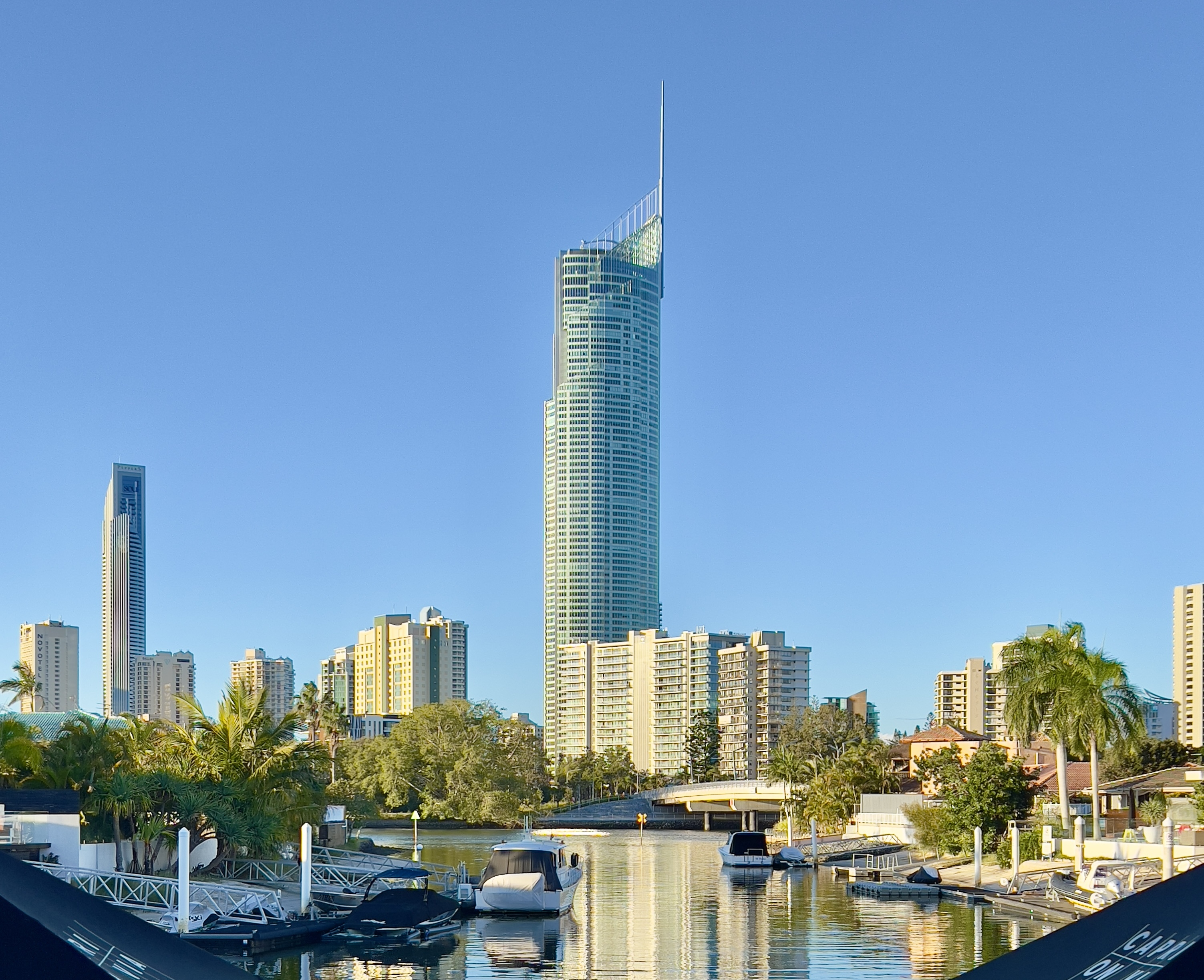
Q1, the tallest building in Australia and the world's tallest residential building upon completion in 2005 (currently the seventeenth tallest)

Since the opening of what was then the world's highest residential tower in 2005 (it is now the 17th highest), the Q1 building has been a destination for tourists and locals alike. It is the second-highest public vantage point in the Southern Hemisphere after the Eureka Tower in Melbourne. The observation deck at level 77 is the highest of its kind in Queensland and offers views in all directions, from Brisbane to Byron Bay. It towers over the Surfers Paradise skyline, with the observation deck 230 metres (750 feet) high, and the spire extending nearly another hundred metres up. In total, the Q1 is 322.5 metres (1,058 feet) high, making it the tallest building in Australia. Another famous tourist attraction is the Surfers Paradise Meter Maids, instituted in 1965 to put a positive spin on new parking regulations. To avoid tickets being issued for expired parking, the Meter Maids dispense coins into the meter and leave a calling card under the windscreen wiper of the vehicle. The Maids are still a part of the Surfers Paradise culture, but the scheme is now run by private enterprise.

Chinatown, Gold Coast, is an integral part of the revitalisation of Southport as an international CBD.

=== Film production ===
The Gold Coast is the major film production hub in Queensland. It has accounted for 75% of all film production in Queensland since the 1990s, with an expenditure of around $150 million per year. The Gold Coast is the third largest film production centre in Australia, behind Sydney and Melbourne.

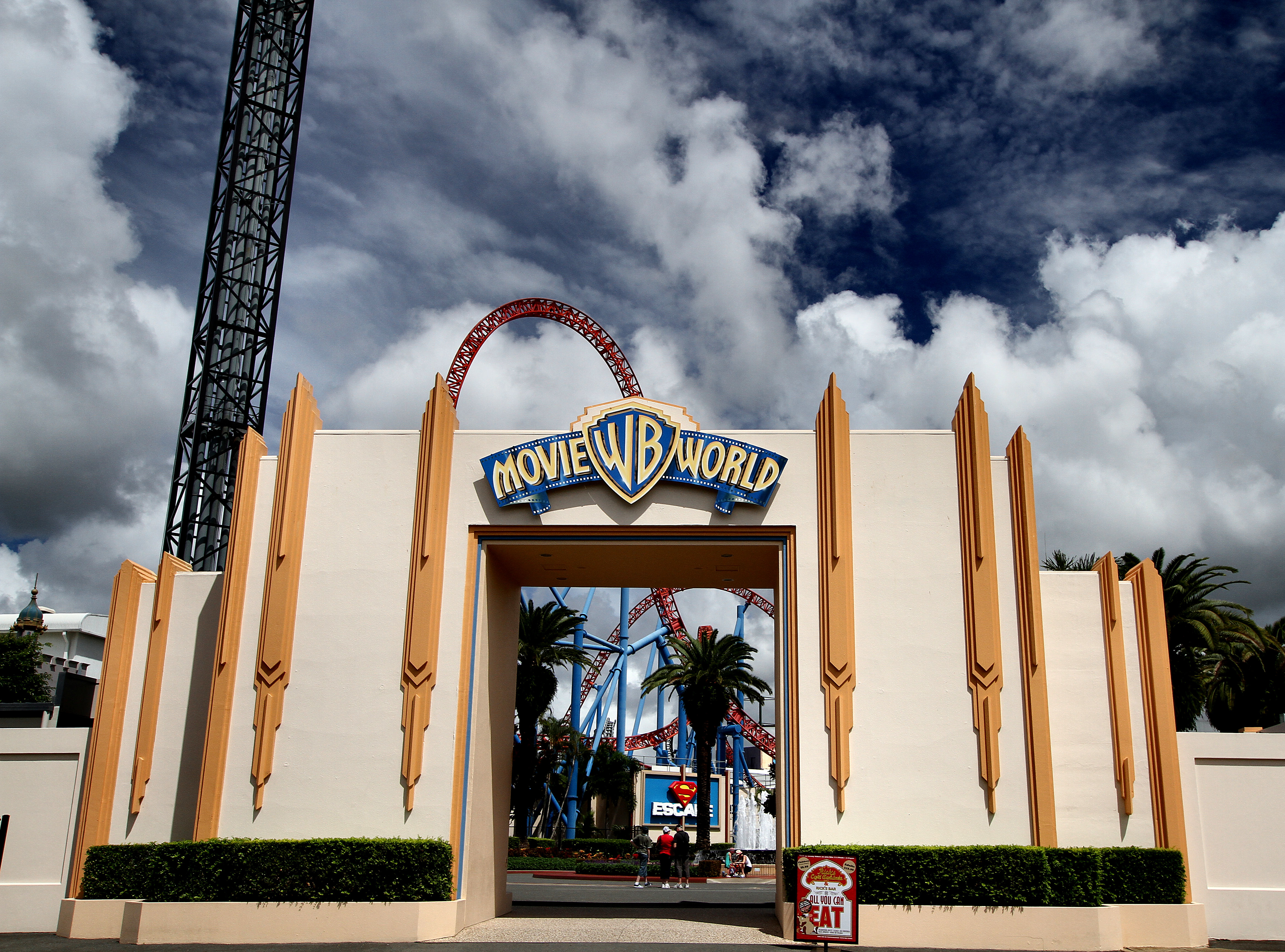
Warner Bros. Movie World

It is the filming site for major motion pictures including Muriel's Wedding (1994), Ghost Ship (2002), Scooby-Doo (2002), House of Wax (2005), Superman Returns (2006), Unbroken (2014), The Inbetweeners 2 (2014), San Andreas (2015), Pirates of the Caribbean: Dead Men Tell No Tales (2017), Kong: Skull Island (2017), Thor: Ragnarok (2017), Pacific Rim: Uprising (2018), Aquaman (2018), Dora the Explorer (2019) and Godzilla vs. Kong (2021).

Village Roadshow Studios are adjacent to the Warner Bros. Movie World Theme Park at Oxenford. The Studios consist of eight sound stages, production offices, editing rooms, wardrobe, construction workshops, water tanks and commissary. These sound stages vary in size and have an overall floor area of 10,844 sq metres, making Warner Roadshow Studios one of the largest studio lots in the Southern Hemisphere. The Queensland Government actively supports the film and television production industry in Queensland and provides both non-financial and financial assistance through the Pacific Film and Television Commission. The Park used to be another film studio.

== Culture ==
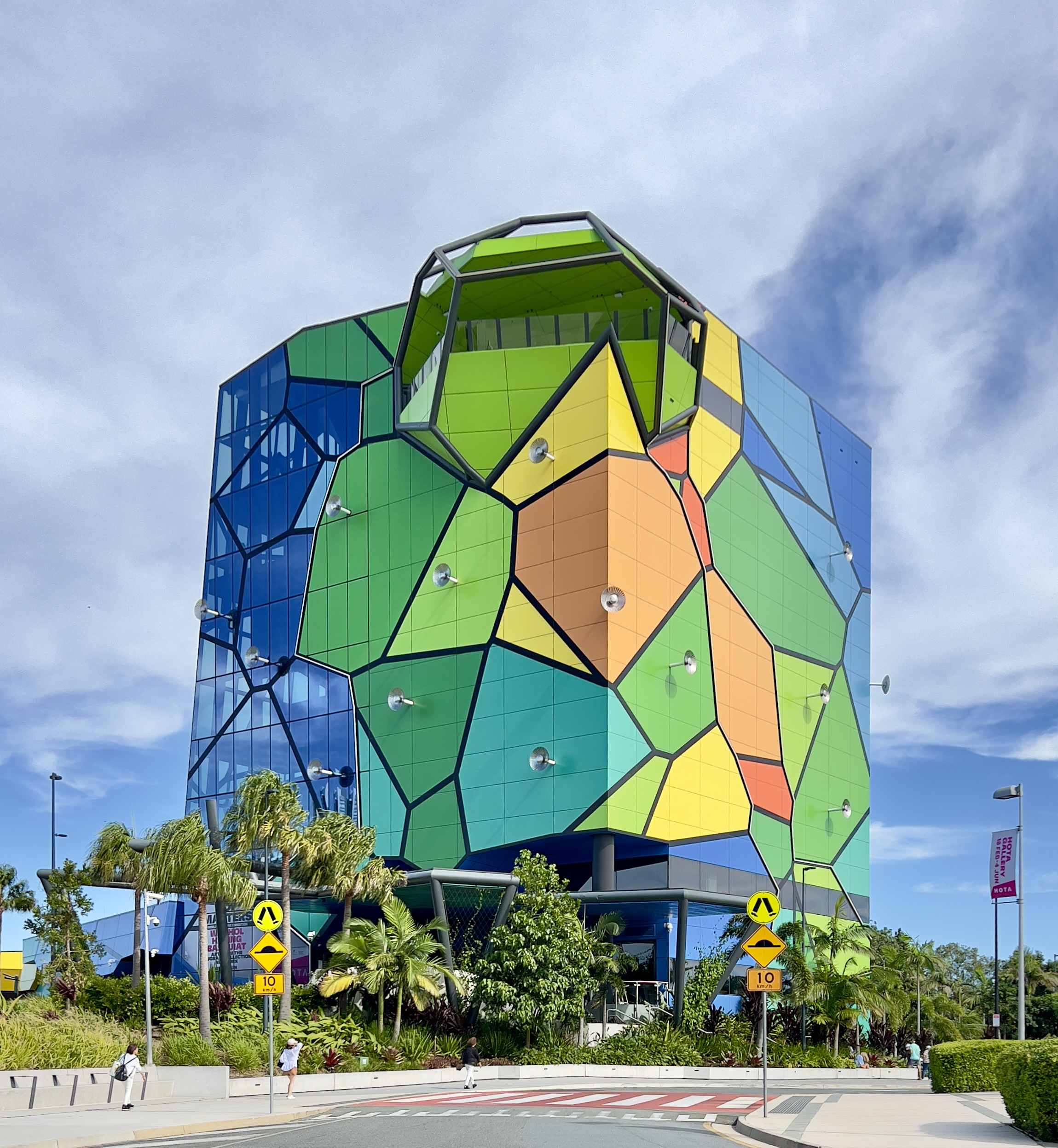
Home of the Arts

The Gold Coast's culture has been affected by rapid development and traditional marketing programs orbiting around 'sun, sand, surf and sex.'

Despite rapid socio-economic changes and a tourist-centred image, there is evidence of local resident-driven culture (such as surf gangs) in geographical pockets and a broader 'Gold Coaster' identity drawn from globalised resort and real estate marketing material. The Gold Coast hosts cultural activities that attract tourists and residents alike.

=== Music ===
Music groups in this region include the Northern Rivers Symphony Orchestra and Operator Please. Musicians Cody Simpson and Ricki-Lee Coulter are from the Gold Coast. Music events include Big Day Out, Good Vibrations Festival, Summafieldayze, the Blues on Broadbeach Festival and V Festival (2007–2009).

=== Arts ===
Home of the Arts (HOTA) is the Gold Coast's premier cultural facility for visual and performing arts with a performance theatre, two cinemas and an underground venue. The theatre has hosted performances by the Imperial Russian Ballet, The Australian Ballet and the Queensland Ballet. Musicals, plays and a variety of performances are regularly scheduled. The city is also home to the Gold Coast City Art Gallery. Film festivals and the Comedy Club host international artists. A redeveloped Gold Coast cultural precinct opened before the city hosted the 2018 Commonwealth Games.

== Sport ==
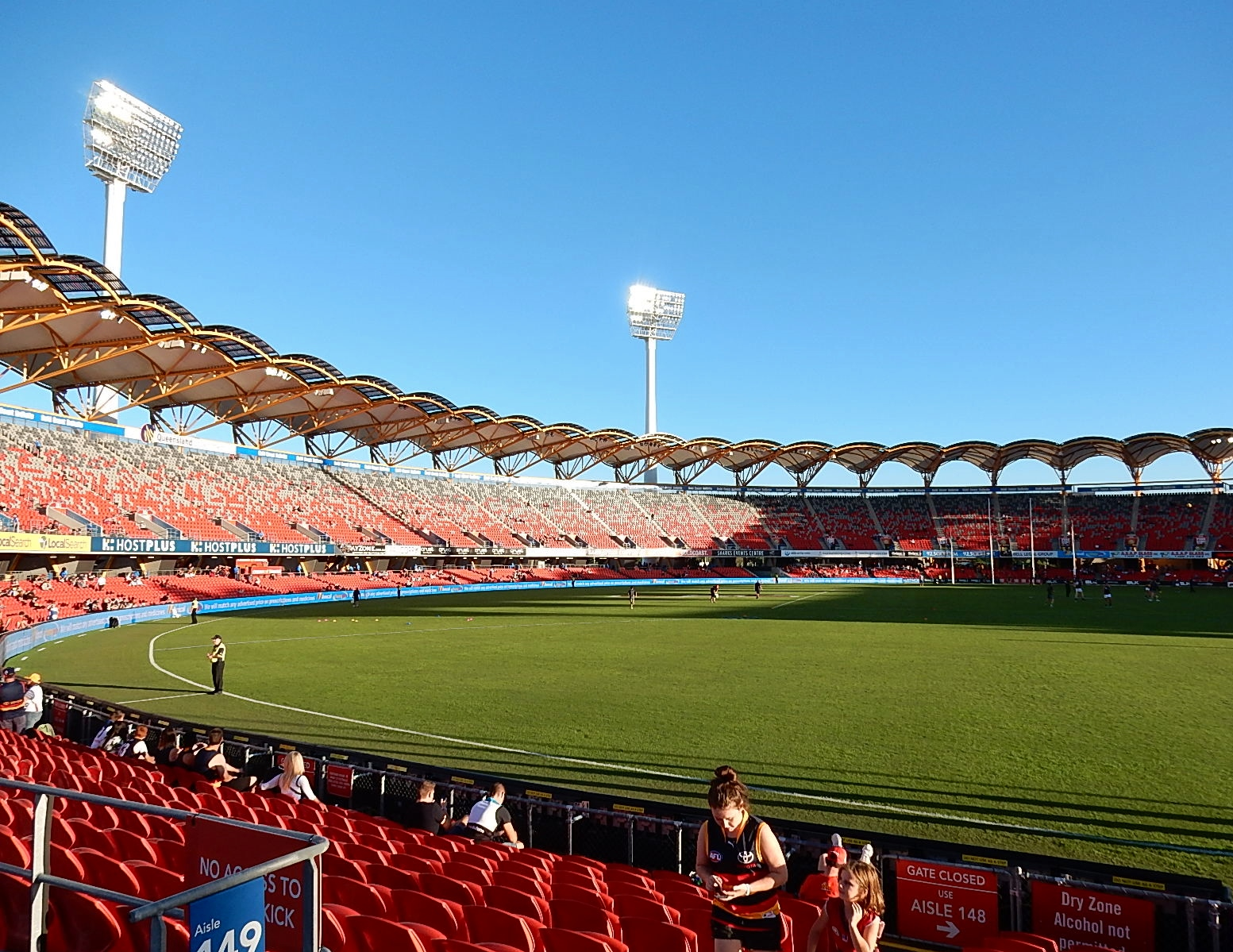
People First Stadium, home of the Gold Coast Suns in the Australian Football League

The two most popular sports on the Gold Coast are Australian rules football and rugby league, of which the city is represented by professional teams in the two most popular national competitions:

Team name	Competition	Sport	Years
Gold Coast Titans	National Rugby League	Rugby league football	2007–present
Gold Coast Suns	Australian Football League	Australian rules football	2011–present

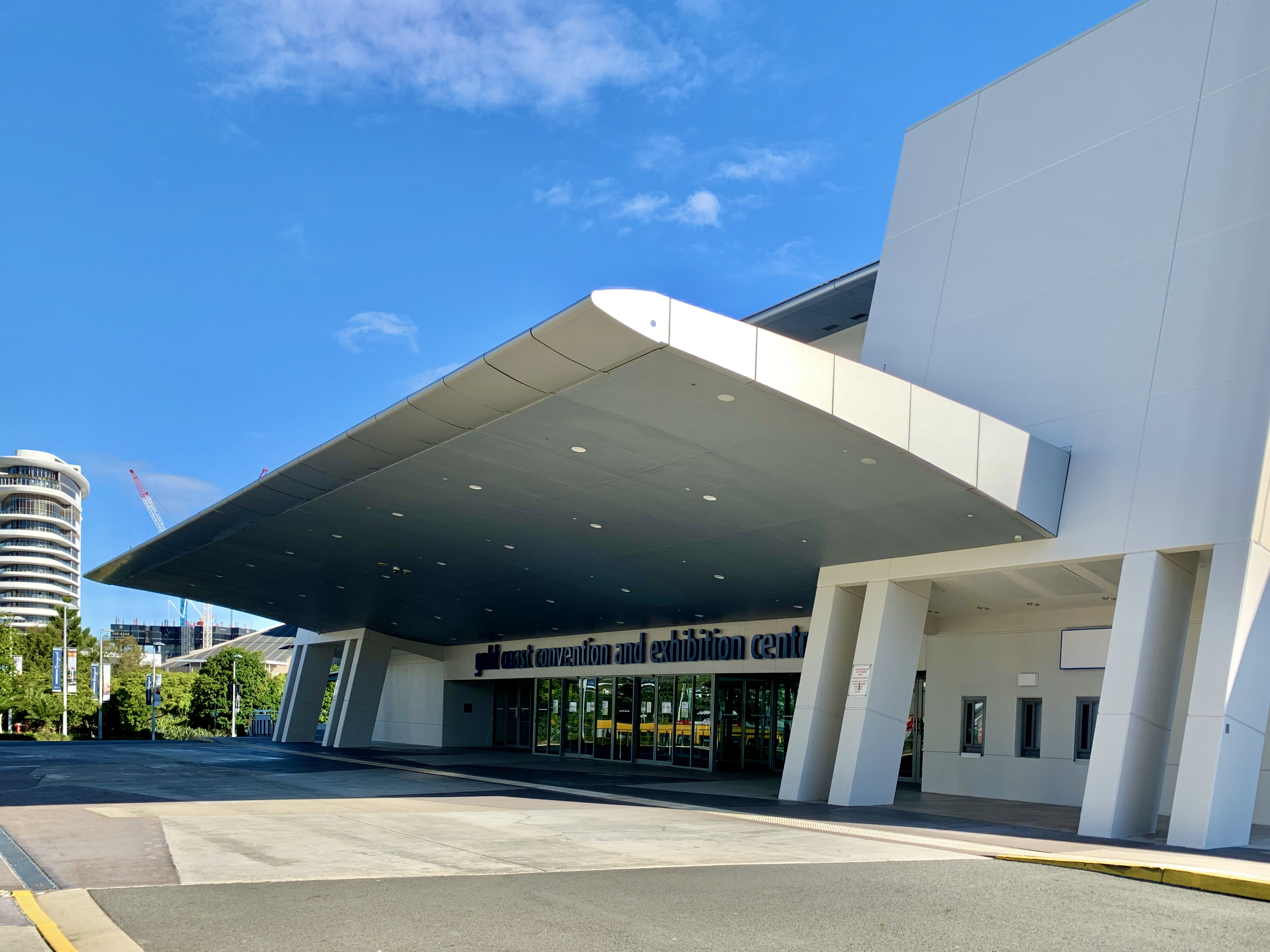
Gold Coast Convention & Exhibition Centre

Burleigh Bears rugby league football club plays in the Queensland Cup and has won four premierships (in 1999, 2004, 2016 and 2019).

Recreational activities on the Gold Coast include surfing, fishing, cycling, boating and golf. The Gold Coast area has numerous golf links, including Hope Island, Sanctuary Cove and The Glades.

Sporting facilities include the Carrara Stadium, Carrara Indoor Sport Centre, Nerang Velodrome and the Sports Super Centre. Newer facilities such as the Gold Coast Sports and Leisure Centre, Runaway Bay Indoor Sports Stadium, Pimpama Sports Hub, and the Gold Coast Sports Precinct have been built to accommodate the growing population.

Former World Wrestling Entertainment performer Nathan Jones comes from the Gold Coast, as do Olympic gold medal-winning swimmer Grant Hackett, 2011 US Open tennis champion Samantha Stosur and Sally Pearson (who received the keys to the city).

The Gold Coast has garnered a reputation as a "sporting graveyard", as many of the professional clubs that have represented the Gold Coast in national leagues since the 1980s experience generally poor on-field performances, consistently struggle to support themselves financially, and have generally folded within a decade of being founded; as of 2019 no Gold Coast-based team has won a premiership in a national professional club competition. However, The Gold Coast Suns entered their first AFL Finals series in 2025 but lost in the semi finals against cross town rivals Brisbane Lions at The Gabba.

=== Commonwealth Games ===
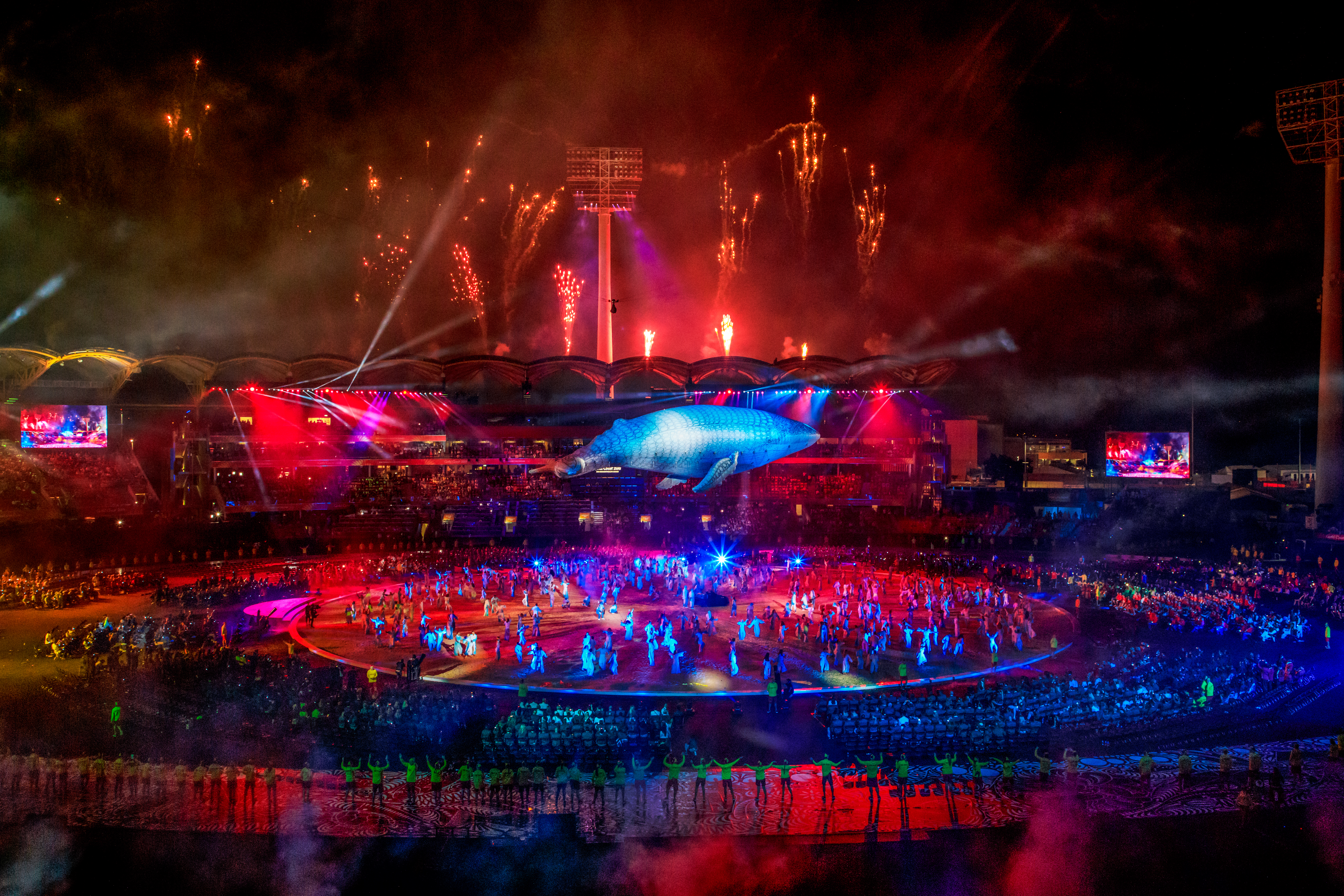
Opening ceremony of the 2018 Commonwealth Games at the Carrara Stadium

The Gold Coast hosted the 2018 Commonwealth Games, an international multi-sport event for members of the Commonwealth, held between 4 and 15 April 2018. It was the fifth time Australia had hosted the Commonwealth Games and the first time a major multi-sport event achieved gender equality by having an equal number of events for male and female athletes. More than 4,400 athletes, including 300 para-athletes, from 71 Commonwealth Games Associations took part in the event.

The venues such as Carrara Stadium, Carrara Sports and Leisure Centre, Carrara Indoor Sports Stadium, Gold Coast Convention & Exhibition Centre. Broadbeach Bowls Club Nerang Mountain Bike Trails, Coomera Indoor Sports Centre, Oxenford Studios, The Gold Coast Hockey Centre, Southport Broadwater Parklands, Gold Coast Aquatic Centre, Robina Stadium, The Currumbin Beachfront, and Coolangatta Beachfront were used for the Games.

=== Olympic and Paralympic Games ===
Gold Coast will be one of the three zones for the 2032 Summer Olympics and 2032 Summer Paralympics in Brisbane, using the venues as at the 2018 Commonwealth Games. The Gold Coast Zone will have seven venues and will host nine Olympic and six Paralympic sports. The Gold Coast Convention & Exhibition Centre will be used for the preliminary Volleyball, along with Powerlifting and Sitting Volleyball during the Paralympics. Broadbeach Park Stadium will host Beach Volleyball for the Olympics as well as 5-a-side football in the Paralympics. The Gold Coast Sports and Leisure Centre will be used for Judo and Wrestling in the Olympics and Boccia in the Paralympics. Southport Broadwater Parklands will be used for Triathlon and Marathon Swimming in the Olympics and will be used for Paratriathlon in the Paralympics. Coomera Indoor Sports Centre will host the Volleyball for the Olympics and will be used for Wheelchair Rugby in the Paralympics. The Robina Stadium will host the preliminary football matches. The Carrara Stadium could potentially host the Cricket matches if the IOC approves cricket in the 2028 Olympic Games in Los Angeles.

=== Other events ===
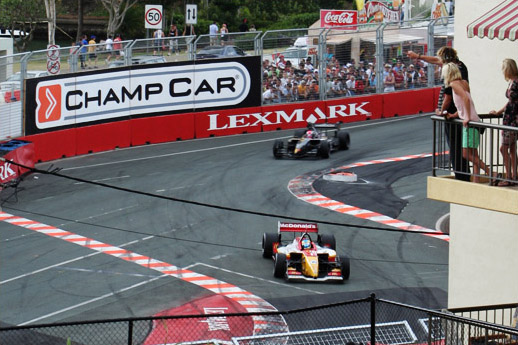
Gold Coast Indy 300

The Gold Coast 500 (formerly known as the Gold Coast 600 & Gold Coast Indy 300) is a car racing event held annually, usually in October. The race runs on the Surfers Paradise Street Circuit through the streets of Surfers Paradise and Main Beach. The Gold Coast 500 typically is accompanied by a range of on- and off-track events such as the Indy Undie Ball, Miss Indy Competition and the King of Burleigh Hill Billy cart Race, which take place in the week prior to and/or during the race weekend. Formerly an IndyCar event, V8 Supercars are now the headline attraction, using a shorter track route, as the circuit was limited following the construction of the Gold Coast Light Rail as the Light Rail line replaced the northbound traffic lanes on Surfers Paradise Boulevard, which was previously used as the southern section of the street circuit.

Each June, Coolangatta hosts Cooly Rocks On, a two-week 1950s and 1960s nostalgia festival with free entertainment and attractions, including hot rods, restored cars and revival bands playing music of the era. Every July, more than 25,000 congregate on the Gold Coast from around the world to participate in the Gold Coast Marathon. It is also the largest annual community sporting event held on the Gold Coast. In 2015, it will be held on 4–5 July, and the 37th Gold Coast Airport Marathon is set to motivate and challenge more than 25,000 people of all ages and abilities. The Gold Coast Airport Marathon will feature an event for all ages and abilities, including the full Gold Coast Airport Marathon, ASICS Half Marathon, Southern Cross University 10 kilometres (6.2 mi) Run, Suncorp Bank 5.7 kilometres (3.5 mi) Challenge, and Junior Dash over 4 and 2 kilometres (2.5 and 1.2 mi).

In August, Currumbin hosts the annual half-distance Challenge Gold Coast triathlon, with the 1.9 km swim taking place in the Currumbin River, the 90 km bike going through the Currumbin and Tallebudgera Valleys in the Hinterland, and the 21.1 km run going along the beach to Elephant Rock and Tugun.

Late November to early December sees thousands of school leavers across the country descend on the Gold Coast for Schoolies week, two weeks of celebration and parties throughout Surfers Paradise, hosted by the City of Gold Coast. The event is often criticised nationally and locally for its portrayal of drinking and acts of violence; however, every effort by the Queensland Police Service and State Government to ensure all school leavers have a good time is put into place, including locals volunteering by walking the streets and keeping an eye out for those in need of assistance.

Early each year, the Gold Coast hosts one leg of the ASP World Tour of surfing, where some of the world's best surfers compete in the Quiksilver Pro at Coolangatta.

Home of the Arts, Gold Coast, located in Evandale, features a fine art gallery featuring local and international works from painting to sculpture and new media. In addition, there is a theatre for live productions, including musicals, as well as two arts cinemas showing foreign and independent films from Australia and abroad.

Chinatown, Gold Coast, located in Southport, hosts the annual citywide Lunar New Year festival as well as regular monthly events.

== Media ==
=== Print ===
The daily local newspaper is the Gold Coast Bulletin, which is published by News Corporation. National surfing magazine Australia's Surfing Life is published in the Gold Coast suburb of Burleigh Heads by Morrison Media.

Major daily newspapers such as The Courier-Mail and its sibling The Sunday Mail from Brisbane, The Daily Telegraph, The Sunday Telegraph (Sydney), The Sydney Morning Herald and The Sun-Herald from Sydney, and The Age, The Sunday Age, The Herald Sun and the Sunday Herald-Sun from Melbourne, as well as national publications The Australian and The Australian Financial Review are all available for purchase on the Gold Coast. Other major interstate newspapers and newspapers from neighbouring regions owned by News Corporation or Australian Community Media are also available for purchase via retail outlets on the Gold Coast.

=== Television ===
The Gold Coast straddles the boundary between the television licence areas of both Brisbane (metropolitan) and Northern NSW (regional): the Brisbane primary channels are Seven's BTQ, Nine's QTQ and 10's TVQ, while the regional affiliates are Seven's NEN, Nine's NBN and 10's NRN.

Both sets of commercial stations are available throughout the Gold Coast, as well as the ABC and SBS television services. Other channels include 10 Drama, 10 Comedy, Nickelodeon, News24 Regional (regional only), ABC Family/ABC Kids, ABC Entertains, ABC News, SBS World Movies, SBS Viceland, SBS Food, NITV, SBS WorldWatch, 7two, 7mate, 7Bravo, 7flix, 9Gem, 9Go!, 9Rush & 9Life. Subscription television service Foxtel is also available.

Of the main metropolitan and regional commercial networks:

- Nine News produces a half-hour local bulletin at 5:30 pm on weeknights, broadcasting from studios in Surfers Paradise. The bulletin airs as an opt-out on the metropolitan station (QTQ9) ahead of the main 6 pm news from Brisbane.
- Seven News produced a local half-hour bulletin at 5:30 pm on weeknights from studios in Surfers Paradise until 21 November 2024. The network retains a newsroom to cover the Gold Coast for its state and national bulletins.
- WIN Television airs NBN News, a half-hour-long regional news program – including local opt-outs for the Gold Coast and Northern Rivers – every weeknight at 5:30 pm. It broadcasts from studios in Newcastle with reporters based in Lismore and Surfers Paradise.
- Network 10 airs short local news updates for the Gold Coast/Lismore district throughout the day from the WIN Television studios in Wollongong.

=== Radio ===
There are numerous commercial, ABC, narrowcast and community stations broadcasting along the Gold Coast.

The Gold Coast's FM commercial stations are Triple M Network's 92.5 Triple M, Hit Network's 90.9 Sea FM, Hot Tomato, Rebel 99.4 FM, The Breeze 100.6 and Radio 97. Community/volunteer stations are 94.1FM, Juice107.3, Radio Metro and 4CRB.

ABC Gold Coast is the local ABC station on the Gold Coast, which is complemented by the ABC's national radio services including Triple J, ABC Radio National, ABC NewsRadio and ABC Classic.

A number of narrowcast services are also available on the Gold Coast, including Big Country Radio, SEN Track 1620, Raw FM and Vision Radio.

The Gold Coast can also receive some Brisbane and Northern NSW FM and AM stations.

== Education ==
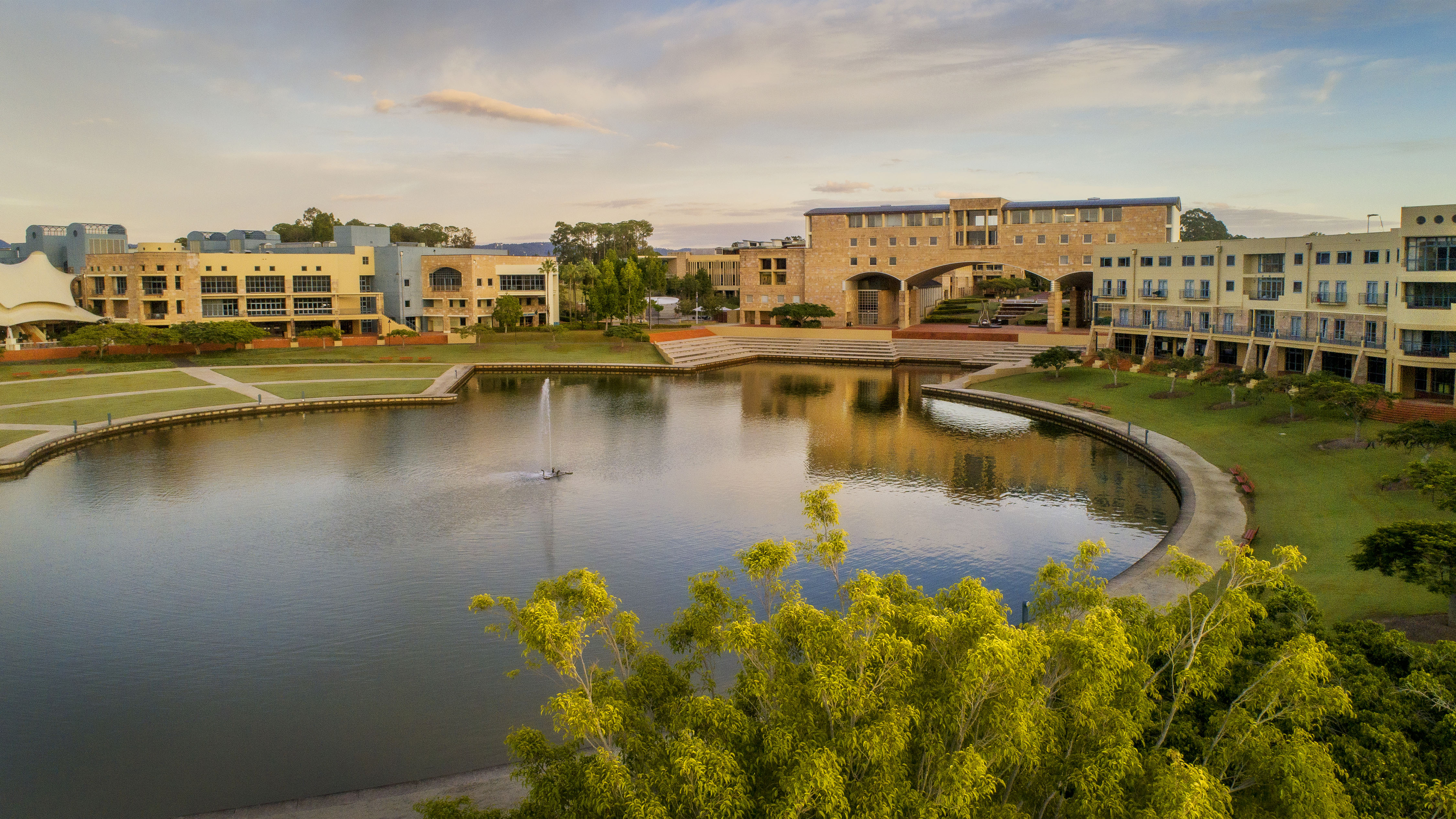
Bond University in Varsity Lakes

=== Colleges and universities ===
The Gold Coast is home to two major university campuses: Bond University at Robina and Griffith University at Southport. Southern Cross University also operates a smaller campus in Bilinga near the Gold Coast Airport. TAFE Queensland also has five campuses at Southport, Robina, Ashmore, Coomera and Coolangatta.

=== Schools and libraries ===
There are over 100 primary and secondary schools, both public and private and of a variety of denominations, including the selective state high school Queensland Academy for Health Sciences and single-sex private schools The Southport School and St Hilda's School. The longest established public school on the Gold Coast is Southport State High School, having originally opened in 1916. There are a number of libraries located on the Gold Coast. For a full list see Gold Coast libraries.

== Health ==
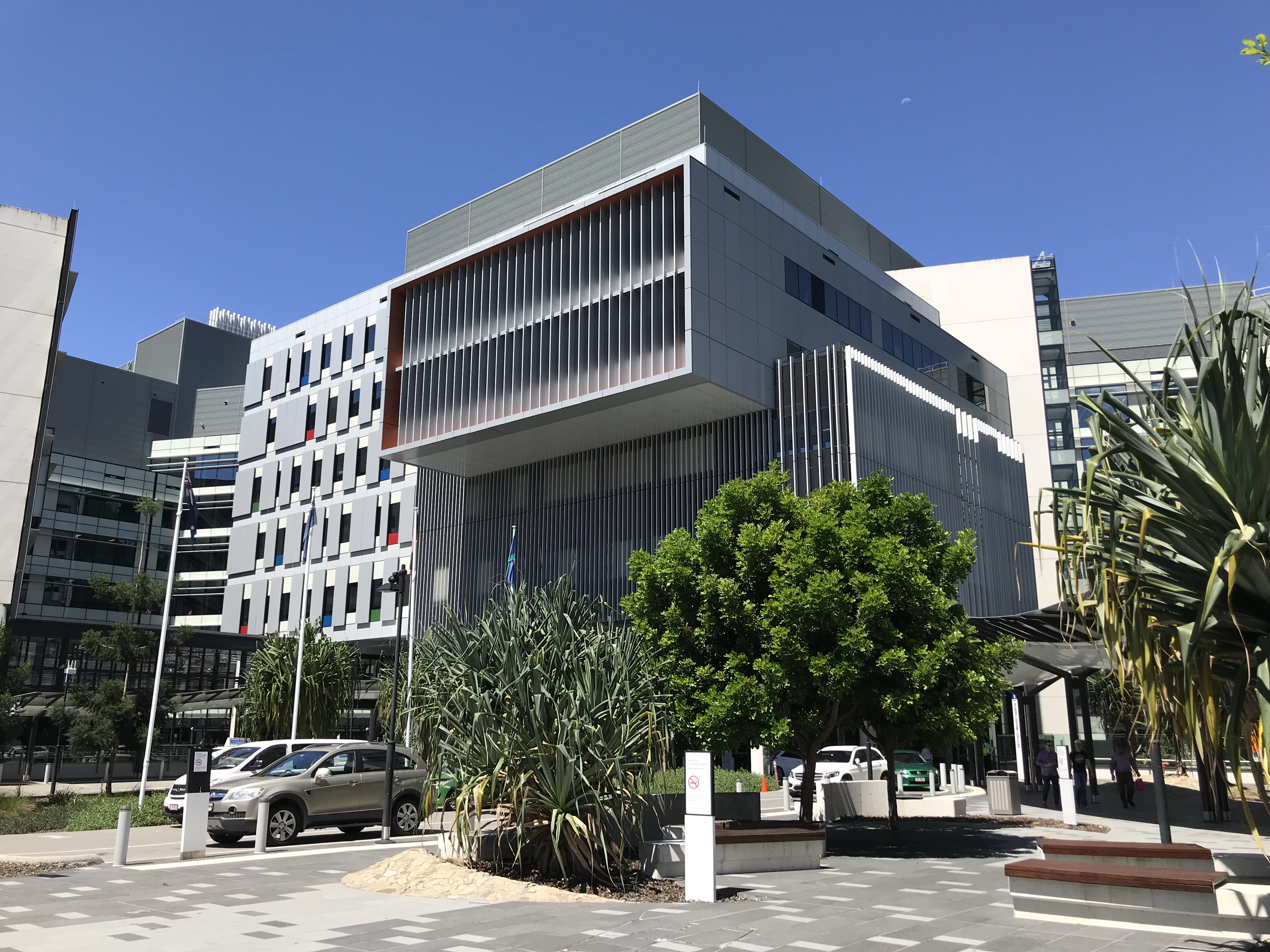
Gold Coast University Hospital

Public health services on the Gold Coast are provided by Queensland Health's Gold Coast Health and Hospital Service (HHS).

There are two major public hospitals in the city: Gold Coast University Hospital in Southport, and Robina Hospital; a third public hospital, Coomera Hospital, will open in 2031. Several smaller public hospitals and private hospitals are located across the city. Two urgent care clinics are also located in Oxenford and Southport.

Griffith University and Bond University run two medical schools on the Gold Coast.

In 2018, 61.6% of the city's population was overweight or obese.

== Infrastructure ==
=== Utilities ===
Electricity

Electricity for the Gold Coast is sourced from Powerlink Queensland at bulk supply substations, which is provided via the National Electricity Market from an interconnected multi-State power system. The Government-owned electricity corporation Energex distributes and retails electricity, natural gas, liquefied petroleum gas (LPG) and value-added products and services to residential, industrial and commercial customers in South-East Queensland.

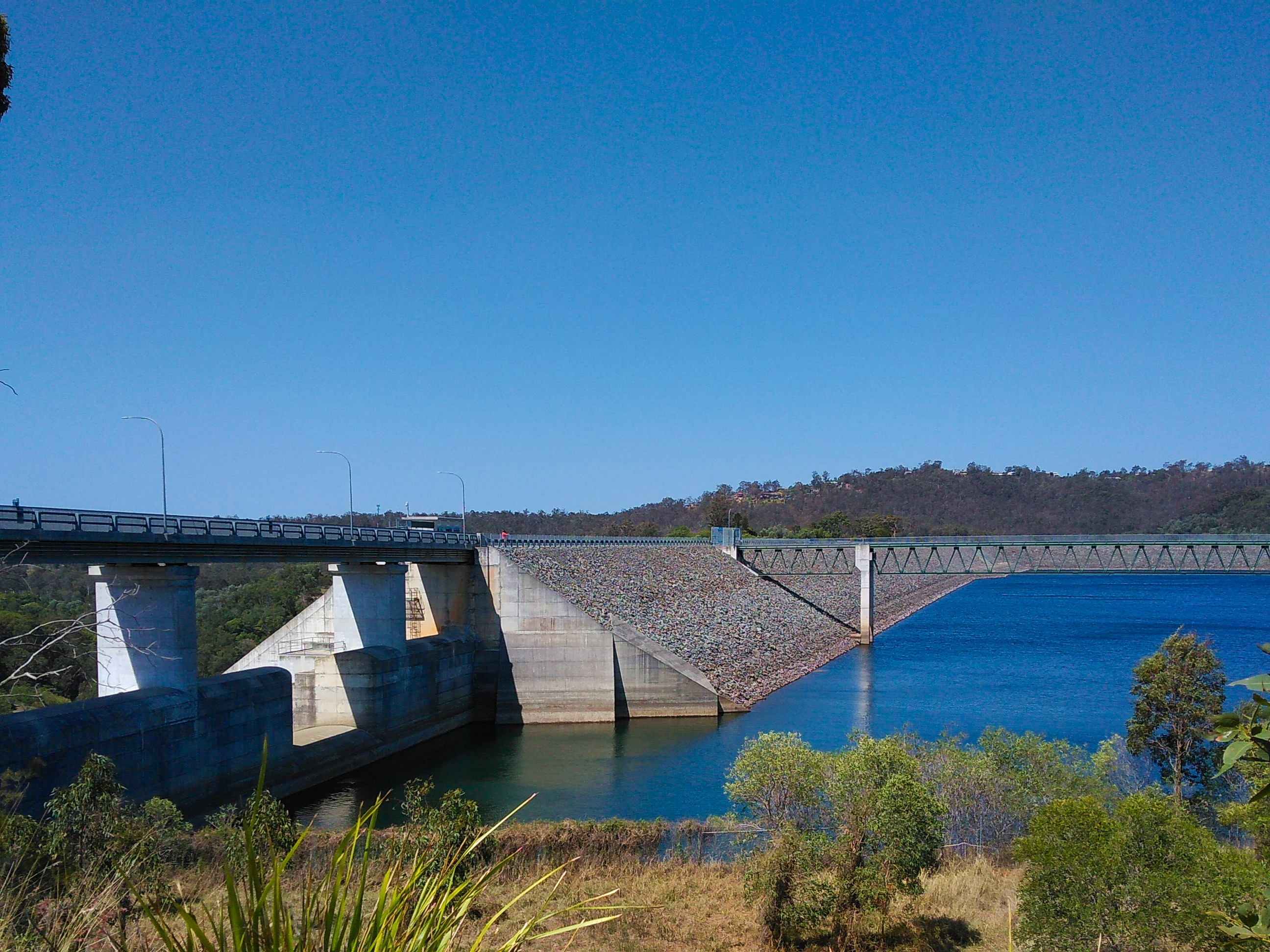
Hinze Dam

Water supply

The Hinze Dam 15 km (9.3 mi) southwest of Nerang is the population's main water supply. The Little Nerang Dam, which feeds into Hinze Dam, can supplement part of the city area's water needs, and both are managed by the city council directorate Gold Coast Water. Reforms of the way in which the water industry is structured have been announced by the State Government, with transfer of ownership and management of water services from local government to the state occurring in 2008–09. City of Gold Coast also sources water from Wivenhoe Dam, west of Brisbane, for northern suburbs when the Hinze Dam, at one-tenth of Wivenhoe's capacity, becomes low.

Water shortage and water restrictions have been current local issues, and a few new Gold Coast residential areas have recently included dual reticulation in their planning and development to supply water from a new water recycling plant being built concurrently. This will make available highly treated recycled water for use around the home in addition to potable water. The Gold Coast has received world recognition for this scheme in its Pimpama-Coomera suburbs.

Gold Coast Water has the capacity to supply up to 133 megalitres of desalinated water per day.

== Transport ==
The car is the dominant mode of transport in the Gold Coast, with over 70% of people using it as their sole mode of travelling to work. The Gold Coast has an extensive network of arterial roads that link coastal suburbs with inland suburbs. In recent years, local and state governments have invested money in transport infrastructure on the Gold Coast to combat the increasing congestion on many of the city's roads. The Gold Coast has an extensive public transport network that includes buses, heavy rail and light rail for commuting to work, visiting attractions, and travelling to other destinations.

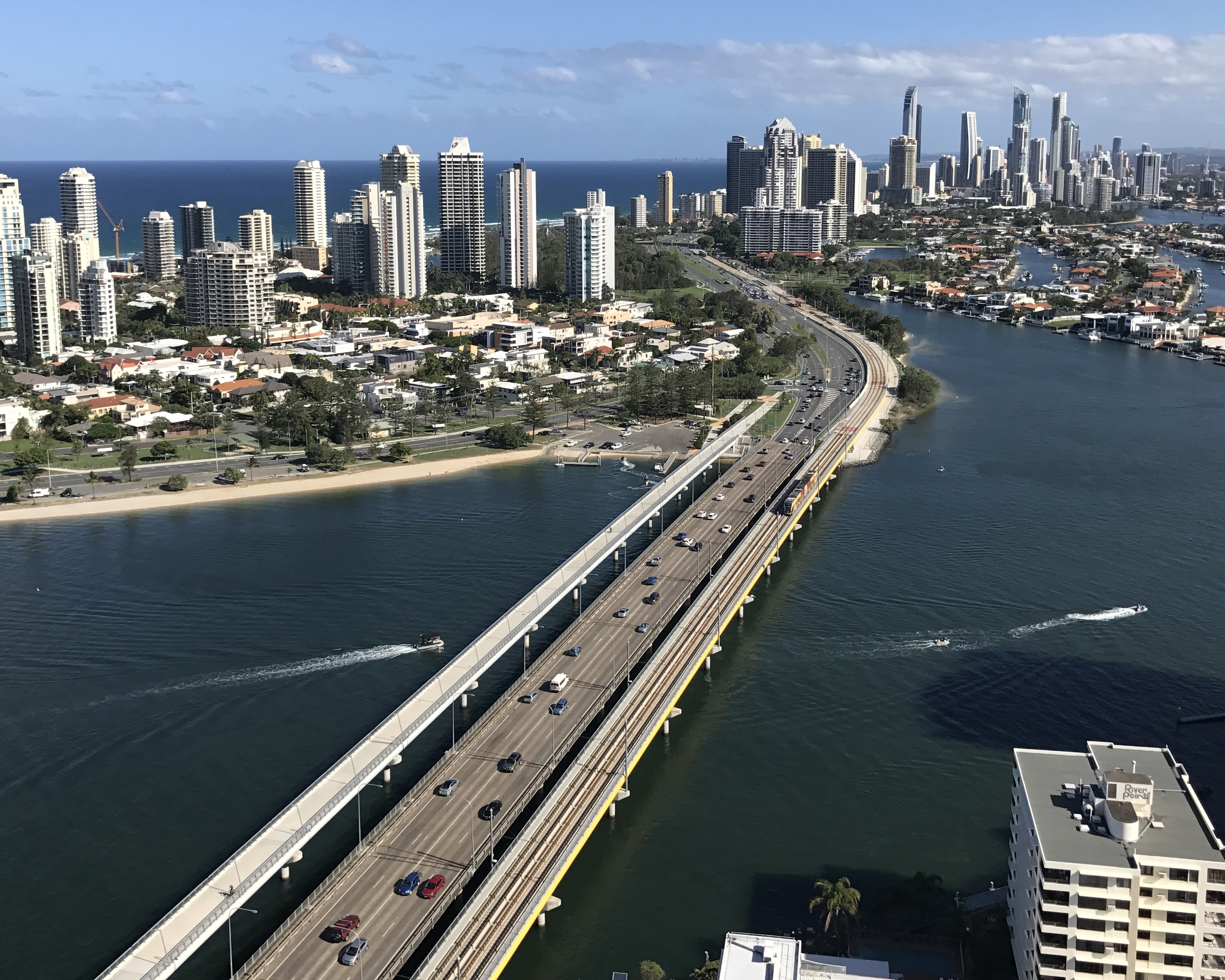
The Gold Coast Highway and G:link crossing the Nerang River

=== Road ===
A number of major roads connect the Gold Coast with Brisbane, New South Wales, and the surrounding areas. The Pacific Motorway (M1) is the main motorway in the area. Beginning at the Logan Motorway (M6) in Brisbane, it travels through the inland Gold Coast region and links with the Pacific Highway at the New South Wales/Queensland border near Tweed Heads. The Pacific Motorway is part of the Brisbane to Sydney corridor. Before the Tugun Bypass was completed in 2008, the motorway ended at Tugun. The Gold Coast Highway services the coastal suburbs of the Gold Coast, including Surfers Paradise, Southport, and Burleigh Heads. Starting at the Pacific Motorway at Tweed Heads, it runs parallel to the coast until it reaches Labrador, where it turns inland to meet the Pacific Motorway again at Helensvale. Other arterial roads include the Smith Street Motorway, which connects Southport, Gold Coast's CBD, with the M1 in Parkwood. Other major roads include Reedy Creek Road, Nerang–Broadbeach Road, Robina Parkway and Southport–Burleigh Road.

=== Light rail ===
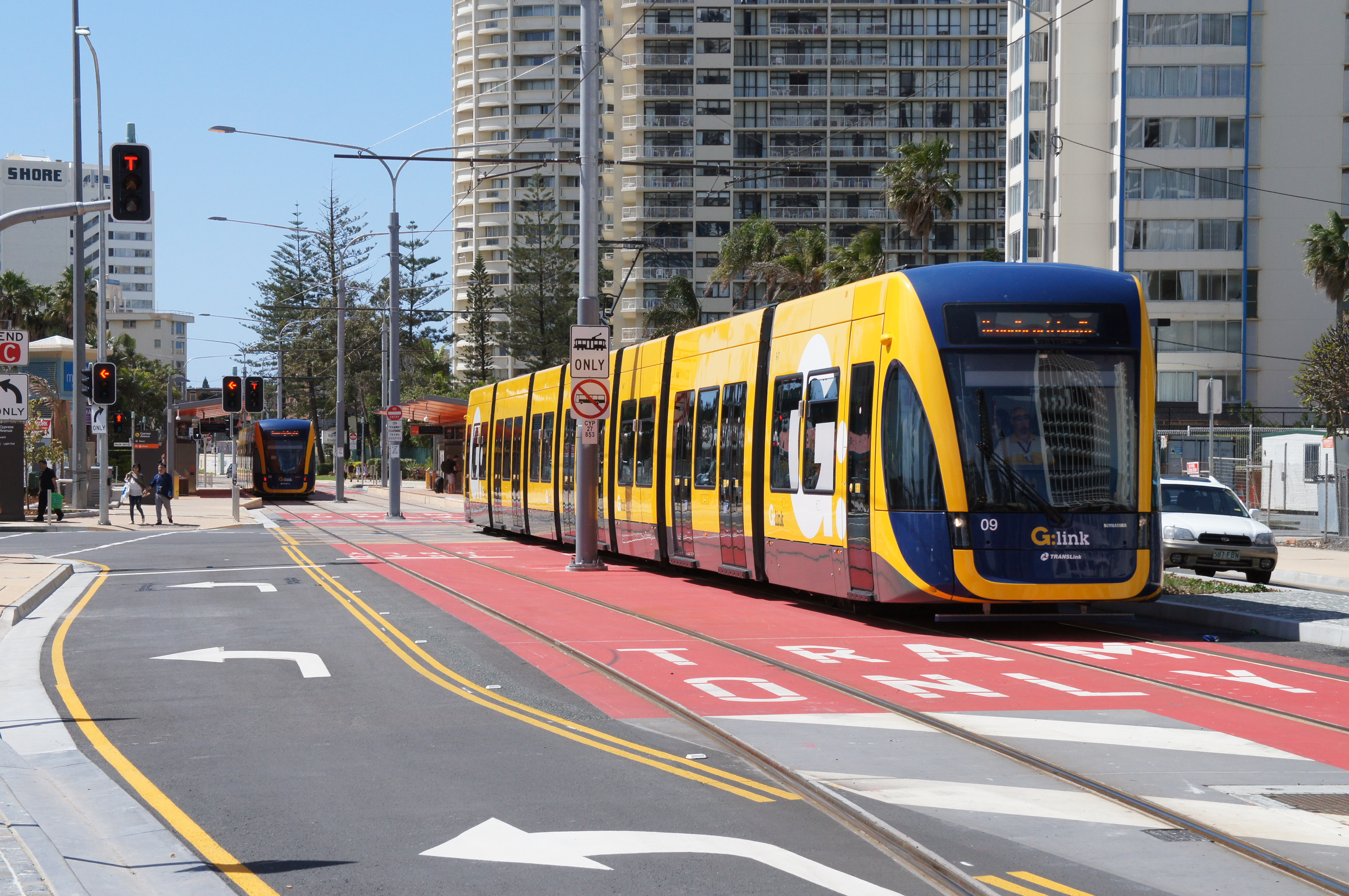
G:link trams on Cypress Avenue

The Gold Coast's light rail service is called G:link, a 20 km (12 mi) line between Helensvale and Broadbeach that also connects the key activity centres of Southport and Surfers Paradise. The G: link was opened in 2014 between Broadbeach and Southport, with an extension to Helensvale completed in 2017 in preparation for the 2018 Commonwealth Games.

=== Heavy rail ===
Queensland Rail operates an inter-city rail service from Brisbane to the Gold Coast along the Gold Coast railway line. The line follows the same route as Brisbane's Beenleigh railway line, continuing after reaching Beenleigh. It then follows a route similar to that of the Pacific Motorway, passing stations at Ormeau, Coomera, Helensvale, Nerang and Robina before terminating at Varsity Lakes. An extension of the Gold Coast line to the Gold Coast Airport is proposed.

=== Bus ===
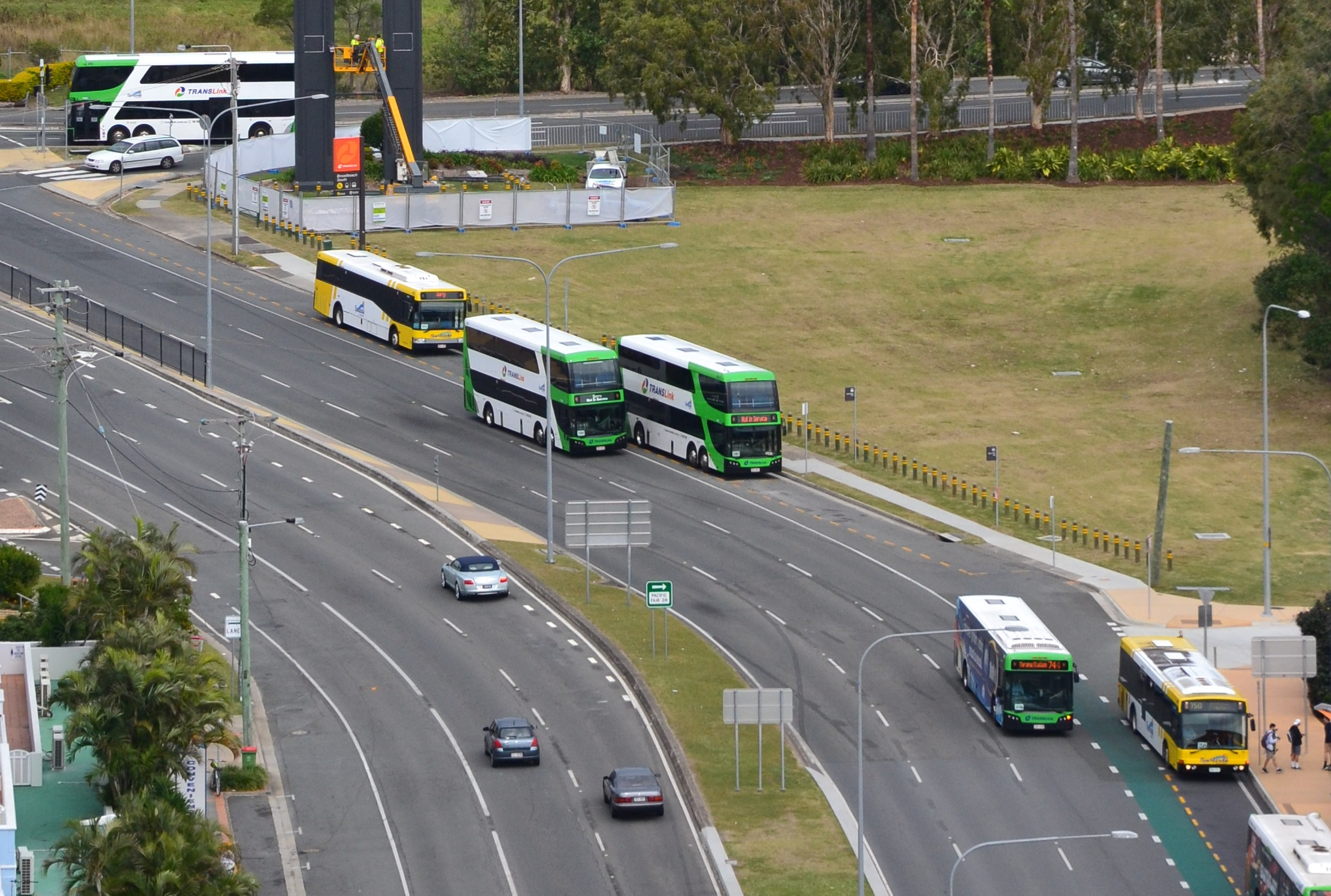
Kinetic Gold Coast buses operating in Broadbeach

Kinetic Gold Coast operates all public passenger services in the city under contract by Translink which coordinates the public transport network in South East Queensland. Services are frequent during the day, with intervals as short as 5 minutes. Kinetic operates a fleet of over 400 buses on over 70 lines covering the entire city.

=== Airports ===
The main international airport, Gold Coast Airport, is located in Coolangatta, approximately 22 kilometres (14 mi) south of Surfers Paradise. Services are provided to interstate capitals and major cities as well as to New Zealand and Indonesia. In 2019, it was the sixth busiest airport in Australia.

Smaller private airfields are located in the northern suburbs of Coombabah (Southport Airport) and Norwell (Heck Field), catering to flight training, recreational and general aviation users.

=== Projects ===
- Stage 3 of the G:link Light Rail system to Burleigh Heads is under construction with it set to be open in 2025 and planning for Stage 4 is underway with that stage to open before the Brisbane 2032 Olympic Games.
- The existing heavy rail Gold Coast line will be extended to Coolangatta
- Pacific Motorway M1 upgrades program.

== Real estate ==
The Gold Coast's real estate market is one of the most dynamic in Australia, characterised by a combination of coastal luxury properties, residential developments, and investment opportunities. According to data from SQM Research, the region has experienced significant property value growth in recent years, with both the median house and unit prices showing strong upward trends. The market's appeal is driven by its lifestyle offerings, proximity to major cities like Brisbane, and ongoing infrastructure improvements.

== Notable people ==
- Megan Anderson, MMA fighter
- Mackenzie Arnold, football goalkeeper for the Australia national team
- Jack Beeton, racing driver
- Anna Bligh, politician
- Harley Cameron, professional wrestler
- Aisha Dee, actress and singer
- Jack Doohan, racing driver and son of Mick Doohan
- Mick Doohan, five-time 500 cc Grand Prix motorcycle racing world champion
- Mick Fanning, surfer
- Broc Feeney, racing driver
- Peter Foster, conman
- Zane Goddard, racing driver
- Lochie Hughes, racing driver
- Alec MacKelden, British Army officer and Australian businessman
- Luke Mitchell, actor and model
- Lyndon Dykes, soccer player
- Lucy Markovic, (1998–2025), fashion model
- Sophie Monk, television personality, actress and singer
- Nash Morris, racing driver
- Joel Parkinson, surfer
- Margot Robbie, actress
- Aiysha Saagar, pop singer
- Amy Shark, singer-songwriter and producer
- Cody Simpson, swimmer and singer
- Jack Smith, racing driver
- Toni Storm, professional wrestler
- Anna Torv, actress
- Jessica Watson, sailor

== See also ==
- Gold Coast hinterland
- List of tallest buildings on the Gold Coast
