= Coomera Connector =

Partially completed motorway on the Gold Coast, Australia

Coomera Connector (M9) Queensland

General information
- Type: Motorway
- Length: 45 km (28 mi)
- Opened: 2 December 2025 (Stage 1 North)
- Route number(s): M9

Major junctions
Stage 1 Nerang – Coomera (16 km)
- South end: Nerang–Broadbeach Road; Nerang, Queensland
- Southport–Nerang Road; Smith Street Motorway; Gold Coast Highway
- North end: Shipper Drive; Coomera, Queensland
Future Coomera – Loganholme (29 km)
- South end: Shipper Drive; Coomera, Queensland
- North end: Pacific Motorway; Logan Motorway; Loganholme, Queensland

Location(s)
- Major suburbs / towns: Stage 1: Molendinar, Gaven, Helensvale; Future: Norwell, Stapylton

Highway system
- Highways in Australia; National Highway • Freeways in Australia; Highways in Queensland

The Coomera Connector (M9) (known as the Intra Regional Transport Corridor during planning) is a partially-completed 45-kilometre (28 mi) motorway that will connect Logan City with the Gold Coast in South East Queensland, Australia. It runs parallel to the Pacific Motorway for its entire length and adjacent to the Gold Coast railway line south of Coomera.

Construction on the 16-kilometre (9.9 mi) stage 1 section between Nerang and Coomera commenced in March 2023. The northern section of stage 1 was the first to open on 2 December 2025, while the other sections of stage 1 will open in following years. The other stages of the motorway north of Coomera are currently under planning as of September 2021. As of July 2022 the business case for future stages is due for completion by the end of 2023.

The route designation M9 and the confirmation of Coomera Connector as the official name was announced in August 2025.

== Design ==
The Coomera Connector is broken up into northern (between Loganholme and Coomera) and southern (between Coomera and Nerang) sections. The southern section, known as Stage 1, is 16 km (9.9 mi) long and is further broken up into three sub-sections, to be delivered separately:

- Stage 1 North: between Shipper Drive at Coomera and Helensvale Road at Helensvale (Opened on 2 December 2025)
- Stage 1 Central: between Helensvale Road and Smith Street Motorway at Molendinar
- Stage 1 South: between Smith Street Motorway and Nerang-Broadbeach Road at Nerang

The motorway is wide enough for six lanes. However, fewer lanes may be built in some sections in the medium-term, depending on transport demand modelling and available construction funding.

Hope Island railway station on the Gold Coast railway line, which is adjacent to the Coomera Connector, will also be constructed in conjunction with Stage 1.

== History ==
=== Planning ===
Since the 1990s, the Coomera Connector corridor has been identified in various public planning documents and Gold Coast planning schemes. A joint 2015 study between the Department of Transport and Main Roads (TMR) and City of Gold Coast confirmed the corridor as a future strategic transport link that will relieve traffic congestion on the Pacific Motorway. The Coomera Connector was also formally declared a future state-controlled road.

The Stage 1 corridor was gazetted in 2016, while the rest of the corridor (northern section) was gazetted between 2017 and 2019.

The preferred route of the northern section was confirmed in April 2021. Residents along the alignment of the northern section had expressed concerns that there was uncertainty of the timeline on when their properties would be acquired and demolished. Eagleby residents were also concerned with the impact of the northern section on the Eagleby Wetlands, a flood plain home to birds and reptiles.

Initial community consultation on the Coomera Connector was undertaken in late 2019, with subsequent community consultation of Stage 1 undertaken between 2020 and 2021.

=== Construction ===
Early works construction with site investigations were undertaken for Stage 1 in 2021. In January 2023, a Fulton Hogan led consortium was awarded an early works contract. In September 2024, the same consortium was awarded the main contract.

=== Funding ===
The federal and state governments have committed a total of $1.53 billion on a 50:50 basis to plan and construct Stage 1 of the Coomera Connector. In September 2021, it was reported by media that Stage 1 had a cost blowout of 40% or $632 million, and the total cost of Stage 1 is $2.1 billion. The Transport and Main Roads Minister Mark Bailey defended the rising cost to have been caused by an infrastructure boom.

The state government has also committed $11 million to continue planning for future stages of the Coomera Connector.

== Exits and Interchanges ==
| LGA | Location | km | mi | Exit (Note: Exits are numbered progressively from the future Pacific-Logan Motorway interchange.) | Destinations | Notes |
|---|---|---|---|---|---|---|
| Gold Coast | Nerang | 0 | 0.0 | | Nerang–Broadbeach Road (State Route 90) | At-grade intersection; future southern end of Coomera Connector |
| Nerang River | | 1 | 0.62 | Bridge over the river (Bridge name unknown) | | |
| Gold Coast | Nerang | 2 | 1.2 | 43 | Southport–Nerang Road (State Route 20) | Southbound exit and northbound entrance |
| Gold Coast | Gaven | 4 | 2.5 | 41 | Smith Street Motorway (State Route 10) | Southbound exit and northbound entrance |
| Gold Coast | Helensvale | 9 | 5.6 | 36 | Gold Coast Highway (State Route 2) | |
| Gold Coast | Helensvale | 12 | 7.5 | 33 | Helensvale Road – Helensvale, Hope Island | Diamond interchange; current southern end of Coomera Connector |
| Coomera River | | 14 | 8.7 | Bridge over the river (Bridge name unknown) | | |
| Gold Coast | Coomera | 16 | 9.9 | 30 | Shipper Drive | Northbound exit and southbound entrance; current northern end of Coomera Connector |
| Gold Coast | Coomera | 19 | 12 | 27 | Foxwell Road | |
| Gold Coast | Pimpama | 21 | 13 | 25 | Yawalpah Road | |
1.000 mi = 1.609 km; 1.000 km = 0.621 mi: Incomplete access; Unopened
