= Pacific Motorway (Brisbane–Brunswick Heads) =

Motorway in New South Wales and Queensland

Pacific Motorway Queensland–New South Wales
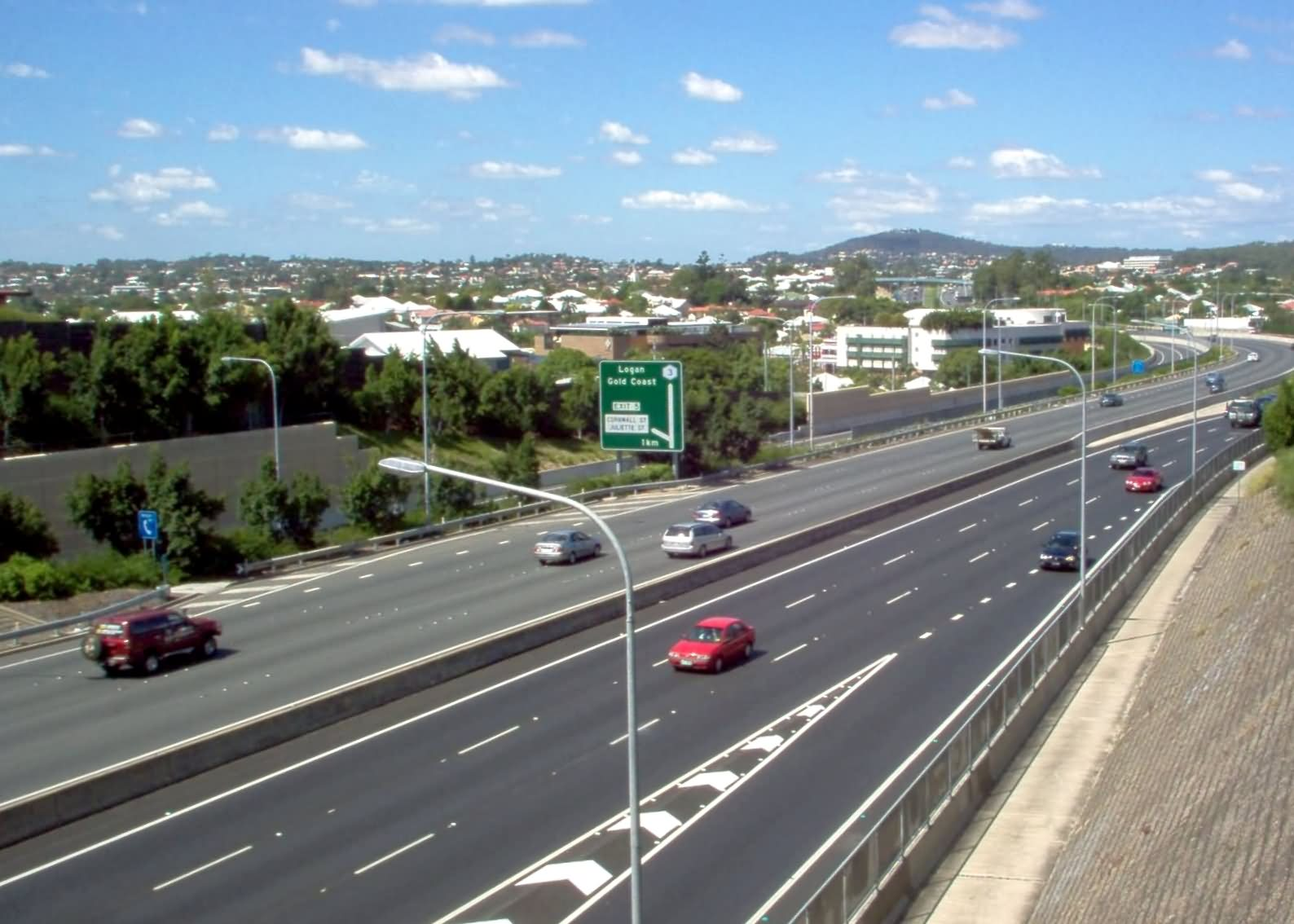

General information
- Type: Motorway
- Length: 158 km (98 mi)
- Route number(s): M3; Brisbane CBD – Eight Mile Plains; M1; Eight Mile Plains – NSW/Qld Border; M1; NSW/Qld Border – Brunswick Heads
- Former route number: Queensland: Metroad 3; National Route 1; Alternate National Route 1; New South Wales: National Route 1 (1955–2013)

Major junctions
- North end: Inner City Bypass
- Gateway Motorway; Logan Motorway; Gold Coast Highway for full list see exits.
- South end: Pacific Highway; Brunswick Heads

Location(s)
- Major suburbs / towns: Queensland: Springwood, Loganholme, Beenleigh, Helensvale, Nerang, Mudgeeraba, Tugun; New South Wales: Tweed Heads South, Banora Point, Chinderah, Mooball, Yelgun, Brunswick Heads

Highway system
- Highways in Australia; National Highway • Freeways in Australia; Highways in Queensland; Highways in New South Wales

The Pacific Motorway is a motorway in Australia between Brisbane, Queensland, and Brunswick Heads, New South Wales, through the New South Wales–Queensland border at Tweed Heads.

The motorway starts at Coronation Drive at Milton in Brisbane, The Brisbane city section of the motorway is often referred to by its former name, the Riverside Expressway. The motorway is about 150 kilometres (93 mi) long, and features eight traffic lanes with a 110 km/h (68 mph) speed limit between the M6 Logan Motorway at Loganholme and State Route 10 Smith Street Motorway at Gaven and generally six or four lanes at 100 km/h (62 mph) on other sections.

The motorway then passes through the major tourist region of the Gold Coast, the destination for most of the vehicular traffic from Brisbane. It passes attractions such as Warner Bros. Movie World, Wet'n'Wild Water World at Oxenford, and Dreamworld theme parks in Coomera. Within Queensland, more than a $2 billion was spent on the motorway between 1990 and 1998, including widening the road and safety measures.

The motorway then crosses the Queensland/New South Wales border via a section known as the Tugun Bypass, which passes under the runway of Gold Coast Airport. Since 2013, a portion of Pacific Highway south of the border was also designated M1 Pacific Motorway.

The highest point of the motorway is 92 metres (302 ft) AHD on a cutting 130 km (81 mi) south of Brisbane (between Cudgera Creek Rd and Sleepy Hollow Rest Area).

== History ==
=== Queensland section ===
The Pacific Highway between Brisbane and the New South Wales border was originally called the Main South Coast Road. It was one of the first roads to be declared by the Main Roads Board, which was created in 1920. The Albert River at Beenleigh and the Nerang River at Southport were the first major watercourses to be bridged. Both of these bridges opened in 1925. In 1928, a major realignment between Helensvale and Southport, including a timber bridge over the South Coast railway line and a concrete bridge over Coombabah Creek at Arundel, was completed. This road is now the northern section of the Gold Coast Highway, between Helensvale and Loders Creek in Labrador.

In June 1930, the Coomera River bridge opened, and in December of that year, the Pacific Highway was declared. By then, some sections were already sealed. The final bridge over a major watercourse, the Logan River bridge, opened in July 1931. The Coomera River bridge still carries a service road between Coomera and Helensvale, and the Logan River bridge between Loganholme and Eagleby carried highway traffic until 1986. It is now a pedestrian bridge.

The sealing of the highway was completed in late 1937, when the bridge over the Pimpama River at Ormeau was completed. Below is a list of the bridges over the smaller watercourses, and when they were completed:

- Bulimba Creek (Eight Mile Plains) – mid 1929
- Sandy Creek (Stapylton) – early 1935
- Halfway Creek (Stapylton) – mid 1939
- Pimpama River (Ormeau) – late 1937
- Hotham Creek (Pimpama) – late 1929
- Oaky Creek (Coomera) – mid 1935
- Saltwater Creek (Helensvale) – early 1931
- Coombabah Creek (Arundel) – early 1928

Of these, the bridges over Bulimba Creek, Sandy Creek, Halfway Creek, Pimpama River and Saltwater Creek replaced older bridges. The bridge over Coombabah Creek at Arundel was built as part of the realignment between Helensvale and Southport. It is unclear if there were older bridges over Hotham and Oaky Creeks; the bridges may have replaced fords, but it is also possible that there are simply no known records for the older bridges, if they existed.

In the 1950s, traffic congestion began to become a serious problem on the highway, a problem that has plagued it ever since. To reduce this, the highway from its northern terminus to Helensvale was duplicated gradually, until the final section between Coomera and Oxenford was completed in 1971.

In 1965, Wilbur Smith's freeway plan was produced, calling for the construction of eight freeways and four expressways connecting Brisbane to the outer suburbs. The highway from its northern terminus to Springwood was to be supplemented by the South East Freeway, which was designated as the F3. The first section of the freeway was opened in March 1973. It ran from the CBD south to Greenslopes. Over the next decade, the freeway was extended southwards, and the Pacific Highway at Springwood was reached in 1985.

On 15 April 1996 it was announced that the Pacific Highway between the Beenleigh-Redland Bay Road interchange at Loganholme, and Pappas Way at Nerang, would be upgraded to motorway standard. From the Albert River at Beenleigh to Coombabah Creek at Gaven, about 28 km (17 mi), the road surface is portland cement concrete. The upgraded road was opened to the public in October 2000. At the same time, the South-East Freeway, and the Pacific Highway between Springwood and Loganholme, was renamed as the Pacific Motorway.

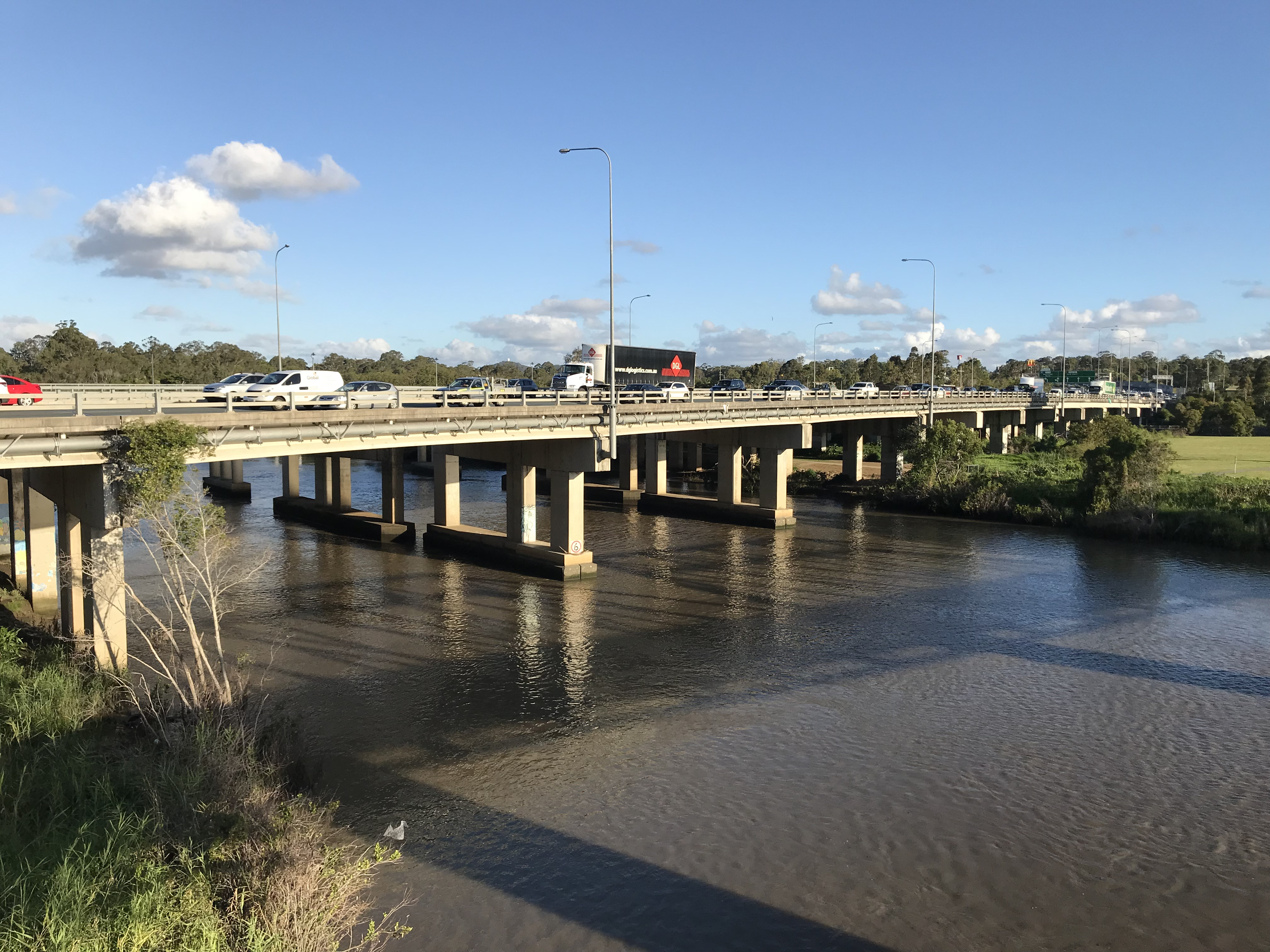
Crossing the Logan River at Loganholme, 2017

Below is an overview of when each construction project on the highway (later motorway) was completed (from earliest to latest).

- 1956–1958 – Stapylton deviation. New 2-lane highway constructed to bypass a rail-over-road bridge with low clearance that was approached by sharp curves on either end.
- 1959–1960 – Gaven Way. New road connecting the Pacific Highway at Helensvale to Nerang, essentially forming the first stage of the Gold Coast bypass route, opened to traffic on 10 December 1960.
- 1961–1962 – Helensvale duplication. New 4-lane highway constructed between just south of the Oxenford turnoff and the Gaven Way turnoff at Helensvale, including two new concrete bridges over Saltwater Creek to replace the existing bridge, and a flyover at Gaven Way.
- 1963–1964 – The highway between Burnside Road at Stapylton & Goldmine Road at Ormeau was duplicated. This project included a second bridge over Halfway Creek, a second culvert at Bridge Creek, and upgrades to the intersections at either end.
- 1965 – Second carriageway between Loganlea Road at Daisy Hill and Bryants Road at Loganholme opened.
- 1966 – Second carriageway between Dennis Road at Springwood and Loganlea Road at Daisy Hill, and to just south of Bryants Road at Loganholme opened.
- 1964–1966 – Beenleigh bypass. First carriageway of the Beenleigh bypass opened to traffic in December 1965, followed by the second carriageway in December 1966. The bypass stretched from just south of the Logan River bridge at Eagleby to just north of Burnside Road, Stapylton.
- 1966 – Pimpama to Coomera upgrade (southern end of future Pimpama bypass to Foxwell Road).
- 1966–1967 – Ormeau duplication. Highway duplicated from Goldmine Road at Ormeau to Mirambeena Drive at Pimpama including a short deviation, and new twin bridges over Pimpama Creek (now called the Pimpama River). The old highway is now called Tillyroen Road.
- 1967 – Second carriageway between Kingston Road at Underwood and Dennis Road at Springwood opened.
- 1967–1968 – Logan River bridge duplication. Second bridge across the Logan River from Loganholme to Eagleby officially opened by Minister for Main Roads Ron Camm on 25 May 1968.
- 1968–1969 – Pimpama duplication. Duplication from Mirambeena Drive to just north of Hotham Creek.
- 1969–1970 – Coomera Deviation. 1.3 miles (2.1 km) long deviation from Days Road to Reserve Road.
- 1970–1971 – Pimpama Bypass. 3.1 miles (5.0 km) long four lane bypass of Pimpama, including a new bridge over Hotham Creek at its northern end.
- 1970–1971 – Coomera River bridge duplication. Second bridge across the Coomera River between Coomera and Oxenford officially opened by Minister for Main Roads Ron Camm on 3 June 1971, completing four lanes between Brisbane and Helensvale.
- 1971–1973 – Alice Street to Juliette Street. First stage of the South-East Freeway between the Brisbane CBD and Greenslopes officially opened to traffic on 7 March 1973.
- 1973–1976 – Nerang to Reedy Creek. Reconstructed and realigned highway along the former rail reserve, started in 1973, completed in December 1976.
- 1977 – Slacks Creek to Daisy Hill deviation. Northbound carriageway realigned onto a straighter alignment paralleling the southbound carriageway. Village Drive intersection at Daisy Hill which provided access to Loganlea Road was also upgraded. Opened in March or April 1977.
- 1976–1977 – Juliette Street to Marshall Road. Second stage of the South-East Freeway opened between Juliette Street at Greenslopes and Marshall Road at Holland Park West on 27 July 1977.
- 1978–1979 – Nerang bypass. 2.5 miles (4.0 km) two-lane bypass of Nerang officially opened by Minister for Main Roads Russ Hinze on 6 April 1979.
- 1979 – Watland Street overpass at Springwood opened on 25 September 1979, the intersections at Dennis Road and Brennan Street were removed at the same time.
- 1980 – Marshall Road to Klumpp Road. Third stage of the South-East Freeway between Marshall Road Holland Park West and Klumpp Road Upper Mount Gravatt officially opened on 21 October 1980.
- 1981 – Loganlea Road Overpass. New interchange built at Loganlea Road to replace the Village Drive intersection at Daisy Hill, which was closed after the overpass opened.
- 1982 – Klumpp Road to Logan Road. Fourth stage of the South-East Freeway opened between Klumpp Road at Upper Mount Gravatt and Logan Road at Eight Mile Plains by Queensland Premier Sir Joh Bjelke-Petersen on 13 August 1982.
- 1983 – Bryants Road interchange. This interchange eliminated a dangerous at-grade intersection. At the same time, all remaining at-grade intersections between Loganlea Road at Daisy Hill and Beenleigh-Redland Bay Road at Loganholme were closed and either replaced with left-in/left-out on/off-ramps or closed altogether.
- 1984 – Oxenford/Helensvale Interchanges. Two new interchanges completed at Hope Island Road/Tamborine-Oxenford Road at Oxenford and at Helensvale Road at Helensvale in October 1984.
- 1981–1985 – Reedy Creek to Tugun Extension. Two-lane bypass of West Burleigh opened to traffic in three stages; West Burleigh to Palm Beach in October 1981, Reedy Creek to West Burleigh in November 1983, and Palm Beach to Tugun in May 1985.
- 1984–1985 – Helensvale to Nerang duplication. Four-lane duplication works completed between Gold Coast Highway and Nerang-Broadbeach Road in June 1985.
- 1985–1986 – Tweed Heads bypass. Two-lane bypass between Bilinga and Tweed Heads West in New South Wales was opened by Minister for Main Roads and Racing Russ Hinze on 18 July 1985 at a total cost of A$3.6m; second carriageway completed in December 1986.
- 1985 – Logan Road to Compton Road. Fifth and final stage of the South-East Freeway from Eight Mile Plains to Springwood was officially opened by Minister for Main Roads and Racing Russ Hinze on 22 November 1985.
- 1986 – Logan River bridge duplication. New concrete bridge across Logan River between Loganholme and Eagleby, duplicating the 1968 bridge, officially opened by Minister for Main Roads and Racing Russ Hinze on 16 July 1986.
- 1987 – Mudgeeraba Interchange. Half-diamond interchange at Mudgeeraba Road opened by Minister for Main Roads and Racing Russ Hinze on 21 August 1987.
- 1987 – Coomera Interchange. Interchange opened by Deputy Premier and Minister for Main Roads Bill Gunn on 10 December 1987. Much like the later interchanges further up north, it had a very short life of only 11 years.
- 1985–1987 – Smith Street Motorway. New motorway connection road opened to connect Southport to the Pacific Highway at Gaven. A new interchange was built with the Pacific Highway at Gaven as part of the project. The opening date was 20 May 1987.
- 1988 – Merrimac Interchange. The dumbbell interchange at Gooding Drive was opened by Deputy Premier and Minister for Main Roads Bill Gunn on 27 July 1988.
- 1989 – Reedy Creek Interchange. Interchange completed in September 1989.
- 1991 – 2 New interchanges opened at Burnside Road Stapylton and Peachy Road Ormeau. Both were replaced in 1999.
- 1991 – Nerang to Mudgeeraba Duplication. Duplication to four lanes between Pappas Way and Mudgeeraba Road and a new interchange at Elysium Road at Worongary opened by Federal Minister for Transport Bob Brown on 23 December 1991.
- 1993 – Mirambeena Drive Interchange. This interchange at Pimpama like the two interchanges north of it was also replaced in 1999.
- 1993 – Rochedale South to Slacks Creek six-lane upgrade between Rochedale Road and Old Chatswood Road.
- 1993–1994 – Mudgeeraba to Reedy Creek duplication. Duplication to four lanes between Mudgeeraba Road and Reedy Creek Road including a new interchange at Robina Parkway/Somerset Drive at Robina opened by Minister for Transport David Hamill on 18 May 1994.
- 1994 – Yawalpah Road Interchange. Diamond interchange at Yawalpah Road at Pimpama opened by MP Paul Braddy on 3 November 1994. In June 2019, plans to redesign the interchange were announced. Construction started on the redesigned interchange in August 2022 and was completed in February 2025.
- 1994–1995 – The highway between Old Chatswood Road at Slacks Creek and Winnetts Road at Daisy Hill was upgraded to six lanes.
- 1996 – Daisy Hill to Loganholme six lane upgrade. Widening from four to six lanes from Winnetts Road in Daisy Hill to a new interchange at Beenleigh-Redland Bay Road in Loganholme, removing the final at-grade intersection north of Nerang. The upgrade was completed in December 1996.
- 1996–1997 – Reedy Creek to Tugun duplication. Duplication to four lanes between Reedy Creek Road and Stewart Road and a southerly extension of State Route 3 to the motorway at Burleigh Heads was opened by Minister for Main Roads Vaughan Johnson on 16 June 1997.
- 1998–2000 – Loganholme to Nerang Upgrade (Pacific Motorway Upgrade). 42 km long eight- and six-lane upgrade between Beenleigh-Redland Bay Road at Loganholme, and Pappas Way at Nerang, including various interchange upgrades and service centres at Stapylton and Coomera, as well as heralding Queensland's first alphanumeric route number, M1, officially commissioned by Premier Peter Beattie and Minister for Main Roads Steve Bredhauer on 6 October 2000 at a completed cost of A$850m.
- 2002 – Fitzgerald Avenue southbound exit off-ramp at Springwood opened.
- 2006–2008 – Tugun Bypass. This stretch of motorway crosses the New South Wales state border at Cobaki Lakes and goes through the Gold Coast Airport on the New South Wales side at Tweed Heads West via a tunnel.
- 2009–2010 – Daisy Hill upgrade. The 1981 interchange at Winnetts Road was rebuilt, and the ramps at Shailer Road and Nujooloo Road were removed to relieve traffic congestion.
- 2011–2012 – Nerang to Worongary/Merrimac Upgrade. six lane widening works between Pappas Way and Gooding Drive completed on 25 May 2012.
- 2014 – Worongary/Merrimac to Mudgeeraba Upgrade. Six lane widening works between Gooding Drive and Robina Town Centre Drive completed on 26 September 2014.
- 2016 – Coomera interchange upgrade. Roundabouts have been replaced by signalised intersections.
- May 2020 – (Stage 1 M1 Upgrade North) Pacific Motorway & Gateway Motorway M1/M3 interchange upgrade at Eight Mile Plains.
- June 2020 – Mudgeeraba to Varsity Lakes Upgrade. Widening to six lanes with smart technologies.
- September 2021 – (Eight Mile Plains to Daisy Hill Upgrade Package 1) Sports Drive to Gateway Motorway Upgrade. Widening to five northbound lanes between Sports Drive at Underwood and the Gateway Motorway interchange at Eight Mile Plains. The upgrade was done on 7 September 2021.
- June 2022 – (Eight Mile Plains to Daisy Hill Upgrade Package 2) Pacific Highway Western Service Road Upgrade. The service road between Moss Street at Springwood and Westerway Street in Slacks Creek was realigned and widened for the new motorway upgrade and to handle the traffic capacity.
- November 2022 – Varsity Lakes to Tugun Upgrade (Varsity Lakes to Burleigh Heads Package A). 2 km of motorway between Varsity Lakes & Burleigh Heads was widened to a minimum of three lanes in both directions including a new diverging diamond interchange at Southport-Burleigh Road Exit 87.
- April 2025 – Varsity Lakes to Tugun Upgrade (Burleigh Heads to Palm Beach Package B). The motorway between Burleigh Heads and Nineteenth Avenue at Palm Beach was widened to a minimum of three lanes in both directions. Partial opening of the Booningba Drive service road from Exit 89 at West Burleigh to Nineteenth Avenue at Palm Beach was opened.
- May 2025 – (Eight Mile Plains to Daisy Hill Upgrade Package 3). The new upgraded section from the Watland Street overpass at Springwood to the start of the new bike way at Sports Drive at Underwood included a new bus way extension to Springwood, which opened on 12 May 2025, along with a new bus station at Rochedale.
- November 2025 – Varsity Lakes to Tugun Upgrade (Palm Beach to Tugun Package C). The motorway between Nineteenth Avenue at Palm Beach and Exit 95 at Tugun was upgraded to a minimum of three lanes in both directions. The second stage of the Booningba Drive service road from Nineteenth Avenue and Exit 92 at Palm Beach was completed.

=== Queensland Upgrade Projects ===
List of projects on the Pacific Motorway (Brisbane–Brunswick Heads) (Queensland section)
| Project | Length (km) | Construction dates | | Value | Status | Description |
| Project | Length (km) | Start | End | Value | Status | Description |
|---|---|---|---|---|---|---|
| Varsity Lakes to Tugun Upgrade. | 10 km | May 2020 | November 2025 | 1.5 billion | Completed | Provide additional lanes and increase capacity |
| Watland Street to Sports Drive. | 3.5 km | November 2020 | May 2025 | $750 million | Completed | Provide additional lanes and increase capacity |
| Eight Mile Plains to Daisy Hill. | 8 km | Mid 2022 | Mid 2025 | $750 million | Completed | Rochedale bus station and park 'n' ride |
| Daisy Hill to Logan Motorway. | 10 km | | | $1 billion | In planning | Provide additional lanes and increase capacity |

=== New South Wales section ===
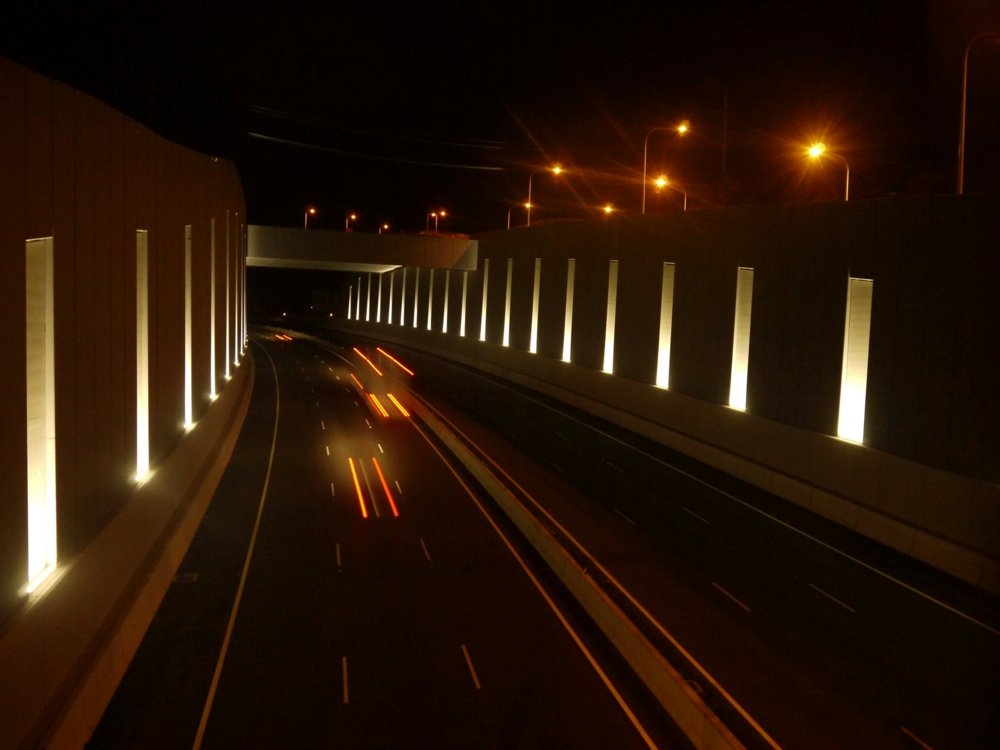
Banora Point Upgrade on the Pacific Motorway (looking south)

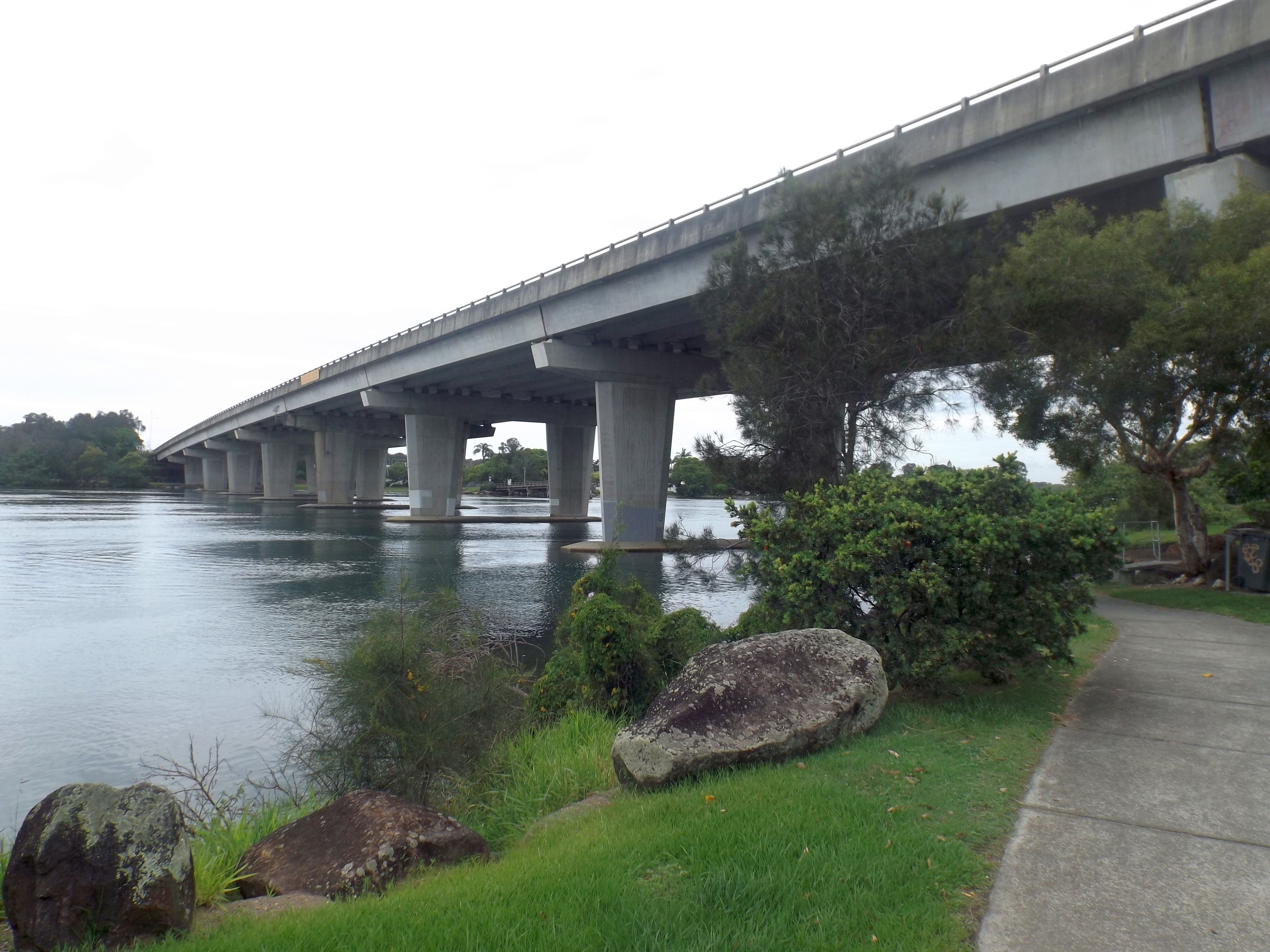
Barneys Point Bridge over the Tweed River, 2017

The NSW section of the Pacific Motorway to Brunswick Heads is part of the Pacific Highway upgrade from Hexham to the Queensland border. It was renamed to Pacific Motorway from Pacific Highway in February 2013.

The motorway's first stage was completed in July 1985 with the opening of the first stage of the Tweed Heads Bypass from Bilinga just north of the Queensland border to Kennedy Drive at Tweed Heads West, followed by the second stage in November 1992 from Kennedy Drive at Tweed Heads West to Minjungbal Drive at Tweed Heads South. Over the next 20 years, sections of the motorway progressively opened to traffic, until the final section, the Banora Point upgrade, opened in September 2012. For more comprehensive information on this section of motorway, see the Pacific Highway article.

Below is an overview of when each stage of the motorway was completed (from south to north):

| Southern terminus | Northern terminus | Distance | | Date completed | Notes |
| Southern terminus | Northern terminus | km | mi | Date completed | Notes |
|---|---|---|---|---|---|
| Tyagarah | Ewingsdale | | | 16 October 1998 | Realignment |
| Tandys Lane bypass | | | | 19 December 2001 | Bypass |
| Yelgun | Brunswick Heads | | | 11 July 2007 | Realignment |
| Chinderah | Yelgun | | | 6 August 2002 | Included the Cudgen Road Tunnel |
| Chinderah bypass | | | | 29 November 1996 | Included the Barneys Point Bridge |
| Banora Point upgrade | | | | 22 September 2012 | |
| Minjungbal Drive (Tweed Heads South) | Kennedy Drive (Tweed Heads West) | | | 14 November 1992 | Tweed Heads bypass |
| Kennedy Drive (Tweed Heads West) | Bilinga | | | 18 July 1985 | Tweed Heads bypass |

== Service centres ==
The Pacific Motorway, when it was upgraded in September 2000, was the first motorway in Queensland to have service centres integrated. There are two service centres, Stapylton servicing southbound traffic, and Coomera servicing northbound traffic. The travel centres include fuel and fast-food restaurants, picnic areas and a shop. Solar panels on the roofs of the centres provide power to the facilities.

== Speed limits ==
| Southern terminus | Northern terminus | Speed limit | | Notes |
| Southern terminus | Northern terminus | km/h | mph | Notes |
|---|---|---|---|---|
| Tyagarah | Chinderah | 110 | 68 | Some variance |
| Chinderah | Gaven | 100 | 62 | Crosses the state border |
| Gaven | Beenleigh | 110 | 68 | |
| Beenleigh | Greenslopes | 100 | 62 | |
| Greenslopes | Vulture Street, Woolloongabba | 90 | 56 | |
| Vulture Street, Woolloongabba | Elizabeth Street (CBD) | 80 | 50 | Concurrency with the Riverside Expressway |
| Elizabeth Street (CBD) | Herschel Street (CBD) | 70 | 43 | Concurrency with the Riverside Expressway |
| Herschel Street (CBD) | Hale Street (CBD) | 60 | 37 | Concurrency with the Riverside Expressway |

=== Speed cameras ===
There is a fixed speed camera on the Pacific Motorway at Holland Park West, facing northbound. There is another at Loganholme just after the Logan Motorway exit facing northbound. A third set of speed cameras, situated on the northbound side of the motorway at the Smith Street Motorway interchange at Gaven, became active around March 2013 but is now currently in the process of being replaced with point to point cameras facing both north and southbound between Gaven (Exit 66), Oxenford (Exit 57), and Beenleigh South (Exit 35).

== Major settlements ==
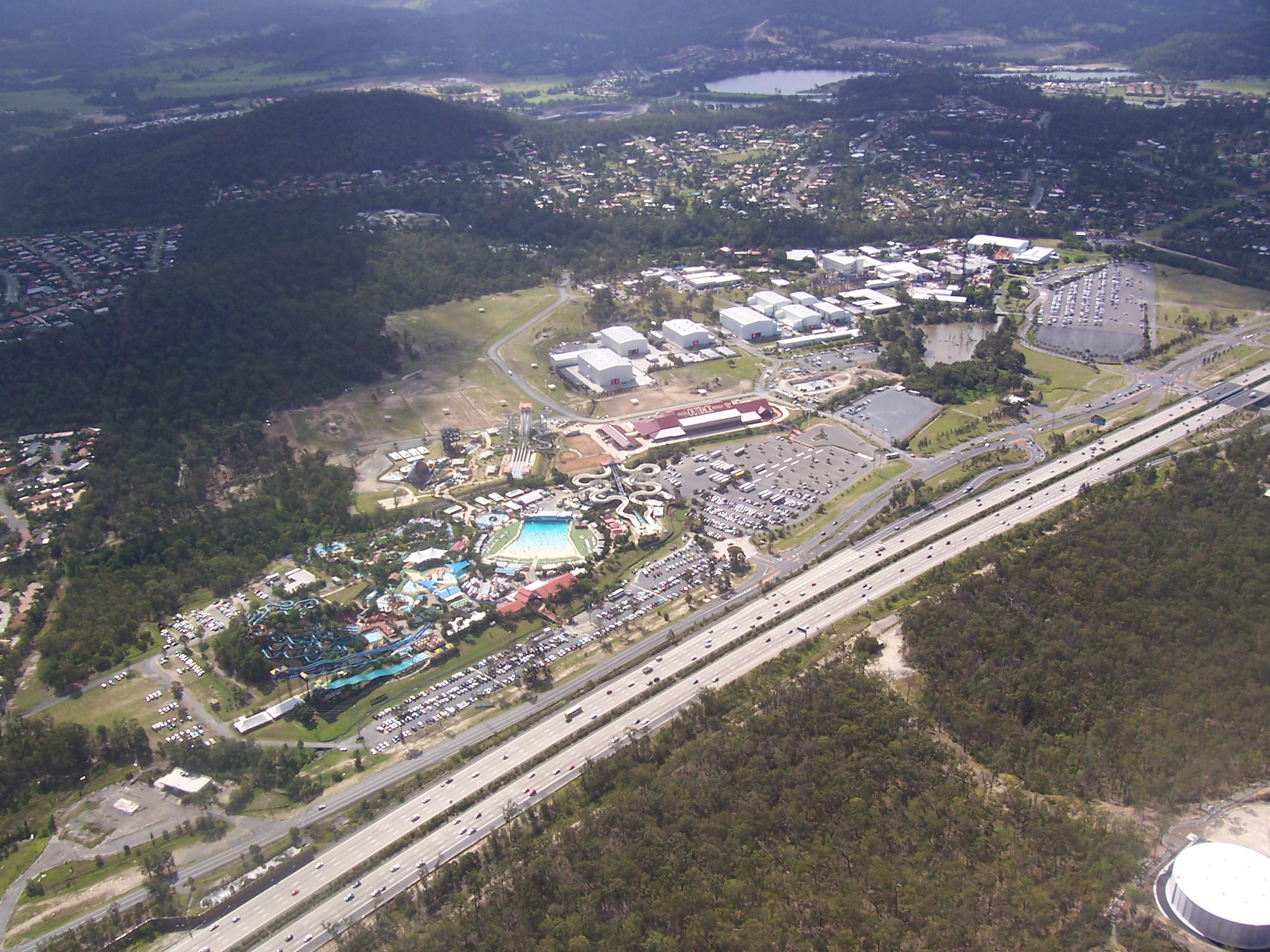
M1 Motorway at the Helensvale North exit looking out towards Oxenford.

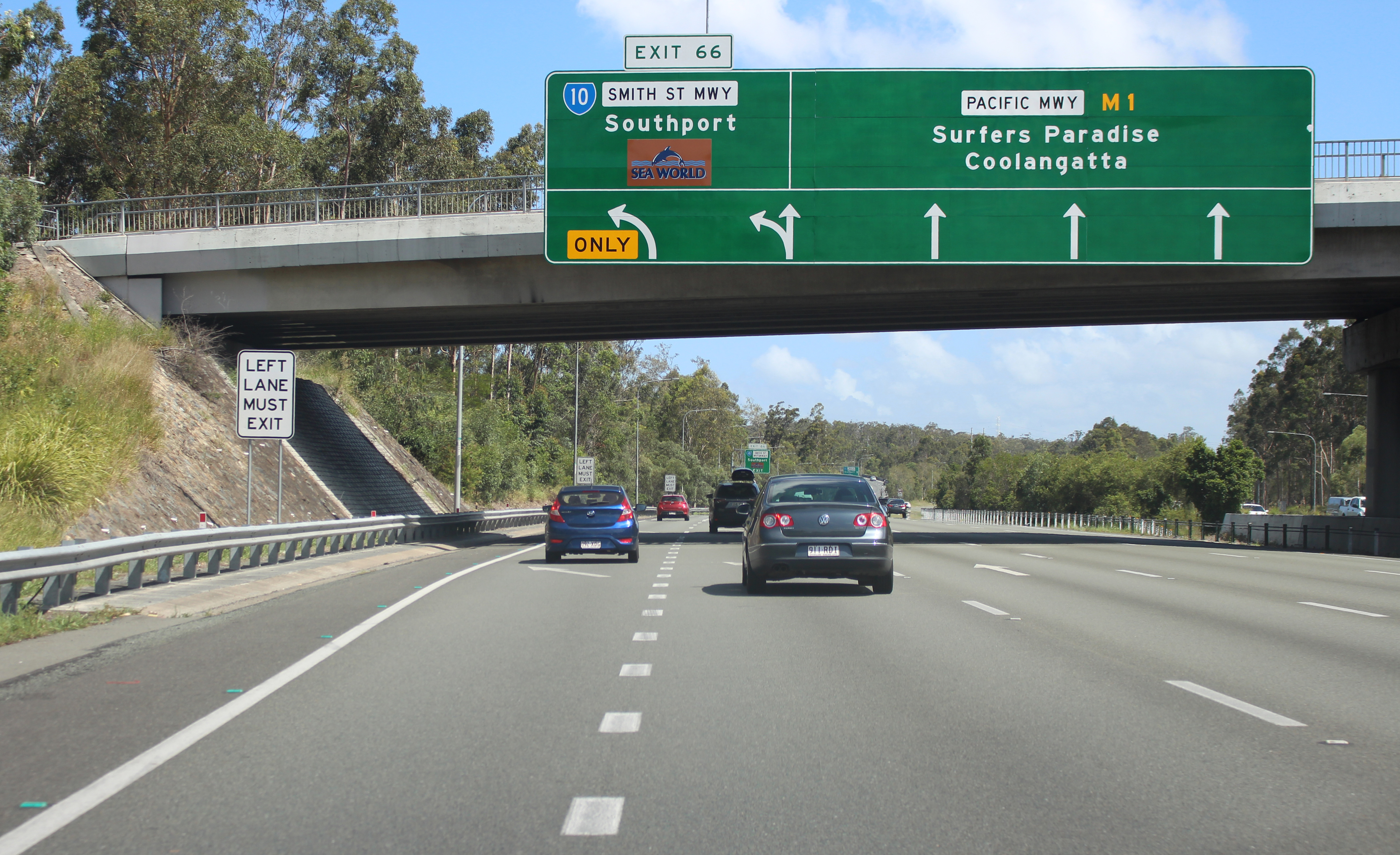
Pacific Motorway southbound at the Smith Street Motorway exit at Gaven.

=== Gold Coast ===
Yatala to Coolangatta is within the City of Gold Coast. The city has a population of 691,000 and is Australia's sixth-largest city. The oceanside parts of the Gold Coast are characterised by high-rises, residential canal developments, a casino, theme parks, amusement parks and numerous tourist attractions, whilst its inland suburbs are leafy and well kept, looking much like the newer suburbia of other large Australian cities. The Gold Coast attracts tourists from around the world and is one of Australia's leading tourist destinations. Most of the Gold Coast has been bypassed by the Pacific Motorway. The former coastal route of the Pacific Highway through the Gold Coast has been renamed as the Gold Coast Highway. The Pacific Highway was very congested between Tugun and Bilinga until the Tugun Bypass opened in June 2008 bypassing the old highway. The old bypassed section of the highway was renamed Gold Coast Highway like the rest of the former bypassed coastal route running along the Gold Coast coastline from Helensvale.

=== Tweed Heads ===
The motorway crosses the Tweed River south of Banora Point. Tweed Heads is the major commercial centre of the northern part of the Northern Rivers region, which extends as far south as Crabbes Creek in New South Wales. It was known as a "twin town" along with Coolangatta, Queensland before they coalesced with other towns to form the suburbia of the Gold Coast. The Tweed River valley contains the Cudgen Road Tunnel at Stotts Creek completed in 2002. The tunnel was built to avoid the visual impact of a road cutting.

== Interchanges ==
=== New South Wales ===
| LGA | Location | km | mi | Destinations (Note: Listing includes: terminals, declared roads, former alignments, and intersections where a turn is required to remain on the highway, and minor roads at these intersections.) | Notes |
|---|---|---|---|---|---|
| Byron | Brunswick Heads | 0 | 0.0 | Gulgan Road [west] – Mullumbimby | Partial Dumbbell interchange |
| Byron | Brunswick Heads | 3.0 | 1.9 | Old Pacific Highway / Gulgan Road – Brunswick Heads | Dumbbell interchange |
| Byron | Brunswick Heads | 6.0 | 3.7 | Old Pacific Highway | Dumbbell interchange |
| Brunswick River | | 6.2 | 3.9 | Matthew Devine Bridge | |
| Byron | Billinudgel | 10.0 | 6.2 | Wilfred Street – Ocean Shores, Billinudgel | Northbound exit and entrance to the west only |
| Byron | Billinudgel | 11.5 | 7.1 | Tweed Valley Way / Brunswick Valley Way (Tourist Route 40) – Yelgun, Burringbar, Murwillumbah | Trumpet interchange, with partial dumbbell |
| Tweed | Cudgera Creek | 24.5 | 15.2 | Cudgera Creek Road – Cudgera Creek, Pottsville, Hastings Point | Diamond interchange |
| Tweed | Clothiers Creek | 31.5 | 19.6 | Clothiers Creek Road – Cabarita Beach, Bogangar, Murwillumbah | |
| Cudgen Road (no access) | | 37.1 | 23.1 | Cudgen Road Tunnel | |
| Tweed | Chinderah | 40.0 | 24.9 | Tweed Valley Way (Tourist Route 40) – Tumbulgum, Condong, Murwillumbah | Trumpet interchange |
| Tweed | Chinderah | 43.0 | 26.7 | Chinderah Road / Tweed Coast Road – Chinderah, Kingscliff | Grade-separated roundabout interchange |
| Tweed | Chinderah | 44.6 | 27.7 | Waugh Street – Chinderah | Northbound exit and entrance to the west only |
| Tweed | Chinderah | 45.3 | 28.1 | Chinderah Bay Drive / Fingal Road – Chinderah, Fingal Head | Southbound exit and entrance only; trumpet interchange |
| Tweed River | | 45.7 | 28.4 | Barneys Point Bridge | |
| Tweed | Banora Point | 46.5 | 28.9 | Sexton Hill Drive – Banora Point, Terranora | Trumpet interchange |
| Tweed | Banora Point | 47.0 | 29.2 | Wilsons Park Tunnel | |
| Tweed | Tweed Heads South | 48.0 | 29.8 | Minjungbal Drive / Sexton Hill Drive – Banora Point, Terranora, Tweed Heads South | Trumpet interchange |
| Tweed | Tweed Heads South | 49.7 | 30.9 | Kirkwood Road – Tweed Heads South | Southbound exit and southbound entrance only |
| Terranora Creek | | 50.6 | 31.4 | Bridge over the creek (bridge name unknown) | |
| Tweed | Tweed Heads West | 51.2 | 31.8 | Kennedy Drive – Tweed Heads, Tweed Heads West, Bilambil Heights | Dogbone interchange |
| Tweed | Tweed Heads West | 52.0 | 32.3 | Gold Coast Highway (Queensland State Route 2) – Coolangatta, Bilinga, Tugun, Gold Coast Airport | Diamond interchange |
| Tweed | Tweed Heads West | 52.9 | 32.9 | Tunnel under airport runway | |
| Tweed | Tweed Heads West | 55.4 | 34.4 | Pacific Motorway (M1) | Northern terminus in New South Wales; road continues in Queensland as the Pacific Motorway (M1) |
| New South Wales – Queensland state border | | | | New South Wales – Queensland state border | |
1.000 mi = 1.609 km; 1.000 km = 0.621 mi: Incomplete access; Route transition

=== Queensland ===
| LGA | Location | km | mi | Exit (Note: Exits are numbered progressively from the Brisbane CBD.) | Destinations | Notes |
|---|---|---|---|---|---|---|
| New South Wales – Queensland state border | | 0.0 | 0.0 | | New South Wales – Queensland state border | Continues from 55.4 km above |
| Gold Coast | Tugun | 3.1 | 1.9 | 95 | Stewart Road – west – to Currumbin Creek Road (State Route 98) – Currumbin Valley; Stewart Road – east – to Gold Coast Highway (State Route 2) – Tugun, Currumbin | Diamond interchange connects to Gold Coast Highway (State Route 2) |
| Currumbin Creek | | 4.4 | 2.7 | Bridge over the river (Bridge name unknown) | | |
| Gold Coast | Elanora | 4.5 | 2.8 | 93 | K.P. McGrath Drive / Sarawak Avenue – Elanora, Palm Beach, Currumbin | |
| Gold Coast | Palm Beach | 5.9 | 3.7 | 92 | Palm Beach Avenue – Palm Beach, Elanora | |
| Tallebudgera Creek | | 8.4 | 5.2 | Bridge over the river (Bridge name unknown) | | |
| Gold Coast | Burleigh Heads | 8.7 | 5.4 | 89 | Tallebudgera Creek Road – Burleigh Heads, Tallebudgera Valley | Modified trumpet interchange |
| Gold Coast | Burleigh Heads | 10.9 | 6.8 | 87 | Southport–Burleigh Road (formerly Bermuda Street) (State Route 3) – Southport, Burleigh Heads, Robina | Diverging Diamond Interchange |
| Gold Coast | Varsity Lakes | 13.0 | 8.1 | 85 | Reedy Creek Road (State Route 80) – Burleigh Heads, Reedy Creek, Varsity Lakes | Modified trumpet interchange |
| Gold Coast | Robina | 16.1 | 10.0 | 82 | Robina Parkway (State Route 7) – Robina, Clear Island Waters | Diamond interchange |
| Mudgeeraba Creek | | 16.6 | 10.3 | Bridge over the river (Bridge name unknown) | | |
| Gold Coast | Mudgeeraba | 17.4 | 10.8 | 80 | The Link Way to Gold Coast – Springbrook Road (State Route 99) – Mudgeeraba, Springbrook National Park | Northbound exit only via a slip lane |
| Gold Coast | Mudgeeraba | 18.3 | 11.4 | 79 | Mudgeeraba Road (State Route 42) – Gilston | Modified dumbbell interchange |
| Gold Coast | Merrimac | 21.0 | 13.0 | 77 | Mudgeeraba Road (State Route 50) – south – Tallai; Gooding Drive (State Route 50) – east – Merrimac, Broadbeach | Grade-separated dumbbell interchange |
| Gold Coast | Worongary | 22.8 | 14.2 | 75 | Elysium Road – Worongary, Carrara Industrial Estate | Grade-separated dumbbell interchange |
| Gold Coast | Carrara | 24.8 | 15.4 | 73 | Alexander Drive – west – Highland Park, Gilston; Nielsens Road – east – Carrara | |
| Gold Coast | Nerang | 25.9 | 16.1 | 72 | Pappas Way – Nerang, Carrara | Formerly exit 71A |
| Gold Coast | Nerang | 27.5 | 17.1 | 71 | Nerang Connection Road (State Route 90) – west – Nerang, Beaudesert; Nerang–Broadbeach Road (State Route 90) – east – Broadbeach | Diamond interchange |
| Nerang River | | 28.2 | 17.5 | Bridge over the river (Bridge name unknown) | | |
| Gold Coast | Nerang | 29.0 | 18.0 | 69 | Southport–Nerang Road (State Route 20) – west – Nerang – east – Surfers Paradise, Ashmore, Molendinar, Southport | Southbound exit and entrance, and indirect northbound exit and entrance via Nerang Connection Road |
| Gold Coast | Gaven | 32.1 | 19.9 | 66 | Smith Street Motorway (State Route 10) – Southport, Labrador, Gaven, Sea World, Gold Coast University Hospital | Modified trumpet and grade-separated diamond interchange |
| Gold Coast | Helensvale | 35.5 | 22.1 | 62 | Gold Coast Highway (State Route 2) – Helensvale, Labrador | Modified trumpet and parclo interchange |
| Gold Coast | Helensvale | 37.9 | 23.5 | 60 | Helensvale Road – Helensvale, Oxenford, Movie World, Wet'n'Wild | |
| Gold Coast | Oxenford | 40.4 | 25.1 | 57 | Hope Island Road (State Route 4) – Hope Island | Diamond interchange |
| Gold Coast | Oxenford | 40.4 | 25.1 | 57 | Tamborine–Oxenford Road (State Route 95) – Tamborine Mountain, Oxenford | Diamond interchange |
| Coomera River | | 41.4 | 25.7 | Bridge over the river (Bridge name unknown) | | |
| Gold Coast | Coomera | 43.6 | 27.1 | 54 | Foxwell Road / Days Road – Coomera, Upper Coomera, Dreamworld | Modified parclo |
| Gold Coast | Pimpama | 48.3 | 30.0 | 49 | Pimpama–Jacobs Well Road – Pimpama, Jacobs Well | Dumbbell interchange |
| Gold Coast | Pimpama | 51.2 | 31.8 | 45 | Mirambeena Drive / Tillyroen Road – Ormeau, Jacobs Well, Norwell | Dumbbell interchange, northbound exit and southbound entrance only |
| Gold Coast | Ormeau | 53.6 | 33.3 | 45 | Eggersdorf Road / Peachey Road – Ormeau, Kingsholme, Norwell | Dumbbell interchange, northbound entrance and southbound exit only |
| Gold Coast | Yatala | 57.1 | 35.5 | 41 | Computer Road – Yatala, Stapylton, Ormeau | Dumbbell interchange |
| Gold Coast | Yatala | 60.0 | 37.3 | 38 | Stapylton – Jacobs Well Road – Yatala, Stapylton | Dumbbell interchange |
| Albert River | | 61.3 | 38.1 | Bridge over the river (Bridge name unknown) | | |
| Logan | Beenleigh | 62.3 | 38.7 | 35 | Main Street (State Route 94) – Beenleigh | Grade separated roundabout interchange |
| Logan | Beenleigh | 64.2 | 39.9 | 34 | City Road (State Route 92) – Beenleigh | Grade separated roundabout interchange |
| Logan River | | 65.6 | 40.8 | Bridge over the river (Bridge name unknown) | | |
| Logan | Loganholme | 66.8 | 41.5 | 31 | Logan Motorway (M6) – Ipswich, Toowoomba | Trumpet interchange |
| Logan | Loganholme | 68.0 | 42.3 | 30 | Beenleigh–Redland Bay Road (State Route 47) – Redland Bay, Cleveland | |
| Logan | Loganholme | 69.8 | 43.4 | 28 | Bryants Rd – Cleveland, Tanah Merah | |
| Logan | Shailer Park | 71.0 | 44.1 | 26 | Murrays Rd – Shailer Park | Northbound exit and entrance via Nujooloo Road; Southbound exit and entrance via Mandew Street (part of Exit 28) |
| Logan | Daisy Hill | 73.3 | 45.5 | 24 | Winnets Road / Loganlea Road – Daisy Hill, Loganlea, Slacks Creek | |
| Logan | Slacks Creek | 74.6 | 46.4 | 23 | Paradise Road / Chatswood Road (State Route 50) – Slacks Creek, Daisy Hill, Logan Central | Northbound entrance and southbound entrance and exit only |
| Logan | Springwood | 75.8 | 47.1 | 22 | Old Pacific Highway / Watland Street – Springwood | Southbound exit only |
| Logan | Springwood | 77.3 | 48.0 | 20 | Logan Road (State Route 30) / Fitzgerald Avenue – Springwood, Underwood | Trumpet interchange and partial diamond interchange |
| Logan | Rochedale South | 78.2 | 48.6 | 19 | Logan Road (State Route 30) / Rochedale Road – Rochedale, Underwood, Springwood | Northbound entrance and southbound exit only |
| Brisbane | Eight Mile Plains | 81.5 | 50.6 | 16 | Gateway Motorway (M1 [northeast]) – Sunshine Coast, Gympie, Brisbane Airport; Gateway Motorway (M2 [southwest]) – Ipswich, Toowoomba | Trumpet interchange. Pacific Motorway continues north as the M3. Gateway Motorway heads northeast as the M1. Heading south, the Pacific Motorway carries the M1 shield. |
| Brisbane | Eight Mile Plains | 83.4 | 51.8 | 14 | Logan Road (State Route 95) – Upper Mount Gravatt, Eight Mile Plains | |
| Brisbane | Upper Mount Gravatt | 86.6 | 53.8 | 11 | Klump Road / Mains Road (State Route 36) – Upper Mount Gravatt, Griffith University | Northbound entrance and southbound exit only |
| Brisbane | Mount Gravatt | 88.6 | 55.1 | 9 | Gaza Road – Mount Gravatt, Griffith University | Northbound exit and southbound entrance only |
| Brisbane | Holland Park West | 90.0 | 55.9 | 8 | Marshall Road (State Routes 10 and 11) – Holland Park | Northbound entrance and southbound exit only |
| Brisbane | Greenslopes | 93.0 | 57.8 | 5 | Juliette Street / Cornwall Street – Greenslopes, Annerley | Northbound exit and southbound entrance via Juliette Street; Northbound entrance and southbound exit via Cornwall Street |
| Brisbane | Woolloongabba | 94.4 | 58.7 | 4 | Clem Jones Tunnel (M7) – Sunshine Coast, Northern Suburbs, Brisbane Airport | Northbound exit and southbound entrance only |
| Brisbane | Woolloongabba | 95.0 | 59.0 | 2 | Stanley Street / Vulture Street (State Route 41) – South Brisbane, Woolloongabba, East Brisbane | Northbound exit and southbound entrance via Stanley Street; Northbound entrance and southbound exit via Vulture Street |
| Brisbane River | | 95.6 | 59.4 | Captain Cook Bridge; Concurrently Riverside Expressway north of bridge. | | |
| Brisbane | Brisbane City | 96.4 | 59.9 | | Margaret Street | |
| Brisbane | Brisbane City | 96.7 | 60.1 | | Elizabeth Street | |
| Brisbane | Brisbane City | 97.1 | 60.3 | | Turbot Street | Northbound exit only |
| Brisbane | Brisbane City | 97.4 | 60.5 | | Herschel Street | Northbound exit only |
| Brisbane | Brisbane City | 97.4 | 60.5 | | Coronation Drive | Northern terminus of the Pacific Motorway. Road continues as Coronation Drive to Milton, then continues as Hale Street / Inner City Bypass – Sunshine Coast, Brisbane Airport and Coronation Drive – Toowong, Indooroopilly |
1.000 mi = 1.609 km; 1.000 km = 0.621 mi: Concurrency terminus; Incomplete access; Tolled; Route transition

== See also ==
- Freeways in Australia
- Freeways in New South Wales
- Freeways in Brisbane
- Freeways in Gold Coast
- M1, Queensland
