= Cudgen Road Tunnel =

Tunnel in New South Wales, Australia

- Interactive map of Cudgen Road Tunnel

Overview
- Location: Stotts Creek, Tweed Valley, New South Wales, Australia
- Coordinates: 28°16′45″S 153°31′12″E
- Status: Open
- Route: Pacific Motorway

Operation
- Constructed: Abigroup
- Opened: 4 August 2002
- Owner: Transport for NSW
- Traffic: Road
- Character: Dual carriageway motorway

Technical
- Length: 134 metres (440 ft)
- No. of lanes: 4
- Operating speed: 110 kilometres per hour (68 mph)

The Cudgen Road Tunnel is a twin-tube road tunnel that forms part of the Pacific Motorway (M1) located near Stotts Creek in the Tweed Valley of New South Wales, Australia. The twin 134-metre-long (440 ft) tunnels are illuminated inside with northbound traffic using one tunnel and southbound traffic in the other. The tunnels pass under the Cudgen Road and the Condong Range.

== Features ==
It was built by Abigroup as part of the Yelgun to Chinderah upgrade of the Pacific Highway, opening on 4 August 2002. It was jointly funded by the New South Wales and Federal governments. It is the first tunnel to be built as part of a rural road project in NSW.

This alignment of the Yelgun to Chinderah motorway was aimed at avoiding the loss of prime cane land, avoiding flood-prone areas and preserving important local animal habitat. The best route was through the Condong Range. A tunnel was chosen instead of a road cutting because it was sympathetic with the surrounding environment by removing the visual impact of a road cutting.

== See also ==
- List of tunnels in Australia
