= Gold Coast Private Hospital =

- Healthscope

Geography
- Location: 14 Hill Street, Southport, Gold Coast, Australia
- Coordinates: 27°57′44″S 153°23′07″E

Organisation
- Type: General

Services
- Beds: 314

Helipads
- Helipad: No

History
- Founded: 12 March 2016

Links
- Website: www.goldcoastprivate.com.au
- Lists: Hospitals in Australia

The Gold Coast Private Hospital is a private hospital facility in Southport, Gold Coast that replaced Allamanda Private Hospital from 12 March 2016. The $230 million facility opened with 284 beds and 13 operating theatres with capacity to expand to 400 beds and 21 theatres, in line with demand.

The Emergency Care Centre is open 24/7.

The hospital is co-located with the Gold Coast University Hospital and Griffith University and is a key partner in the Gold Coast Health and Knowledge Precinct.

== Location ==
Gold Coast Private Hospital is located in the Gold Coast Health and Knowledge Precinct on 14 Hill Street, Southport. The Smith Street Motorway is located nearby.

=== Public transport ===
The Griffith University G:link (Gold Coast light rail) station is across the road from the new hospital with trams running as frequent as 8 minutes during peak times.

A bus stop located adjacent to the tram station provides bus connection to Helensvale railway station and Southport.

== Facility services ==
The hospital provides services relating to:

- Anaesthetics
- Bariatric surgery
- Breast surgery
- Cardiac surgery
- Cardiology
- Colorectal surgery
- Dermatology
- Ear, nose and throat surgery
- 24-hour emergency department
- Emergency Care Centre
- Endocrine surgery
- Endocrinology
- Gastroenterology
- General surgery
- Gynaecologic oncology
- Gynaecology
- Haematology and oncology
- Infectious diseases
- Intensive care
- IVF
- Maternity
- Neurology
- Neurosurgery
- Neonatal intensive care
- Oncology
- Ophthalmology
- Oral and maxillofacial surgery
- Orthopaedics
- Paediatrics medicine
- Paediatric surgery
- Plastic surgery
- Rehabilitation
- Renal physician
- Renal dialysis
- Respiratory medicine
- Rheumatology
- Robotic surgery
- Sleep studies
- Thoracic surgery
- Urogynaecology
- Urology
- Vascular surgery
