= Bilinga, Queensland =

Bilinga
- Suburb
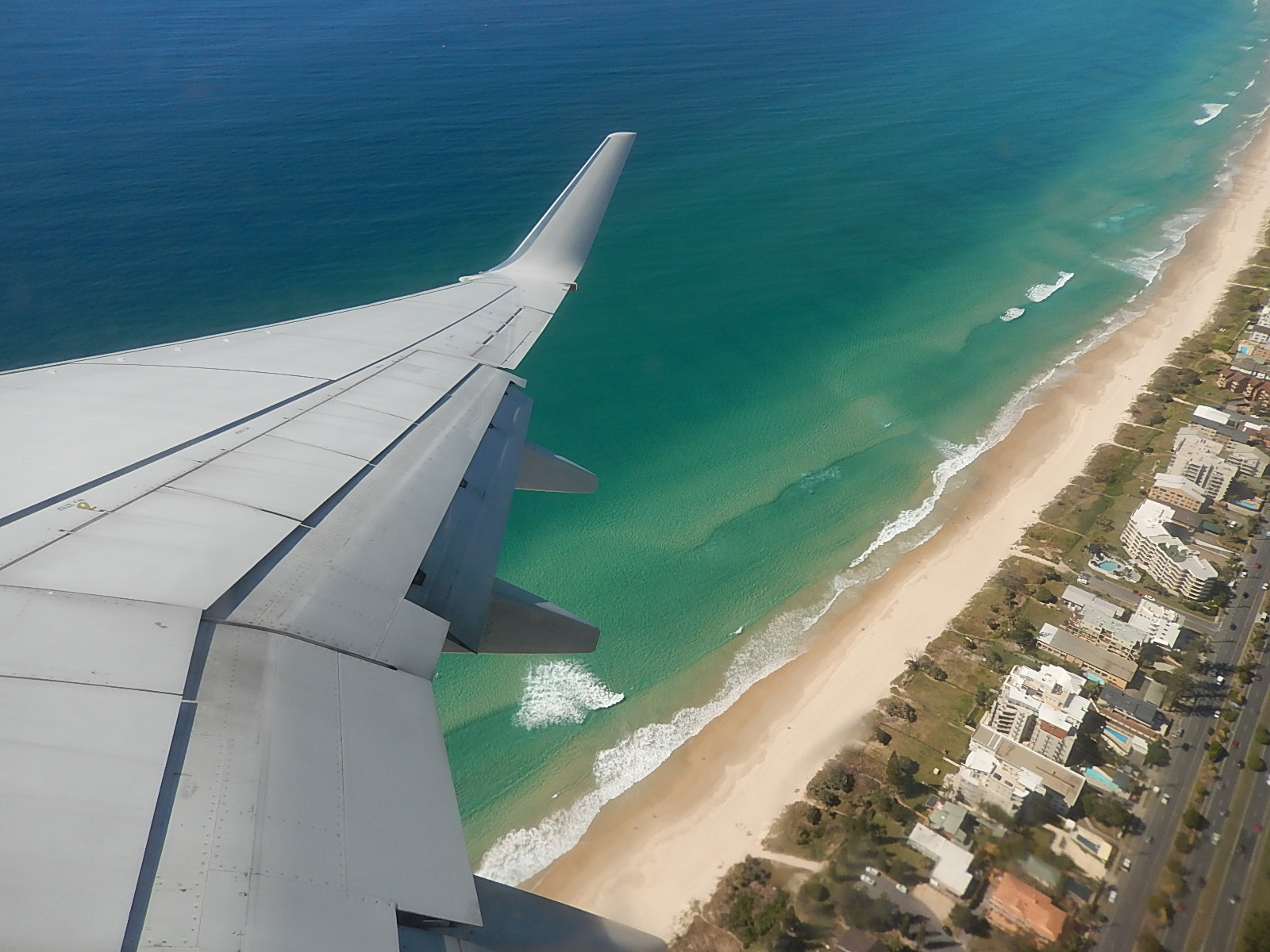
- Aerial view of Bilinga beachfront, 2013

- Interactive map of Bilinga
- Coordinates: 28.1613°S 153.5086°E
- Country: Australia
- State: Queensland
- City: Gold Coast
- LGA: City of Gold Coast
- Location: 2.8 km (1.7 mi) WNW of Coolangatta; 24.6 km (15.3 mi) SSE of Surfers Paradise; 28.1 km (17.5 mi) SSE of Southport; 98.6 km (61.3 mi) SSE of Brisbane

Government
  - State electorate: Currumbin
  - Federal division: McPherson

Area
  - Total: 2.6 km^{2} (1.0 sq mi)
- Elevation: 7 m (23 ft)

Population
  - Total: 1,883 (2021 census)
  - Density: 724/km^{2} (1,880/sq mi)
- Time zone: UTC+10:00 (AEST)
- Postcode: 4225
Suburbs around Bilinga
Tugun	Coral Sea	Coral Sea
Cobaki Lakes (NSW)	Bilinga	Coolangatta
Tweed Heads West (NSW)	Tweed Heads West (NSW)	Tweed Heads (NSW)

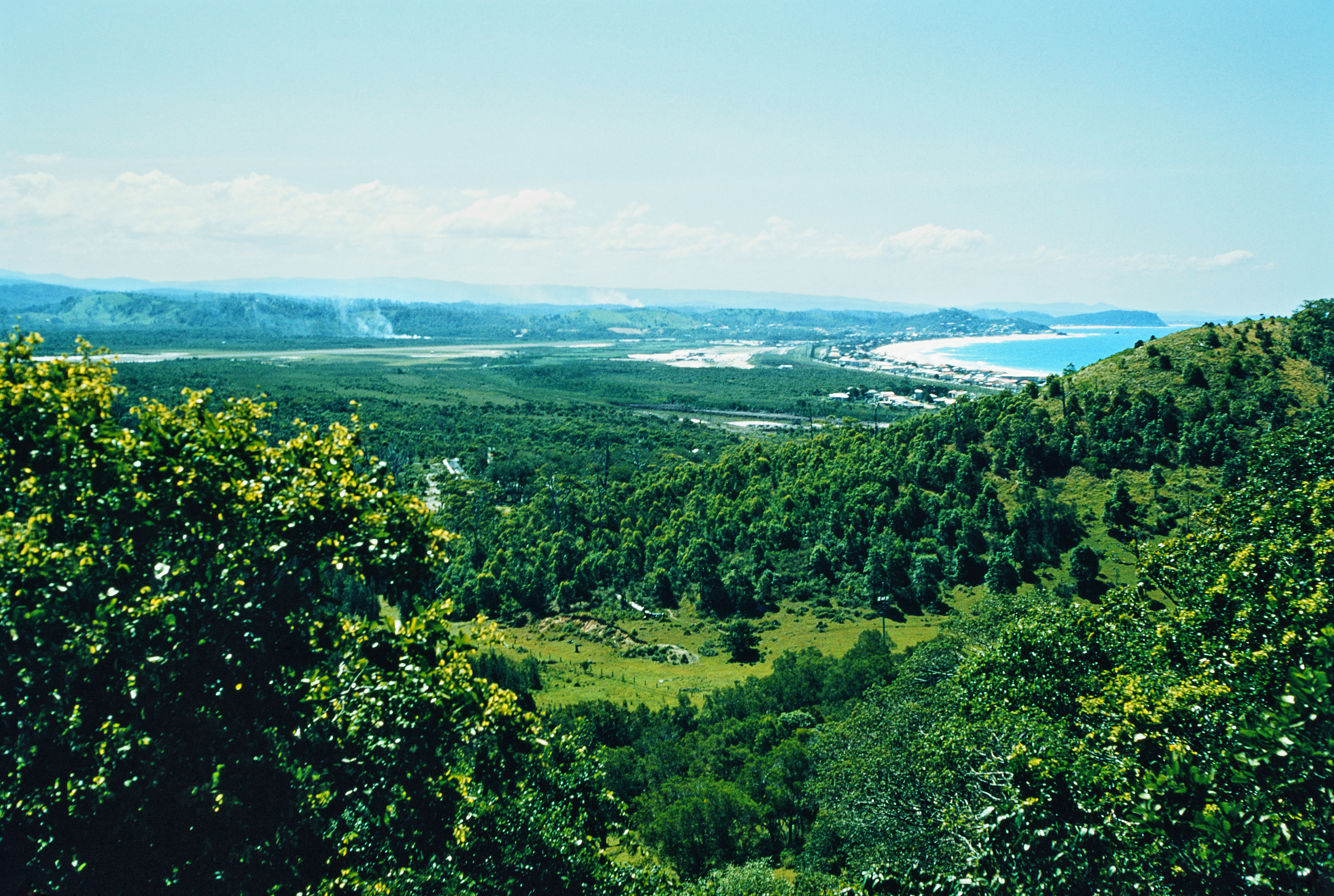
Bilinga Beach from Razorback Lookout, January 1958

Bilinga (/bəlɪnɡə/) is a southern coastal suburb in the City of Gold Coast, Queensland, Australia. It is on the border with New South Wales. In the 2021 census, Bilinga had a population of 1,883 people.

== Geography ==
Bilinga is bounded by Boyd Street to the north-west, the Coral Sea to the east, and the border with New South Wales to the west.

The entire eastern coastline of the suburb is a continuous sandy surf beach, with the northern end known as Bilinga Beach (28.1547°S 153.5067°E) and the southern end known as North Kirra Beach (28.1633°S 153.5183°E). Immediately inland from the beach is a narrow strip of housing (the only residential part of the suburb).

Gold Coast Airport (formerly the Coolangatta Airport, 28.1650°S 153.5061°E) occupies the majority of the suburb, extending across the border into Tweed Heads West in New South Wales.

The Gold Coast Desalination Plant is in the north-west of the suburb (28.158°S 153.498°E).

The Gold Coast campus (28.1684°S 153.5185°E) of the Southern Cross University (headquartered in Lismore, New South Wales) is in the south of the suburb.

The Gold Coast Highway enters the suburb from the north (Tugun) and mostly separating the residential ara from the airport and other infrastructure before exiting to the south (Tweed Heads West / Tweed Heads) towards the Pacific Motorway.

== History ==
The word "Bilinga" is derived from the word "Bilinba", meaning bats. The name was adopted in 1918 as a place name for Crown lands north of Coolangatta.

In February 1908, 5 land portions were advertised to be open for selection as agricultural farms and unconditional selections by the Department of Public Lands office. The map advertising the selection, surveyed by J.H.Jensen, shows the portions 84 to 88 situated between the South Coast railway line in the north and the tick fence to the south.

After the land sales, a rail siding was created in 1919. It was located roughly at the intersection of the Gold Coast Highway and George Street (28.1601°S 153.5110°E).

After 1919, the catalyst for an increase in development was said to be the erection of a general store, owned by businessman Percy Hanzel, near the rail siding. Furthermore, increased development could be attributed to a new coastal road, which improved access to the area for holiday makers and residents.

The drowning of a man on Bilinga Beach in 1937 led to the establishment of the Bilinga Surf Lifesaving Club in 1938.

In 1989, Bilinga received 50,000 cubic metres of sand as part of a beach nourishment program.

During 2020 and 2021, the Queensland borders were closed to most people due to the COVID-19 pandemic. Border crossing points were either closed or had a Queensland Police checkpoint to allow entry to only those people with an appropriate permit. The Gold Coast Highway at Bilinga was one of the police border checkpoints.

== Demographics ==
In the 2011 census, Bilinga had a population of 1,662 people.

In the 2016 census, Bilinga had a population of 1,804 people. The median age of the Bilinga population was 47 years, 9 years above the national median of 38. 66.8% of people were born in Australia and 78.2% of people spoke only English at home. The most common responses for religion were No Religion 27.5% and Catholic 21.5%.

In the 2021 census, Bilinga had a population of 1,883 people.

== Education ==
There are no schools in Bilinga. The nearest government primary school is Coolangatta State School in neighbouring Coolangatta to the south-east. The nearest government secondary school is Palm Beach Currumbin State High School in Palm Beach to the north-west.

The Gold Coast campus of Southern Cross University offers a range of courses in arts, health, social science, business, education, information technology, law and tourism. The university is a partner with the Gold Coast airport and other tourism-oriented businesses to offer specialised degrees and research in aviation and tourism.

== Community groups ==
Bilinga Surf Life Saving Club members patrol the beach on weekends and public holidays from September to May each year. Their clubhouse is at 257 Golden Four Drive (28.1552°S 153.5063°E) facing the beach.

North Kirra Surf Life Saving Club has their clubhouse at 41 Pacific Parade on the foreshore (28.1650°S 153.5209°E).

== Notable people ==
- Gregory Shambrook (born 1953), a rugby union player, represented Australia

== See also ==
- Suburbs of the Gold Coast
