= Tugun Bypass =

Motorway on the Gold Coast, Queensland, Australia

Tugun Bypass Pacific Motorway Queensland–New South Wales

General information
- Type: Freeway
- Location: Tugun
- Length: 7 km (4.3 mi)
- Opened: July 2008

Major junctions
- NE end: Pacific Motorway; Currumbin, Gold Coast
- SW end: Pacific Motorway; Tweed Heads, New South Wales

Highway system
- Highways in Australia; National Highway • Freeways in Australia; Highways in Queensland; Highways in New South Wales

The Tugun Bypass is a 7.5-kilometre-long (4.7 mi) stretch of motorway-grade road, bypassing through the suburb of Tugun on the Gold Coast, Queensland, Australia. The speed limit on the Tugun bypass is 100 kilometres per hour (62 mph) and provides a high-speed motorway link between the Gold Coast and northern New South Wales, separating interstate vehicles from local traffic. There is a 334-metre (1,096 ft) tunnel under the extension to the Gold Coast Airport runway. The bypass connects directly to the Pacific Motorway between the Stewart Road interchange at Currumbin and the Tweed Heads Bypass north of Kennedy Drive. Opened in 2008, it has significantly relieved traffic congestion on the Gold Coast Highway corridor. The Tugun Bypass carries the M1 designation and is officially called the "Pacific Motorway". The Tugun bypass has two vehicle lanes in each direction, with provision for widening to three lanes in the future.

== History ==
For more than 20 years the Gold Coast has grown by 17,000 permanent residents a year, placing enormous pressure on the city's infrastructure requirements, in particular the Gold Coast Highway between Currumbin and Tweed Heads. Speculation about a bypass began in the 1960s when the South Coast railway line was closed.

It was not until the Beattie Government was in office at the end of the 20th century that a firm commitment was made to the bypass. In 2003 Acting Prime Minister John Anderson and Queensland Transport Minister Steve Bredhauer announced a 50 per cent joint agreement for the project allowing the project to proceed. In May 2004 the Queensland and New South Wales Governments finally agreed to build the Tugun bypass along the western side of the Gold Coast Airport, after New South Wales reneged on an agreement signed in 2000. The New South Wales government had previously been reluctant to go ahead with the project, citing environmental and planning reasons.

While New South Wales finally agreed to the plan, it refused to contribute financially to the road. In February 2006, former Premier Peter Beattie announced the Commonwealth Government had given final approval for the road, with construction to start the following month. Beattie said the New South Wales Government imposed additional approval conditions that bumped up the price tag. The tax-payer bill was now expected to exceed $540 million, and sixteen homes in New South Wales would be demolished to make way for the road.

As part of a deal, Queensland was to fork out $7 million annual maintenance bill for the first 10 years. At the 10th year, in June 2018, the bypass was handed over to the NSW Government.

== Construction and design ==
The Pacific Link Alliance consortium won the contract to work with the Department of Main Roads to design and build the road, complete with tunnel and bridges over Hidden Valley. Work on the 334-metre-long (1,096 ft) tunnel began in early June 2006, using a low headroom hydraulic cutting machine—one of two in the world—to meet the conditions of working so close to protected airspace.

The tunnel was built with provision for a future rail line underneath. The Tugun Bypass was intended to be open to traffic on 2 June 2008 but was delayed until important line marking could be carried out at either end of the new road. Line marking could not be performed at the expected time due to wet weather. The bypass finally opened during the afternoon of 3 June 2008.

To address operational issues with overheight vehicles attempting to enter the tunnel - particularly from the Queensland side - new turning areas were constructed near the northbound and southbound tunnel entrances. Overheight detection systems were installed to activate variable speed signs to prevent entry, along with five new advance warning signs and traffic lights.

The design includes an amphibian fence about 40 centimetres (16 in) in height with an adjacent rock aggregate to suppress vegetation. A small fauna underpass was also incorporated into the design to allow for the movement of the wallum sedge frog.

=== Funding ===
The project is jointly funded by the Queensland Government 78% and the Australian Government 22% at a cost of $543 million. Despite over 60% of the road being within New South Wales, there was no financial contribution towards the road from the Government of New South Wales.

=== Border marker ===
On the Tugun bypass, there is a big "eye-catching and unique" border marker called Hyphen that looks like a very tall and bent metal structure that sits in the median on the border of Queensland and New South Wales.

== Controversy ==
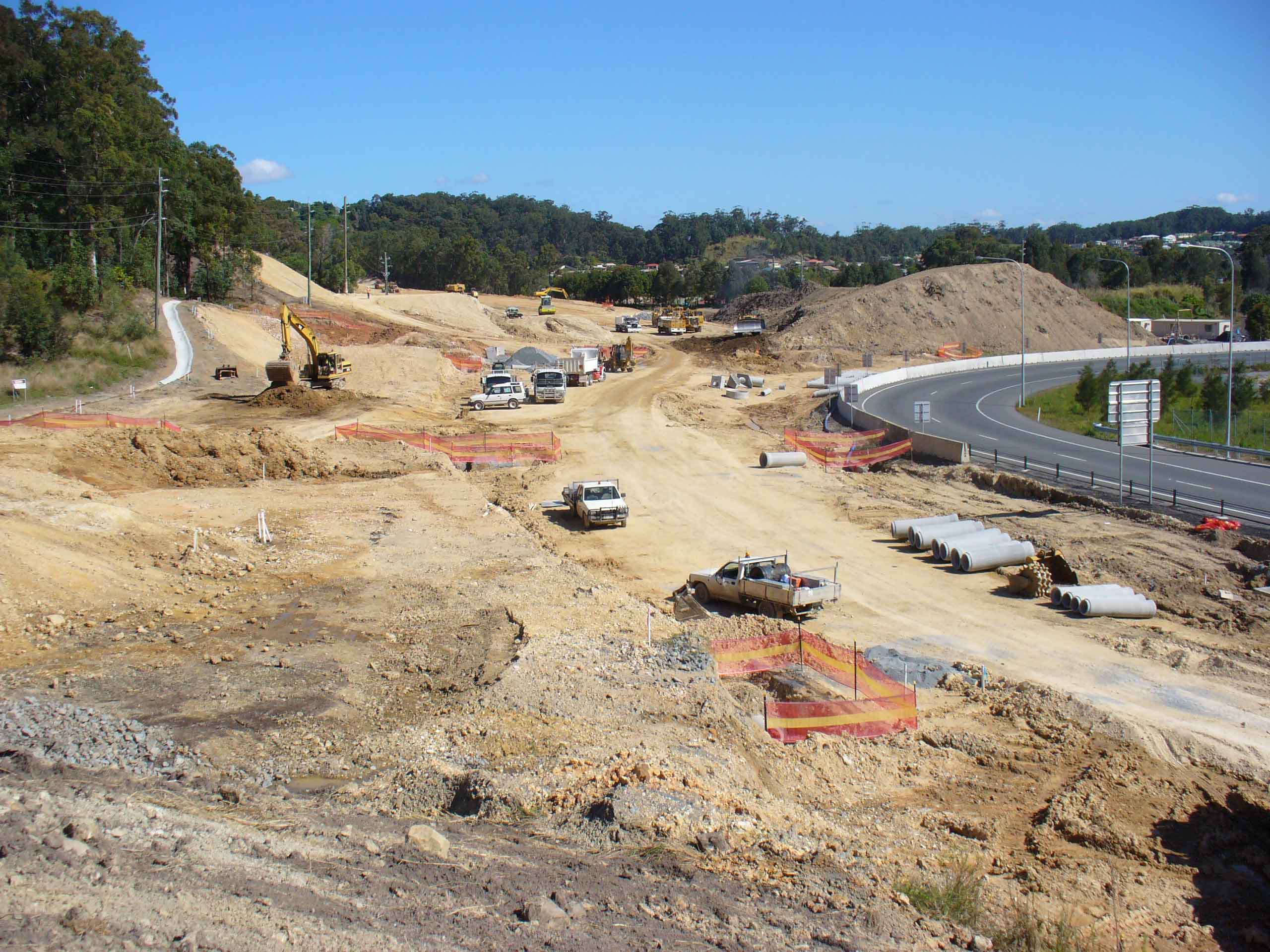
Early earthworks at Stewart Road,Currumbin.

On Sunday 18 May 2008, three days prior to the commencement of that year's State of Origin rugby league tournament, the New South Wales State Government mailed the Queensland Government with a land tax invoice of $235,607.40 for building part of the Tugun Bypass on NSW land. Queensland Premier Anna Bligh confirmed that the bill would be ignored by Queensland because they did not contribute to the $543 million project, saying: "I don't expect the Maroons to give an inch to the New South Wales Blues this week, and I don't intend to either." Of the $543 million it cost to build the bypass, the Federal Government contributed $120 million and Queensland paid the balance. Approximately 4 kilometres (2.5 mi) of the 7-kilometre (4.3 mi) bypass is located in New South Wales. "Of the total expenditure, $380 million – or 70 per cent – was spent in New South Wales," Ms Bligh said.

The NSW Office of State Revenue issued the bill to the Queensland Government on 6 May, asking for the payment for five years worth of land tax assessments. The NSW Chief Commissioner of State Revenue Tony Newbury said Queensland could pay in three instalments of $78,535.80 over the next three months. "Failure to comply with the payment options . . . will result in the imposition of interest and the instalment plan will be cancelled. Interest will be imposed on any outstanding land tax or penalty tax. The current rate is 14.37 per cent per annum calculated daily," he said. The assessments related to sixteen properties in the Tweed Shire bought by the Department of Main Roads from 2001 for the bypass construction. Queensland Treasurer Andrew Fraser said at the time of the acquisition of the sixteen properties, the NSW Government provided a transfer duty exemption to Queensland.
