= Gregory Shambrook =

- Born: Gregory George Shambrook; 3 January 1953 Bilinga, Queensland
- Height: 5'9
- Weight: 140 lb (64 kg)
- Occupation: Chiropractor

Rugby union career
- Position: centre
International career
Years	Team	Apps	(Points)
1976	Wallabies	2	(0)

Gregory George Shambrook (born 3 January 1953) was a rugby union player who represented Australia.

Shambrook, a centre, was born in Bilinga, Queensland and claimed a total of 2 international rugby caps for Australia.
