= Southport–Nerang Road =

Road in Queensland, Australia

Southport–Nerang Road Queensland

General information
- Type: Road
- Length: 9.2 km (5.7 mi)
- Route number(s): State Route 20

Major junctions
- East end: Gold Coast Highway, Southport
- Southport–Burleigh Road Olsen Avenue / Currumbura Road; Ashmore Road Pacific Motorway
- West end: Beaudesert–Nerang Road, Nerang

Location(s)
- Major suburbs: Nerang, Ashmore, Southport

Southport–Nerang Road (State Route 20) is a major arterial road on the Gold Coast, Queensland that connects the outlying suburb of Nerang with Southport, the Gold Coast's Central Business District.

It is a state-controlled road (number 106) of which part is in the regional network and part in the district network. It is rated as a local road of regional significance (LRRS).

== Route description ==
Southport–Nerang Road commences in Nerang, after the intersection with Beaudesert–Nerang Road (State Route 90) and continue easterly for 9.2 kilometers before terminating at the Gold Coast Highway (State Route 2) in Southport.

The road includes several former suburban roads before the route was designated State Route 20 and re-named Southport–Nerang Road and is still known at parts under its former names. For 1.7 kilometers between the Intersection of Wardoo Street and Queen Street the route is known as Nerang Street and 1.5 kilometers the route is known as Queen Street before briefly being called Ada Bell Way before finally terminating at the Gold Coast Highway.

== Major Intersections ==
The road is in the Gold Coast local government area.

Location	km	mi	Destinations	Notes
Nerang	0	0.0	Beaudesert–Nerang Road Westbound – Beaudesert	Western terminus of road
Nerang	1.1	0.68	Pacific Motorway Northbound Gaven, Southbound – Carrara	
Ashmore	3.4	2.1	Ashmore Road; Northbound – Molendinar, Southbound – Bundall	
Ashmore	5.3	3.3	Olsen Avenue/ Currumbura Road; Northbound – Parkwood, Southbound – Ashmore	
Southport	6.3	3.9	Wardoo Street	Route becomes known as Nerang Street from this intersection
Southport	8	5.0	Queen Street	Route becomes known as Queen Street from this intersection
Southport	8.4	5.2	Southport–Burleigh Road; Northbound – Smith Street, Southbound – Bundall	
Southport	9.2	5.7	Gold Coast Highway; Northbound – Labrador, Southbound – Main Beach	Eastern terminus of road
1.000 mi = 1.609 km; 1.000 km = 0.621 mi

== See also ==
- List of road routes in Queensland
- List of numbered roads in Queensland
