= Gold Coast Highway =

Road in Queensland, Australia

Gold Coast Highway Queensland–New South Wales
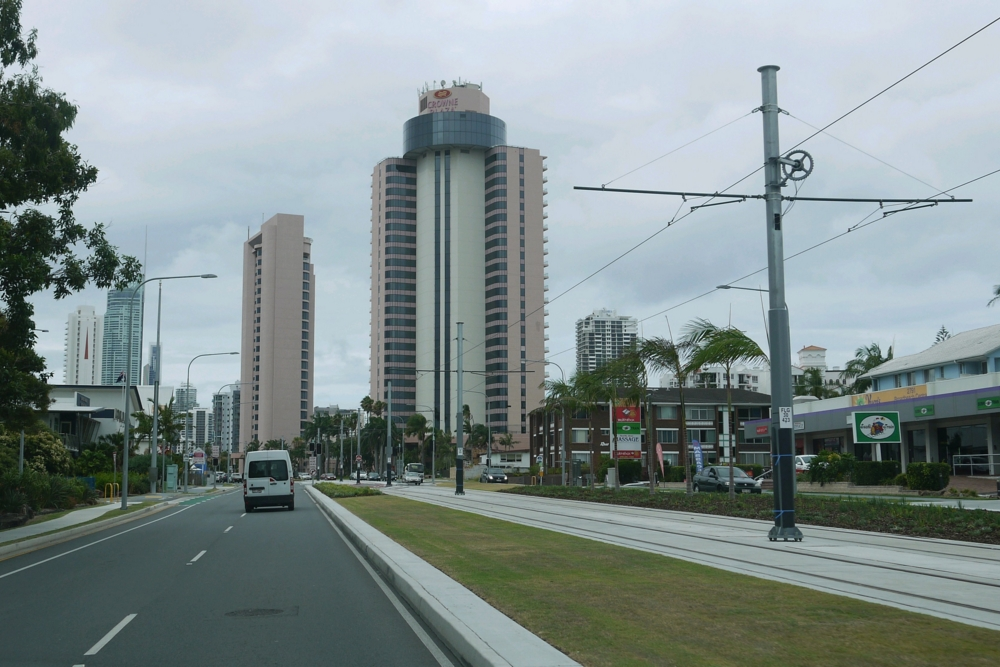
- Gold Coast Highway at Second Avenue looking north towards Surfers Paradise, featuring the Light Rail in the median

General information
- Type: Highway
- Length: 39.6 km (25 mi)
- Route number(s): State Route 2
- Former route number: State route 87; National Route 1; Alternate National Route 1

Major junctions
- North end: Binstead Way; Oxenford, Queensland
- Pacific Motorway; Olsen Avenue; Oxley Drive; North Street; Ada Bell Way; Hooker Boulevard; West Burleigh Road; Duringan Street; Tugun Currumbin Road; Pacific Motorway
- South end: Sugarwood Drive; Tweed Heads West, New South Wales

Location(s)
- Major suburbs: Southport, Surfers Paradise, Broadbeach, Burleigh Heads

Highway system
- Highways in Australia; National Highway • Freeways in Australia; Highways in Queensland; Highways in New South Wales

Gold Coast Highway is an arterial road on the Gold Coast, Queensland, Australia. It links Helensvale to Tweed Heads West, and connects many coastal Gold Coast suburbs. The route begins west of Pacific Motorway in Helensvale and runs 40 kilometres (25 mi), primarily along the coast, to across the border of New South Wales to the Tweed Heads suburb of Tweed Heads West.

The highway passes through light industrial, commercial, residential and tourist areas. The highest level of elevation on the route is 42 metres (138 ft) in Currumbin, and the lowest is 3 metres (9.8 ft) in Southport. The G:link light rail line runs along the highway between Southport and Burleigh Heads.

== History ==
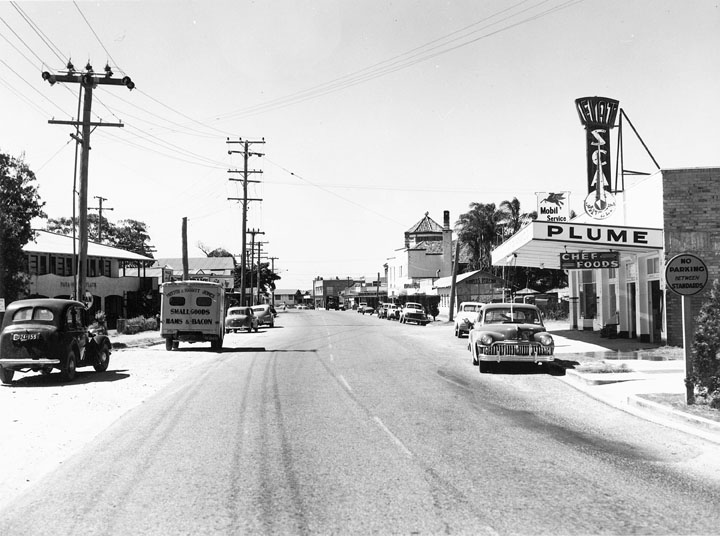
Pacific Highway in Surfers Paradise in 1952

Gold Coast Highway has existed since 1963, when the Main Roads Department reclassified much of Queensland’s road system.

When the highway was first declared, it was only a two-lane road along its entire length. The first section of dual carriageway to be built stretched from North Street, Southport, to Fern Street, Surfers Paradise. completed in 1966. In the late 1960s and early 1970s, duplication was extended south to Burleigh Heads, and the highway through Palm Beach and Bilinga was also duplicated at this time. In 1974, new bridges were built at Tallebudgera and Currumbin Creeks. In 1985, alongside the extension of Pacific Highway from Reedy Creek to Tugun, the last section south of Southport was completed, from Winders Avenue to Kitchener Street in Tugun.

The section between Tugun in Queensland and Tweed Heads West in New South Wales was formerly part of Pacific Highway. The first stage of the Tweed Heads bypass, a two-lane road connecting Pacific Highway (today Coolangatta Road) at Bilinga across the border to Kennedy Drive at Tweed Heads West, was opened in 1985 at a total cost of $3.6mil, with the second carriageway completed in December 1986; the second stage, bypassing Tweed Heads South connecting Kennedy Drive over Terrenora Creek to Pacific Highway (today Minjungbal Drive, renamed 19 February 1997) was completed on 15 November 1992, at a total cost of $46 mi, and Pacific Highway redefined to use this new alignment.

The Tugun Bypass, connecting Pacific Motorway at Tugun Hill in Queensland to Pacific Highway about 1 kilometre north of the interchange with Kennedy Drive at Tweed Heads West in New South Wales, opened in June 2008, extending the motorway around (and under) the Gold Coast Airport. The former alignment of Pacific Highway within Queensland was quickly re-declared as part of Gold Coast Highway; the New South Wales government eventually followed a year later.

The passing of the Roads Act of 1993 through the Parliament of New South Wales updated road classifications and the way they could be declared within New South Wales. Under this act, Gold Coast Highway was declared as State Highway 31 on 1 May 2009, from the state border with Queensland to the interchange with Pacific Motorway at Tweed Heads West, subsuming the former alignment of State Highway 10 (the Pacific Highway, which was re-declared to use the Tugun bypass). The highway today, as Highway 31, still retains this declaration.

== Road conditions ==
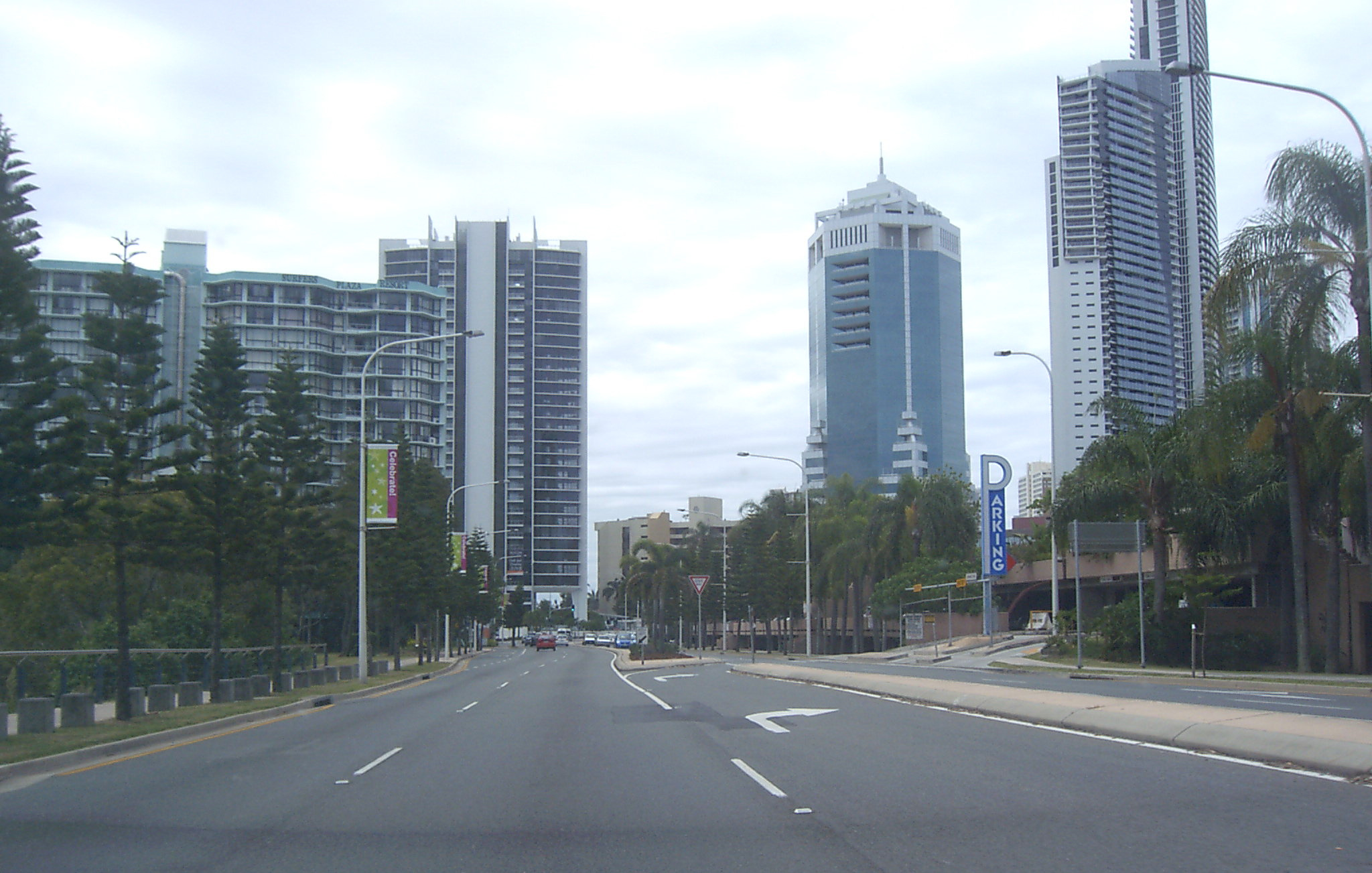
Northbound towards Beach Road, Surfers Paradise

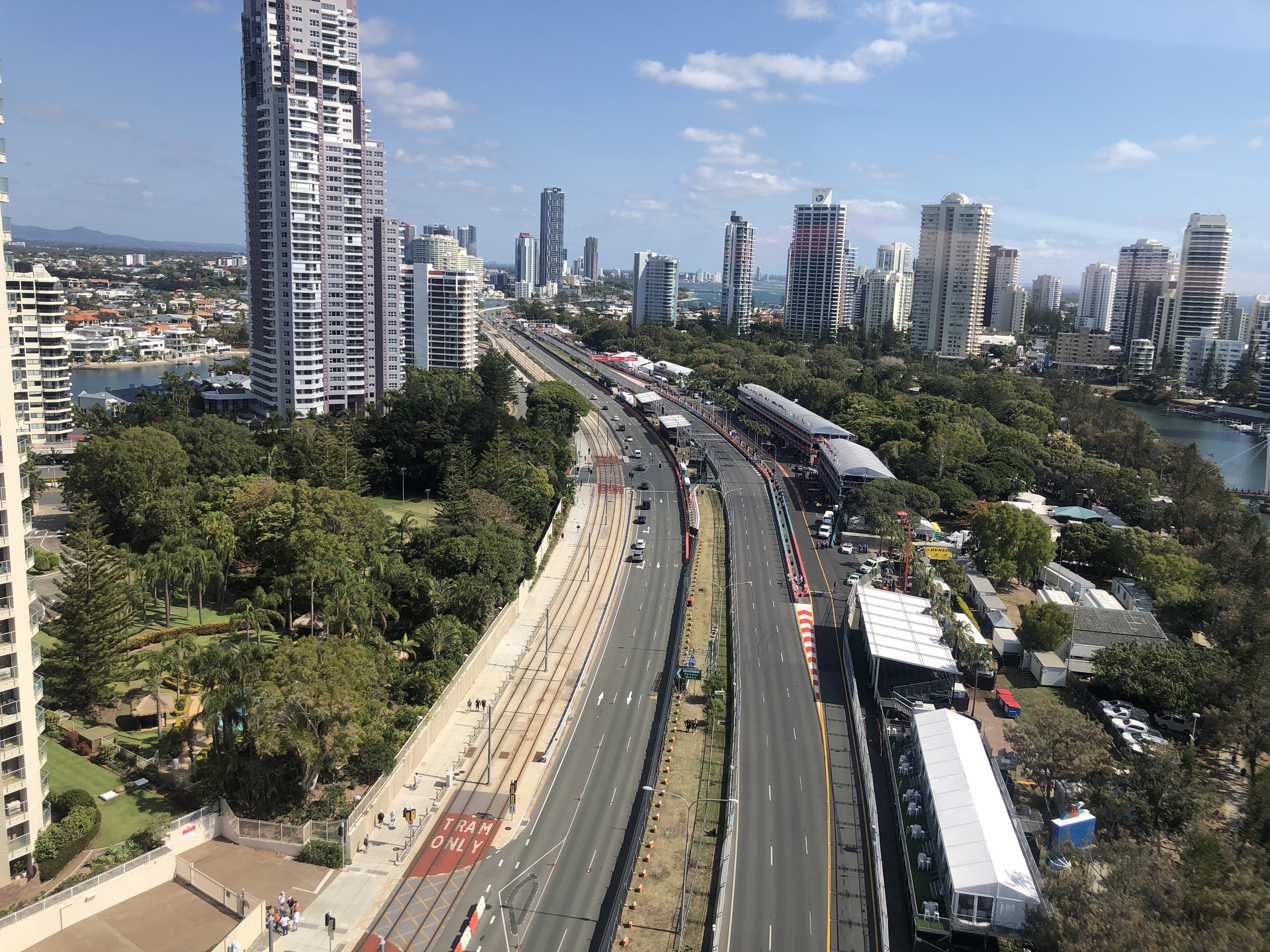
An aerial view of the highway as seen from a helicopter during the Gold Coast 600 in 2019.

The highway is divided along the entire length, mostly with four lanes. There are some six lane segments (often as bus lanes). It is also predominantly well lit at night, with a few exceptions such as Currumbin and Burleigh Heads. Median fencing to prevent pedestrians crossing has also been introduced in areas such as Mermaid Beach. The highway at Surfers Paradise is subject to congestion during events, notably during the Gold Coast 500 held each October when part of the highway becomes part of the Surfers Paradise Street Circuit at Paradise Waters. The highway width is reduced to two lanes (one carriageway) and the speed limit reduced to 40 km/h.

== Projects and improvements ==
1. Labrador: Between Government Road and North Street, along a section mostly called Frank Street. The Highway was upgraded from a single carriageway to a divided 4 lane highway. A new bridge with a 4 lane crossing was completed across Loders Creek in 2007. The road upgrade resulted in a thoroughfare similar to that in Surfers Paradise, with a narrow median and narrow road reserve due to limited space and to minimise property resumptions. One of the two lanes in each direction was initially designated a transit lane (buses and vehicles with 2 or more occupants), but this designation was removed in 2013.

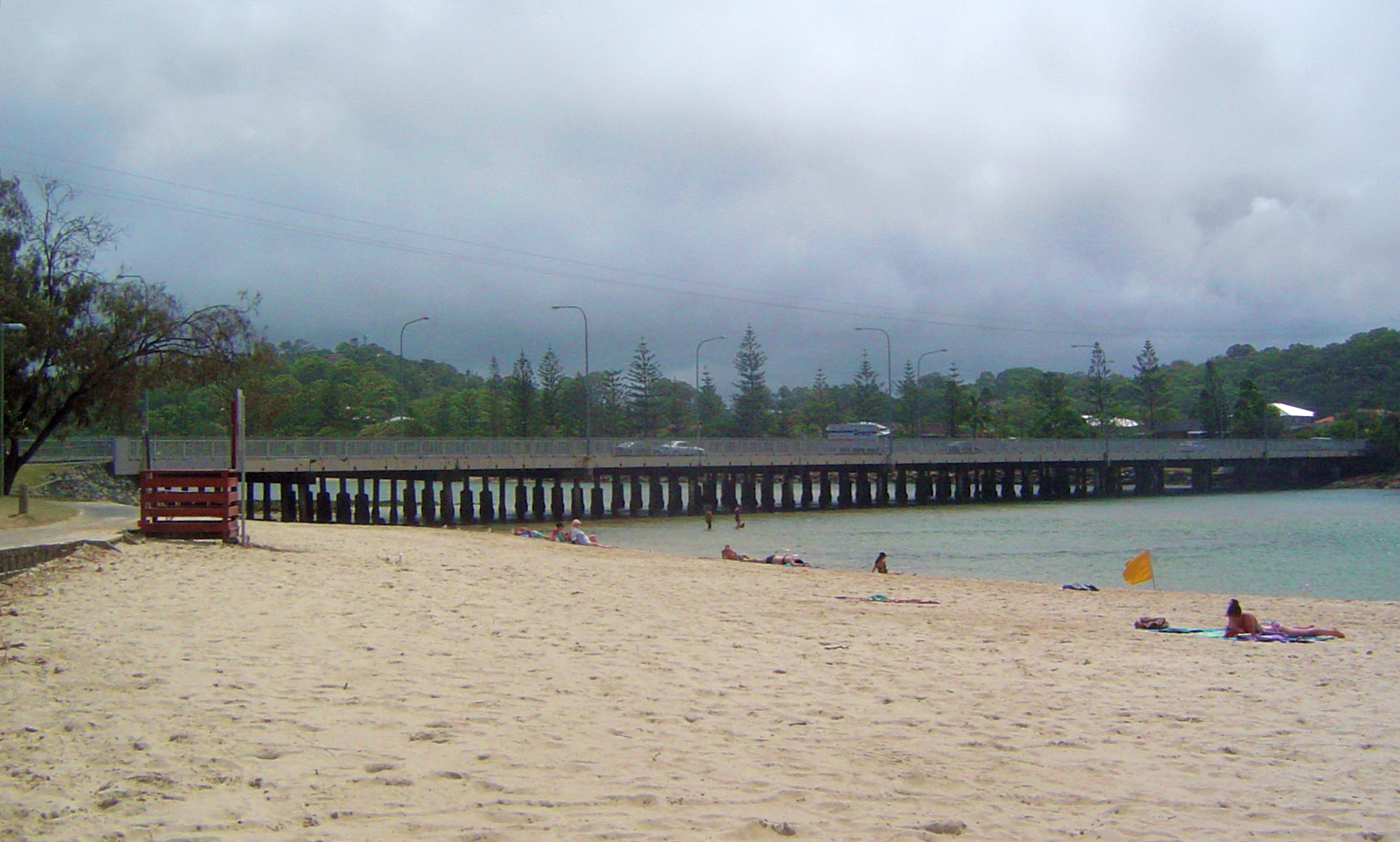
Bridge over Tallebudgera Creek

2. Broadbeach to Miami: Bus lanes were added along the route as well as changes to bus stops, u-turns, traffic lights, signs, lighting and the median strip. The first phase (Alexandra Avenue to Hilda Street) was finished in mid September 2008. The second phase (Hilda Street to Chairlift Avenue) was largely completed in July 2009.

3. Tugun: The most notorious bottle-neck was at Tugun, where the Gold Coast Highway joins the Pacific Highway 8 kilometres (5.0 mi) north of Coolangatta was eliminated with the opening of the Tugun Bypass in June 2008. Some minor changes and improvements near Stewart Road in Tugun have coincided with the completion of the bypass to deal with the changed traffic flow.

== Upgrade projects ==
=== Oxley Drive and Olsen Avenue intersection ===
A project to upgrade the intersection of Oxley Drive and Olsen Avenue at the Gold Coast Highway in Biggera Waters, at a cost of $10.68 million, was completed in mid-2021.

=== Toolona Street intersection ===
A project to upgrade the Toolona Street intersection in Tugun, at a cost of $1.5 million, started in September 2021.

== Public transport ==
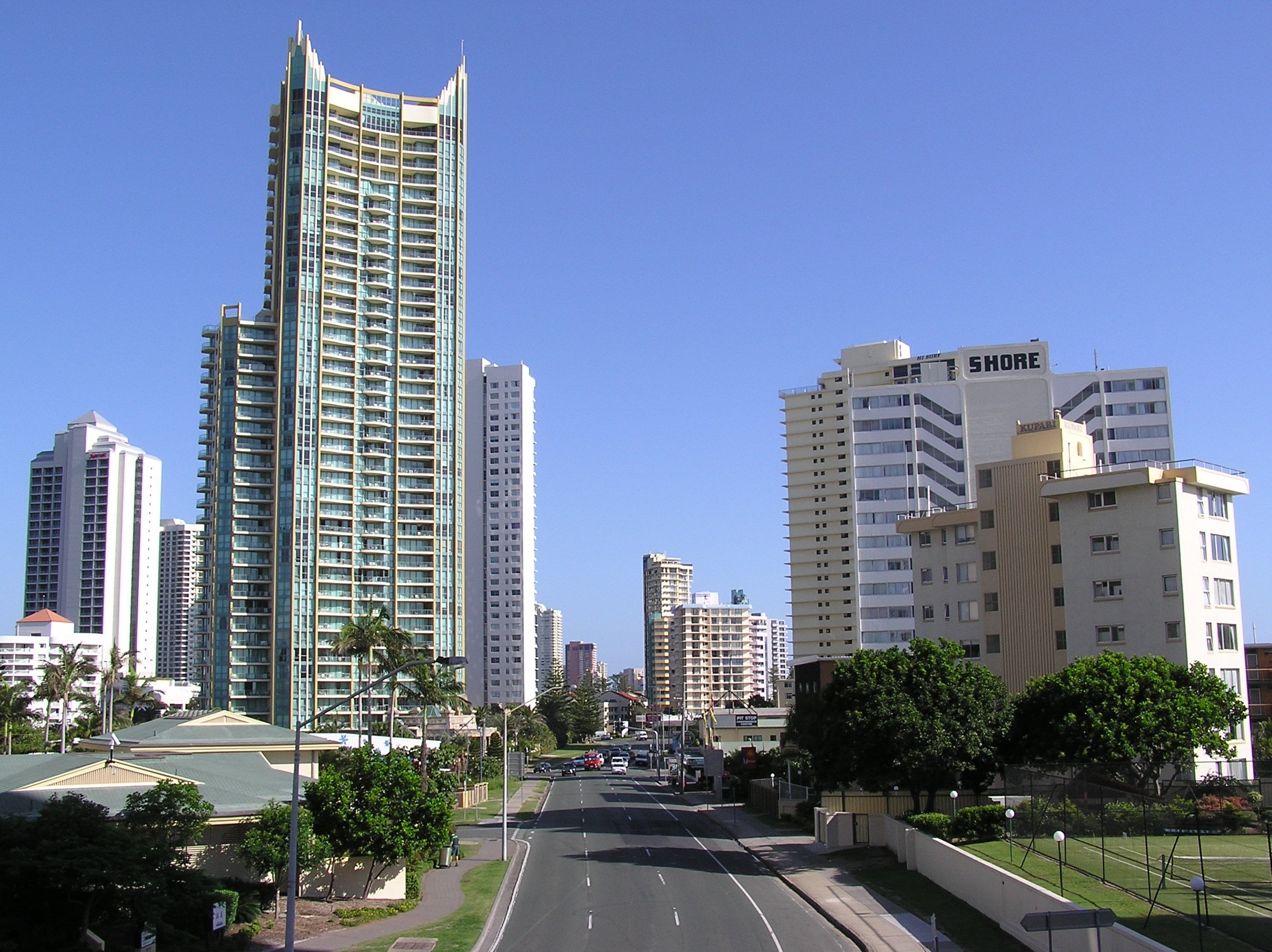
Gold Coast Highway looking south near Birt Ave with Sun City building on the left. Image taken in 2007, before the upgrade. This section of the highway is now 2 lanes each way.

=== Bus ===
Bus services throughout the area are operated by Kinetic Gold Coast. Route 700 operates along the highway between Broadbeach South and Tweed Heads. On Sunday to Thursday nights it continues north of Broadbeach South to the Gold Coast University Hospital. It is complemented by limited stops route 777 from Broadbeach South to Gold Coast Airport.

Bus Lanes are in place along some sections of the highway, particularly Broadbeach to Mermaid Beach and Miami.

=== Light Rail ===
The G:link light rail line opened in July 2014 between Gold Coast University Hospital and Broadbeach South. It has its own reservation to the west of the Gold Coast Highway from Southport to Surfers Paradise, from where it diverges onto Surfers Paradise Boulevard. It then rejoins the Gold Coast Highway at the south end of Surfers Paradise proceeding via a reservation in the median strip to Broadbeach North before crossing again to the western side to terminate at Broadbeach South. The northern extension to Helensvale opened in December 2017.

=== Railway ===
Helensvale railway station is located near the northern end of the highway. It is on the Gold Coast railway line with services operating frequently along the electrified line between Brisbane and Varsity Lakes.

=== Air ===
Gold Coast Airport is located at the southern end of the highway. It has frequent flights to Sydney and Melbourne as well as international services to New Zealand, Japan and South-East Asia.

== Major intersections ==
State	LGA	Location	km	mi	Destinations	Notes
Queensland	Gold Coast	Oxenford–Gaven boundary	0	0.0	Binstead Way (west) – Pacific Pines, Maudsland	Northwestern terminus of highway and State Route 2
Queensland	Gold Coast	Oxenford–Gaven boundary	0	0.0	Entertainment Road (north) – Oxenford; Heslop Road (south) – Gaven	Northbound entry to Pacific Motorway via Entertainment Road; Northbound exit from Pacific Motorway via Heslop Road
Queensland	Gold Coast	Oxenford–Gaven–Helensvale tripoint	0.2	0.12	Pacific Motorway (M1) – Coolangatta, Nerang, Brisbane	Interchange also provides limited access to Westfield Helensvale
Queensland	Gold Coast	Helensvale	1.1	0.68	Discovery Drive (north) – Helensvale; Town Centre Drive (south) – Westfield Helensvale	
Queensland	Gold Coast	Helensvale	1.5	0.93	Gold Coast railway line	
Queensland	Gold Coast	Arundel–Biggera Waters–Labrador tripoint	6.9	4.3	Olsen Avenue (State Route 4 south) – Ashmore, Broadbeach, Carrara; Oxley Drive (State Route 4 north) – Runaway Bay, Hope Island	Parts of the road west and east of this intersection are alternatively named Brisbane Road
Queensland	Gold Coast	Southport	11.2	7.0	North Street, to Smith Street Motorway (State Route 10) – Gaven, Brisbane, Coolangatta, Nerang	Parts of the road north of this intersection are alternatively named Frank Street; Parts of the road south of this intersection are alternatively named Marine Parade
Queensland	Gold Coast	Southport	12.7	7.9	Ada Bell Way, to Queen Street (State Route 20) – Nerang	Parts of the road south of this intersection are alternatively named Ferny Avenue and Remembrance Drive
Queensland	Nerang River		13.1– 13.4	8.1– 8.3	Sundale Bridge	
Queensland	Gold Coast	Surfers Paradise	17.0	10.6	Via Roma (State Route 24) – Bundall	
Queensland	Gold Coast	Broadbeach	20.0	12.4	Hooker Boulevard (State Route 90) – Nerang, Beaudesert, Warwick, Brisbane	
Queensland	Gold Coast	Burleigh Heads	26.4	16.4	West Burleigh Road (State Route 80) – Reedy Creek, Nerang, Brisbane	Parts of the road south of this intersection are alternatively named Tweed Street
Queensland	Tallebudgera Creek		28.0– 28.1	17.4– 17.5	Bridge name unknown	
Queensland	Currumbin Creek		32.4– 32.6	20.1– 20.3	Estuary Bridge	
Queensland	Gold Coast	Currumbin	32.7	20.3	Duringan Street, to Currumbin Creek Road (State Route 98) – Currumbin Valley	
Queensland	Gold Coast	Tugun	34.2	21.3	Stewart Road – Nerang, Brisbane	
Queensland	Gold Coast	Bilinga	37.7	23.4	Terminal Avenue – Gold Coast Airport	
Queensland	Gold Coast	Bilinga	38.1	23.7	Coolangatta Road – Coolangatta, Tweed Heads	No right turn northbound into Coolangatta Road
State border			38.5	23.9	Queensland – New South Wales state border	
New South Wales	Tweed	Tweed Heads West	39.6	24.6	Pacific Motorway (M1) – Brisbane, Tweed Heads South, Ballina	
New South Wales	Tweed	Tweed Heads West	39.6	24.6	Sugarwood Drive – Tweed Heads West	Southern end of Gold Coast Highway and State Route 2
1.000 mi = 1.609 km; 1.000 km = 0.621 mi: Incomplete access; Route transition

== Trivia ==
- Musician David Grohl was famously arrested in a northern Surfers Paradise section of the Gold Coast Highway after electing to drunkenly ride back to his band's Marriott hotel on a rented moped scooter following the Foo Fighters' performance at the Big Day Out in January 2000. Grohl reportedly blew an alcohol level of 0.095 at a sobriety checkpoint on the Gold Coast Highway and was subsequently jailed for one night.

== See also ==
- Highways in Australia
  - List of highways in Queensland
