= Tugun, Queensland =

Tugun
- Suburb
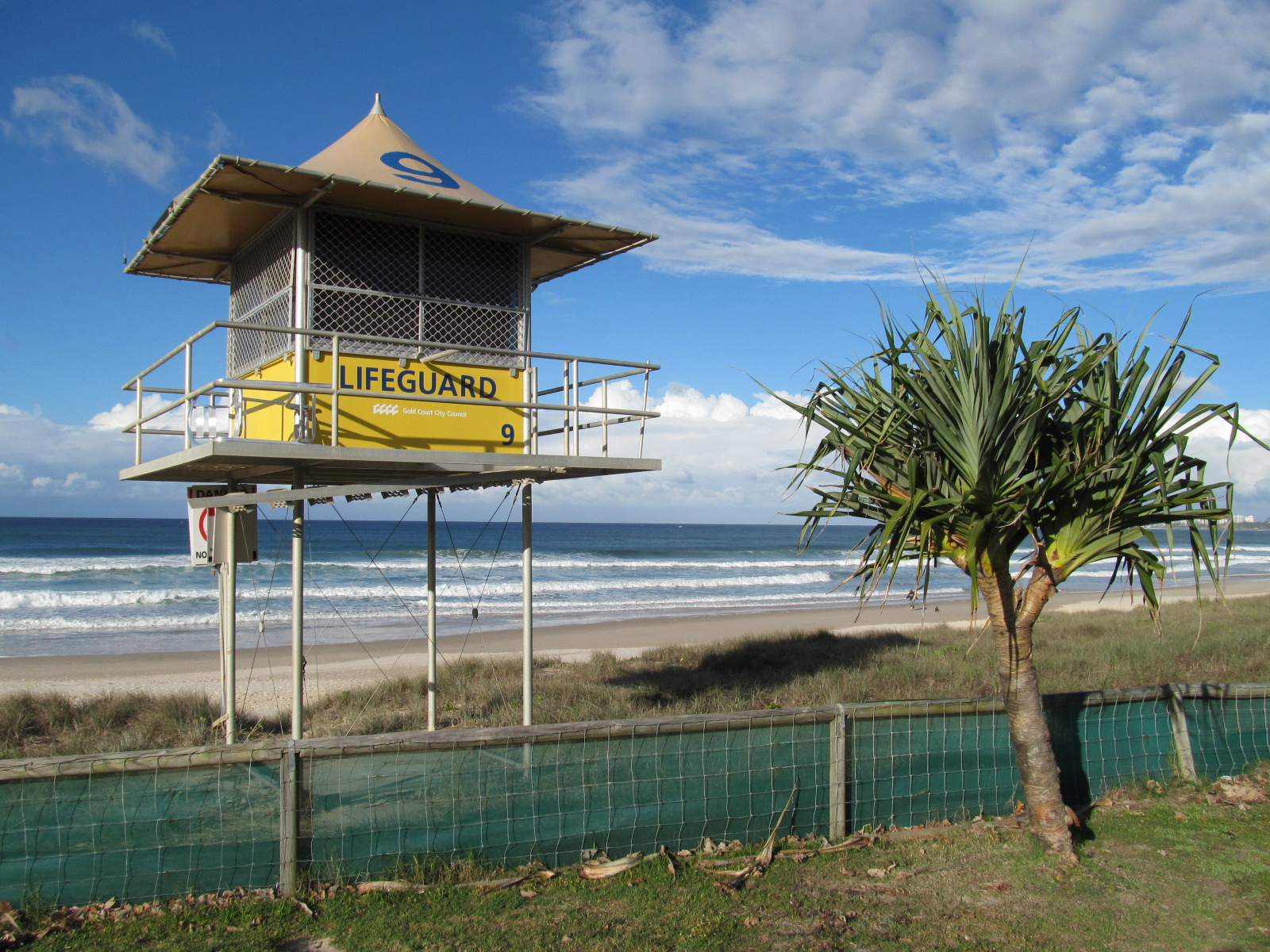
- Lifeguard lookout tower on Tugun Beach, 2013

- Interactive map of Tugun
- Coordinates: 28.1488°S 153.4936°E
- Country: Australia
- State: Queensland
- City: Gold Coast
- LGA: City of Gold Coast
- Location: 5.1 km (3.2 mi) NW of Coolangatta; 19.9 km (12.4 mi) S of Surfers Paradise; 24.0 km (14.9 mi) S of Southport; 97 km (60 mi) SE of Brisbane

Government
  - State electorate: Currumbin
  - Federal division: McPherson

Area
  - Total: 3.0 km^{2} (1.2 sq mi)
- Elevation: 0–50 m (0–164 ft)

Population
  - Total: 7,175 (2021 census)
  - Density: 2,390/km^{2} (6,190/sq mi)
- Time zone: UTC+10:00 (AEST)
- Postcode: 4224
Suburbs around Tugun
Currumbin Waters	Currumbin	Coral Sea
Currumbin Waters	Tugun	Coral Sea
Cobaki Lakes (NSW)	Cobaki Lakes (NSW)	Bilinga

Tugun (/ˈtjuːɡən, ˈtuː-/ TEW-gən, TOO-) is a beach-side coastal suburb in the City of Gold Coast, Queensland, Australia. In the 2021 census, Tugun had a population of 7,175 people.

It borders New South Wales. Some locals refer to the suburb by the nickname of Tugz (pronounced CHOOGZ).

== Geography ==
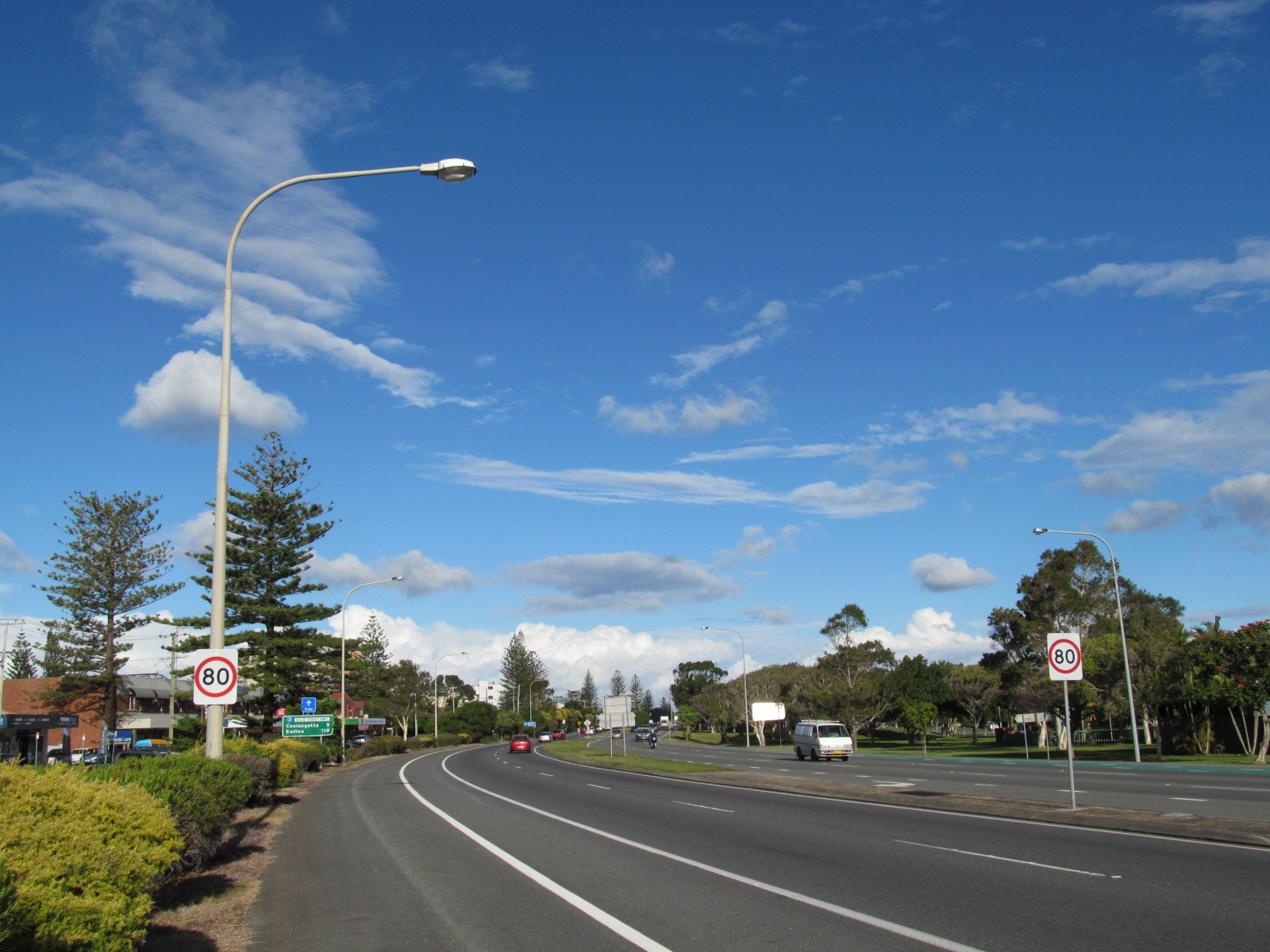
The Gold Coast Highway at Tugun, 2013

Tugun is situated at the junction of the Pacific and Gold Coast highways 7 kilometres (4.3 mi) north-west of Coolangatta and 97 kilometres (60 mi) south of Brisbane, the state capital.

Tugun Heights is a neighbourhood in the western and more elevated parts of the suburb (28.1516°S 153.485°E).

Flat Rock is a flat rocky area along the beach that marks the boundary between Tugun and neighbouring Currumbin to the north (28.1375°S 153.4930°E).

Tugun Beach (28.1424°S 153.4964°E) extends from Flat Rock south to the boundary with neighbouring Bilinga to the south-east, although the beach itself continues along the Bilinga coast but is known there as Bilinga Beach.

Tugun is a popular vacation spot, featuring several holiday units and motels along Tugun Beach. The area also boasts a variety of shops situated along its Golden-Four Drive stretch. The Jolly Swagman motel owner proposed naming the section of the former Brisbane to Sydney Highway nearest the beaches "Golden Four Drive." A new highway was constructed further to the west and the local Council consulted with the community for suggestions about naming the bypassed section of the older highway. "Golden Four" was a local name that referred to the four southern golden beaches of Tugun Beach, Bilinga Beach, North Kirra Beach (in Bilinga), and Kirra Beach (in Kirra).

The Gold Coast Oceanway, a pedestrian and cyclist pathway, connects Tugun with neighbouring Currumbin and Bilinga.

== History ==
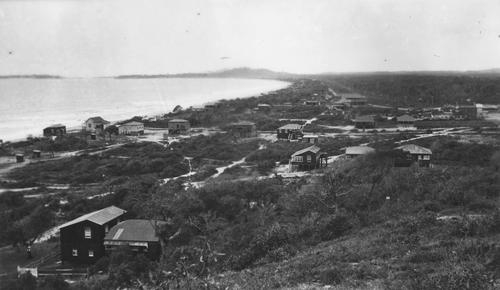
Homes in the sandhills of Tugun Beach, 1926

The name Tugun is believed to have derived from an Indigenous word of unknown dialect meaning "breaking waves".

Tugun Baptist Church opened in February 1925 on two parcels of land donated by Mrs J. H. Morgan.

In 1959, St Monica's Catholic Church was opened, able to accommodate 150 people. In 1970, it was extended by half. In 1990, it was re-oriented and extended by half again. In 1996, St Monica's Samaritan Centre was established beside the church; it is used by Centacare to provided services for disabled people.

Tugun Bowls Club was established in 1967.

All Saints' Anglican Church was dedicated on 1 November 1980 by Bishop Administror Ralph Wicks. It was conscrecrated on 11 November 1984 by Archbishop John Grindrod. Its closure on 22 September 1999 was approved by Assistant Bishop Ron Williams.

The junction of the Pacific and Gold Coast highways was notoriously traffic-clogged but has improved markedly upon completion of the Tugun Bypass in June 2008.

== Demographics ==
In the 2011 census, Tugun recorded a population of 5,976 people, 51.1% female and 48.9% male. The median age of the Tugun population was 39 years, 2 years above the national median of 37. 76.1% of people living in Tugun were born in Australia. The other top responses for country of birth were New Zealand 5.3%, England 4%, Scotland 0.6%, Japan 0.6%, Canada 0.5%. 89.5% of people spoke only English at home; the next most common languages were 0.7% Japanese, 0.5% Portuguese, 0.4% Italian, 0.4% Mandarin, 0.3% Spanish.

In the 2016 census, Tugun had a population of 6,588 people.

In the 2021 census, Tugun had a population of 7,175 people.

== Heritage listings ==
There are a number of heritage sites in Tugun, including:

- 16 San Michele Street: Ar Dee (beach house)
- Toolona Street (corner Golden Four Drive): Tugun Hotel Moreton Bay Fig Tree

== Education ==
There are no schools in Tugun. The nearest government primary school is Currumbin State School in neighbouring Currumbin to the north. The nearest government secondary school is Palm Beach Currumbin State High School in Palm Beach to the north.

== Facilities ==
John Flynn Private Hospital is at 42 Inland Drive (28.1539°S 153.4882°E). It provides acute cardiac care in addition to general medical and surgical services.

== Amenities ==
The Gold Coast City Council operated a fortnightly mobile library service which visited Station Street and Toolona Street, but this was paused indefinitely due to the COVID-19 pandemic.

St Monica's Catholic Church is at 485 Golden Four Drive (28.1415°S 153.4929°E).

The Living Template Church (formerly Tugun Baptist Church) is at 24 Toolona Street (28.1448°S 153.4930°E).

Tugun Bowls Club is in Kaleena Street (28.1474°S 153.4932°E). It has three lawn bowling greens with restaurant and bar facilities available to members and visitors.

Tugun Surf Lifesaving Club is on the beachfront at 29 O'Connor Street (28.1419°S 153.4951°E). In addition to patrolling the beach in the warmer months, the club also participates in lifesaving sports events and has bistro and bar facilities.

A number of well-known sporting teams represent the local area, including the Tugun Seahawks, the local rugby league club who play home games at Betty Diamond Complex.

Other amenities in the suburb include the Tugun Tavern.

=== Parks ===
There are a number of parks in the area:

- Admiral Crescent Reserve (28.1532°S 153.4906°E)
- Alex Griffiths Park (28.1377°S 153.4892°E)
- Blamey Park (28.1422°S 153.4862°E)
- Boyd Park (28.1571°S 153.4934°E)
- Golden Four Park (28.1457°S 153.4962°E)
- Honeymoon Tree Park (28.1477°S 153.4957°E)
- Inland Drive Reserve (28.1544°S 153.4900°E)
- Irene Street Reserve (28.1525°S 153.4945°E)
- Kropp Park (28.1377°S 153.4918°E)
- Kurrawong Park (28.1405°S 153.4901°E)
- Littleford Family Park (28.1411°S 153.4856°E)
- Mulberry Parade Reserve (28.1534°S 153.4928°E)
- Rosewater Reserve (28.1537°S 153.4881°E)
- Singh Park (28.1478°S 153.4885°E)
- Starfish Court Parklands (28.1539°S 153.4934°E)
- Toolona Park (28.1455°S 153.4868°E)
- Triton Parade Reserve (28.1547°S 153.4919°E)
- Tugun Hill Conservation Area (28.1482°S 153.4822°E)
- Tugun Park (28.1498°S 153.4990°E)
- Wyberba Street Parklands (28.1422°S 153.4955°E)

== Notable people ==
- Schapelle Corby, convicted drug trafficker, lived in Tugun

== See also ==
- Tugun Bypass
