= Smith Street Motorway =

Motorway in Gold Coast, Queensland, Australia

Smith Street Motorway Queensland

General information
- Type: Freeway
- Length: 5.3 km (3.3 mi)
- Route number(s): State Route 10

Major junctions
- West end: Pacific Motorway, Gaven
- Olsen Avenue, Southport
- East end: Smith Street, Southport

Highway system
- Highways in Australia; National Highway • Freeways in Australia; Highways in Queensland

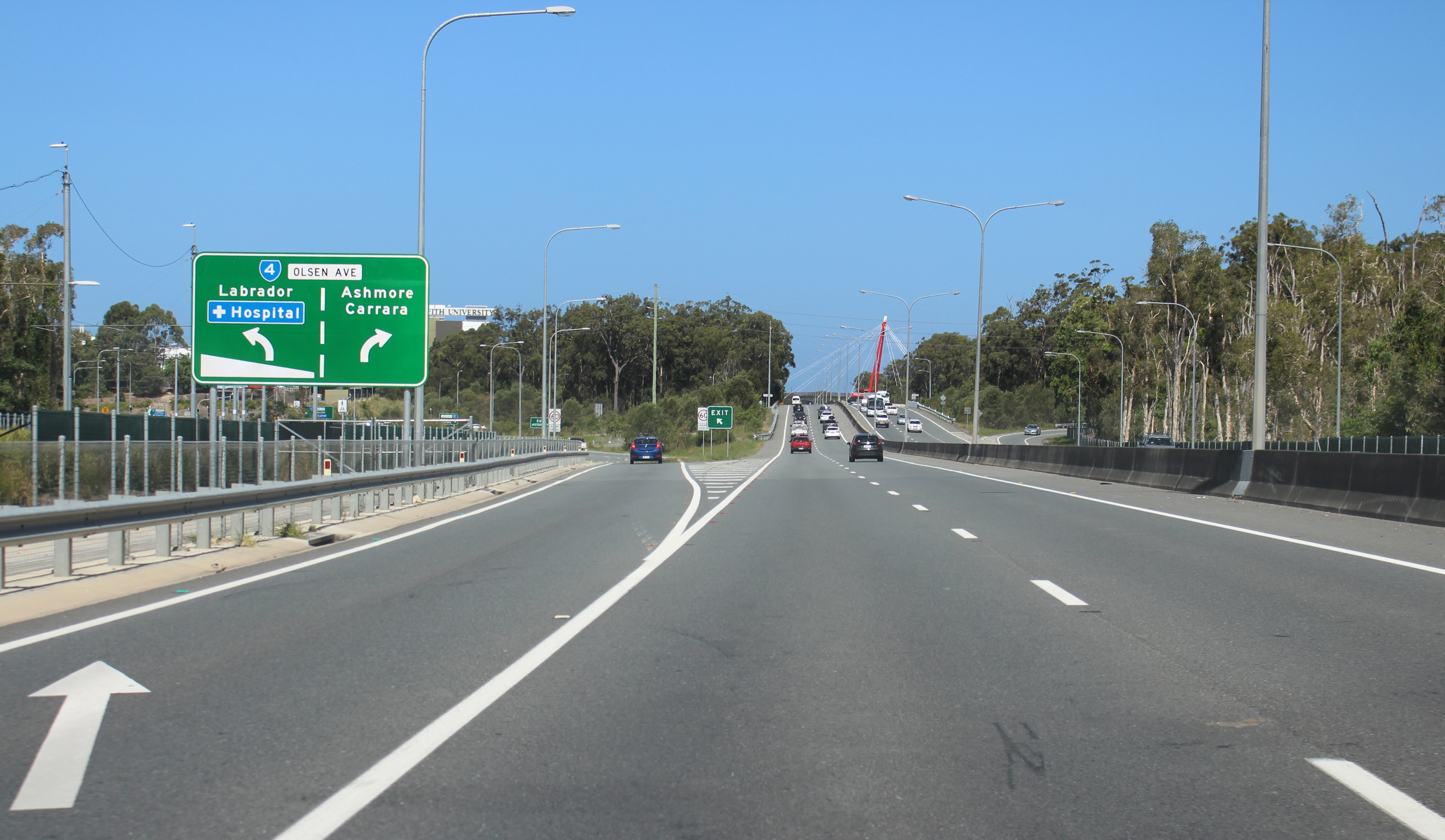
The Smith Street Motorway eastbound at the exit with Olsen Avenue.

Smith Street Motorway (SR10) (or the Smith Street extension) is a motorway grade extension of Smith Street. It connects Southport, the Gold Coast's CBD to the Pacific Motorway.

The road is motorway standard for 5 kilometres (3.1 mi) from the Pacific Motorway (Exit 66) at Gaven, until the Parklands Drive intersection. It then runs as a divided road until High Street in Southport, where it becomes North Street until the Gold Coast Highway. The motorway passes by the city's Health and Knowledge precinct, home to Griffith University, Gold Coast University Hospital and Gold Coast Private Hospital.

A new iconic red bridge for pedestrians across Smith Street Motorway at Southport was completed in early 2007. The red bridge joins the existing parklands campus of Griffith University to the new site on the southern side of the Smith Street Motorway.

The highest point of the motorway is 45 metres at the Smith Street Motorway interchange near the Pacific Motorway at Gaven.

== Interchanges and intersections ==
The entire motorway is in the City of Gold Coast local government area.

Location	km	mi	Destinations	Notes
Gaven	0	0.0	Pacific Motorway (M1) north – Brisbane	Western motorway terminus at partial Y interchange: northbound exit and southbound entrance
Arundel	1	0.62	Smith Street to Pacific Motorway (M1) south, Coolangatta, Gaven	Partial trumpet interchange: no westbound entrance
Molendinar	2	1.2	Precision Drive – Molendinar	Westbound exit and entrance only
Southport	4	2.5	Olsen Avenue (State Route 4) – Labrador, Ashmore, Carrara	Diamond interchange
Southport	5	3.1	Parklands Drive – Griffith University Gold Coast Campus	Traffic light intersection
Southport	5.3	3.3	Smith Street (State Route 10) east / Kumbari Avenue north & south – Southport	Eastern motorway terminus at traffic light intersection
Incomplete access

== See also ==
- Freeways in Australia
- Freeways in Gold Coast
