= Stotts Creek =

Stream in Morgan County, Indiana, U.S.

Coordinates: 39°30′05″N 86°19′59″W

Stotts Creek is a stream in Morgan County, Indiana, in the United States.

Stotts Creek was named for James Stotts, a pioneer who settled there in 1819.

== See also ==
- List of rivers of Indiana
