= Tweed Heads West =

Suburb of Tweed Heads, New South Wales, Australia

- Suburb
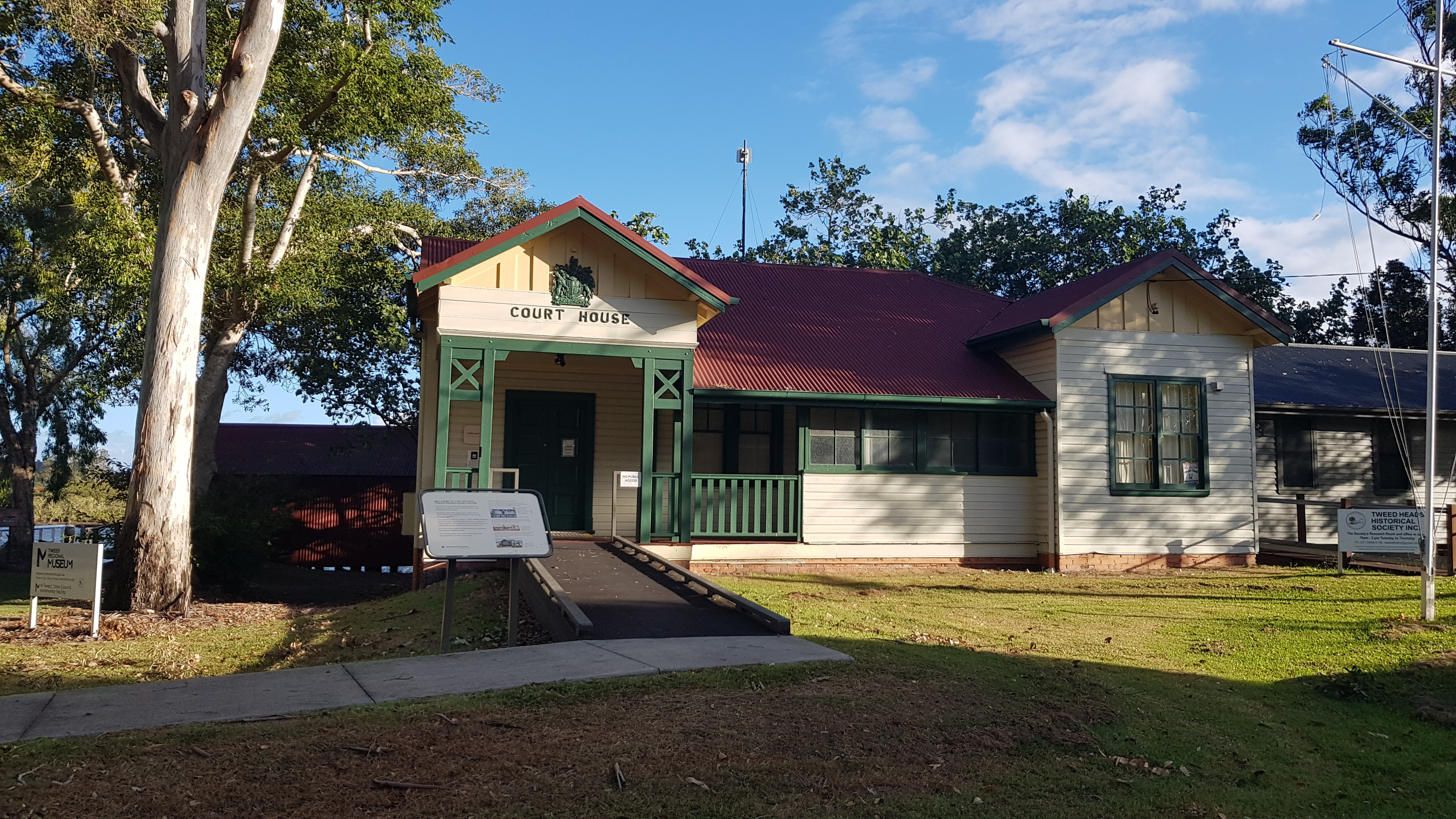
- Tweed Regional Museum, 2023

- Interactive map of Tweed Heads West
- Coordinates: 28°11′13″S 153°30′14″E
- Country: Australia
- State: New South Wales
- City: Tweed Heads
- LGA: Tweed Shire
- Location: 819 km (509 mi) NNE of Sydney; 104 km (65 mi) SSE of Brisbane; 31 km (19 mi) SSE of Surfers Paradise; 65 km (40 mi) N of Byron Bay

Government
  - State electorate: Tweed
  - Federal division: Richmond
- Elevation: 8 m (26 ft)

Population
  - Total: 6,176 (2021 census)
- Time zone: UTC+10 (AEST)
  - Summer (DST): UTC+11 (AEDT)
- Postcode: 2485
Suburbs around Tweed Heads West
Cobaki Lakes	Bilinga (QLD)	Tweed Heads
Cobaki Lakes	Tweed Heads West	Tweed Heads
Bilambil Heights	Tweed Heads South	Tweed Heads South

Tweed Heads West is a suburb of Tweed Heads, located on the Tweed River in north-eastern New South Wales, Australia, in Tweed Shire along the Queensland and New South Wales border.

== History ==
Tweed Heads West is situated in the Bundjalung traditional Aboriginal country.

== Amenities ==
Boyd Family Park is situated on Piggabeen Road, adjacent to Cobaki Creek, with barbecue facility, drinking fountain, picnic setting and shelter.

== Demographics ==
In the 2016 census, Tweed Heads West recorded a population of 6,196 people, 53% female and 47% male.

The median age of the Tweed Heads West population was 48 years, 11 years above the national median of 37.

74.4% of people living in Tweed Heads West were born in Australia. The other top responses for country of birth were England 7.6%, New Zealand 3.5%, Scotland 1%, Germany 0.7%, Philippines 0.5%.

91% of people spoke only English at home; the next most common languages were 0.4% Tagalog, 0.4% German, 0.3% French, 0.3% Thai, 0.2% Spanish.
