= Yelgun, New South Wales =

Yelgun
- Town
- Coordinates: 28°28′48″S 153°29′54″E
- Country: Australia
- State: New South Wales
- LGA: Byron Shire
- Location: 25 km (16 mi) from Byron Bay

Government
  - State electorate: Ballina
  - Federal division: Richmond

Population
  - Total: 88 (SAL 2021)
- Postcode: 2483

Yelgun is a locality in Byron Shire in the Northern Rivers region of New South Wales, Australia. It is located 25.5 kilometres (15.8 mi) north of the regional centre of Byron Bay and is 9.3 kilometres (5.8 mi) from Brunswick Heads.

The traditional owners of this land are the Minjungbal people of the Bundjalung nation.

== Origin of place name ==
The name Yelgun is taken from the Bundjalung language word yalgan which means 'sun' or 'place of the rising sun'; it may also mean 'summer' and 'daytime'. Alternatively it has been suggested the place name is derived from the word yelkin which also means 'sun'.

Archibald James Campbell also recorded that yalgan is the word the Bundjalung people used to refer to the regent bowerbird which are frequently found in the area; this is due to their black and gold plumage.

== History ==
European settlement and colonisation began in the surrounds of Yelgun in the 1840s by foresters, often referred to as cedar-getters. These settlers first called the area 'Dirty Flat' and post World War I there was significant growth of banana farming and the dairy industry which led to lobbying for a railway siding of the Murwillumbah railway line in 1917. When this was first requested there were 22 houses in the region and the locals wanted it, and therefore the locality, to be named 'Bell's Plains'; there was also significant support, for the name 'Willowmead'.

When the railway sideway was completed in 1922 it was named Yelgun by the railway department and the area ultimately took its name.

Also around World War I many Chinese banana farmers moved to Yelgun, and the area more generally, and a local hill became known as Chinamans Hill in the late 1910s. This was likely in honour of the banana farmer Willie (William) War Chan who managed a plantation on behalf of Tiy San & Co. Many of these farmers left in 1925 after a collapse of the banana industry in 1925.

== Current industry ==
In Yelgun farmers grow bananas, mangoes, passionfruit, dragonfruit and papaya. Although in the past there were several dairy farms and the farming of beans, zucchinis.
