= Currumbin Valley, Queensland =

Currumbin Valley Gold Coast City, Queensland
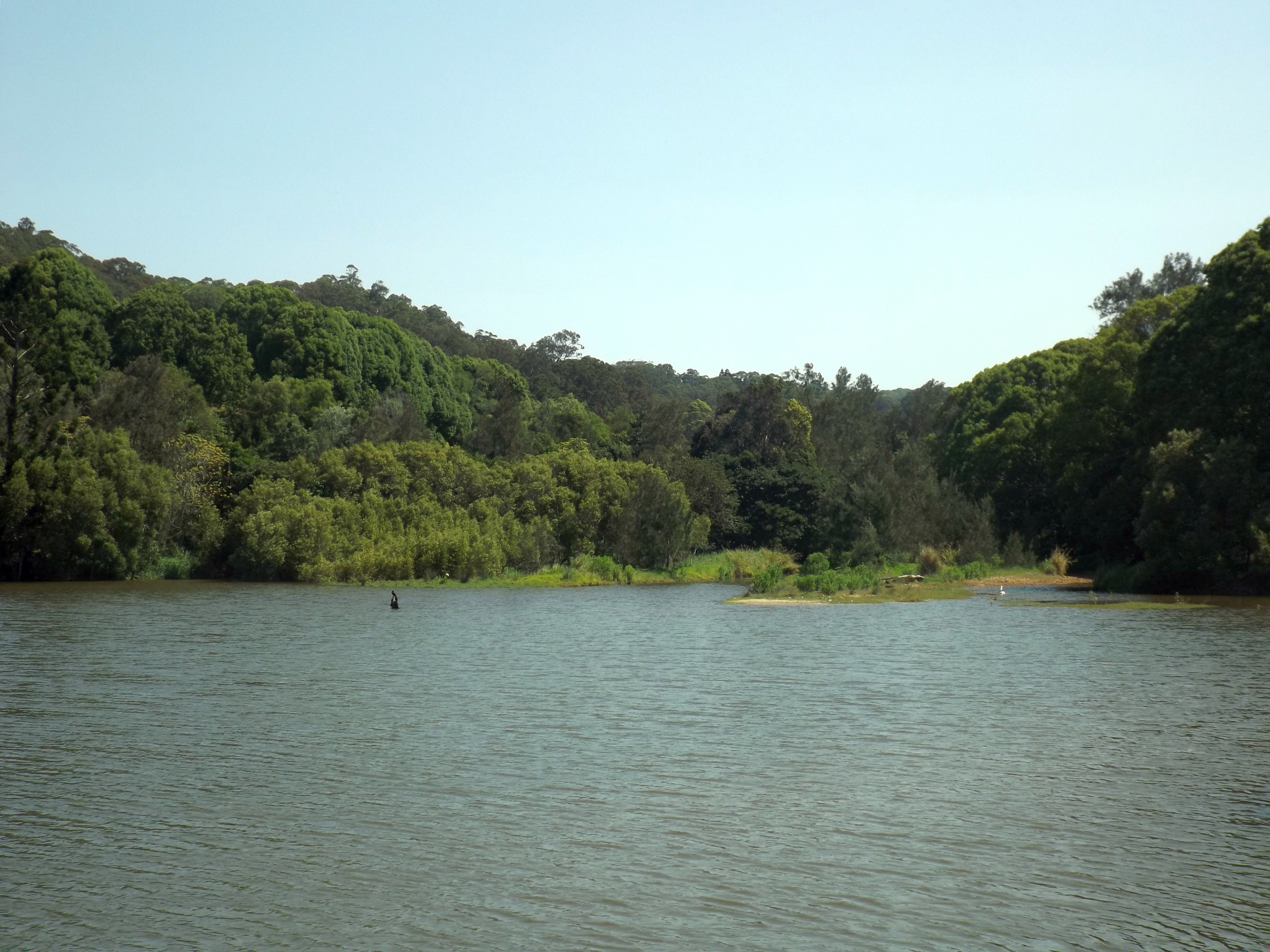
- Currumbin Creek at Robert Neumann Park, 2015

- Coordinates: 28.2016°S 153.4°E
- Population: 2,084 (2021 census)
  - Density: 59.54/km^{2} (154.22/sq mi)
- Postcode(s): 4223
- Elevation: 15 m (49 ft)
- Area: 35.0 km^{2} (13.5 sq mi)
- Time zone: AEST (UTC+10:00)
- Location: 19.0 km (12 mi) W of Coolangatta; 35.3 km (22 mi) S of Surfers Paradise; 39.1 km (24 mi) S of Southport; 101 km (63 mi) SSE of Brisbane
- LGA(s): City of Gold Coast
- State electorate(s): Currumbin
- Federal division(s): McPherson
Suburbs around Currumbin Valley:
Tallebudgera	Elanora	Currumbin Waters
Tallebudgera Valley	Currumbin Valley	Piggabeen (NSW)
Dungay (NSW)	Tomewin (NSW)	Glengarrie (NSW)

Currumbin Valley is a rural locality in the City of Gold Coast, Queensland, Australia. It borders New South Wales. In the 2021 census, Currumbin Valley had a population of 2,084 people.

== Geography ==
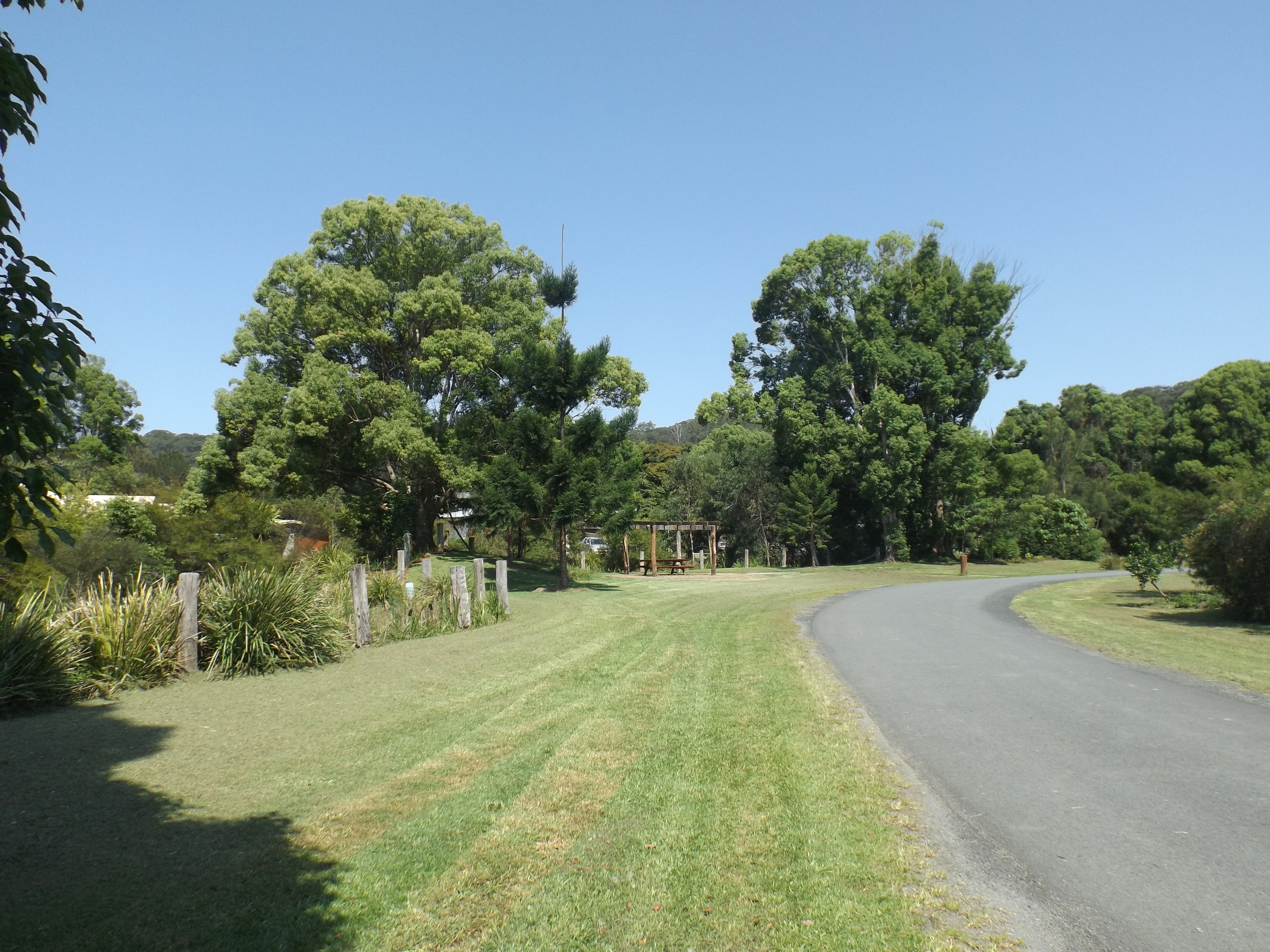
Currumbin Ecovillage, 2015

Currumbin Valley is in the Gold Coast hinterland of South East Queensland bounded to the south by the Queensland border with New South Wales.

The valley is relatively small in size being approximately twenty-four kilometers long and around four kilometers wide. Furthermore, Currumbin Valley provides both rural and residential land but is predominantly rural. Currumbin Valley is a unique part of Australia’s Green Cauldron, being the first valley to the north of the escarpment of the cauldron (the temple of which is Mount Warning) in the Murwillumbah region, to the south.

The main road through Currumbin Valley – Currumbin Creek Road extends 20 kilometres west to the Mt Cougal Section of the Springbrook National Park, where it terminates, with a World-Heritage-Listed rainforest walk, the Cougal Cascades (waterfalls) and abundant, native flora and fauna. This pristine rainforest is part of the eastern section of the Gondwana Rainforests of Australia.

== History ==
The Currumbin Valley was predominantly used for timber getting and grazing – the settlement date of this area dates from the 1840s.

In the 1870s and 1880s many banana plantations, sugar crops and dairy farms were established. This therefore enabled the minimal population to grow.

Again some growth took place during the early 1900s, following the construction of the railway line.

Currumbin Upper Provisional School opened on 21 September 1908. On 1 January 1909, it became Currumbin State School. Between 1922 and 1923, the school closed due to low student numbers. On 16 June 1966, the school was renamed Currumbin Valley State School.

In December 1926, it was decided to build a Presbyterian church. John Boyd donated the land and Alexander Mayes, a retired builder, drew up the plans and supervised the work. The Upper Currumbin Presbyterian Church was officially opened on Saturday 23 April 1927 by Reverend William Herman Waters, Moderator of the Presbyterian Church in Queensland. When the Presbyterian Church amalgamated into the Uniting Church in Australia in 1977, it became Currumbin Valley Uniting Church, later Currumbin Valley Community Church.

Significant development occurred from the 1970s.

However, significant growth took place during the 1990s, a result of new dwellings being added to the area.

Growth slowed between 2001 and 2011 as fewer new dwellings were added.

== Demographics ==
In the 2016 census, Currumbin Valley had a population of 1,849 people.

In the 2021 census, Currumbin Valley had a population of 2,084 people.

== Education ==
Currumbin Valley State School is a government primary (Preparatory to Year 6) school for boys and girls at 1223 Currumbin Creek Road (28.2064°S 153.3943°E). In 2018, the school had an enrolment of 171 students with 17 teachers (10 full-time equivalent) and 8 non-teaching staff (5 full-time equivalent).

There are no secondary schools in Currumbin Valley. The nearest government secondary school is Elanora State High School in neighbouring Elanora to the north.

== Amenities ==
The Gold Coast City Council operates a fortnightly mobile library service which visits Currumbin Valley State School on Currumbin Creek Road.

Currumbin Valley Uniting Church is at 1326 Currumbin Creek Road (28.2121°S 153.3881°E).

== Attractions ==
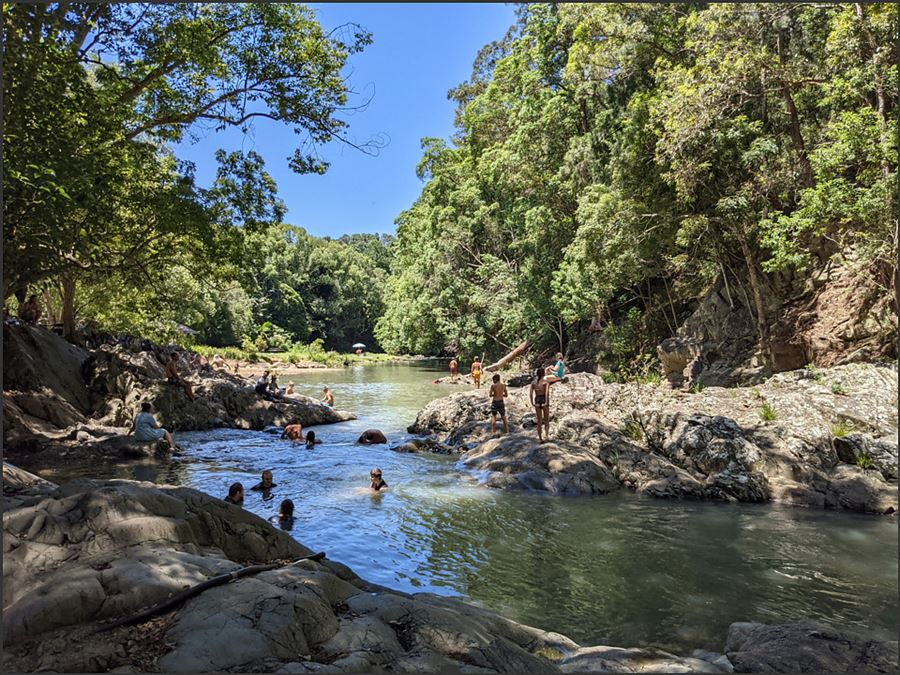
Currumbin Rock Pools, 2022

The Currumbin Valley Rock Pool is located 12 km inland from Currumbin beach, and is a popular attraction for locals. Springbrook also offers a number of walking trails around the rainforest. Information about the walking trails around the Springbrook National Park can be found at the Rangers offices in Natural Bridge or Springbrook. Nicoll Scrub National Park is a protected area in Queensland, 88 km southeast of Brisbane. It adjoins the Currumbin Valley Reserve and protects remnant rainforest vegetation.
