= Currumbin Waters, Queensland =

Currumbin Waters
- Suburb
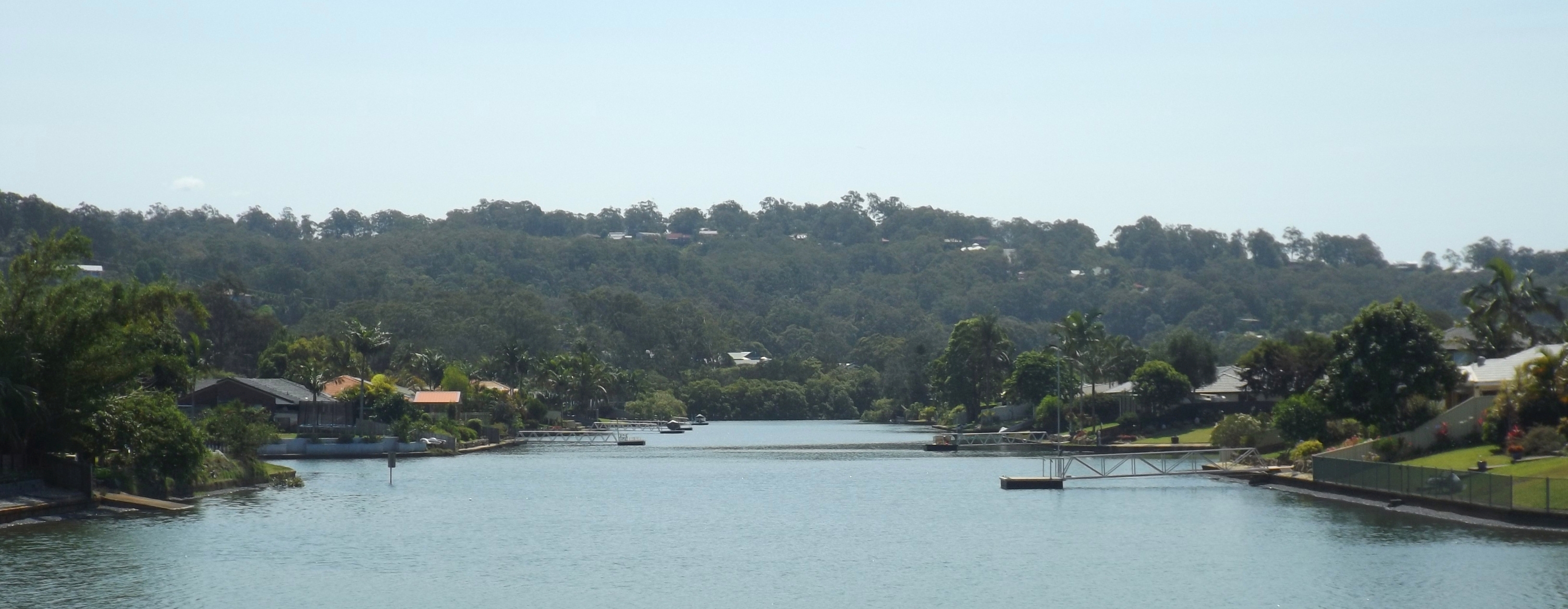
- Currumbin Creek canals in 2015

- Interactive map of Currumbin Waters
- Coordinates: 28.1575°S 153.4686°E
- Country: Australia
- State: Queensland
- City: Gold Coast City
- LGA: City of Gold Coast
- Location: 10.2 km (6.3 mi) NNW of Coolangatta; 24.2 km (15.0 mi) S of Surfers Paradise; 26.8 km (16.7 mi) S of Southport; 96.3 km (59.8 mi) SSE of Brisbane

Government
  - State electorate: Currumbin
  - Federal division: McPherson

Area
  - Total: 9.9 km^{2} (3.8 sq mi)
- Elevation: 4 m (13 ft)

Population
  - Total: 9,797 (2021 census)
  - Density: 990/km^{2} (2,563/sq mi)
- Time zone: UTC+10:00 (AEST)
- Postcode: 4223
Suburbs around Currumbin Waters
Elanora	Elanora	Palm Beach; Currumbin
Elanora	Currumbin Waters	Tugun
Currumbin Valley	Cobaki Lakes (NSW)	Cobaki Lakes (NSW)

Currumbin Waters is a suburb in the City of Gold Coast, Queensland, Australia. It borders New South Wales. In the 2021 census, Currumbin Waters had a population of 9,797 people.

== Geography ==
Currumbin Waters is bounded to the south by the Queensland border with New South Wales, to the east by the Pacific Motorway, to the north by Guineas Creek Road, and to the west by Simpsons Road and Piggabeen Road.

Currumbin Creek flows through the suburb from the south-west (Currumbin Valley) towards the north (Palm Beach and Currumbin) where it enters the Coral Sea.

Currumbin Waters has a variety of land uses. North of the creek is residential. South of the creek there is an industrial estate in the north-east of the suburb (28.1468°S 153.4711°E). There is a residential canal estate in the centre of the suburb (28.1528°S 153.4657°E) with normal residential use in the east. In the south-east of the locality the land is used for farming, mostly grazing on native vegetation (28.1672°S 153.4576°E).

== History ==
The name Currumbin Waters was originally a real estate development name. The name Currumbin is from the Bundjalung language (Ngaraangbal dialect), which means either high or high trees or may be a corruption of kurrohmin meaning kangaroo.

St Augustine's Catholic School was established in 1926 by the Daughters of Our Lady of the Sacred Heart in Coolangatta. From 1950, the school was operated by Missionary Franciscan Sisters of the Immaculate Conception. On 27 January 1987, the school relocated to a new site in Currumbin Waters. In 1992, the sisters ended their association with the school which is now under lay administration.

Coolangatta Special School opened on 1 January 1979 in Coolangatta. On 1 July 2006, the school was relocated to Currumbin Waters and renamed Currumbin Community Special School.

== Demographics ==
In the 2011 census, Currumbin Waters had a population of 8,883, 51.8% female and 48.2% male. The median age of the Currumbin Waters population was 42 years, 5 years above the national median of 37. 76.7% of people living in Currumbin Waters were born in Australia. The other top responses for country of birth were England 5.3%, New Zealand 4.8%, Germany 0.7%, Scotland 0.6%, South Africa 0.5%. 91% of people spoke only English at home; the next most common languages were 0.5% German, 0.5% Japanese, 0.2% Tagalog, 0.2% Portuguese, 0.2% Italian.

In the 2016 census, Currumbin Waters had a population of 9,121 people.

In the 2021 census, Currumbin Waters had a population of 9,797 people.

== Education ==
St Augustine's Parish Primary School is a Catholic primary (Preparatory to Year 6) school for boys and girls at Galleon Way (28.1502°S 153.4594°E). In 2017, the school had an enrolment of 463 students with 32 teachers (25 full-time equivalent) and 17 non-teaching staff (10 full-time equivalent).

Currumbin Community Special School is a special government primary and secondary (Preparatory to Year 12) school for boys and girls at 5 Hammersford Drive (28.1519°S 153.4725°E). In 2017, the school had an enrolment of 87 students with 31 teachers (24 full-time equivalent) and 28 non-teaching staff (19 full-time equivalent).

There are no mainstream government primary nor secondary schools in Currumbin Waters. The nearest government primary schools are Elanora State School in neighbouring Elanora to the north and Currumbin State School in neighbouring Currumbin to the north-east. The nearest government secondary schools are Elanora State High School in Elanora and Palm Beach-Currumbin State High School in neighbouring Palm Beach to the north-east.

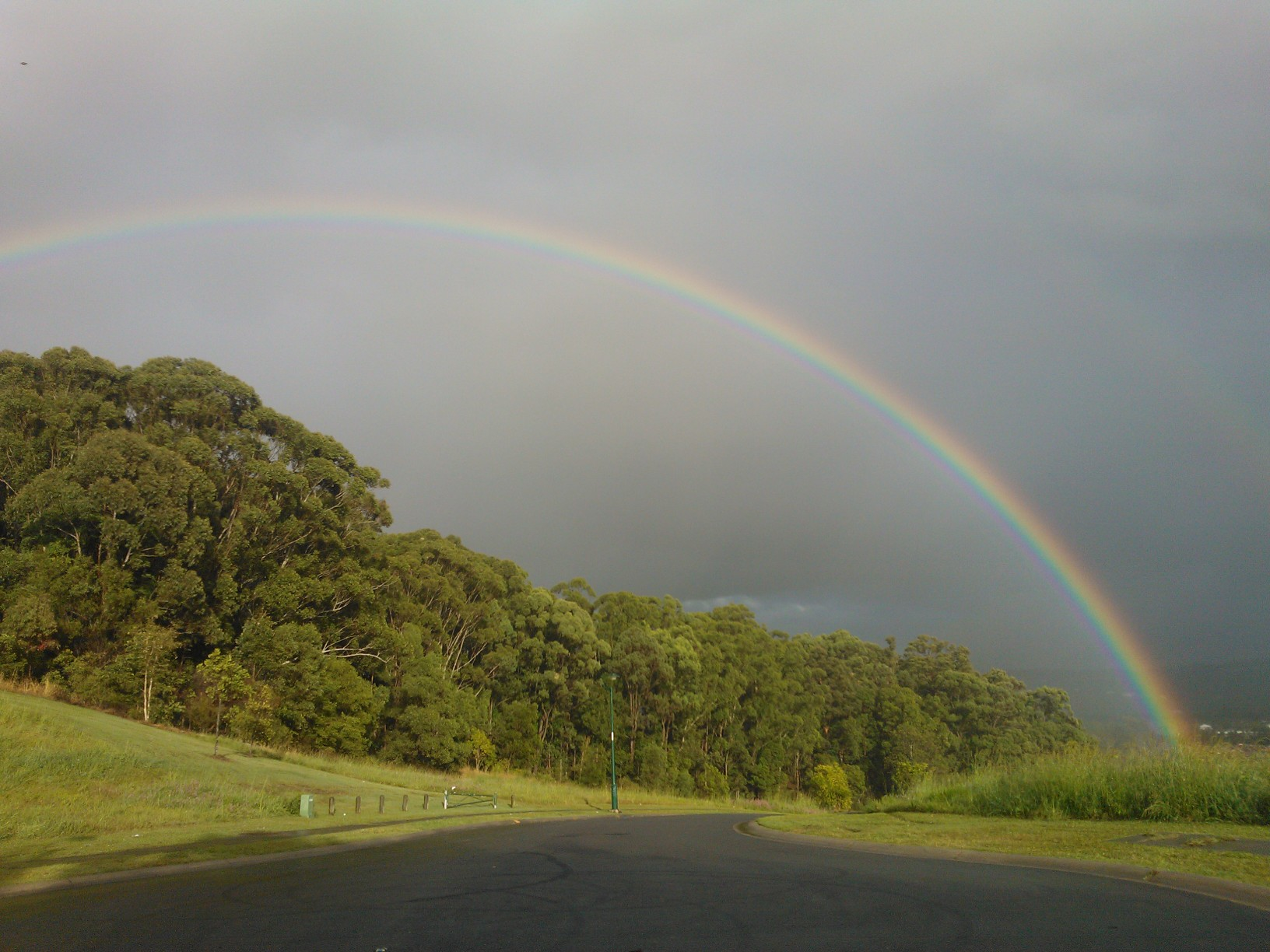
Border Drive, 2013
