= Palm Beach, Queensland =

Palm Beach
- Suburb
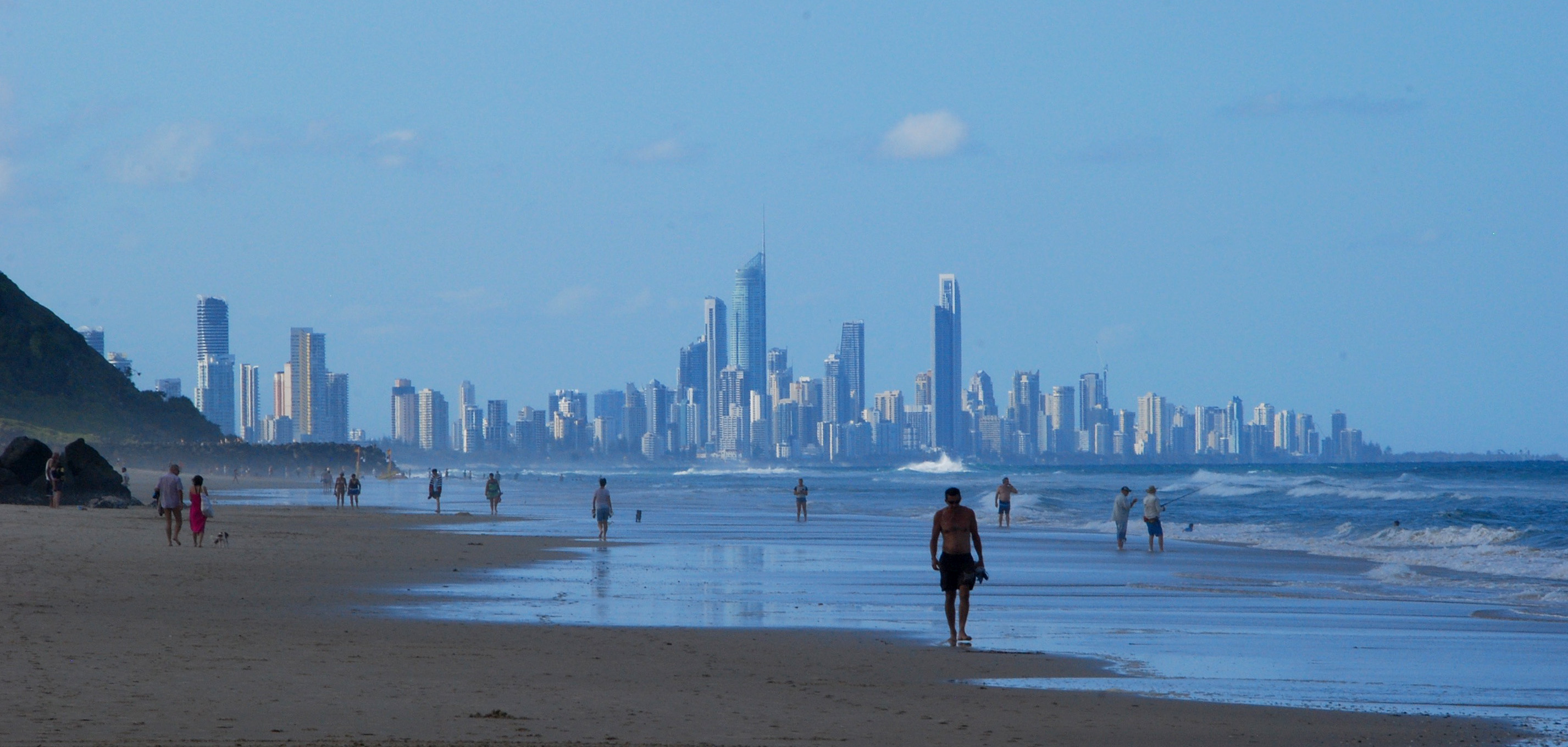
- View of Palm Beach, with Gold Coast in the background

- Interactive map of Palm Beach
- Coordinates: 28.1169°S 153.4658°E
- Country: Australia
- State: Queensland
- City: Gold Coast
- LGA: City of Gold Coast
- Location: 19.2 km (11.9 mi) S of Surfers Paradise; 92.2 km (57.3 mi) SSE of Brisbane; 12 km (7.5 mi) NW of Tweed Heads

Government
  - State electorate: Burleigh
  - Federal division: McPherson

Area
  - Total: 6.3 km^{2} (2.4 sq mi)
- Elevation: 6 m (20 ft)

Population
  - Total: 16,349 (2021 census)
  - Density: 2,595/km^{2} (6,720/sq mi)
- Time zone: UTC+10:00 (AEST)
- Postcode: 4221
Suburbs around Palm Beach
Burleigh Heads	Coral Sea	Coral Sea
Elanora	Palm Beach	Coral Sea
Elanora	Currumbin Waters	Currumbin

The shoreline at Palm Beach looking north to Burleigh National Park and Surfers Paradise

Palm Beach is a coastal suburb in the City of Gold Coast, Queensland, Australia. In the 2021 census, Palm Beach had a population of 16,349 people.

== Geography ==
Palm Beach is bounded to the north by Tallebudgera Creek, to the east by the Coral Sea, to the south by Currumbin Creek, and to the west by the Pacific Motorway.

The entrance to Tallebudgera Creek is stabilised by a southern training wall, which was established between 1976 and 1981. A seawall between Currumbin Rock and the creek's mouth was constructed in 1973 and 1978. In 1981, a rock wall was constructed on the Palm Beach side of the creek. Both creeks have also been managed through regular dredging, with material dredged from Currumbin Creek used for beach nourishment at Palm Beach.

In 2019, the City of Gold Coast completed the Palm Beach Shoreline Project, which combined beach nourishment with an artificial reef designed to improve coastal protection and surfing amenity.

== History ==
Palm Beach Baptist Church opened on Saturday 8 December 1928. It was the first church opened in Palm Beach. It was on Ninth Avenue. In 1969 the original building was demolished and replaced with a brick building. In 2000 the Palm Beach site was sold and the congregation built the Reedy Creek Baptist Church at 10 Gemvale Road, Reedy Creek.

Palm Beach Surf Club was established in 1930.

Palm Beach-Currumbin State High School opened on 24 January 1972.

Palm Beach State School opened on 4 February 1974.

The Palm Beach Library opened in 1998 and had a major refurbishment in 2011. The library closed down in early 2021 and was replaced with a library kiosk.

Palm Beach was judged Queensland's Cleanest Beach in 1999 and again in 2000 and 2011 by the Keep Australia Beautiful Council.

== Demographics ==
In the 2016 census, Palm Beach had a population of 14,654 people.

In the 2021 census, Palm Beach had a population of 16,349 people.

== Heritage listings ==
Palm Beach has a heritage site:

- former Currumbin Creek Railway Bridge on the South Coast railway line, Currumbin Creek (28.1367°S 153.4723°E)

== Education ==
Palm Beach State School is a government primary (Preparatory to Year 6) school for boys and girls at 13-19 Nineteenth Avenue (28.1107°S 153.4631°E). In 2017, the school had an enrolment of 511 students with 37 teachers (33 full-time equivalent) and 21 non-teaching staff (12 full-time equivalent). It includes a special education program.

Students in southern Palm Beach can attend Currumbin State School in Currumbin.

Palm Beach Currumbin State High School is a government secondary (7–12) school for boys and girls at Thrower Drive (28.1316°S 153.4742°E). In 2017, the school had an enrolment of 2457 students with 179 teachers (173 full-time equivalent) and 87 non-teaching staff (70 full-time equivalent). It includes a special education program.

Students in western Palm Beach can attend Elanora State High School in Elanora.

Tallebudgera Outdoor and Environmental Education Centre is an Outdoor and Environmental Education Centre at 1525 Gold Coast Highway (28.0985°S 153.4586°E).

== Amenities ==
The Gold Coast City Council operates a small library kiosk on Eleventh Avenue. In the same building is the office of Division 13 Councillor, Cr Josh Martin (as at 2024).

Palm Beach Surf Club at 117 Jefferson Lane provides surf lifesaving services and clubhouse dining facilities. Established in 1930, there has never been a fatality in its flagged beach zones.

Our Lady of the Way Church is at 14 Eleventh Avenue (28.1166°S 153.4689°E). It is part of the Burleigh Heads Catholic Parish within the Archdiocese of Brisbane.

== Transport ==
Roads

The Gold Coast Highway runs through the eastern section of the suburb, past the main shopping centre and restaurants (Eighth Avenue to Fourth Avenue), with the Pacific Motorway on the western side. Palm Beach Avenue connects the Gold Coast Highway to the Motorway and the neighbouring suburb of Elanora. 19th Avenue also continues into Elanora past Palm Beach State School, 19th Avenue Shopping Centre, and into Guineas Creek Road.

Public transport

Translink routes 700, 765 and 777 serve Palm Beach. Route 700 operates between Tweed Heads and Broadbeach South station. Route 765 operates between The Pines Elanora and Robina Town Centre. Route 777 operates between the Gold Coast Airport and Broadbeach South station.

Gold Coast Light Rail Stage 3 is a 6.7-kilometre extension from Broadbeach South to Burleigh Heads. As of July 2026, testing and commissioning were underway across the full alignment.

Planning for Stage 4, which would have extended the light rail network from Burleigh Heads to Coolangatta via Gold Coast Airport, was stopped by the Queensland Government on 1 September 2025.

== Sports and recreation ==
Neptune Royal Life Saving Club began patrolling Tallebudgera Creek in 1959. After opening its clubhouse in 1961, it became the world’s first all-female Royal Life Saving club to conduct regular patrols and have a permanent clubhouse. The club continues to patrol the creek during weekends and public holidays in its patrol season.

The beach at Palm Beach is patrolled by three surf lifesaving clubs. Tallebudgera Surf Life Saving Club patrols the northern section near Tallebudgera Creek, Pacific Surf Life Saving Club patrols the central section, and Palm Beach Surf Life Saving Club patrols the southern section. Palm Beach Surf Life Saving Club was established in 1930, and is located near Seventh Avenue and Jefferson Lane.

Salk Oval on Sarawak Avenue contains sports fields used for Australian rules football, cricket and athletics. The Palm Beach Currumbin Australian Football Club and Palm Beach Currumbin Cricket Club are among the sporting clubs associated with the site.

Mallawa Sports Complex on Nineteenth Avenue contains several sports fields, cricket pitches and netball courts. Sports and activities at the complex include cricket, netball, soccer and touch football. Palm Beach Soccer Club, Palm Beach Netball Club and Palm Beach Touch Association are among the organisations associated with the complex.

Palm Beach Aquatic Centre on Thrower Drive has four heated swimming pools, including 50-metre and 25-metre outdoor pools, as well as a fitness centre.

== See also ==
- List of Gold Coast suburbs
