= Little Nerang Dam =

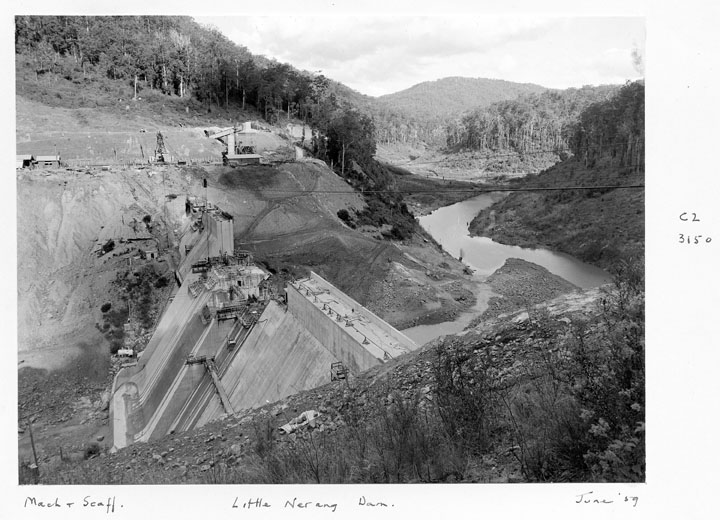
- Construction of dam, in 1959

- Location of the dam in Queensland
- Interactive map of Little Nerang Dam
- Country: Australia
- Location: South East Queensland
- Coordinates: 28°08′37″S 153°17′08″E
- Purpose: Potable water supply
- Status: Operational
- Opening date: 1962
- Operator: SEQ Water

Dam and spillways
- Type of dam: Gravity dam
- Impounds: Little Nerang Creek
- Height: 44 m (144 ft)
- Length: 201 m (659 ft)
- Dam volume: 68×10^{3} m^{3} (2.4×10^{6} cu ft)
- Spillway type: Uncontrolled
- Spillway capacity: 570 m^{3}/s (20,000 cu ft/s)

Reservoir
- Total capacity: 6,705 ML (5,436 acre⋅ft)
- Catchment area: 35.2 km^{2} (13.6 sq mi)
- Surface area: 49 ha (120 acres)
- Normal elevation: 166 m (545 ft) AHD
- Website seqwater.com.au

The Little Nerang Dam is a concrete gravity dam across the Little Nerang Creek, in the South East region of Queensland, Australia. The main purpose of the dam is for potable water supply of the Gold Coast region.

The impounded reservoir is also called Little Nerang Dam. The reservoir was closed to the public in 2013 due to safety concerns.

== Location and features ==
The dam is located 9 kilometres (5.6 mi) west of Tugun and 25 kilometres (16 mi) driving distance from Mudgeeraba, and is located directly upstream from the Hinze Dam. Prior to the completion of the Hinze Dam, the Little Nerang Creek Gravity Scheme supplied the water requirements of the Gold Coast area. Water flows by gravity pipeline to the Mudgeeraba Water Treatment Plant. The plant, completed in 1969, has the capacity to treat 110 megalitres (89 acre⋅ft) a day. The water then flows by gravity to the city's storage reservoirs.

Completed in 1962, the rock- and earth-fill structure is 44 metres (144 ft) high and 201 metres (659 ft) long. The 68-thousand-cubic-metre (2.4×10^{6} cu ft) dam wall holds back the 8,390-megalitre (6,800 acre⋅ft) reservoir when at full capacity. From a catchment area of 35 square kilometres (14 sq mi) that includes the Springbrook Plateau, the dam creates an unnamed reservoir with a surface area of 50 hectares (120 acres). The un-gated spillway has a discharge capacity of 570 cubic metres per second (20,000 cu ft/s).

Initially managed by Gold Coast Water, management of the dam was transferred to SEQ Water in July 2008.

== Recreational ==
Recreation is not permitted at Little Nerang Dam. As of 2017, access to Little Nerang Dam and Little Nerang Dam Road is restricted to SEQ Water employees and residents of the road, with a large security gate that blocks access.

== Gallery ==
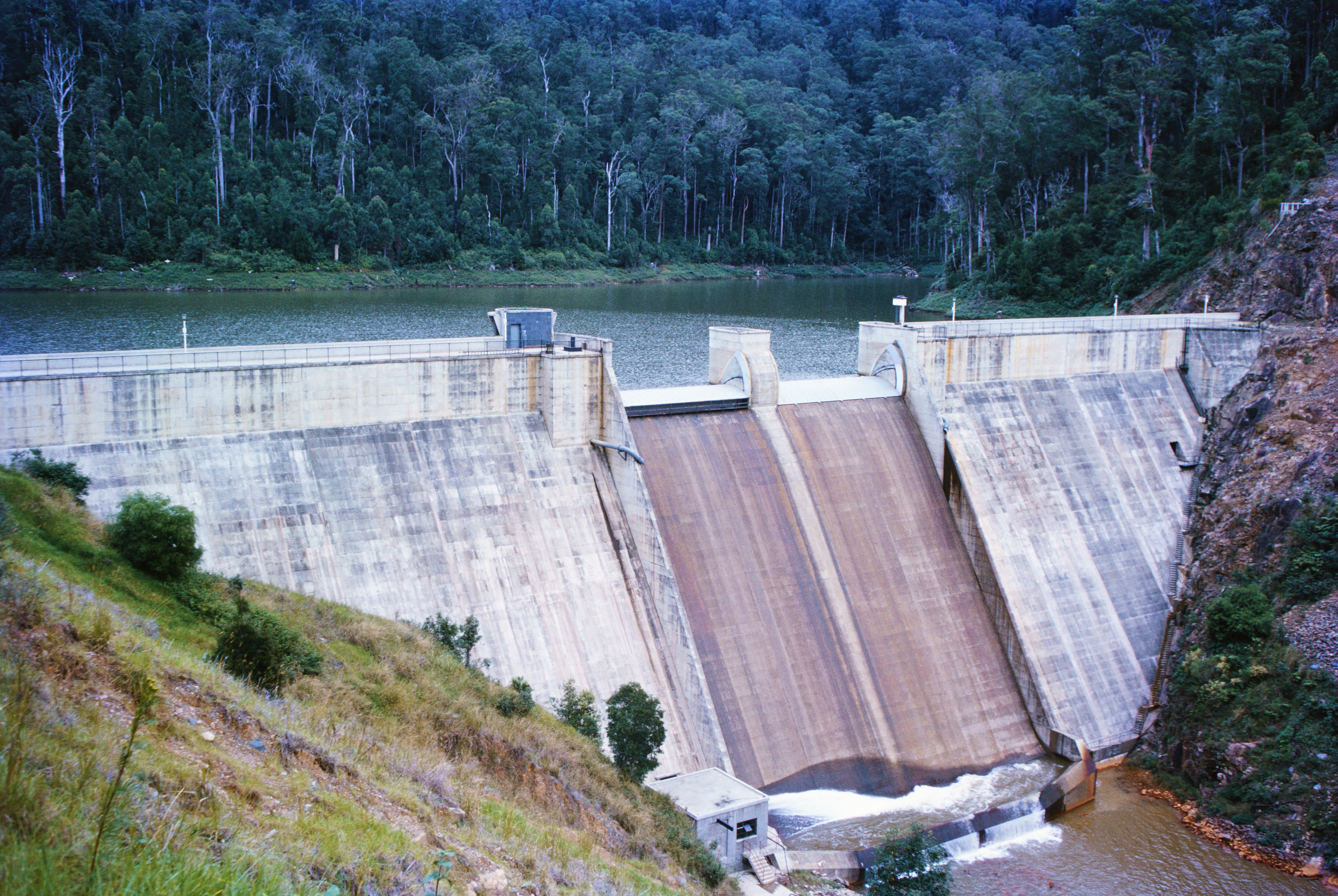
The dam wall and spillway, 1964

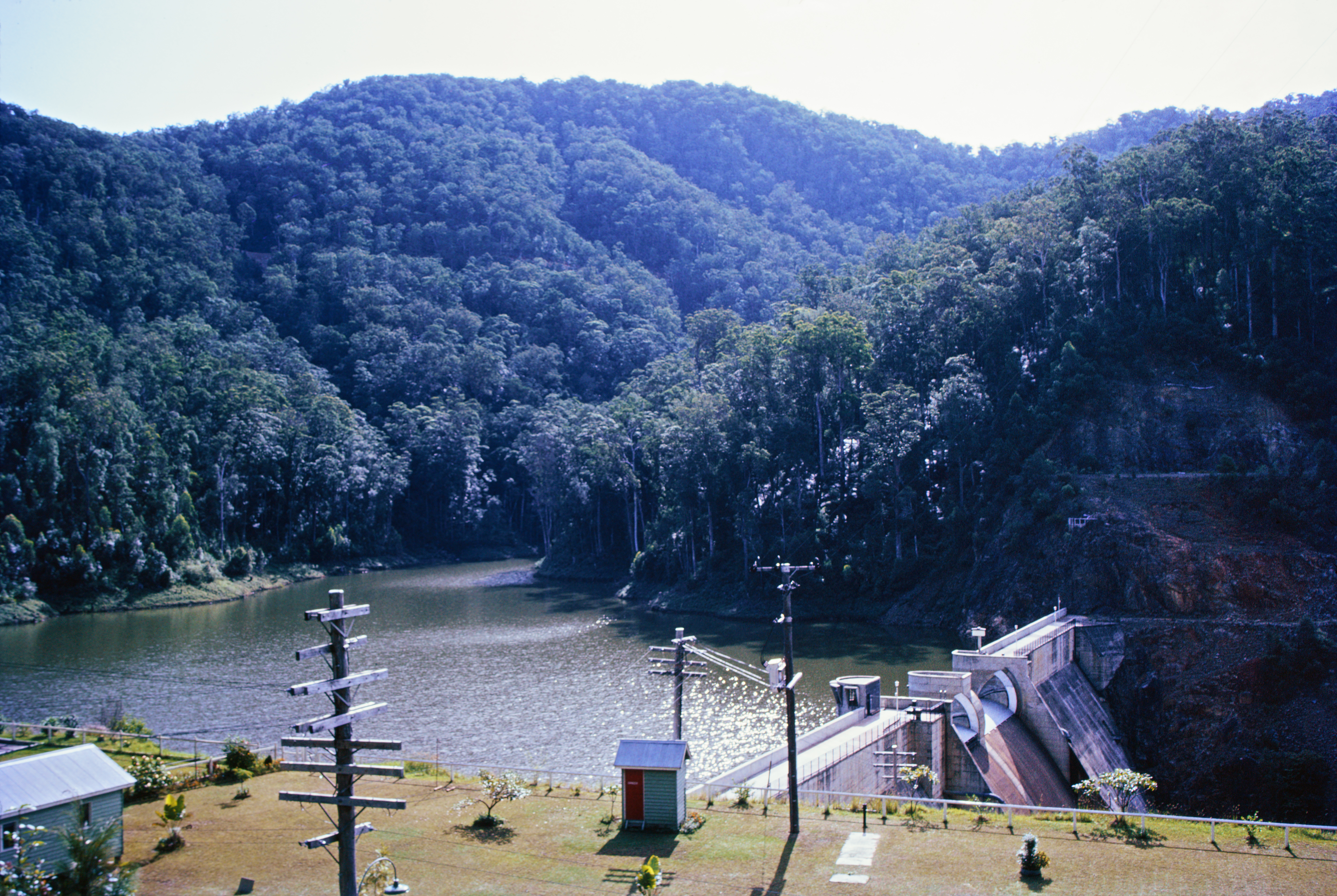
Aerial view of the dam, 1964

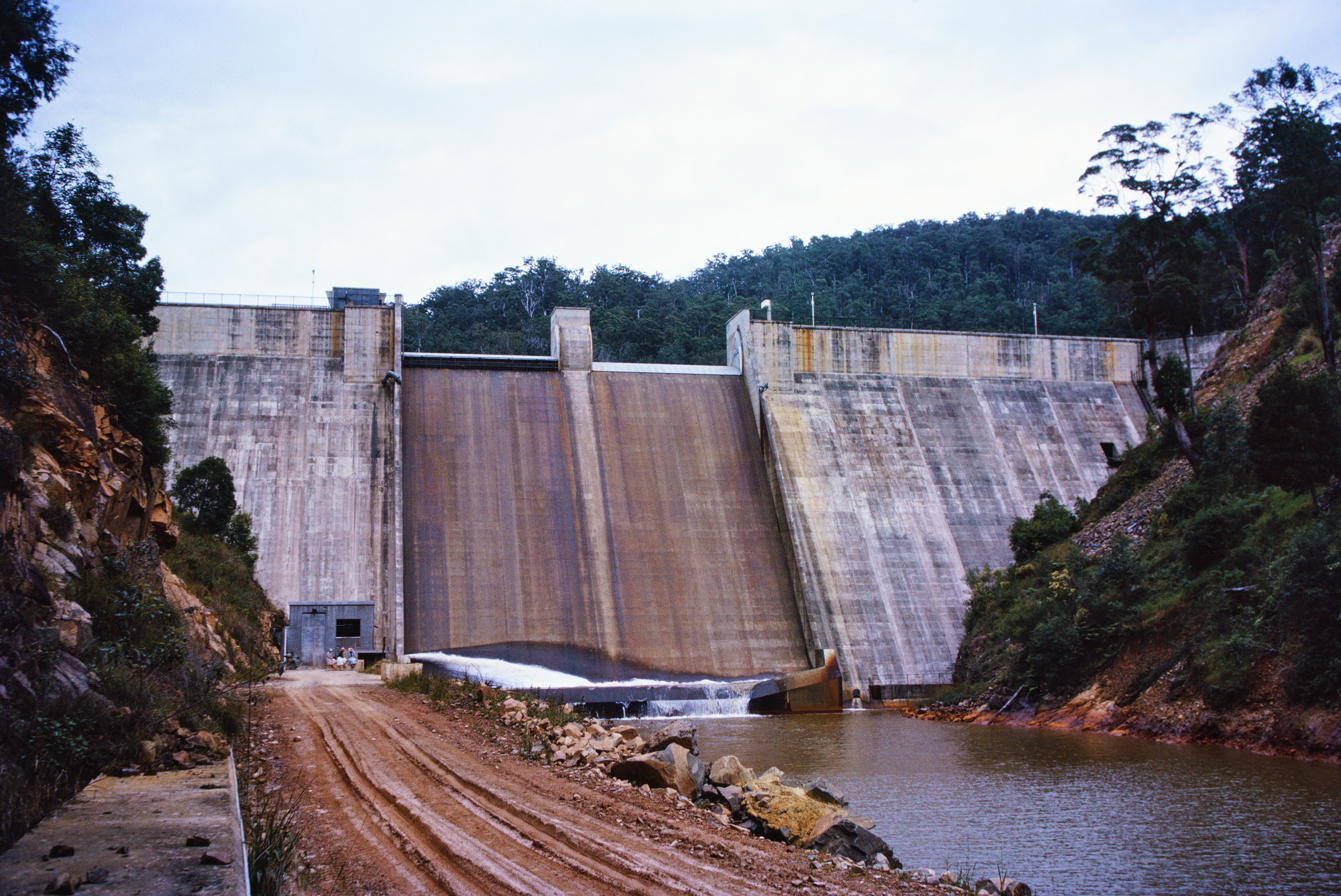
Spillway and dam wall, 1964

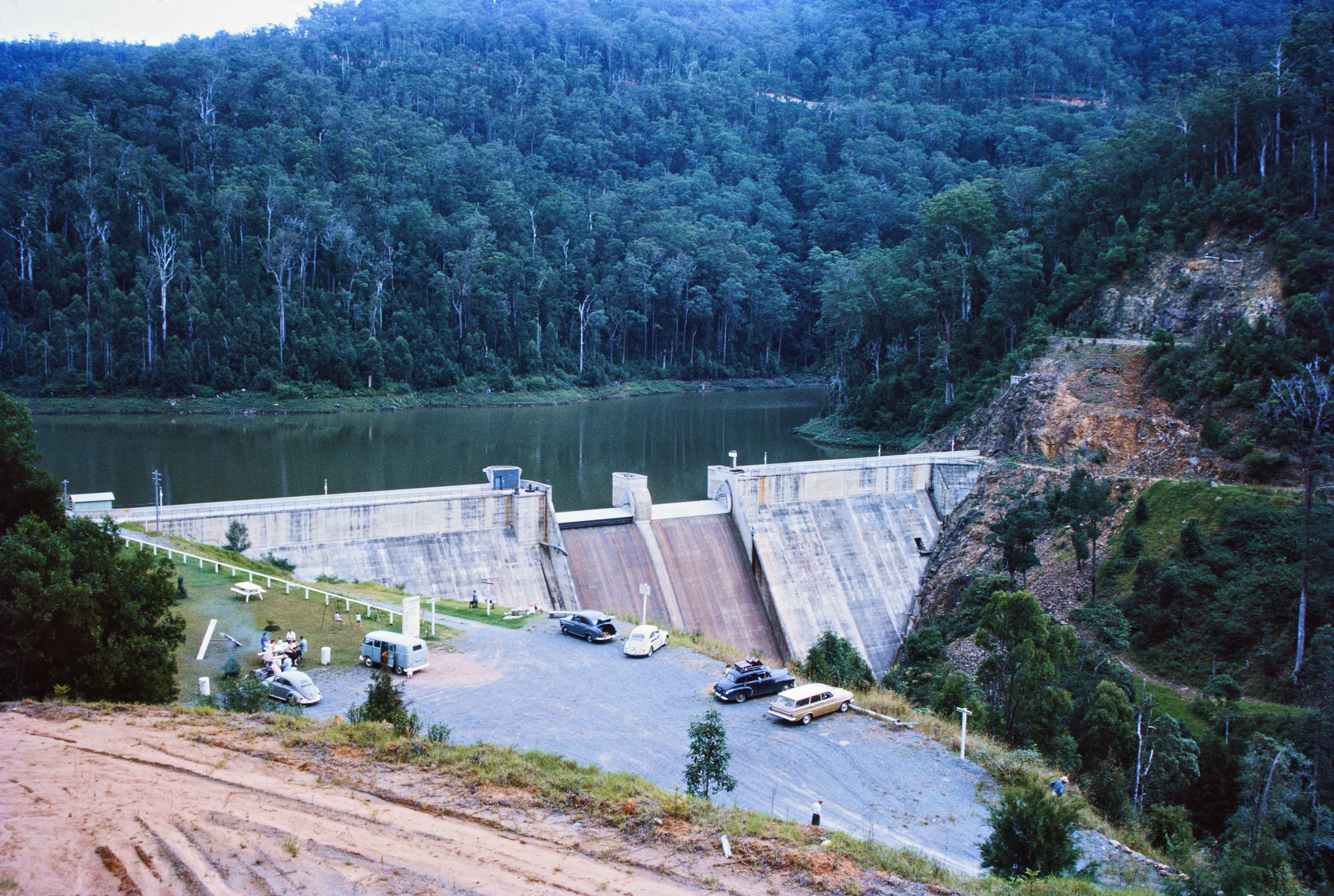
Looking down on the picnic ground, carpark and dam wall, 1964

== See also ==
- List of dams in Queensland
- Gold Coast Water
