= Currumbin Valley Reserve =

Australian nature reserve

Coordinates: 28°11′25.51″S 153°25′33.31″E

Currumbin Valley Reserve is a 4 ha nature reserve in the Gold Coast hinterland of south-east Queensland, Australia, west of Coolangatta, 105 kilometres (65 mi) south of Brisbane. It is owned and managed by Bush Heritage Australia (BHA), to which it was donated in 1999 by the Wildlife Preservation Society of Queensland according to the wishes of the previous owner, Dr Alex Griffiths, founder of the Currumbin Wildlife Sanctuary. With the adjacent Nicoll Scrub National Park it forms the only large area of rainforest remaining in the lower Currumbin Valley. Is a tiny patch of regenerating rainforest protected from the nearby frenzy of development.

Altitude Currumbin Valley Reserve varies from 20 to 620 meters at the highest points.

== Vegetation ==
The reserve contains remnant rainforest in a rapidly developing region where much has already been cleared. The lack of emergent canopy species indicates that the reserve was logged previously and the rainforest is of a regenerating transitional type known as Relict Myrtaceous Emergent Vine Forest.

== See also ==
- Currumbin Ecovillage
