= Alexander Mayes (cricketer) =

Australian cricketer

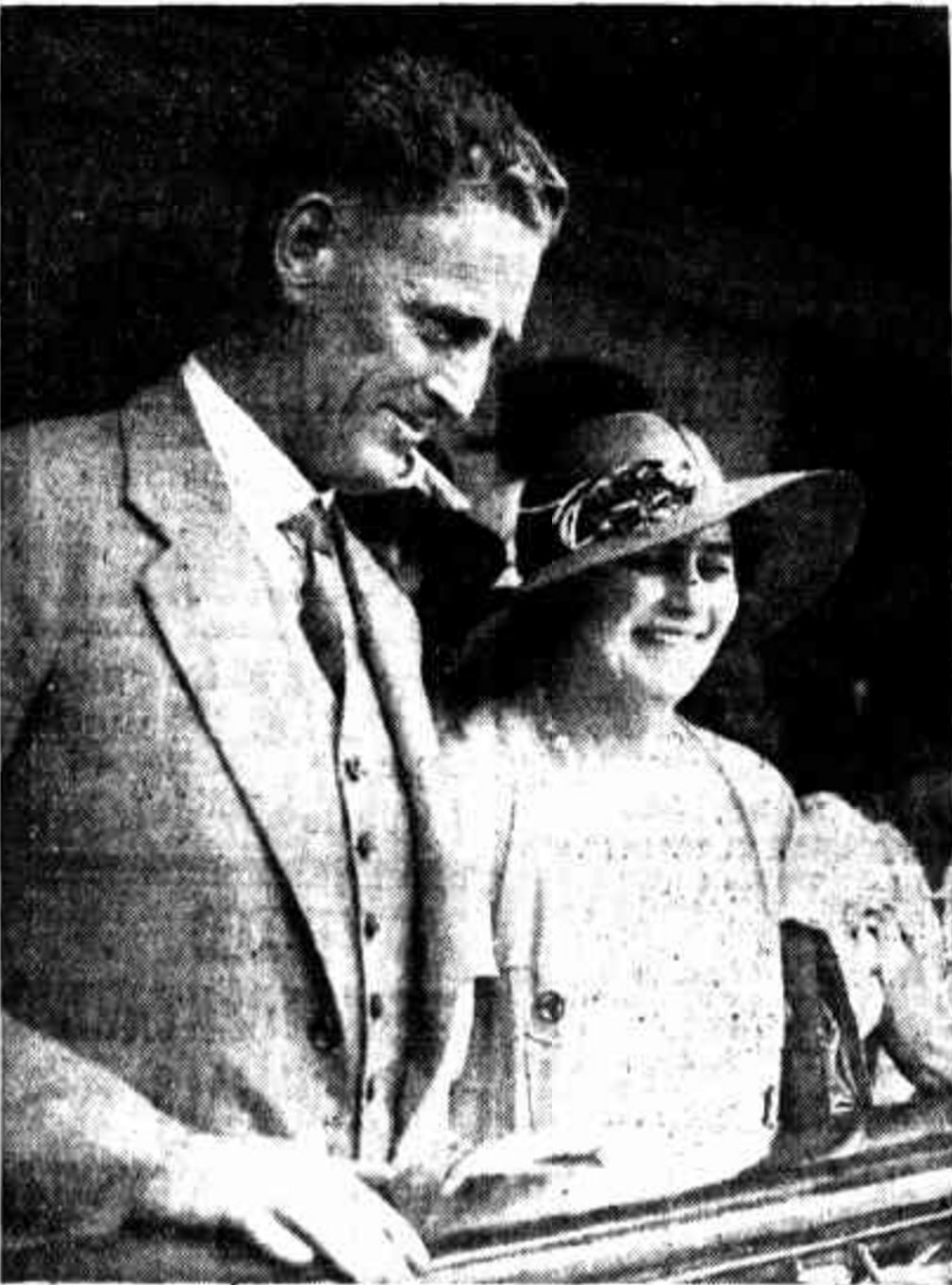
- Dr Alexander Mayes and Mrs Mayes, 1934

Personal information
- Full name: Alexander Dunbar Aitken Mayes
- Born: 24 July 1901; Toowoomba, Australia
- Died: 8 February 1983 (aged 81); Brisbane, Australia
- Source: ESPNcricinfo, 7 January 2017

Alexander Dunbar Aitken Mayes (24 July 1901 – 8 February 1983) was an Australian medical practitioner and cricketer. He played ten first-class matches for New South Wales and Queensland between 1924/25 and 1927/28.

== Early life ==
Mayes is the son of Alexander Mayes, a mayor of Toowoomba, and his second wife Helena Agnes (née Grieve). He attended Toowoomba Grammar School. He married Thora MacPherson on 28 March 1928 at St Andrew's Presbyterian Church, Creek Street, Brisbane.

== Cricket ==
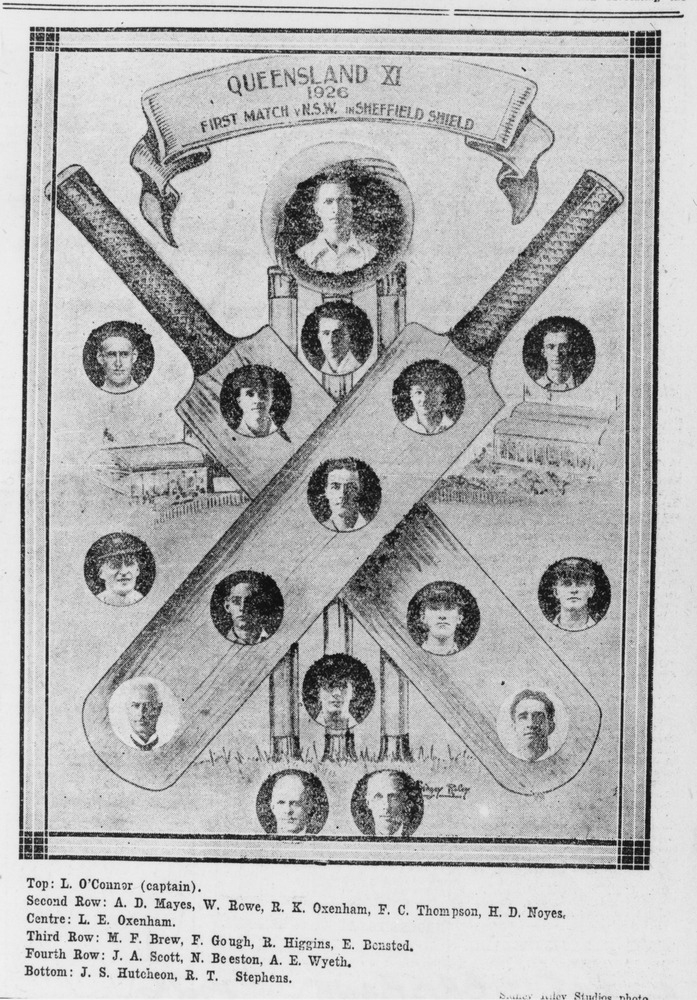
Queensland XI team for Sheffield Shield match against New South Wales, Brisbane, 1926

Mayes was a bowler with the University of Sydney team for several seasons and was selected to represent New South Wales in 1924. He also later represented Queensland. A right-hand batsman, and right-hand medium bowler, in total he played 10 first-class matches between the 1924/25 season and the 1927/28 season. He scored 297 runs at an average of 19.80 with the bat and took 21 wickets at 44.21 with the ball. He was a member of the Queensland XI in the Sheffield Shield competition in 1926.

== Military service ==
During World War II, Mayes served in the Army. Initially, he served as a lieutenant and then captain in the Australian Army Medical Corps as part of the Australian Military Forces, and was assigned to various units including the 7th Field Ambulance. In July 1940, he volunteered for overseas service with the Second Australian Imperial Force, and was subsequently assigned to the 2/25th Infantry Battalion, serving with them in the Middle East. He was promoted to the rank of major in 1942. In 1945, he was posted to 112 Military Hospital in Brisbane, and he was discharged from the 2nd AIF in early 1946, but remained active in the reserves, eventually retiring in 1957 with the rank of lieutenant colonel.

== Medical career ==
Following World War II, Mayes became the chairman of the committee which raised the funding for the construction of St Andrew's War Memorial Hospital in Brisbane, built to honour the memories of the Australians who died in the war. Mayes' vision was "I see a 350 bed hospital as our goal, covering all major specialties, with excellent diagnostic facilities and operating theatres". He served as chairman of the board of governors of the hospital for many years. The hospital had an annual fundraising Scottish fair at Brisbane City Hall each year for which Mayes cooked haggis.

== Later life ==
Although born in Australia, Mayes had a strong affinity for his father's homeland of Scotland. At his death on 8 February 1893, Mayes was the chairman of the Queensland branch of the Society of St Andrew and had served for many years as president of the Caledonian Society. Pixie Annat, matron and CEO of St Andrew's War Memorial Hospital remembers:

"Dr Mayes was a man of great vision and courage, generous of spirit and a Scot to his bootstrap. He visited the hospital every day to see patients and any staff who were sick. During the week he wore a dark suit and bow tie, and at weekends, a sports jacket and trousers and a long Society of St Andrew of Scotland tie. At formal occasions, he naturally wore his kilt and dinner jacket."

== See also ==
- List of New South Wales representative cricketers
