= Elanora, Queensland =

Elanora
- Suburb
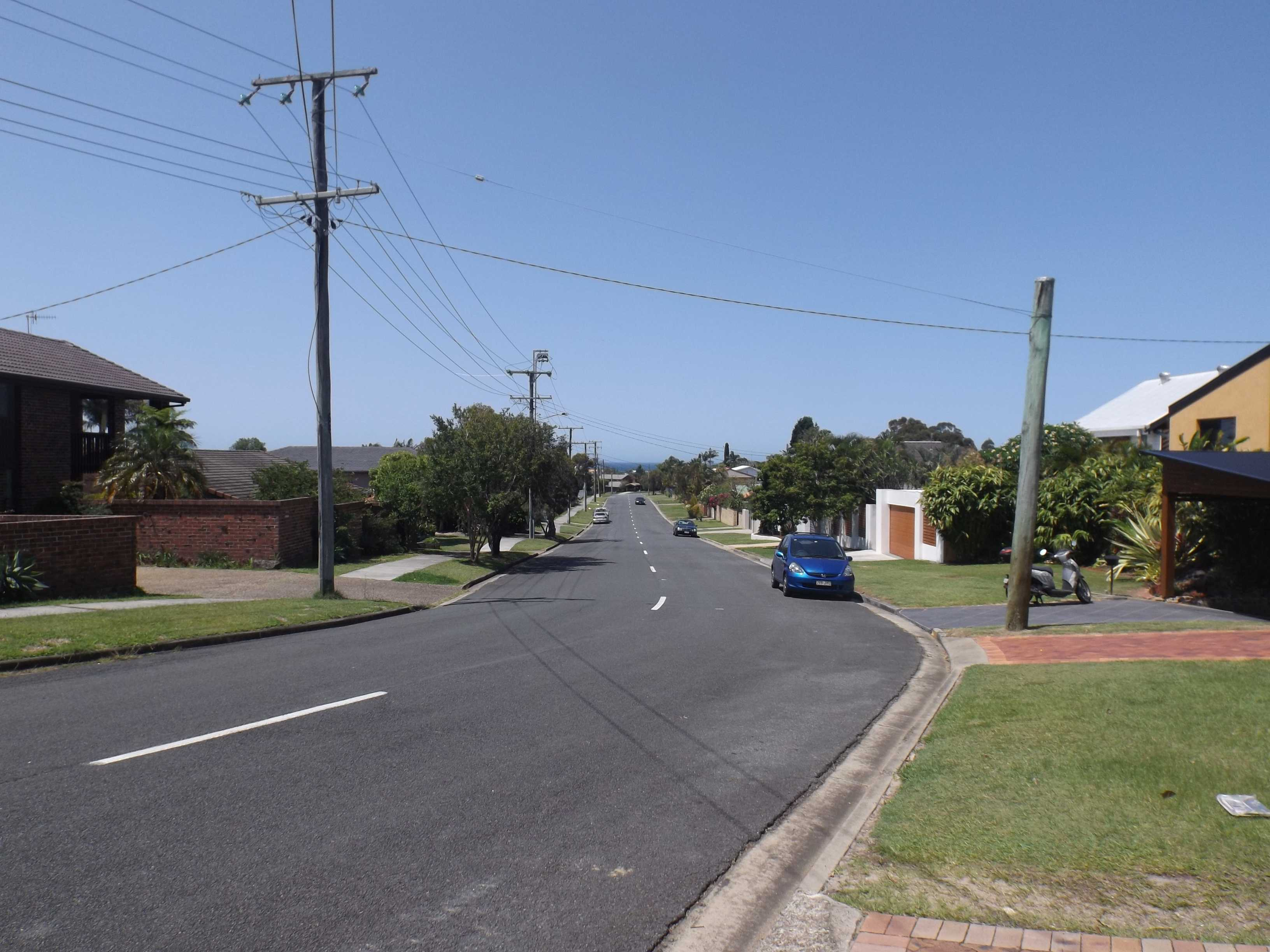
- Seaview Parade, 2015

- Interactive map of Elanora
- Coordinates: 28.1327°S 153.4497°E
- Country: Australia
- State: Queensland
- City: Gold Coast
- LGA: City of Gold Coast
- Location: 20.9 km (13.0 mi) S of Surfers Paradise; 23.3 km (14.5 mi) S of Southport; 92.7 km (57.6 mi) SSE of Brisbane CBD
- Established: 1922

Government
  - State electorate: Currumbin
  - Federal division: McPherson

Area
  - Total: 8.9 km^{2} (3.4 sq mi)
- Elevation: 18 m (59 ft)

Population
  - Total: 12,539 (2021 census)
  - Density: 1,409/km^{2} (3,649/sq mi)
- Time zone: UTC+10:00 (AEST)
- Postcode: 4221
Suburbs around Elanora
Tallebudgera	Burleigh Heads	Palm Beach
Tallebudgera	Elanora	Currumbin Waters
Tallebudgera	Currumbin Valley	Currumbin Waters

Elanora is a suburb of the City of Gold Coast in Queensland, Australia. In the 2021 census, Elanora had a population of 12,539 people.

== Geography ==
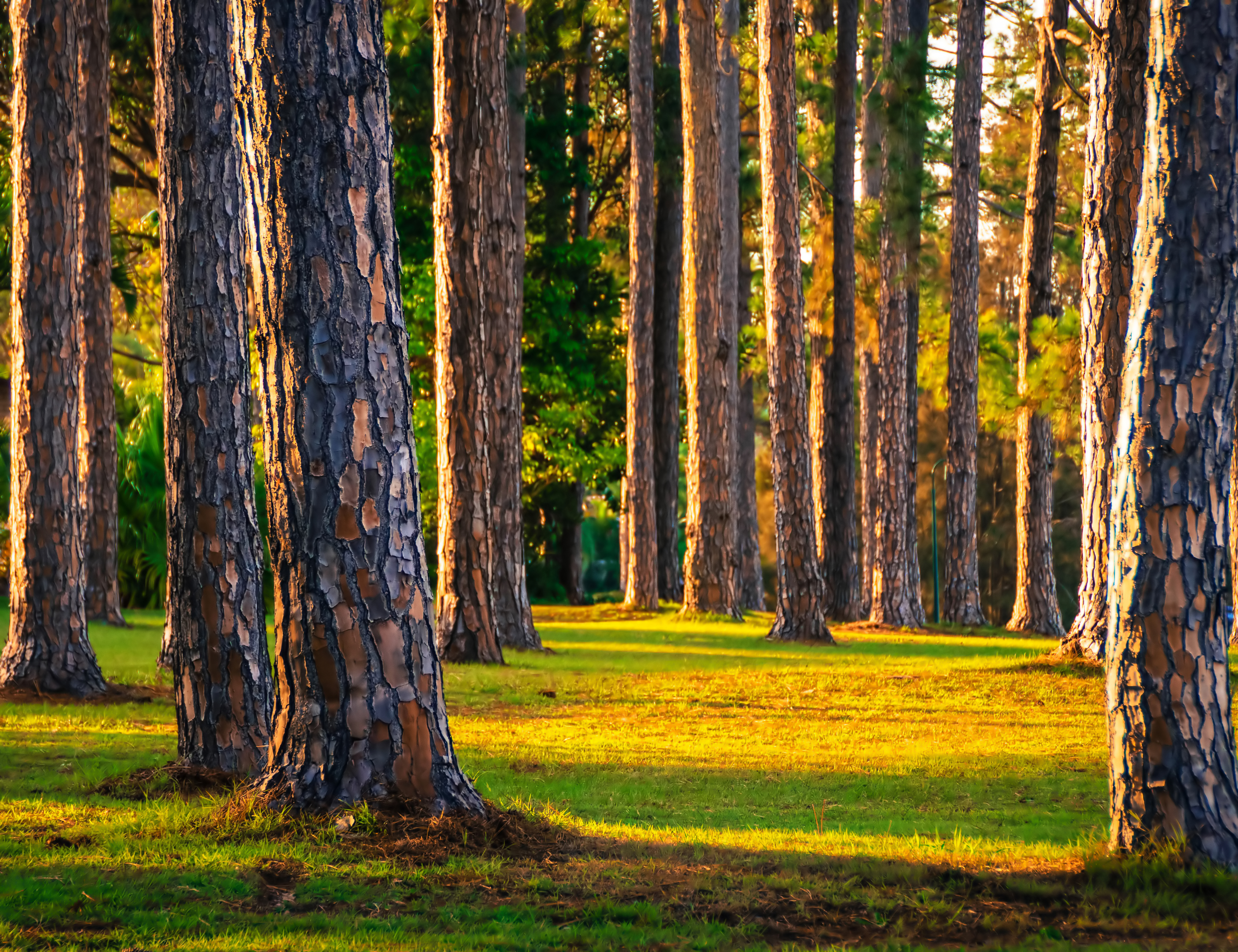
Pine trees in Elanora

Elanora is located between Tallebudgera Creek and Currumbin Creek, 13 kilometres (8 mi) west-north-west of the coastal border town of Coolangatta and 94 kilometres (58 mi) south-southeast of Brisbane, the state capital. Its local government area is the City of Gold Coast.

Elanora is bounded by Tallebudgera Creek to the northwest, Pacific Motorway to the northeast and east, and Guineas Creek and Simpsons Roads to the southeast. It contains Elanora State High School, Elanora Primary School and a small neighbourhood shopping centre on Nineteenth Avenue, and The Pines, a larger shopping centre on Guineas Creek Road. Elanora also has a large public library. Under the Queensland Government proposal to extend the Gold Coast railway line, a station at Elanora, near The Pines Shopping Centre has been proposed.

== History ==
The name Elanora is an Aboriginal word for "home by the sea", was originally named as a railway station on the South Coast Rail Line in 1922.

Elanora Post Office opened 2 May 1927.

Elanora State School opened in January 1983.

Following the amalgamation that created the Uniting Church in Australia in 1977, the Palm Beach Methodist Church, Currumbin Valley Presbyterian Valley and Tallebudgera Presbyterian Church merged to form a single congregation, establishing a new Elanora Uniting Church in 1983.

Elanora State High School opened on 29 January 1990.

Elanora Branch Library opened in 2007 next to The Pines Shopping Centre.

== Demographics ==
In the 2006 census, Elanora had a population of 11,681 people.

In the 2011 census, Elanora recorded a population of 11,645 people, 51.9% female and 48.1% male. The median age of the Elanora population was 41 years, 4 years above the national median of 37. 76.6% of people living in Elanora were born in Australia. The other top responses for country of birth were England 6.3%, New Zealand 5%, South Africa 1%, Scotland 0.7%, Germany 0.5%. 91.7% of people spoke only English at home; the next most common languages were 0.5% German, 0.5% Japanese, 0.4% Italian, 0.4% Spanish, 0.3% Serbian.

In the 2016 census, Elanora had a population of 12,145.

In the 2021 census, Elanora had a population of 12,539 people.

== Education ==
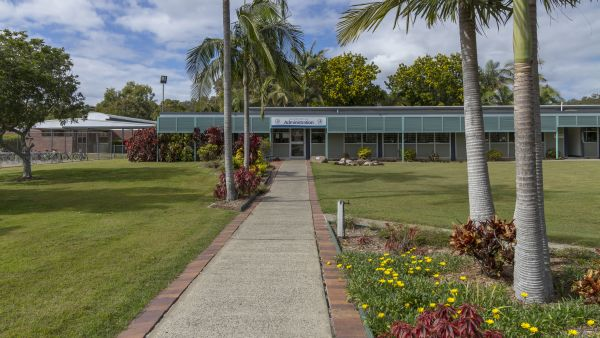
Elanora State High School, 2016

Elanora State School is a government primary (Preparatory to Year 6) school for boys and girls at K P McGrath Drive (28.1307°S 153.4670°E). In 2017, the school had an enrolment of 1,033 students with 77 teachers (67 full-time equivalent) and 34 non-teaching staff (26 full-time equivalent). It includes a special education program.

Elanora State High School is a government secondary (7–12) school for boys and girls on the corner of 19th Avenue and Avocado Street (28.1284°S 153.4495°E). In 2017, the school had an enrolment of 933 students with 82 teachers (75 full-time equivalent) and 49 non-teaching staff (32 full-time equivalent). It includes a special education program.

== Amenities ==
Gold Coast City Council operates Elanora Branch Library in The Pines Shopping Centre, Guineas Creek Road.

Elanora Uniting Church is at 17 Applecross Way (28.1268°S 153.4651°E).

== Politics ==
Elanora is held under the Federal Seat; Division of McPherson. The incumbent member for parliament is Liberal Party member Karen Andrews. In the Queensland Legislative Assembly the suburb is represented by Liberal Party member Laura Gerber. In the Local Government, Gold Coast City Council, Elanora is divided into two divisions: Division 13 and Division 14. Division 13 is represented by Cr Josh Martin and Division 14 is represented by Cr Gail O'Neill.
