= Currumbin, Queensland =

Currumbin
- Suburb
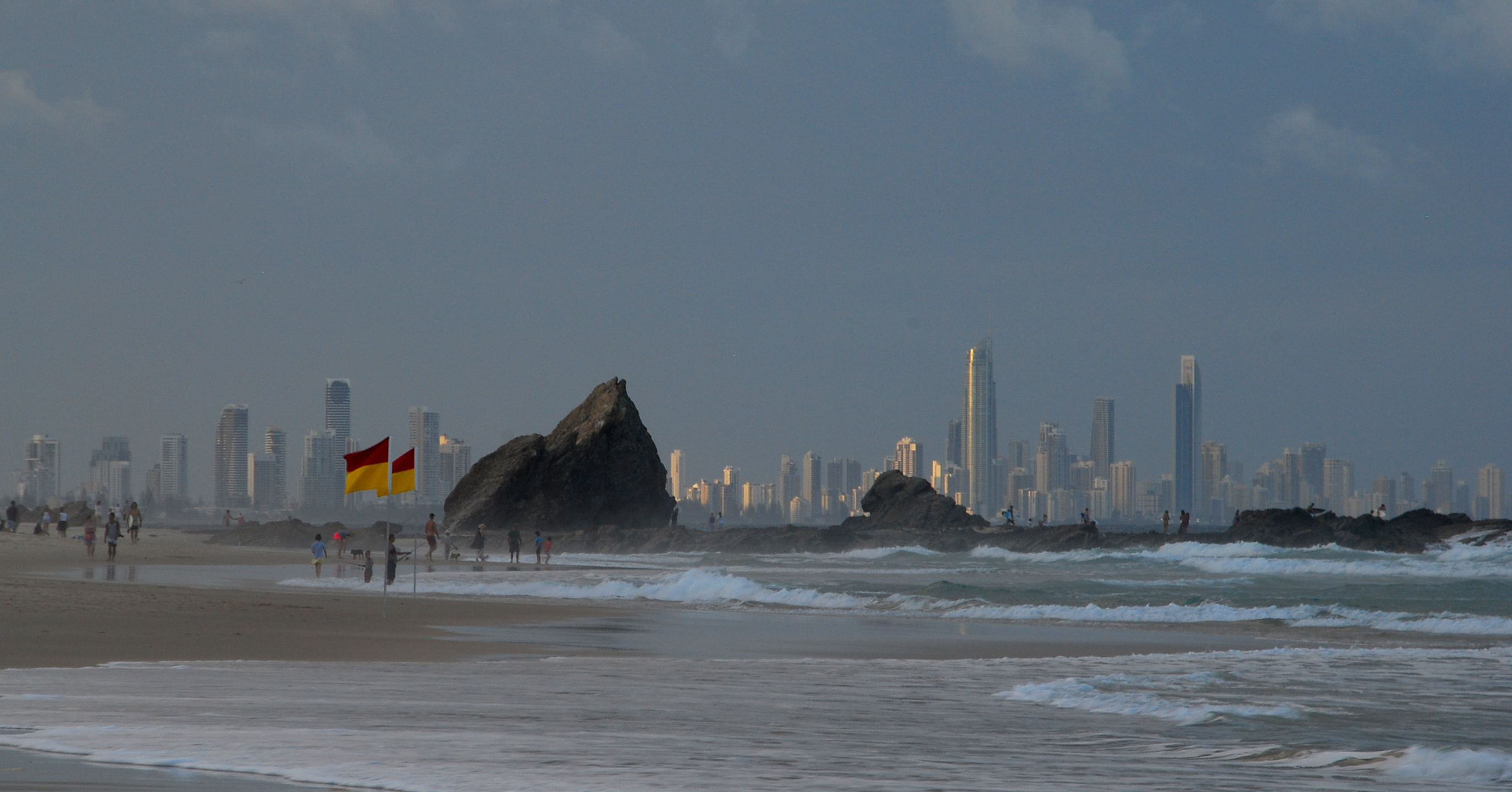
- The Gold Coast skyline from Currumbin Beach

- Interactive map of Currumbin
- Coordinates: 28.1363°S 153.4827°E
- Country: Australia
- State: Queensland
- City: Gold Coast
- LGA: City of Gold Coast
- Location: 11 km (6.8 mi) NW of Tweed Heads; 23 km (14 mi) SSE of Surfers Paradise; 25 km (16 mi) SSE of Southport; 94 km (58 mi) SSE of Brisbane

Government
  - State electorate: Currumbin
  - Federal division: McPherson

Area
  - Total: 2.0 km^{2} (0.77 sq mi)
- Elevation: 5 m (16 ft)

Population
  - Total: 3,278 (2021 census)
  - Density: 1,640/km^{2} (4,240/sq mi)
- Time zone: UTC+10:00 (AEST)
- Postcode: 4223
Suburbs around Currumbin
Palm Beach	Palm Beach	Coral Sea
Palm Beach	Currumbin	Coral Sea
Currumbin Waters	Currumbin Waters	Tugun

Currumbin (/kəˈrʌmbən/ kə-RUM-bən) is a coastal suburb in the City of Gold Coast, Queensland, Australia. In the 2021 census, Currumbin had a population of 3,278 people.

== Geography ==
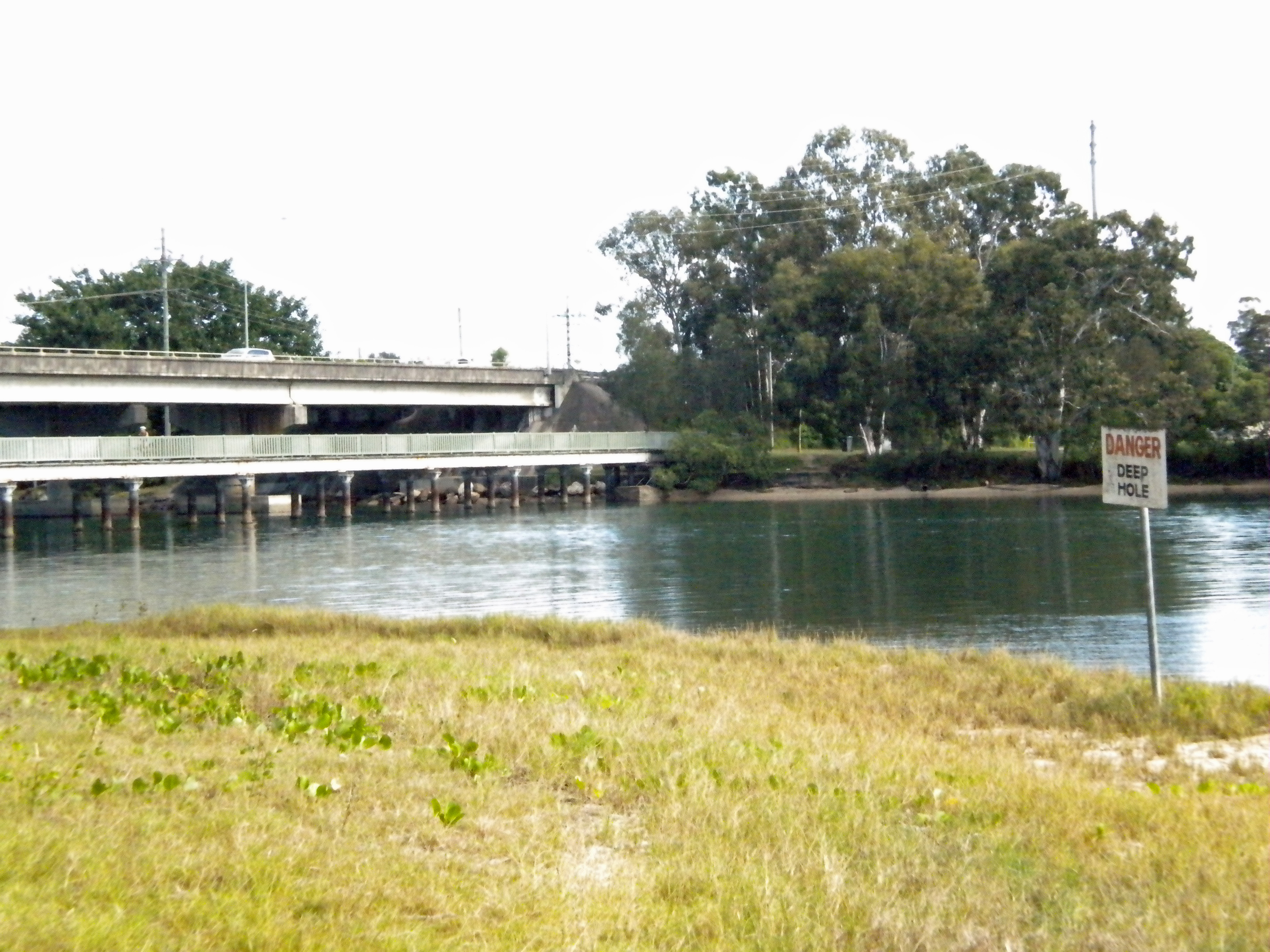
The Pacific Motorway crosses Currumbin Creek

The suburb extends from Currumbin Creek in the north to Wyberba Street in the south. The Pacific Motorway bounds the suburb to the west and the Coral Sea to the east.

The Gold Coast Highway enters the suburb from the north (Palm Beach) and exits to the south (Tugun). The highway is characterised by commercial development along much of its route, but this is absent in Currumbin where the highway winds through bushland over the headland through the Currumbin Hill Conservation Park and then past the Currumbin Wildlife Sanctuary.

Along the coast, Currumbin Rock (28.1250°S 153.4864°E) on Currumbin Point on the south side of the mouth of Currumbin Creek is the start of Currumbin Beach (28.1306°S 153.4886°E), a surf beach, which extends south to Elephant Rock (28.1325°S 153.4903°E).Currumbin Alley is a popular surfing site formed on the bar of Currumbin Creek, particularly well-suited for longboards. Some properties to the south are separated from the beach only by an undeveloped public road reserve and the elevated land provides opportunities for views unusual at the coast.

The Currumbin Valley Reserve is located west of Currumbin. Of late, developments in the area have started to destroy the natural rainforests and wildlife.

The Gold Coast Oceanway follows a beachfront alignment around Currumbin Alley and along Currumbin Beach. Between Tomewin Street and Flat Rock the current Oceanway pavements swing inland along Temmangum Street.

The Currumbin Rock Pools are a popular swimming hole in the upper part of Currumbin Creek. The City Council dredges the entrance of Currumbin Creek each year for flood mitigation, water quality, beach nourishment and navigation.

== History ==
Currumbin is located on the traditional land of the Tulgigin clan of the Yugambeh people. The name Currumbin is derived from the Yugambeh language (Yugambeh: Garambin), and means quicksand or 'a species of pine tree'. It was appropriated for an early farming settlement and later also used as a railway station name.

The entirety of Currumbin was forested before farming and land clearing commenced in the late 19th century. Samuel William Grey was the first European to acquire land in the area.

Currumbin Creek Provisional School opened circa 1896 and closed in 1905.

In 1904, Isle, Love and Co advertised the first subdivisions in Currumbin.

Currumbin Lower State School opened on 29 January 1909 under head teacher Miss Butler, who enrolled 13 children on the first day with a further 10 children enrolled over the next two weeks. In 1924, the school was renamed Currumbin State School.

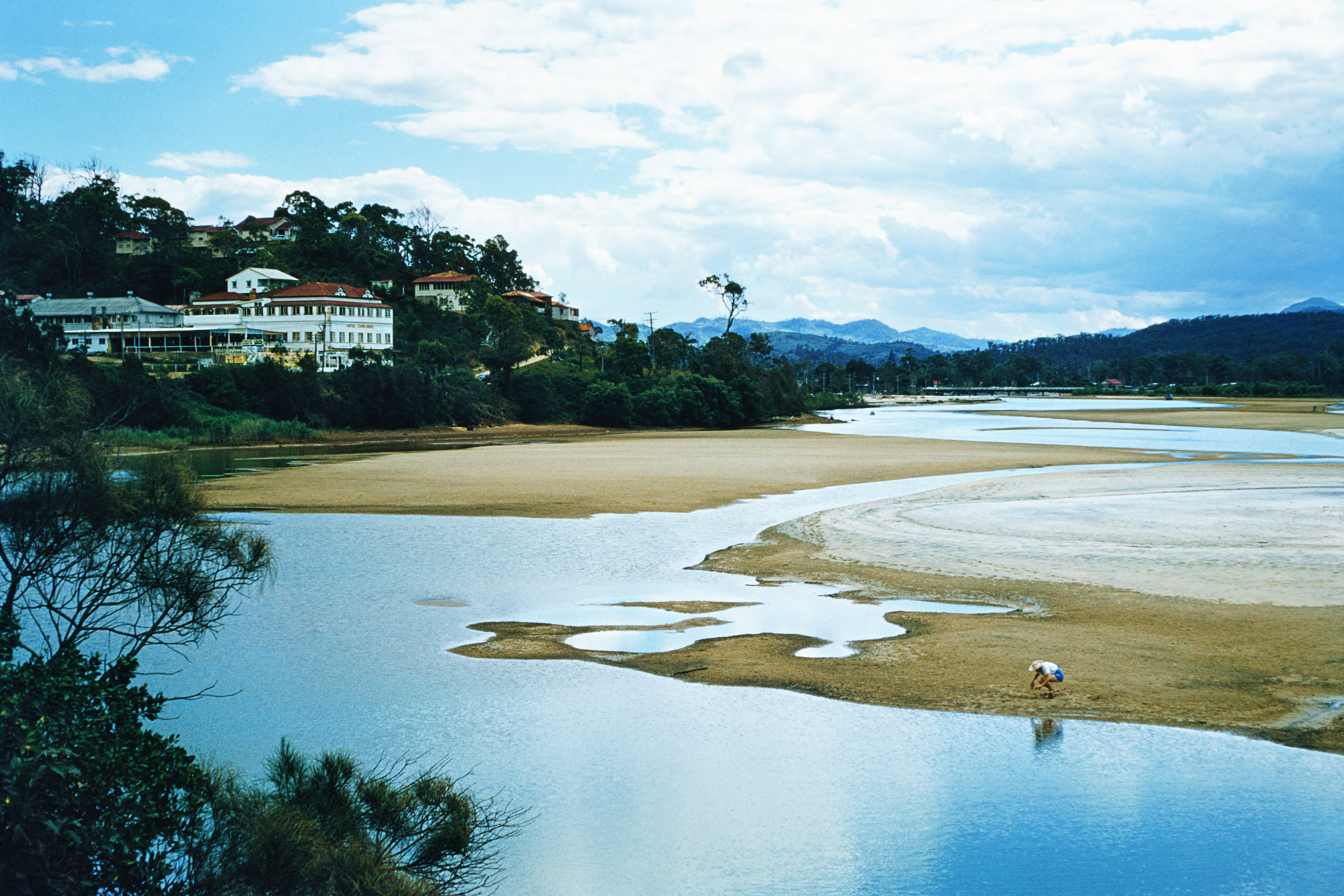
Currumbin Creek and Hotel Currumbin, December 1956

The first hotel was built by Wallace McDonald Nicoll in 1910 on Duringan Street overlooking the mouth of the Currumbin Creek. Currumbin Hotel was demolished in 1996 and replaced with modern apartments.

Tourism and industry significantly increased through the 20th century. Many of the houses at Currumbin date from a period of subdivisions in the 1920s. The area also contains a number of fibro beach houses. Since then later development has occurred including some high rise backing onto the hillside at Pacific Parade.

The Beeches State School opened on 1 June 1925 and closed on 12 March 1948.

On 8 May 1926, a Presbyterian Church was opened at Lower Currumbin by Moderator Reverend Mervyn Henderson. The establishment of the church was led by Alexander Mayes.

Part of Currumbin's success as a tourism, farming and timber hub was access via railway. The Nerang-Tweed line opened in 1903. Vehicular traffic gradually increased and Thrower Drive Bridge opened in 1926. A second road bridge over Currumbin Creek, for the Pacific Highway, opened in 1974.

Ridgetop Provisional School opened on 4 October 1928. In 1933 it was replaced by Ridgetop State School. It closed on 23 July 1967.

Currumbin Beach Methodist Church and camp was officially opened on Saturday 23 March 1940.

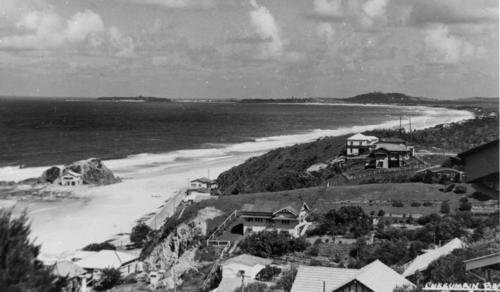
Currumbin Beach, 1938

Generally the area contains more natural vegetation than other areas of the coast due in part to the difficulty of building on the steep hillsides and in part to the presence of the Currumbin Wildlife Sanctuary - a long-standing landmark at the Gold Coast. The Sanctuary comprises a substantial area of land on both sides of the highway adjacent to Flat Rock Creek.

Palm Beach Currumbin State High School opened on 24 January 1972 in neighbouring Palm Beach (immediately across Currumbin Creek).

In 2013, Currumbin was named Australia's cleanest beach by the national organisation Keep Australia Beautiful. At an award ceremony in the City of Cockburn in Western Australia, Currumbin was commended in particular for its excellence in community involvement and partnerships.

During 2020 and 2021, the Queensland borders were closed to most people due to the COVID-19 pandemic. Border crossing points were either closed or had a Queensland Police checkpoint to allow entry to only those people with an appropriate permit. The Pacific Motorway at Currumbin had one of the police checkpoints.

== Demographics ==
In the 2011 census, Currumbin recorded a population of 2,785 people, 50.9% female and 49.1% male. The median age of the Currumbin population was 41 years, 4 years above the national median of 37. 73.7% of people living in Currumbin were born in Australia. The other top responses for country of birth were New Zealand 5%, England 4.5%, South Africa 1.1%, United States of America 1%, Scotland 0.7%. 88.4% of people spoke only English at home; the next most common languages were 0.5% Portuguese, 0.5% Japanese, 0.5% Swedish, 0.5% Italian, 0.5% Spanish.

In the 2016 census, Currumbin had a population of 2,920 people.

In the 2021 census, Currumbin had a population of 3,278 people.

== Heritage listings ==
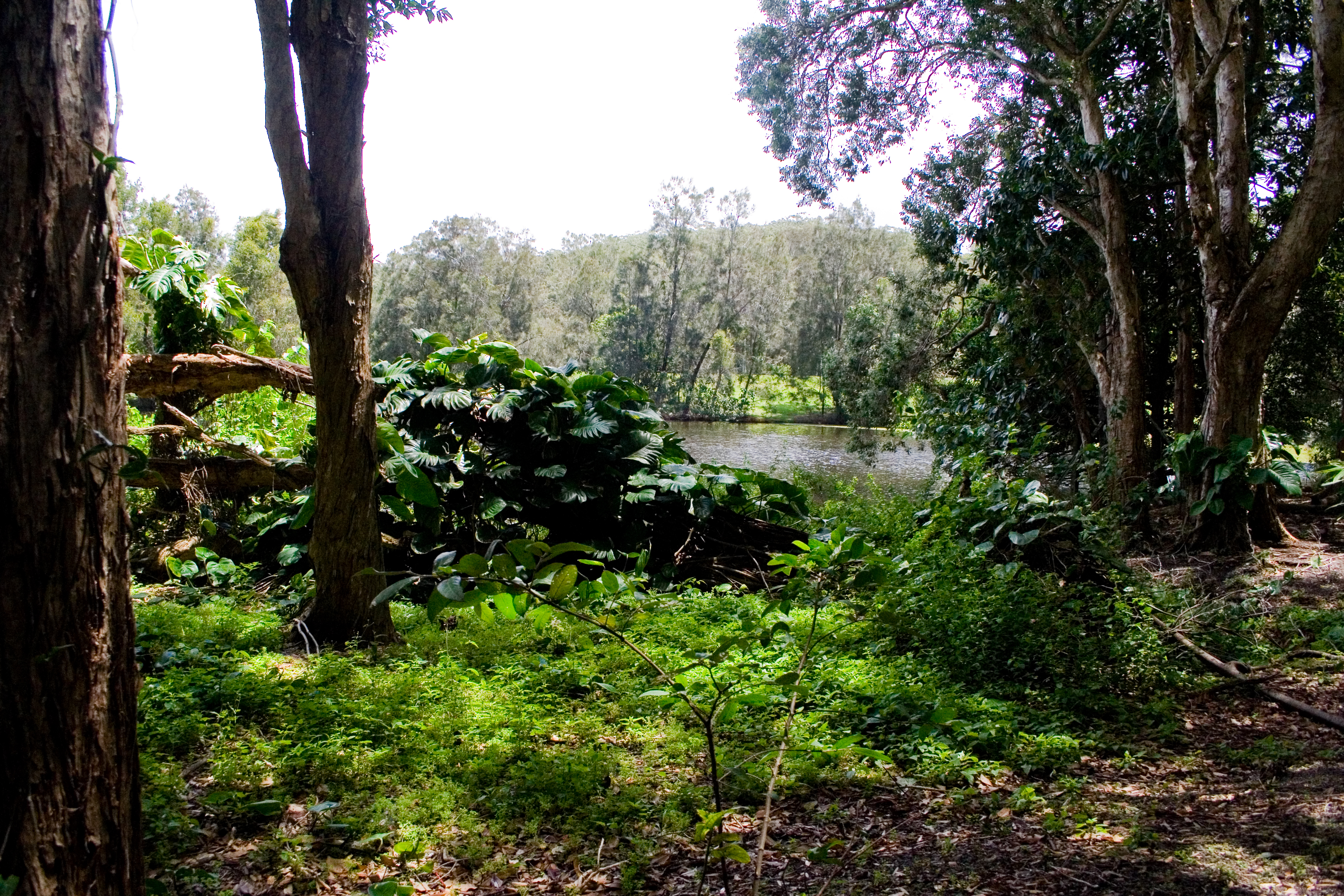
Currumbin Wildlife Sanctuary

Currumbin has a number of heritage-listed sites, including:

- Currumbin Creek (28.1367°S 153.4723°E): former Currumbin Creek Railway Bridge on the South Coast railway line
- 28 Tomewin Street: Currumbin Wildlife Sanctuary

== Education ==
Currumbin State School is a government primary (Preparatory to Year 6) school for boys and girls at 6 Philip Street (28.1378°S 153.4780°E). In 2017, the school had an enrolment of 1,089 students with 73 teachers (63 full-time equivalent) and 32 non-teaching staff (23 full-time equivalent). It includes a special education program.

There is no secondary school in Currumbin, but Palm Beach Currumbin State High School (28.1317°S 153.4745°E) is in Palm Beach just across Currumbin Creek with a bridge connection on Thrower Drive.

== Sport and recreation ==
A number of well-known sporting clubs represent the local area. One of them is the well known NRL club named the Gold Coast Titans and the Gold Coast Rugby League team Currumbin Eagles plus Palm Beach Currumbin Australian Football Club, Palm Beach Currumbin Alleygators RUC and Currumbin Beach Vikings Surf Life Saving Club.

== Events ==
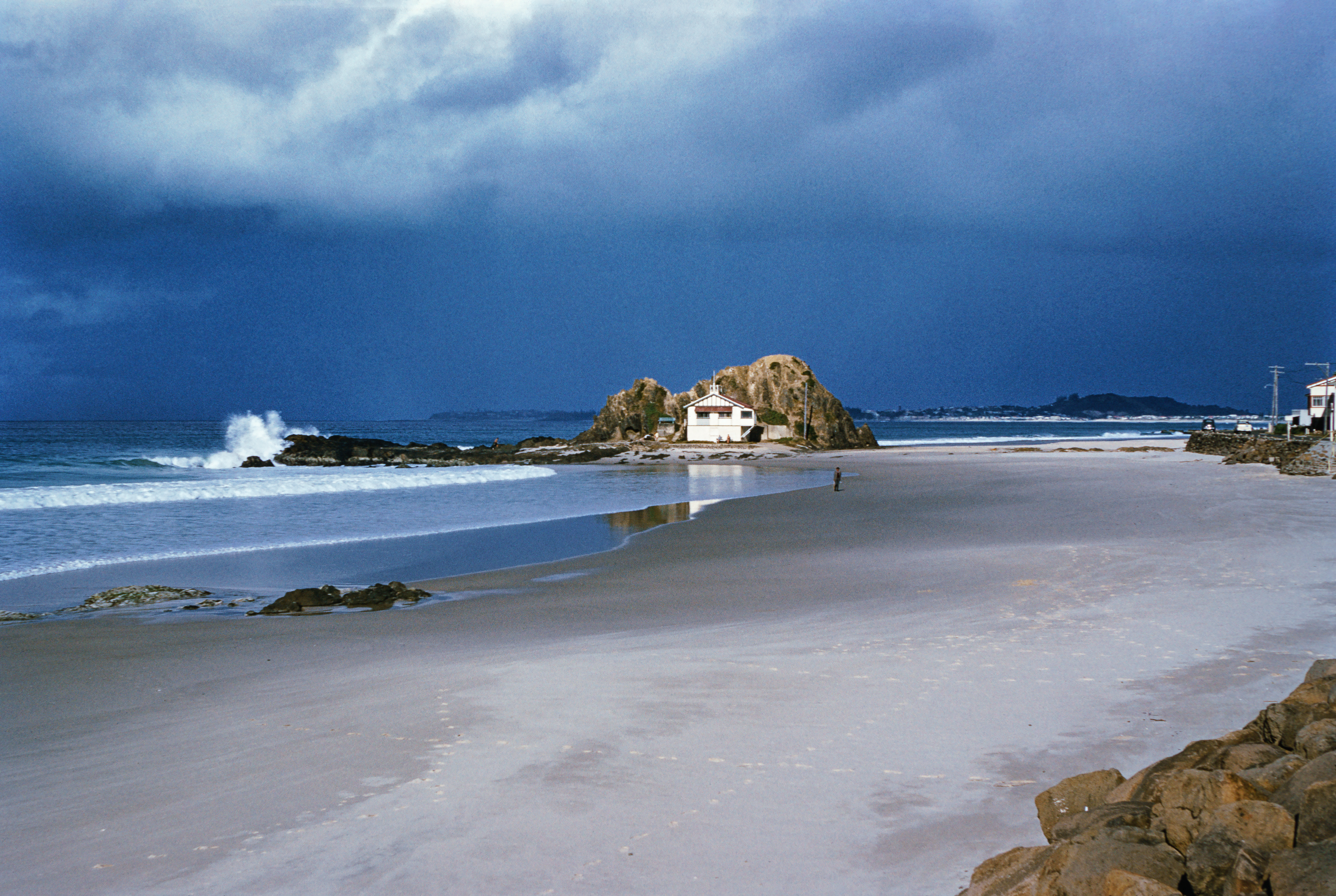
Looking towards the surf lifesaving shed on Elephant Rock, Currumbin Beach, 1959

Each year during September, the Swell Sculpture Festival is held along the Oceanway at Currumbin between Currumbin Creek and Elephant Rock. Elephant rock becomes a pedestal for a signature artwork. Other artwork is spread out along the Oceanway pavements and upon the beach and dune areas. Artwork from the festival often finds its way onto display on public and private spaces across the Gold Coast region including a horse in the park at Broadbeach, Fish along the foreshore at Harley Park, Pelicans along the bank of Currumbin Creek, a seal mother and pup along the Oceanway at Miami, a ship up on Point Danger and a metal goddess within a subdivision at Reedy Creek.

Nearby the Currumbin In The Bin short film festival usually coincides with the Swell Sculpture festival held in the carpark opposite the Currumbin Wildlife Sanctuary.

== See also ==
- Currumbin Ecovillage
- Currumbin Alley
