= Currumbin Alley =

Australian surf break

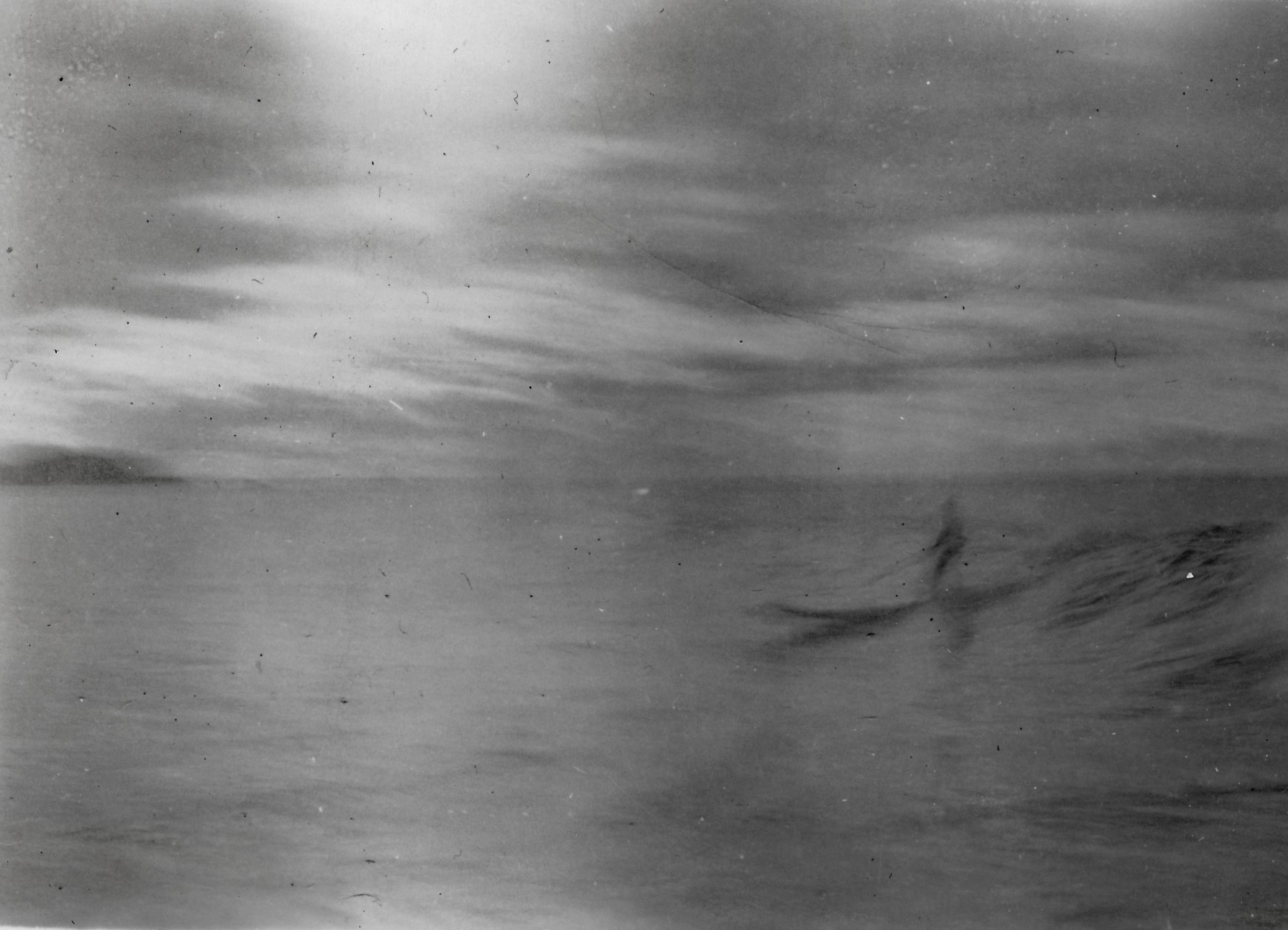
- Currumbin Alley

Details
- Location: Currumbin, Queensland, Australia
- Coordinates: 28°7′25″S 153°28′49″E

Currumbin Alley is a surf break at Currumbin on the Gold Coast in Queensland, Australia. The Alley is one of the more famous breaks on the Gold Coast along with Superbank and Burleigh Heads among others. Waves wrap around the point and towards the creek. It is exposed to perfect beginners conditions towards the creek and some right-handers towards the point. There's also a great wave just across the channel called Lacey's Lane. The Alley marks the mouth of Currumbin Creek.

== See also ==
- Currumbin Rock
