= Nicoll Scrub National Park =

National park in Australia

- IUCN category II (national park)
- Location within Queensland
- Location: Queensland
- Nearest city: Tweed Heads
- Coordinates: 28°11′22″S 153°25′25″E
- Area: 27 ha (67 acres)
- Established: 1986
- Governing body: Queensland Parks and Wildlife Service

Nicoll Scrub is a national park in South East Queensland, Australia, 88 km southeast of Brisbane. It adjoins the Currumbin Valley Reserve and protects remnant rainforest vegetation. The park occupies the area between Mount Coolagang and Mount Boololagung of the McPherson Range.

== Topography and geology ==
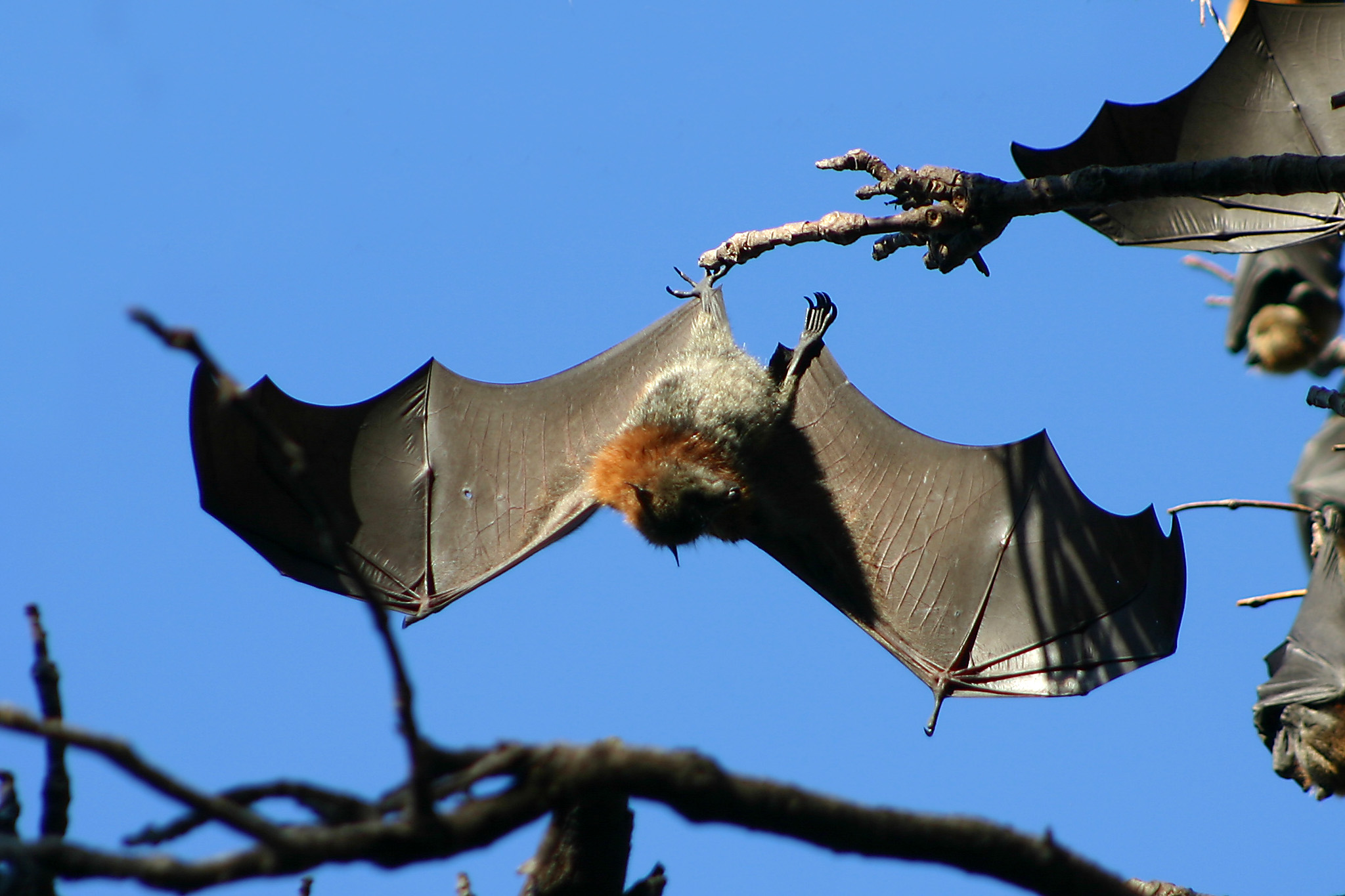
Grey-headed flying fox

The park's highest point is 180 m above sea level. Soils and geology of Nicoll Scrub National Park is characterized by hills of palaeozoic metasediments and phyllites with cappings of tertiary basalt.

== Flora and fauna ==
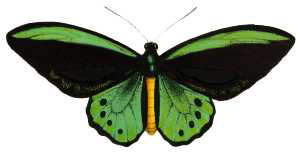
The Richmond birdwing (Ornithoptera richmondia), species endemic to Australia

The park has a rich diversity of plant life. It has five types of rainforest. It has a total of 200 plant species, of which two are endangered and six fall in the vulnerable species category. The rainforests of the Nicoll Scrub National Park are the only remaining ones in the middle and lower Currumbin Valley.

Nicoll Scrub National Park has over 78 vertebrate species, including seven species of mammal, 56 species of birds, six species of reptiles and eight species of amphibians. Among the park's most rare and fascinating residents are the Richmond birdwing butterfly (Ornithoptera richmondia), grey-headed flying fox (Pteropus poliocephalus) and black flying fox (Pteropus alecto).

== See also ==
- Protected areas of Queensland
