= Alexander Mayes =

Scottish politician and builder in colonial Queensland (1859–1941)

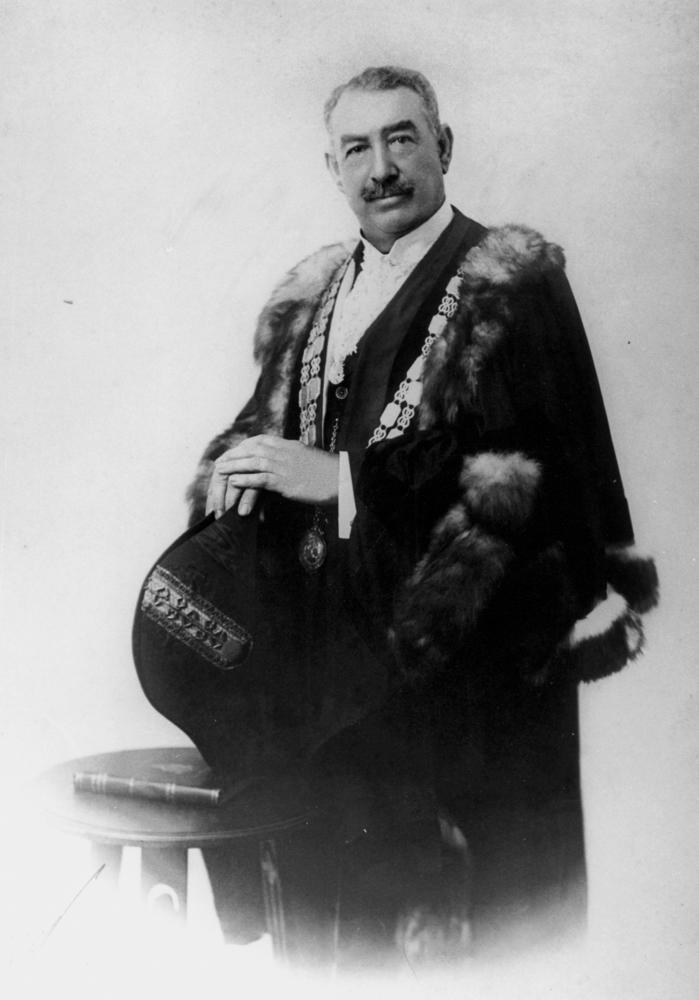
- Alexander Mayes in 1917.
- Born: 1859; Largo, Fifeshire, Scotland
- Died: 1941 (aged 81–82); Scotland
- Occupations: Politician; Builder

Alexander Mayes (1859–1941) was a builder and politician in Toowoomba, Queensland, Australia. He was Mayor of Toowoomba.

== Early life ==
Alexander Mayes was born on 17 July 1859 in Largo, Fifeshire, Scotland. He learned his trade as a builder in Edinburgh, London and Glasgow. Mayes moved to Toowoomba in June 1886 at the age of 26.

== Business life ==
Mayes spent 35 years in Toowoomba, becoming a prominent builder. He is known to have worked on the Toowoomba City Hall, Toowoomba Post Office, Tooowoomba Masonic Hall, Commercial Bank, Toowoomba Technical College and Vacy Hall and many private homes. Circa 1901, he built his own home Largo (now the heritage-listed Gowrie House) based on a design by Toowoomba architect, Harry Marks.

== Public service ==
Mayes was active in local politics, being mayor of Toowoomba in 1896, 1903 and 1917. He was honorary superintendent of the Toowoomba Fire Brigade for many decades.

He was a prominent Freemason.

== Personal life ==
Mayes was married twice. He married his first wife Eleanor Godsall (née Hickey, 1843–1896), the widow of Toowoomba mayor Richard Godsall (1837–1885) on 20 June 1888; she had nine children by her first marriage. Eleanor died on 23 August 1896. He married his second wife, Miss Helena Agnes (Nellie) Grieves of Warwick, on 6 October 1897 in the Warwick Presbyterian Church. He had four sons with his second wife: Bruce Toowoomba Mayes (a professor of obstetrics at University of Sydney), Alex Mayes (a doctor and cricket player), Hector Mayes and Charles Mayes (a Presbyterian minister).

== Later life ==
Mayes left Toowoomba in 1922 for Bilinga near Coolangatta and returned to Scotland in 1926. A staunch Presbyterian, he led the establishment of a Presbyterian church in Lower Currumbin, which officially opened on 8 May 1926.

He died in his residence in Newmarket, Brisbane on 28 November 1940. He was cremated at the Mount Thompson Crematorium on 30 November 1940. His wife Nellie died on 25 April 1948 and her cremated remains are interred with her husband's in the crematorium grounds.
