= Currumbin Ecovillage =

Residential community in Australia

Coordinates: 28.1762°S 153.4292°E

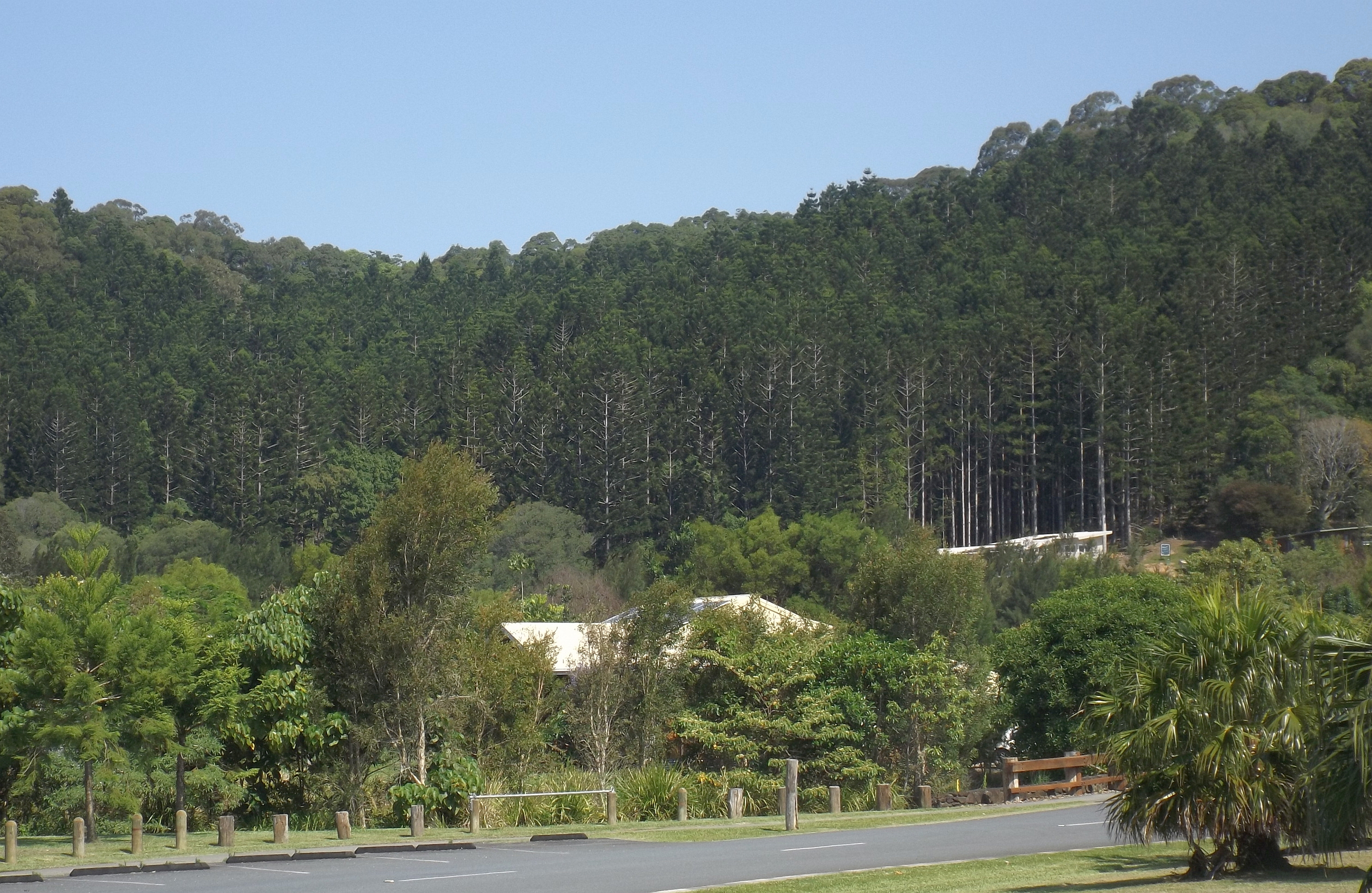
Pine forest, dwellings and gardens, 2015

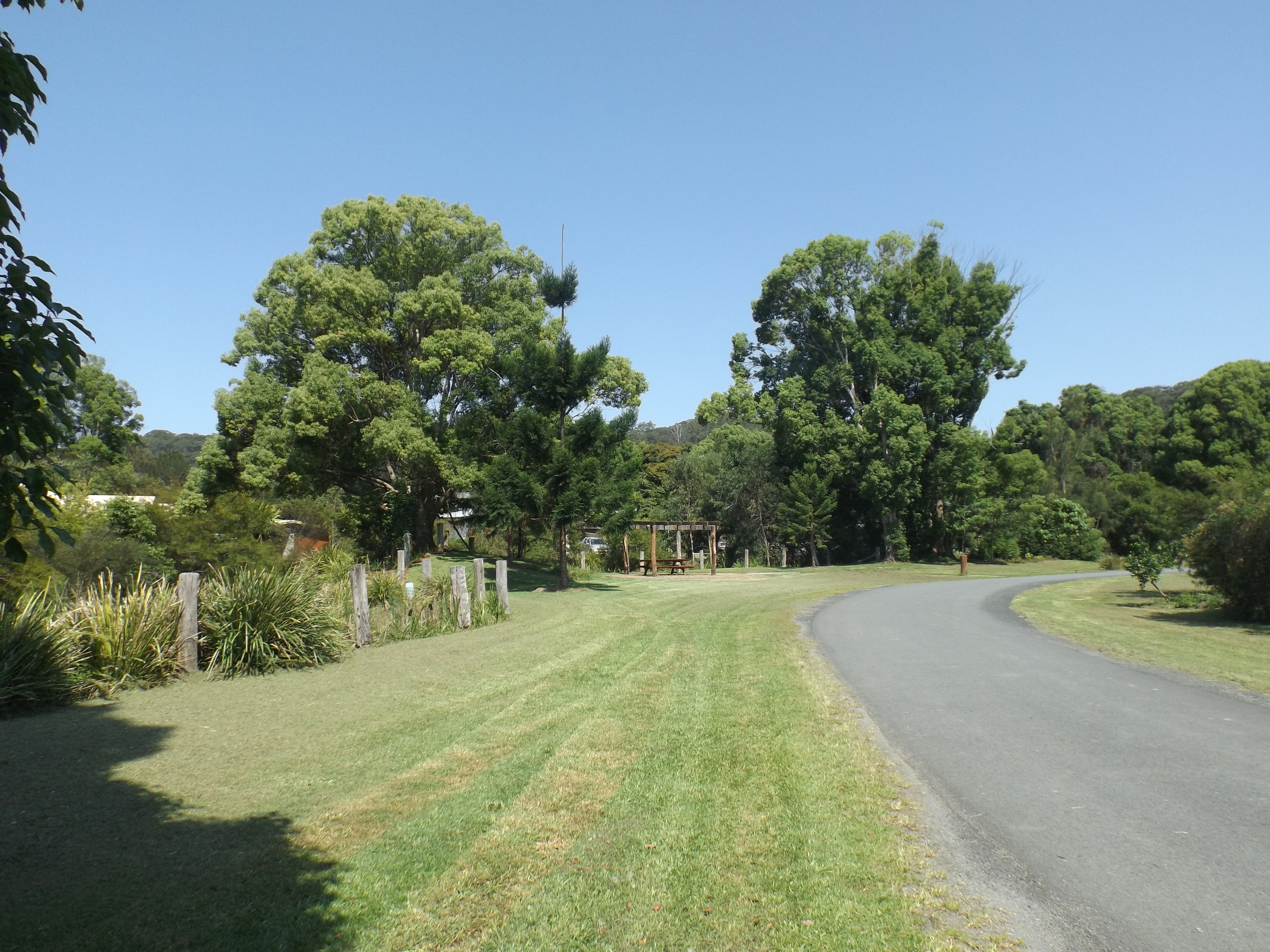
Roadside, 2015

The Ecovillage at Currumbin is an innovative residential community at 639 Currumbin Creek Road, Currumbin Valley, Queensland, Australia. It showcases best practices in residential ecologically sustainable development. The ecovillage project has been developed on degraded farmland on the exurban fringe of City of Gold Coast, a major resort city on Queensland’s South East Queensland coast. The developer, Land Matters Currumbin Valley, has rehabilitated the site and is protecting its environmental integrity and biodiversity by preserving 50 percent of the site as an environmental reserve.

It is on a 300-acre (1.2 km^{2}) site comprising 80% bushland, plus open spaces and 141 home sites. The ecovillage is master planned with many homes architecturally designed. It was established by Chris Walton and his wife Kerry Shepherd. Currumbin Ecovillage lacks adequate public transport. Residents are car-reliant.

== Sustainability ==
All homes within the Ecovillage include complete water autonomy. Smart design and excellent energy ratings assist the homes to be comfortable all year round with low environmental impact. The estate also has grid-connected solar power, edible landscapes, permaculture, waste minimisation and recycling. Residents have access to communal areas including a small village centre, green spaces and indoor and outdoor recreational facilities. Dogs and cats are prohibited by a registered covenant. Exotic vegetation was initially prohibited but is now permitted.

Gold Coast Water was consulted regarding water benchmarks and the Environmental Protection Agency for waste treatment metrics. By-laws were required as a range of codes for assessing the developments environmental design compliance.

== Awards ==
The ecovillage is a Queensland Government EnergyWise and WaterWise Demonstration Project and involves significant partnership with community, universities, industry and government. The Ecovillage has received 26 awards including the 2008 International Prix D’Excellence, and the Housing Industry Association’s 2008 Green Smart National Building of the Year Award for one of The Ecovillage’s sustainable homes. In 2010, The Ecovillage was appointed by the Gold Coast City Council as its ‘Innovation Estate’, demonstrating the City’s desired future form of development.

== See also ==
- Currumbin Valley
- Sustainability
