= Currumbin Creek =

Currumbin
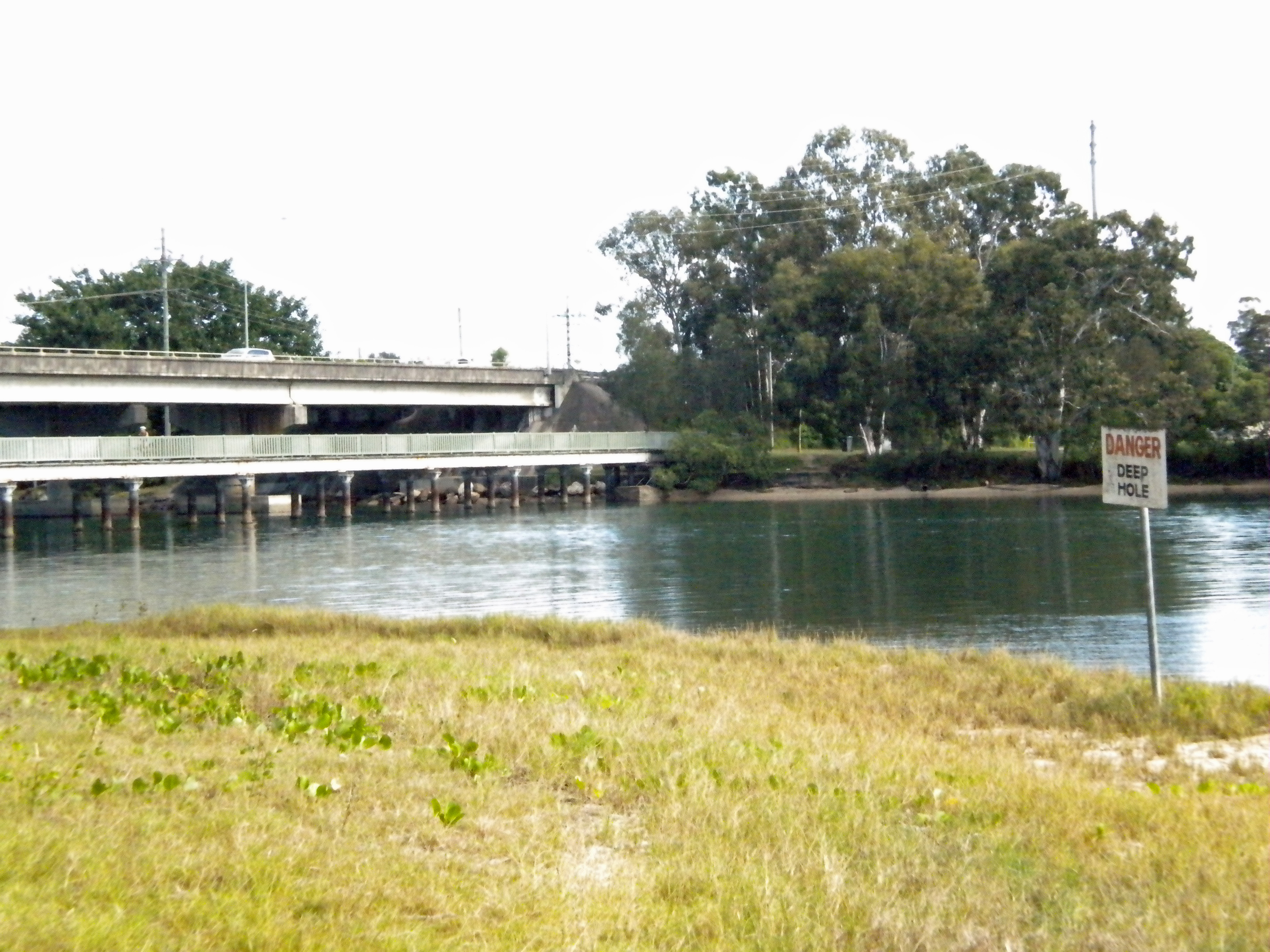
- The Gold Coast Highway crossing Currumbin Creek

- Location of the Currumbin Creek mouth in Queensland

Location
- Country: Australia
- State: Queensland
- Region: South East Queensland
- Local government area: City of Gold Coast

Physical characteristics
- Source: Mount Cougal
  - location: Gold Coast hinterland
  - coordinates: 28°14′20″S 153°21′57″E
  - elevation: 138 m (453 ft)
- Mouth: Coral Sea
  - location: Currumbin Alley, Currumbin
  - coordinates: 28°7′25″S 153°28′49″E
  - elevation: 0 m (0 ft)
- Length: 24 km (15 mi)
- Basin size: 489 km^{2} (189 sq mi)

Basin features
- National park: Springbrook National Park

The Currumbin Creek is a creek in South East Queensland, Australia. Its catchment lies within the City of Gold Coast local government area and covers an area of 489 square kilometres (189 sq mi). The river is approximately 24 kilometres (15 mi) long and provides a popular and tranquil setting for many rowing clubs, kayakers, jet skiers, boaters and fishermen.

== Course and features ==
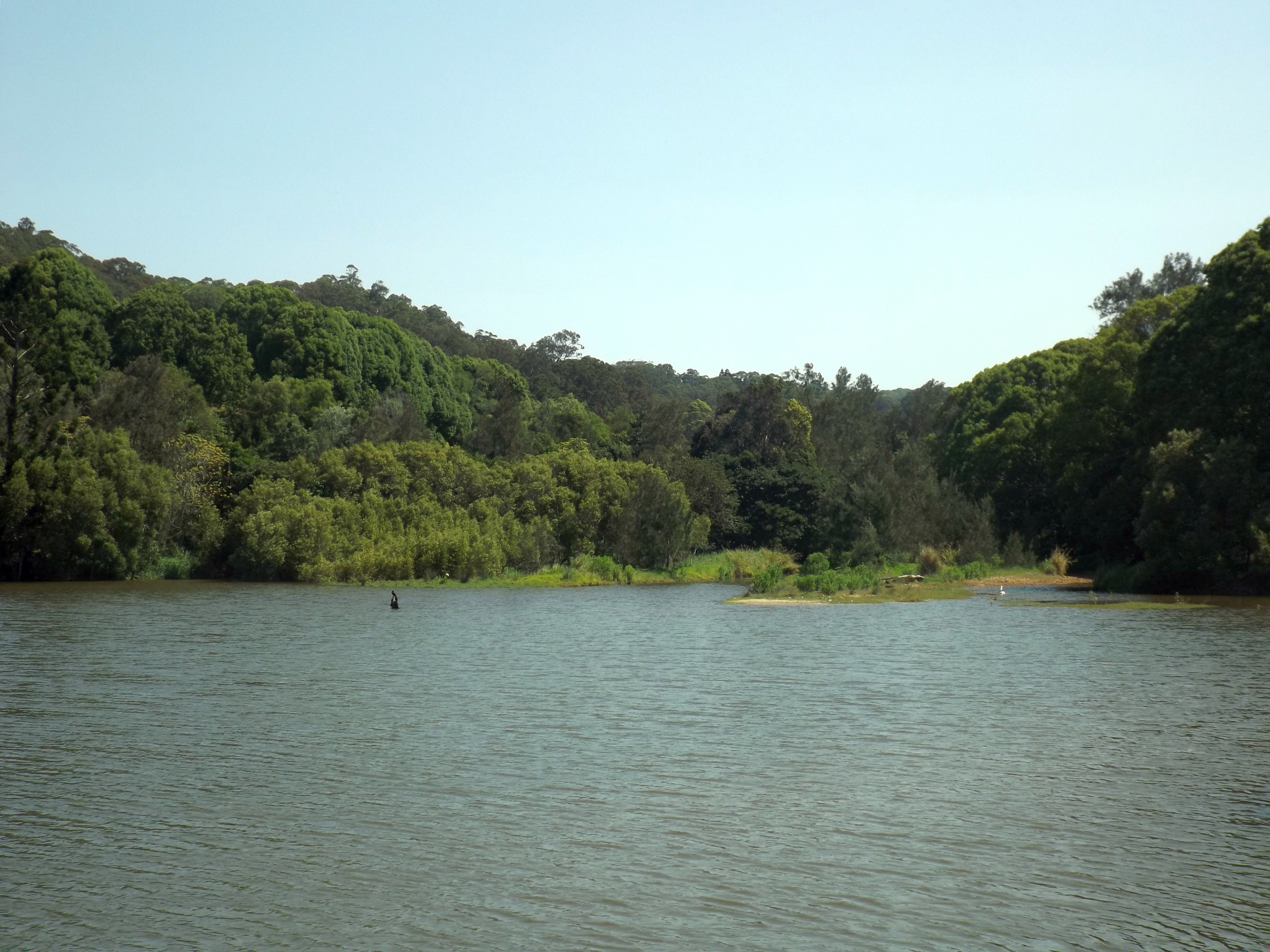
Robert Neumann Park in Currumbin Valley, 2015

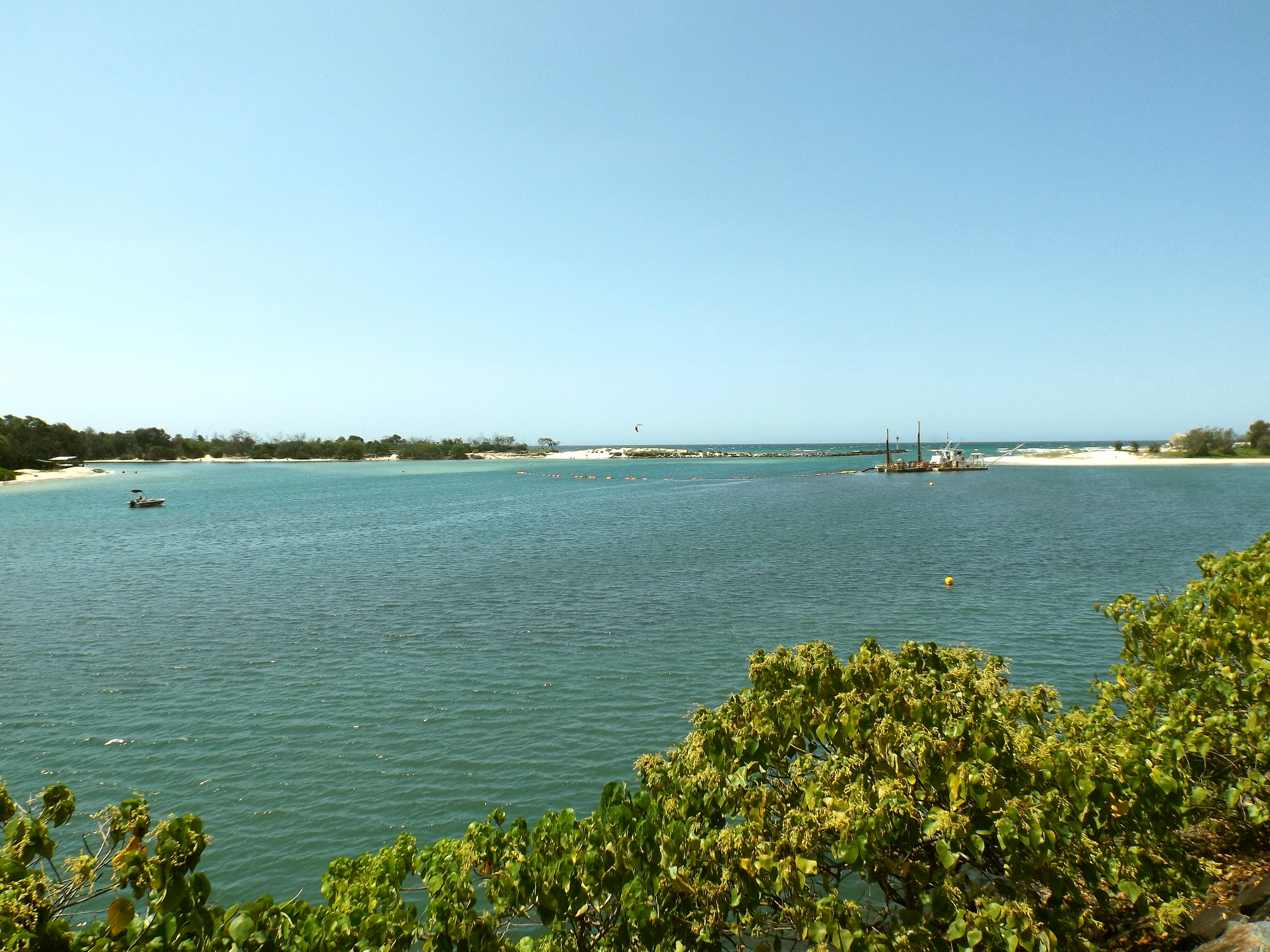
Creek mouth, 2015

The Currumbin Creek rises in the Gold Coast hinterland below Mount Cougal in the Springbrook National Park, west of the New South Wales settlement of Tomewin and north of the New South Wales/Queensland border. The creek flows generally north by east through the Currumbin Valley towards Currumbin where it is crossed by the Pacific Motorway and the Gold Coast Highway, before reaching its mouth at Currumbin Alley and emptying into the Coral Sea. The creek descends 138 metres (453 ft) over its 24-kilometre (15 mi) course.

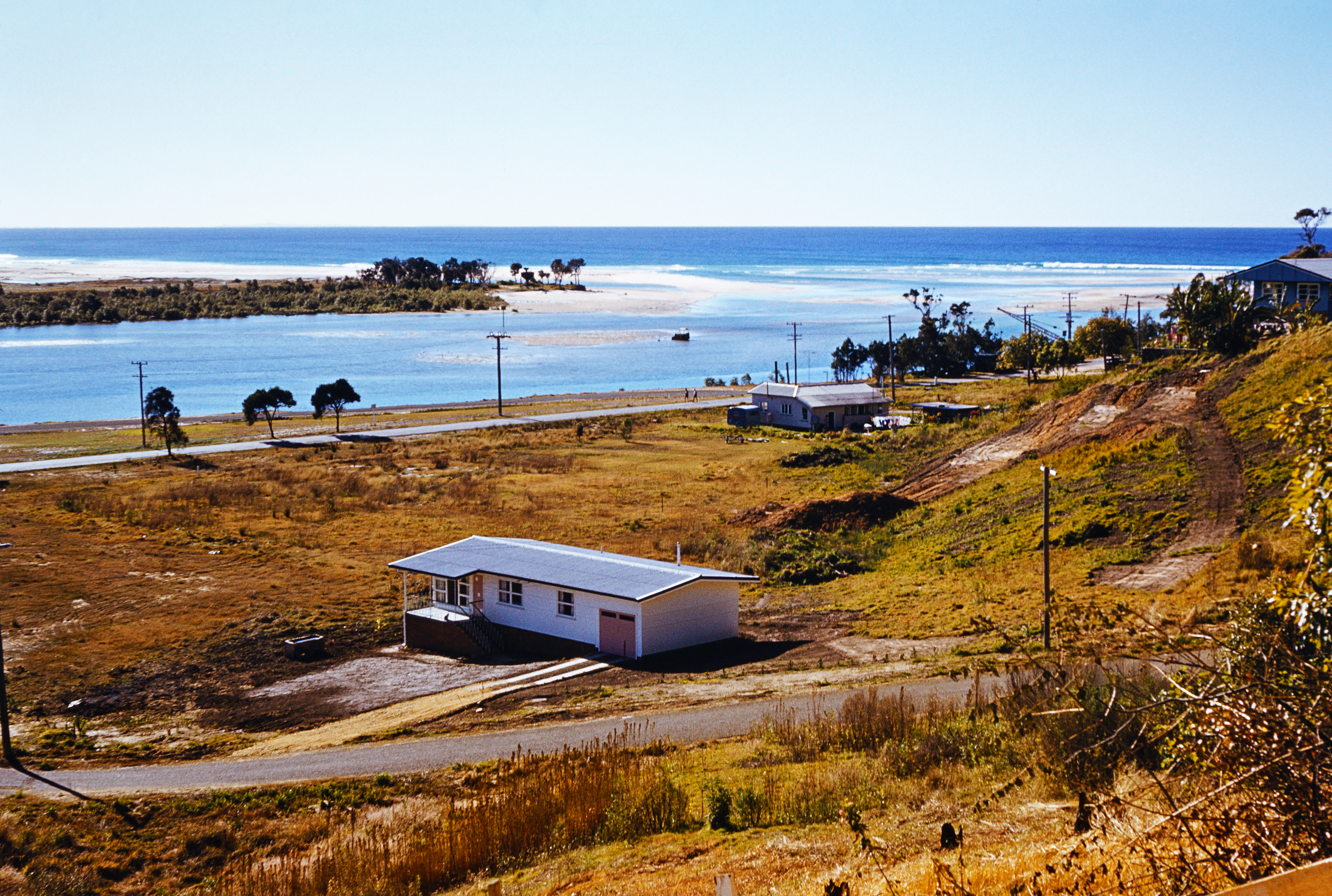
Currumbin Creek mouth, July 1961

Near the creek mouth at Currumbin Alley a 100-metre-long (330 ft) and 30–40-metre-wide (100–130 ft) swimming canal points northward. The demolition of the Palm Beach Bowls Club cleared way for a grass park and path to the shore of the canal, which is ideal for swimming, unlike many of the bull shark-containing waters and canals further inland. Currumbin Creek has an extensive canal system similar to its cousin Tallebudgera Creek and the larger, further north Nerang River. The shores of these canals have some of the Gold Coast's most prestigious housing. The lower estuary is a dynamic environment, strongly influenced by the processes of tidal flushing and infilling by coastal sands. This process leads to the natural constriction of the creek mouth, and requires intermittent dredging to minimise flood impacts. The lower estuary provides a significant aquatic and shore based recreational resource for the city, attracting fishermen, swimmers, surfers and boating enthusiasts.

The City of Gold Coast runs a volunteer Beaches to Bushland restoration program. The Currumbin Creek Care Group, established in 2008, helps restore native vegetation in parkland running on the lower areas of Currumbin Creek.

== History ==
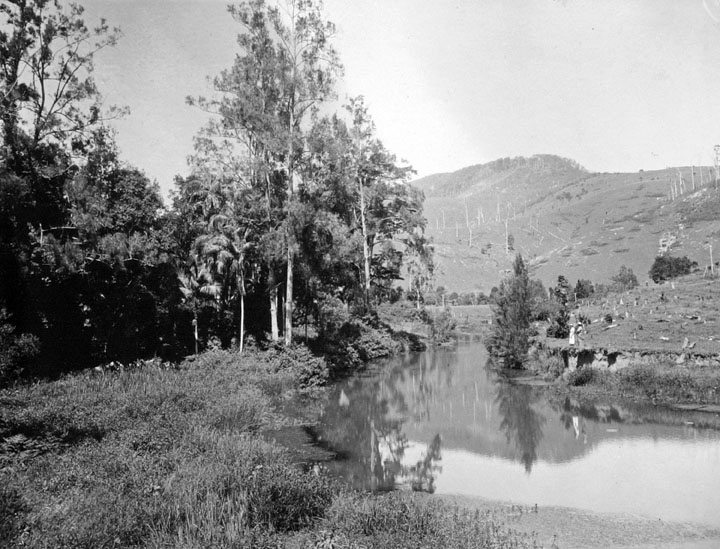
View over Currumbin creek c. 1934

The first bridge across the creek was opened in 1926. The road was then known as the Main Ocean Road, later to be upgraded as the Pacific Highway and now known as the Gold Coast Highway.

Dredging has taken place at Currumbin Creek occasionally between 1974–1997 and then on a yearly basis to date. Over the years, over 1,850,000,000 cubic metres (6.5×10^{10} cu ft) of sand has been dredged from Currumbin Creek and used to nourish southern Palm Beach. During 2007, a dredging operation took place at the mouth of the creek, making the bottom of Currumbin Alley very shallow, creating a calm lagoon for families and children to play in. Due to a build-up of sand in the creek mouth, which prevented jet skis travelling from the creek to the ocean, the Gold Coast City Council announced an operation beginning late in 2008 to deepen the mouth and move sand to the nearby Palm Beach so that beach sand reduced by erosion is replaced.

A boardwalk winds through the small Boree Bodalla Mangrove Reserve with two fishing platforms. It is a popular cycling, running, and walking track and is a serene setting along the creek shore.

== See also ==
- List of rivers of Australia § Queensland
