= Currumbin State School =

Primary school in Queensland, Australia

Location
- 6 Philip Street, Currumbin, Queensland, Australia; 28.13889°S 153.47787°E

Information
- Motto: Deeds not only words
- Established: 1909
- Principal: John Cattoni
- Teaching staff: 77 (2023)
- Years offered: Prep–Year 6
- Enrollment: 1,087 (2023)
- Website: Official site

Currumbin State School is a public co-educational primary school located in the Gold Coast suburb of Currumbin, Queensland, Australia. It is administered by the Queensland Department of Education, with an enrolment of 1,087 students and a teaching staff of 77, as of 2023. The school serves students from Prep to Year 6.

== History ==
The school opened on 29 January 1909, under the name Currumbin Lower State School, but changed to its current name in either 1916 or 1924.

== Demographics ==
In 2023, the school had a student enrolment of 1,087 with 77 teachers (67.8 full-time equivalent) and 34 non-teaching staff (24.3 full-time equivalent). Female enrolments consisted of 467 students and Male enrolments consisted of 620 students; Indigenous enrolments accounted for a total of 7% and 13% of students had a language background other than English.

== Facilities ==
The school's facilities include playgrounds with handball, basketball and netball courts, vegetable gardens, an indoor basketball stadium, a swimming pool, an assembly hall, music rooms, a media centre, and a computer lab.

== See also ==
- Education in Queensland
- List of schools in Gold Coast, Queensland
