= Gold Coast Water =

Allconnex Water is the water and wastewater business for the Gold Coast, Logan and Redland districts. It was established on 1 July 2010 under the Queensland State Government's South East Queensland (SEQ) Water Reform. The reform was initiated to improve the delivery of water services in SEQ and to make this rapidly growing region drought resilient.

The Gold Coast, Logan and Redland councils own the business. Its earnings are therefore invested back into these districts through the three councils. Managing water and wastewater is Allconnex's single focus. The business provides more than 900,000 consumers with water services. These services were previously provided by the local councils.

Allconnex Water's services include:

- Purchasing water from the State Government managed SEQ Water Grid and delivering this water to residents and businesses.
- Collecting, treating and disposing of wastewater.
- Building new infrastructure.
- Managing and maintaining infrastructure and assets, including water supply mains and wastewater networks.
- Operating water and wastewater pumping stations.
- Providing a specialised recycled water service to businesses.
