= Elanora State High School =

Location
- Elanora, Queensland; 28.1297°S 153.4493°E

Information
- Type: Public secondary
- Motto: Aim to Excel
- Established: 1990
- Principal: Rochelle Lewis
- Grades: 7–12
- Enrollment: ~950
- Colours: Jade, navy blue
- Website: elanorashs.eq.edu.au

Elanora State High School is a public secondary school serving the suburb of Elanora on the Gold Coast in Queensland, Australia. Established in 1990, the school provides education for students in Years 7 to 12 and had an enrolment of approximately 950 students as of 2026.

== History ==
Elanora State High School was established in 1990 to service the growing residential areas of Elanora and surrounding southern Gold Coast suburbs. Since its establishment, the school has expanded its academic, sporting, and extracurricular offerings in line with Queensland curriculum requirements and local community needs.

== Programs and facilities ==
The school offers a broad curriculum aligned with the Queensland Certificate of Education (QCE), including academic, vocational, and extracurricular programs. Facilities include specialist learning areas, sporting facilities, and dedicated spaces for student wellbeing and leadership activities.

== Notable alumni ==
- Operator Please, pop rock band formed while members were attending Elanora State High School
- Amandah Wilkinson, musician

== Australian Air Force Cadets ==
No. 213 Squadron Australian Air Force Cadets parade on the school grounds throughout the year.

== See also ==
- List of schools in Queensland
