= Burleigh Head National Park =

National park in Queensland, Australia

- IUCN category II (national park)
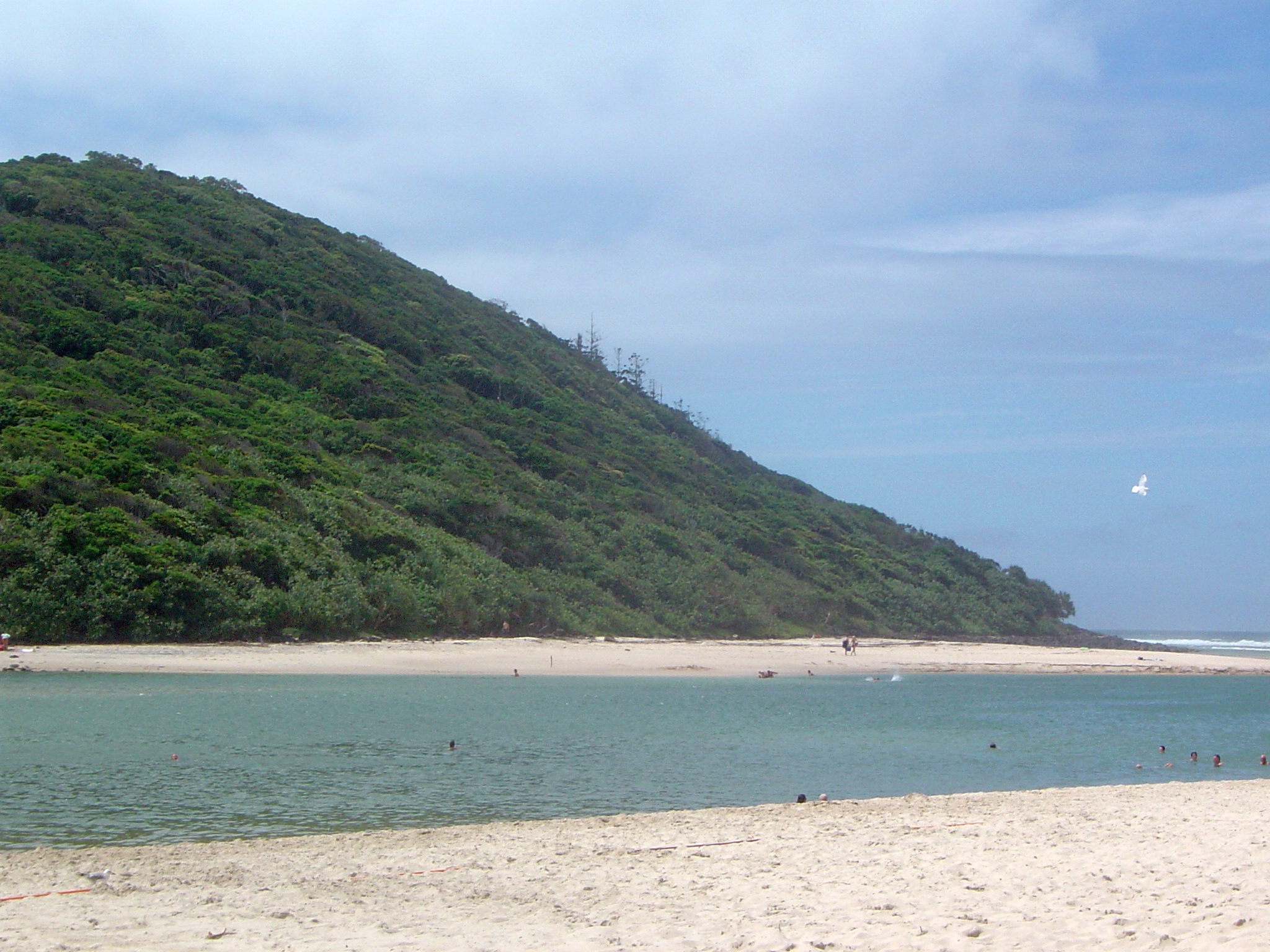
- Headland and Tallebudgera Creek viewed from the south

- Location within Queensland
- Location: Queensland
- Coordinates: 28°5′43″S 153°27′26″E
- Area: 0.30 km^{2} (0.12 sq mi)
- Established: 1994
- Visitors: 1,219,000 (domestic visitors only) (in 2012)
- Governing body: Queensland Parks and Wildlife Service
- Website: http://www.nprsr.qld.gov.au/parks/burleigh-head/

Burleigh Head is a small national park at Burleigh Heads in the City of Gold Coast in South East Queensland, Australia.

== Geography ==
The park is 90 kilometres (56 mi) south of Brisbane. The park is tiny yet it contains a diverse range of habitats. Tallebudgera Creek enters the ocean directly south of the park. No camping is permitted in the park. Access is via the Gold Coast Highway which passes by the park. An information centre is available.

Burleigh Head National Park is a popular place for hiking, walkers and joggers because it located in a cool climate and provides great views. There are two walking tracks in the national park, one climbing the hill to the summit which is about 88 m above sea level, called the Rainforest circuit and another leading around the headland just above sea level called the Ocean view circuit. Watching migrating whales from within the park is another popular activity.

== Landform ==
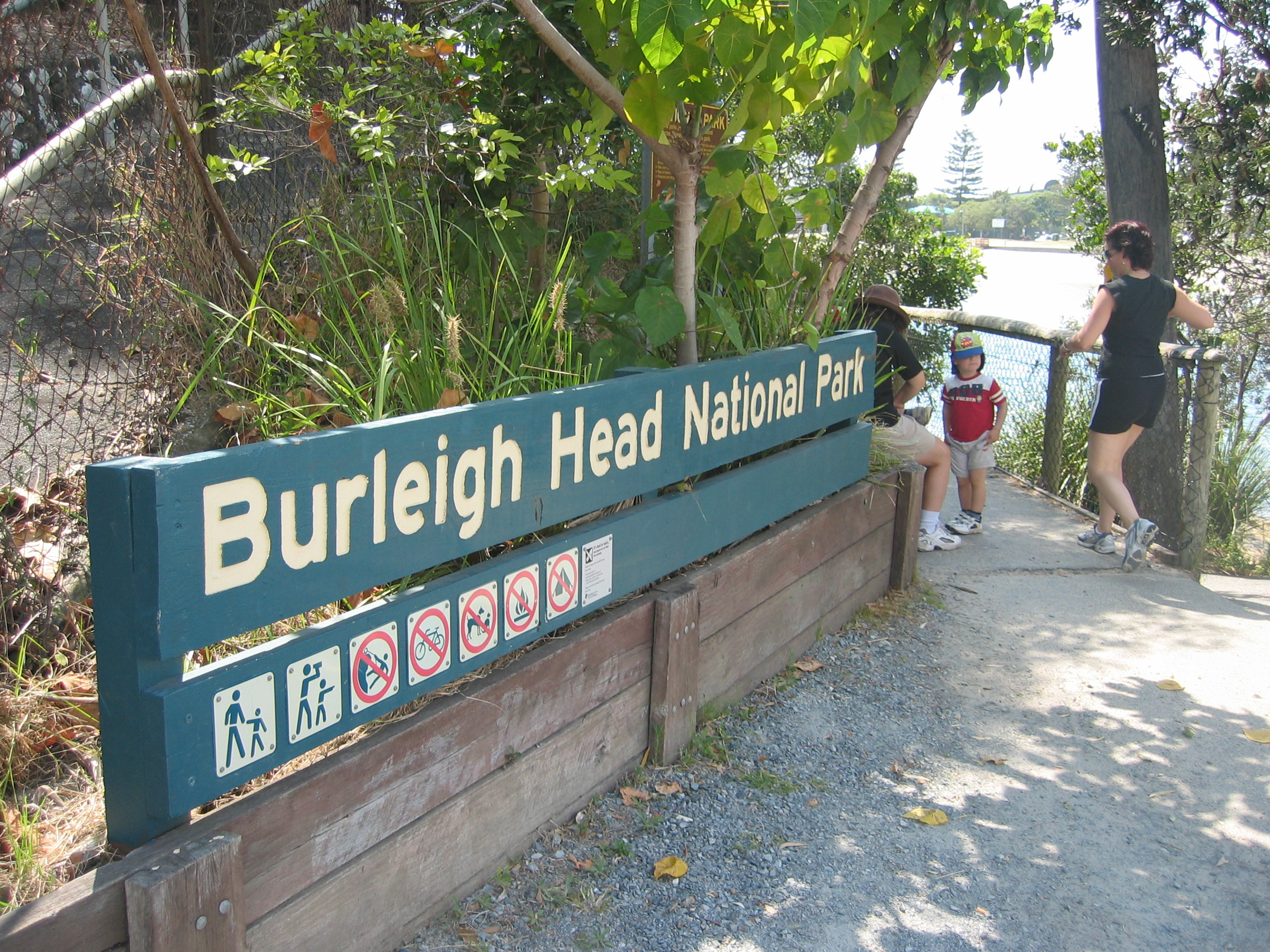
Signage, 2006

The headland has steep sides and is 80 m in height. The formation of the Burleigh headland began between 23 and 25 million years ago. At this time the Tweed Volcano was active. Molten basalt lava from the volcano flowed all the way down the valleys and eroded them all. The valleys were covered in hardened sedimentary rocks before reaching what is now the Burleigh headland. Along Tallebudgera Creek there are rocky platforms and sandy beaches. On the seaside part of the park are black boulders at the base of a cliff. Upstream tidal Tallebudgera Creek has a mangrove environment.

The headland is an important cultural site for the local Aboriginal tribe known as the Minjungbal people.

== Flora ==
The park preserves remnant areas of rainforest and mangrove forests. Western parts are dominated by dry eucalypt forest containing species such as brush box, forest red gum and grey ironbark. On the seaward facing slopes are Swamp she-oak, native hibiscus tree and Pandanus palms. There are also areas of heathland and tussock grassland.

== Fauna ==
The Australian brush-turkey, brahminy kites, sea eagles and koalas can be found in the park. There are also lace monitors, echidnas, mountain brushtail possums, common brushtail possums and common ringtail possums. Rainbow lorikeets are commonly seen feeding on blossoms in the park.

== Walking track ==
The park contains a popular walking track, known as the Oceanview Track, which connects Burleigh Heads and Tallebudgera Creek. The track is sometimes closed following rock falls, which need to be cleared before reopening the track, but other access points to the national park remain open.

== See also ==
- Protected areas of Queensland
