= Tallebudgera Creek Dam =

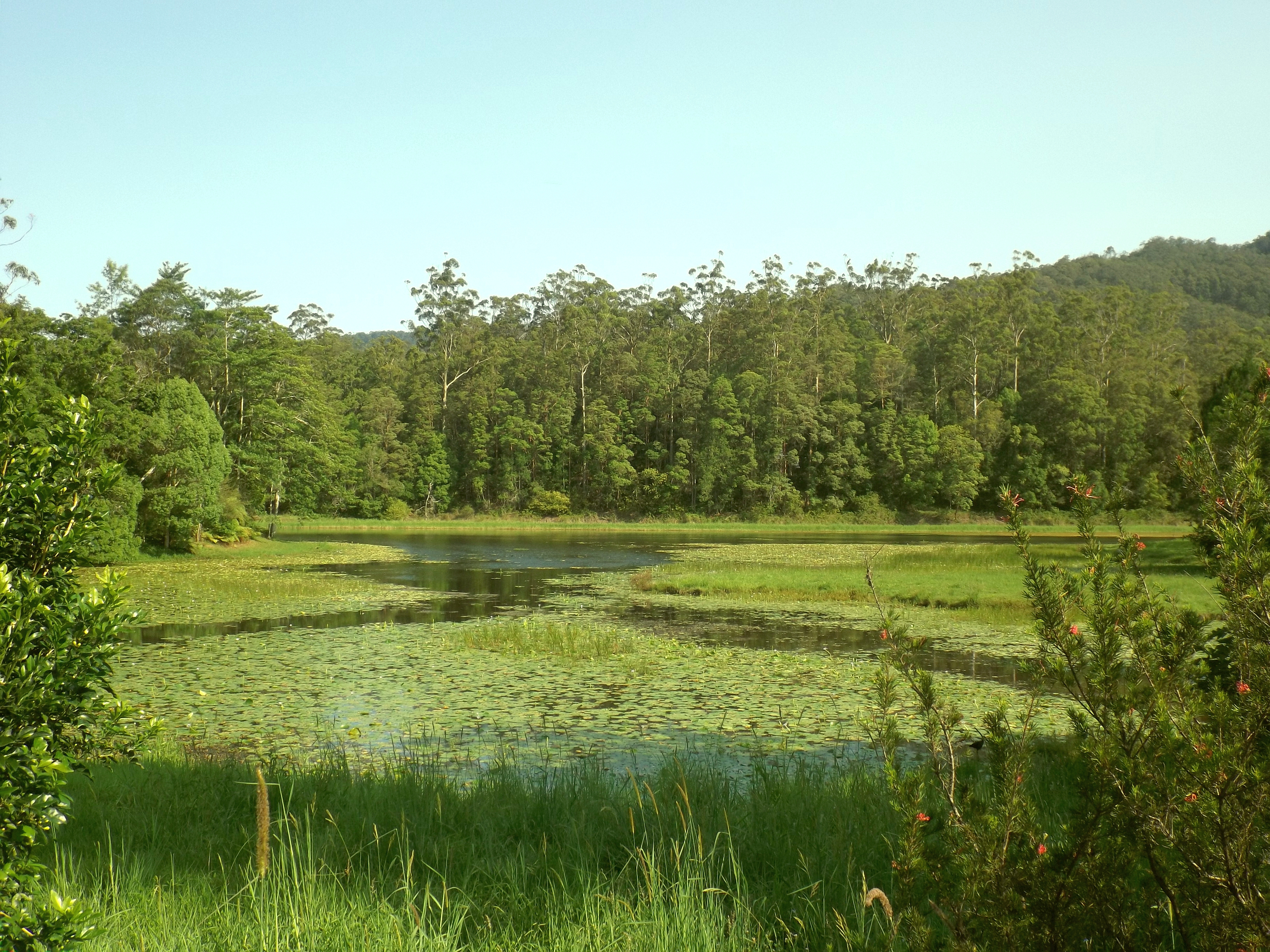
- Waters behind the dam, 2015

- Location of the Tallebudgera Creek Dam in Queensland
- Country: Australia
- Location: South East Queensland
- Coordinates: 28°10′41″S 153°21′36″E
- Purpose: Recreation
- Status: Decommissioned
- Construction began: circa 1940s
- Opening date: circa early 1950s
- Owner: Gold Coast City Council
- Operator: Gold Coast Water

Dam and spillways
- Type of dam: Embankment dam
- Impounds: Tallebudgera Creek

Reservoir
- Surface area: 18 ha (44 acres)

The Tallebudgera Creek Dam, or colloquially Tally Dam, is a decommissioned embankment dam across the upper reaches of the Tallebudgera Creek, in the South East region of Queensland, Australia. The initial purpose of the dam from its establishment until its decommissioning during the 1970s was for the supply of potable water to the Gold Coast region. There is no public access to the dam.

== Location and features ==
The Tallebudgera Dam is approximately 16 kilometres (9.9 mi) south west of the Burleigh Heads.

Designed and constructed by the Coolangatta-Nerang Water Supply Board in the 1940s, construction of the Tallebudgera Dam was finalised in the early 1950s. The dam was one of the earliest water supplies for the region, and provided a constant flow to the intake that was located downstream of the dam. Growth and demand in the region led to the construction of Little Nerang Dam and Mudgeeraba Water Treatment Plant, which then made Tallebudgera Creek Dam obsolete as a water supply. The decommissioning is believed to have occurred in the 1970s and included the removal of the valve house and filling of the valve chambers. It appears that the dam was left for recreation purposes after decommissioning. Following introduction of the Water Act, 2000 (QLD), a Failure Impact Assessment noted the dam design did not comply with the latest safety standards and may over top during a 1 in 50 year average recurrence interval. The Queensland Department of Natural Resources and Water issued advice that the dam was to be upgraded to meet the current dam safety standards. Options considered were to permanently lower the level of the spillway, install flood-triggered gates and removal of the dam. In 2006, after two years of investigation, reports and public consultations, work commenced to upgrade the existing dam to the required standards.

== See also ==
- List of dams in Queensland
