= West Burleigh Store =

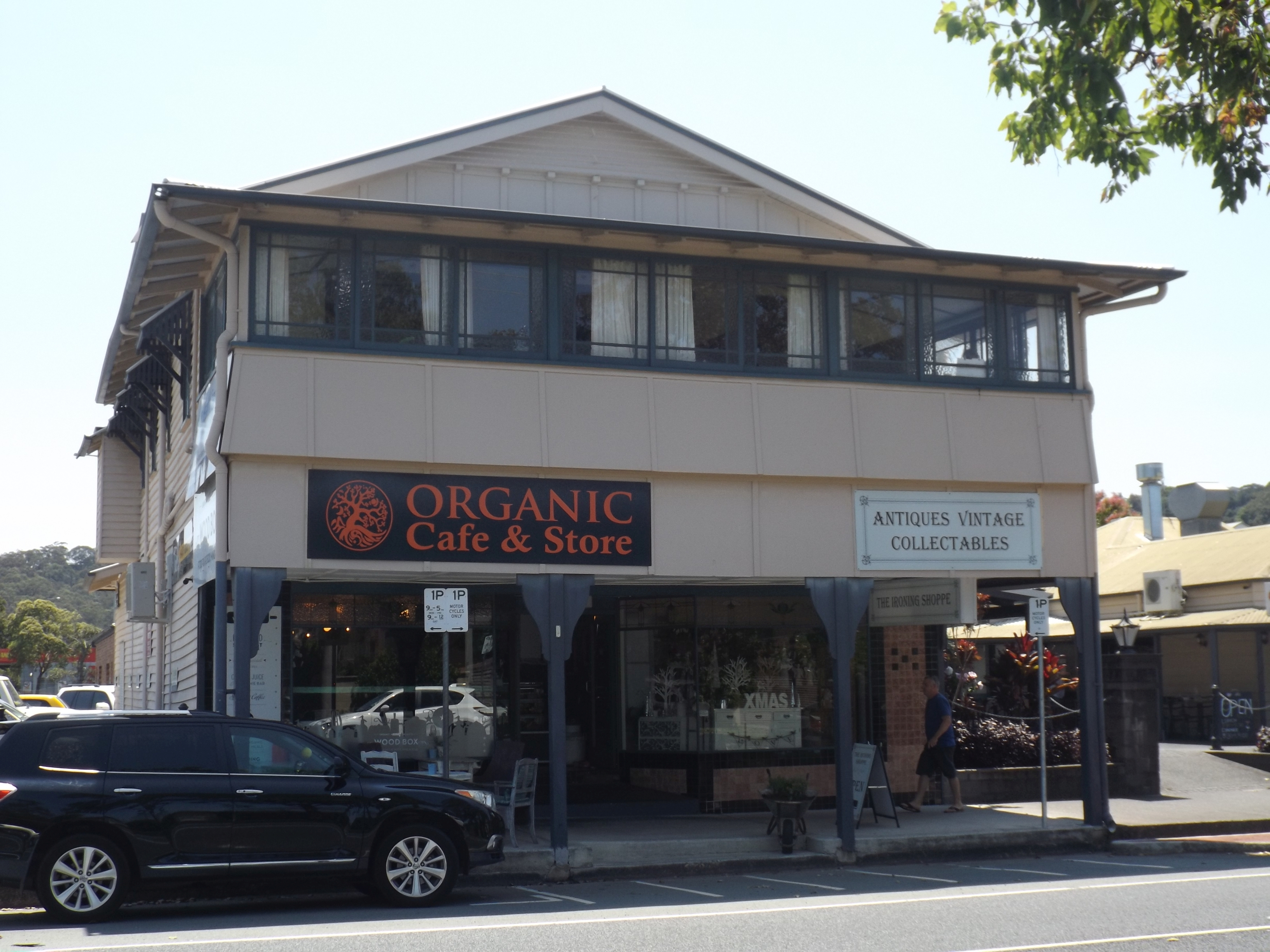
- Building in 2015

- Location within Queensland Location within Australia
- 28.1125°S 153.4412°E
- Location: 33 Tallebudgera Creek Road, Burleigh Heads, Queensland, Australia

History
- Design period: 1919–1930s (interwar period)
- Built: 1935–1935

Queensland Heritage Register
- Official name: West Burleigh Store, Flectcher's Store
- Type: state heritage (built)
- Designated: 5 December 2005
- Reference no.: 602547
- Significant period: 1930s (fabric); 1935–1980s (historical use as General Store)
- Significant components: lead light/s, furniture/fittings, residential accommodation – manager's house/quarters

West Burleigh Store is a heritage-listed general store at 33 Tallebudgera Creek Road, Burleigh Heads, Queensland, Australia. It was built from 1935 to 1935. It is also known as Flectcher's Store. It was added to the Queensland Heritage Register on 5 December 2005.

== History ==
The West Burleigh Store, constructed in 1935 during a property boom on the south coast stimulated by infrastructure development, is a substantial, timber two-storey shop house situated in a commercial precinct close to Tallebudgera Creek about 2.8 kilometres (1.7 mi) southwest of Burleigh Heads. Many of the original features of the store remain intact and it continues to be used as a retail outlet.

Timber getting, agriculture and tourism stimulated the development of the Gold Coast region. Timber getters were among the earliest European inhabitants of the south coast and as late as the 1930s, Dennis' and Woods' sawmills were the stimulus for much of the development of West Burleigh. Closer settlement began in the 1860s, initially in the form of cotton plantations. The Crown Lands Alienation Act (1868) gave further impetus to small scale agriculture and by 1869, farmers and their households, numbering in the hundreds, populated the Mudgeeraba and Tallebudgera districts. With the decline of the cotton industry after the 1860s, these farmers diversified into other crops and dairying. In the decades between the World Wars, bananas and dairying were the major farming industries in the area.

Campers and picnickers were attracted to the area as early as the 1870s by the natural beauty of the south coast beaches. Burleigh Heads was described in the Southern Queensland Bulletin in 1889 (2 March) as "a pretty place, a nice place for a gentleman's residence and a small seaside resort". Development of the coast as a destination for pleasure seekers was inhibited by poor access and inadequate infrastructure. This began to be remedied in 1889 with the opening of the railway to Southport and Nerang. Construction of an extension to Tweed Heads commenced in March 1901. A railway station was built at Booningba (renamed West Burleigh in 1914) about half an hour's buggy ride from Burleigh Heads. The Oyster Bed Hotel (1901) was built close to the station to service the wants and needs of the railway workers. The town's first store (still extant) located next to the hotel is believed to have been built in 1904 by Samuel Andrews. By 1907 the storekeeper, James Herbert, was delivering supplies to campers at Burleigh Heads.

With the greater ownership of motorcars in the 1920s, road access became a key factor facilitating growth. The opening of the Jubilee Bridge (1925) and the coastal road and its extension south in 1926 promoted residential and holiday development along the coast especially at Burleigh Heads. In the 1930s, the construction of bridges over the Coomera River (1930) and Logan (1932) Rivers improved car access to the coast from Brisbane and a building and property boom ensued. Development was further stimulated by the provision of basic infrastructure: electricity was connected to Burleigh Heads in 1930 and extended to West Burleigh in 1934, a reticulated water supply was provided the following year.

The West Burleigh Store and Post Office was completed in February 1935 during the boom period that followed these developments. Alf Fletcher had bought the town's existing general store business from J. Cuddihy in 1928. When the lease on the premises expired, Fletcher was required to move and the premises were taken over by another storekeeper. Fletcher built the new shop, West Burleigh's second general store, about 400 metres (1,300 ft) from the railway station. It was described in the South Coast Bulletin (15 February 1935) as a "large and up to date store" that, with its "modern conveniences", would be a "prominent link in the progress of the area". For its time, the store was a modern example of its type.

Fletcher's new shop incorporated many features that were typical of general stores of the period. General stores were often large due to their profitableness and the increasingly diverse range of goods becoming available to consumers. The bi-coloured timber floor in the store was unusual and this, together with the conservative good quality of the building, reflected the prosperity of Fletcher's business and his expectation of commercial success. The large plate glass windows with a recessed entrance designed to maximize display space were a typical feature of interwar shops. The wooden box shelving (still extant) lining an inside wall was the recommended method for storing and displaying the increasing variety of packaged goods that were becoming available from the 1920s. These shelves are currently being used to display goods for sale. Counters (no longer extant) surrounded three walls and a large U-shaped display area was located centrally between the counters. Petrol bowsers (no longer extant) were located under the verandah on the footpath. Many shops in the first half of the twentieth century also had on location the shop operator's residence; Fletcher's residence was located above the shop. Fletcher lived there with his parents and after they died, with his wife, Gussy, who he had employed in the shop.

Fletcher operated the shop until his death in 1963 and the store continued to be operated by his widowed wife until the early 1970s. It stocked a wide range of goods including foodstuffs, haberdashery, manchester, clothes, boots, hardware, and building material. A large shed at the rear (extant until the 1980s or early 1990s) held livestock feed. The West Burleigh post office and telephone exchange was also conducted from the store. The post office was a smaller building attached to the northern side of the shop. It is believed that it was removed when the shopping and office complex was built around the shop in the 1980s.

Alf Fletcher was a very well known local identity and his store was a focal point of West Burleigh's social and commercial life. Fletcher's customers were mainly the residents of Burleigh Heads and the farmlands of Tallebudgera, Nerang, Mudgeeraba, and Ingleside. The mailman or the cream and milk trucks that visited the surrounding dairies collected written orders and delivered boxes of goods on their return journeys. On Friday nights, local farm workers cashed their paychecks at Fletchers so they had cash to use at the local hotel. A former pupil of Ingleside State School recalls that Fletcher provided a bag of sweets for each child at the annual school break-up picnics.

The West Burleigh store continued to be operated as a general store until the 1980s when the shopping complex around the store was developed. The ground floor of the shop was divided into two, one side operating as a real estate agent's office and the other as a saddlery. The second floor continued to be used as a residence until 2001. The residence was recently converted to office space.

== Description ==
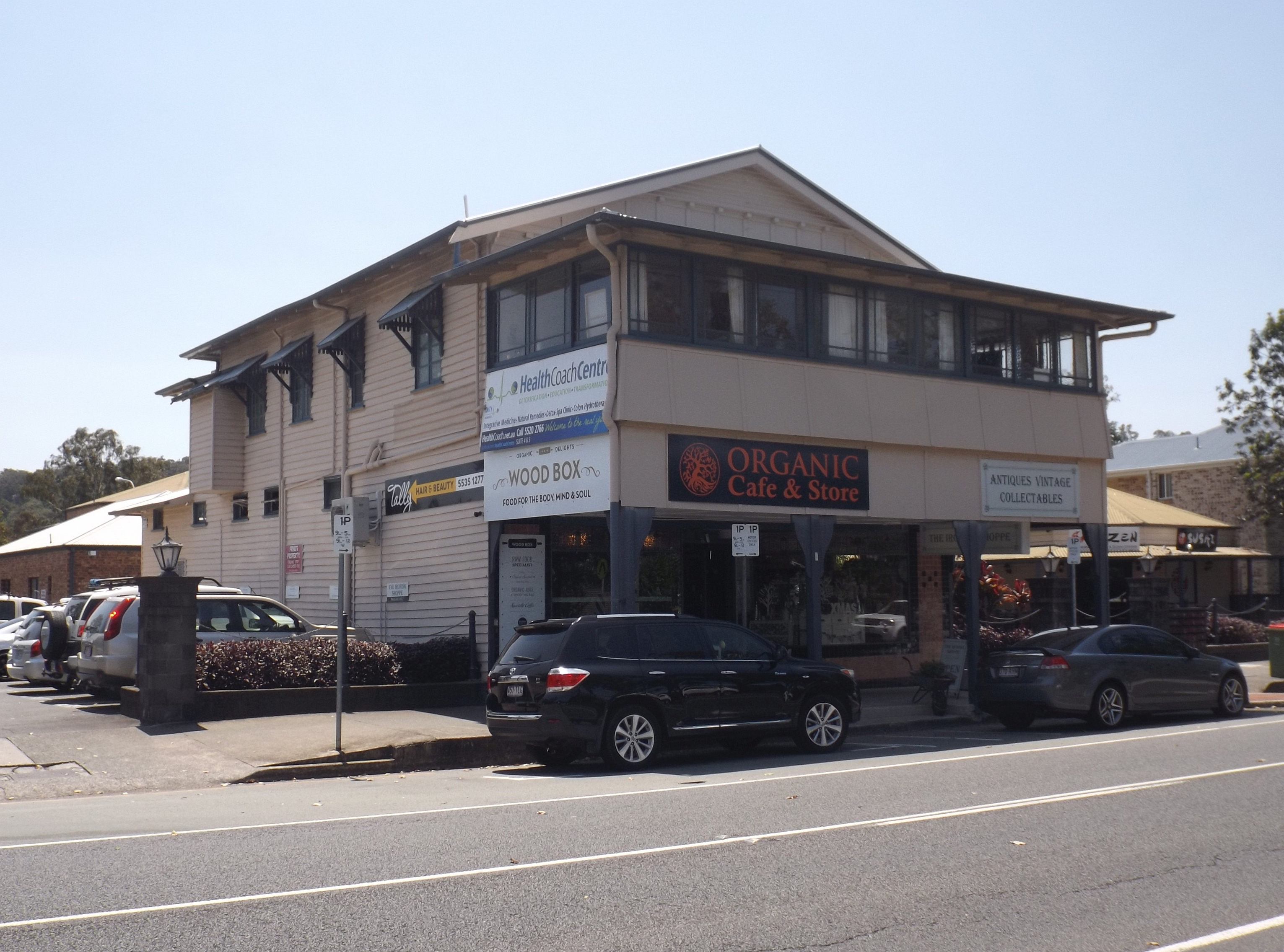
Shop in 2015

The West Burleigh Store is a two-storey structure located in a retail shopping area in West Burleigh. The entrance to the building opens onto the footpath, the same being shaded by an overhanging enclosed verandah. It is about 10 metres (33 ft) wide and extends back from the footpath about 18 metres (59 ft). The verandah is enclosed with fibrous cement sheeting and the rest of the building is clad in weatherboard. A row of timber framed sliding windows runs the full length of the verandah. Each of these comprises a single, large square light bordered with frosted glass. Four square posts support the verandah. The corrugated iron roof is hipped at the rear and gabled at the front. A separate hipped roof covers the verandah.

At the ground level, large plate glass display windows dominate the front of the store. The entrance to the shop is recessed and the plate glass windows continue around the sides of the entrance alcove. A decorative lead-light border made up of red, green and obscure glass runs the full length of the top of the windows. The rest of the shop front is clad with salmon and black ceramic tiles.

The ground floor accommodates a real estate agent's office and a health food shop. The polished timber floor of the shop comprises dark timber planks alternated with light coloured timber. A set of timber box shelves extends the full length of the shop to the ceiling along the southern side. A recently installed counter runs along the opposite side. Commercial refrigerators are positioned along the rear of the shop. The ceiling is made up of fibrous cement sheeting with painted or stained timber battens laid out in a decorative pattern.

Access to the upper storey is gained via a polished timber staircase. This part of the building accommodates offices. The floors of the upper storey are polished timber. Paneled internal doors or lighted French doors are used throughout with frosted glass or slatted wooden transoms. The original brass door and window furniture have been retained in most cases. The joinery is conservative in style and of good quality.

The store is the most prominent structure in a complex of shops and offices dispersed around the large allotment. The commercial precinct surrounding this complex contains a number of historic buildings including West Burleigh's first general store located to the south of the existing West Burleigh store.

== Heritage listing ==
West Burleigh Store was listed on the Queensland Heritage Register on 5 December 2005 having satisfied the following criteria.

The place is important in demonstrating the evolution or pattern of Queensland's history.

The West Burleigh Store provides physical evidence of an important stage in the development of the Gold Coast, one of the State's major tourist destinations. In the early 1930s, improved car access to the coast from Brisbane together with infrastructure development led to a building and property boom on the south coast. The store was completed in 1935 during this period. The erection of a substantial building with a good quality finish at a time when the nation was emerging from economic depression is indicative of the prosperity of the area at this time and storekeeper's expectations of future prosperity. As a substantially intact 1930s general store offering full service and a very wide range of goods and as a shop house, it is also important in demonstrating the evolution of retailing in Queensland.

The place demonstrates rare, uncommon or endangered aspects of Queensland's cultural heritage.

The store is uncommon insofar that intact buildings from this period are becoming increasingly uncommon in the Gold Coast region. It also demonstrates a way of life that has become uncommon, namely the practice where storekeepers combined their shop and place of residence.

The place is important in demonstrating the principal characteristics of a particular class of cultural places.

The store demonstrates many key aspects of 1930s general stores and shop houses. Considered to be a modern store for its era, many of its original fittings survive. The large display windows, recessed front entrance and the box shelves lining an internal wall are all features that were typical of general stores in the interwar period. The residence over the shop continued a long tradition in which a shopkeeper's home was combined with their place of work. This residence is also substantially intact.

The place has a strong or special association with a particular community or cultural group for social, cultural or spiritual reasons.

The store has special association with many former and existing residents of the Gold Coast and for the tourists who visited the area during the decades that it operated as a general store. Built and originally operated by Alf Fletcher until his death in 1963, it continued in family ownership until the early 1970s. It was a focal point of West Burleigh township. Its customers included tourists and the residents of West Burleigh, Burleigh Heads, Tallebudgera, Nerang, Mudgeeraba, and Ingleside. Fletcher and his general store were very well known in the district.
