= Breaka Burleigh Pro =

The Breaka Burleigh Pro is a surfing competition which has been held annually since 2010 in February at Burleigh Heads, Queensland, Australia. It is sponsored by Breaka Flavoured Milk. It features an Association of Surfing Professionals 6-Star rated Women's event and a 4-Star Men's event.

In the 2010 Men's event, Taj Burrow took the championship, and he won again in 2011. Julian Wilson won in 2012. Owen Wright won it in 2013

In the 2013 Women's event, the first year an event was offered for women, the winner was 22-year-old Sally Fitzgibbons.
