= Burleigh Heads, Queensland =

Burleigh Heads
- Suburb
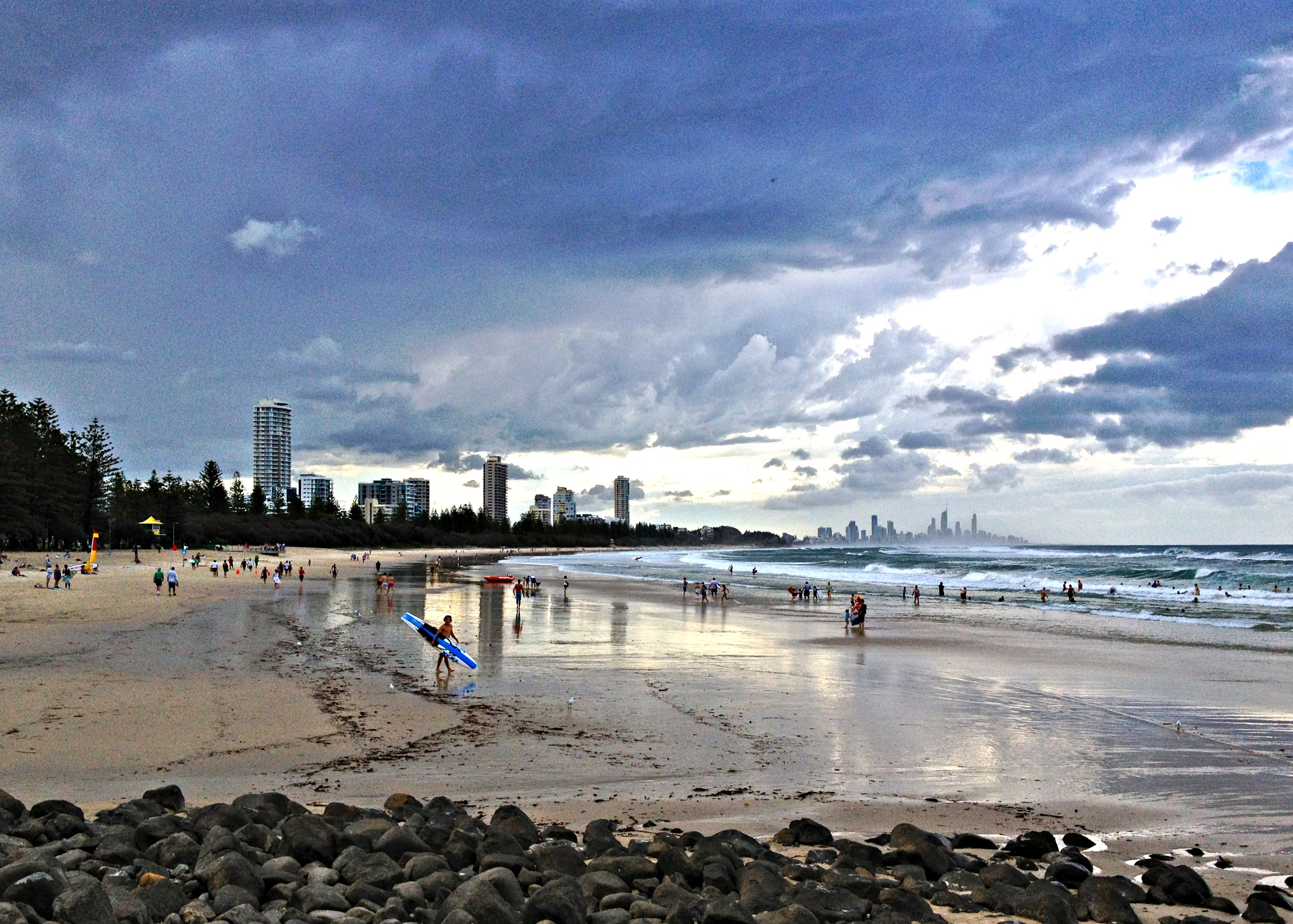
- A beach in Burleigh Heads with high rise developments further in the background

- Interactive map of Burleigh Heads
- Coordinates: 28.1038°S 153.4355°E
- Country: Australia
- State: Queensland
- City: Gold Coast
- LGA: Gold Coast City
- Location: 13.4 km (8.3 mi) S of Surfers Paradise; 18.8 km (11.7 mi) S of Southport; 87.9 km (54.6 mi) SSE of Brisbane; 19 km (12 mi) NW of Tweed Heads

Government
  - State electorate: Burleigh
  - Federal division: McPherson

Area
  - Total: 10.2 km^{2} (3.9 sq mi)
- Elevation: 9 m (30 ft)

Population
  - Total: 10,572 (2021 census)
  - Density: 1,036/km^{2} (2,684/sq mi)
- Time zone: UTC+10:00 (AEST)
- Postcode: 4220
Suburbs around Burleigh Heads
Varsity Lakes	Burleigh Waters	Miami
Reedy Creek	Burleigh Heads	Coral Sea
Tallebudgera Valley	Tallebudgera	Palm Beach; Elanora

Burleigh Heads is a coastal suburb in the City of Gold Coast, Queensland, Australia. It is a popular beach and surfing location. In the 2021 census, Burleigh Heads had a population of 10,572.

== Geography ==
Burleigh Head is a cape (28.0916°S 153.4591°E) jutting into the Coral Sea at the northern mouth of Tallebudgera Creek. Rising to a height of 80 metres (260 ft), Burleigh Head is a prominent local landmark. Burleigh Beach facing the Coral Sea commences at Burleigh Head and extends north (28.0881°S 153.4531°E).

The suburb has two distinct parts. The north-eastern part of the suburb is a narrow coastal area bounded to the north-east by the Coral Sea and includes Burleigh Head. The south-western part then extends inland along Tallebudgera Creek.

The centre of the Burleigh beach area is James Street (28.0892°S 153.4505°E), which consists of cafes, delis, hairdressers, retailers, chemists, restaurants and charity stores.

Koala Park is a neighbourhood in the north-east of the suburb (28.0983°S 153.4525°E). It is a residential area alongside Tallebudgera Creek that is surrounded by bushland consisting of Burleigh Head National Park, Burleigh Ridge Park, Ocean Parade Bush Reserve and Tallebudgera Creek Conservation Park.

West Burleigh is a neighbourhood (a former township) in the south-west of the suburb (28.1105°S 153.4338°E). It has shopping and a small industrial area.

=== Geology ===
The area of Burleigh Head was formed between 20 and 23 million years ago from molten lava due to numerous eruptions of Mount Warning. Flowing lava reached the shore in the area to form Burleigh headland and Point Danger. Geological processes that shaped the region resulted in a variety of different rock types, influencing the landscape, vegetation types and the animals they sustained. Queensland University geologists and students began coming to the area to collect specimens in the 1920s.

=== Ecology ===
Burleigh Headland is part of a wildlife corridor connecting coastal forests south to the Queensland New South Wales border ranges. Burleigh Ridge Park Reserve has a diverse habitat due to its geology. Conservation of the area has preserved many local plants that indigenous people would have used over 200 years ago. There are Eucalypt forest species favoured by Koalas. Other native wildlife include flying foxes, gliders and over 60 bird species.

== History ==
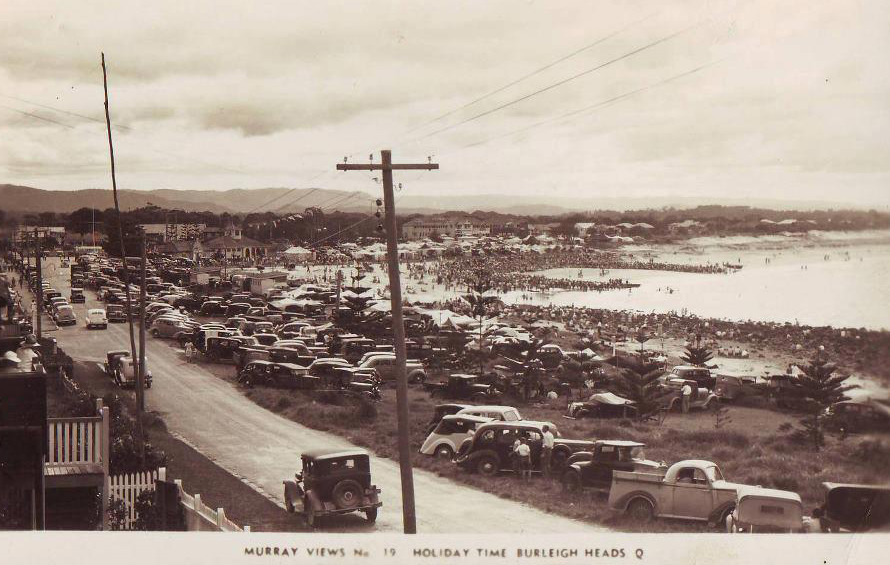
A 1940s postcard of Burleigh Heads

Indigenous Australians inhabited the area of Burleigh Heads for thousands of years prior to European settlement.

In 1840, James Warner was commissioned to survey the coastline near Moreton Bay. Warner named the headland Burly Head because of its massive appearance but the spelling was corrupted to Burleigh Head over time.

The town of Burleigh (centred at 28.0911°S 153.4528°E) was surveyed by on 18 November 1871 by surveyor G.L. Pratten. On 27 May 1872 the Queensland Government announced the sale of town lots in Burleigh would take place on 2 July 1872 at the Lands Office in Beenleigh. On offer were 65 suburban lots ranging from 1 to 3.5 acres (0.40 to 1.42 ha) and 19 country lots ranging from 5 to 27 acres (2.0 to 10.9 ha) on or near Tallebudgera Creek. On 2 April 1873 at the Lands Office in Beenleigh a further 40 suburban lots mostly about 1 acre (0.40 ha) were offered for sale.

By 1873, the township had been surveyed, a number of the allotments sold and a track created connecting Burleigh Heads to Nerang. References to its magnificent beach were starting to appear and reports in newspapers suggested that Burleigh Heads' natural beauty had the potential to eclipse all other seaside locations in the region. However, despite the eventual sale of all the allotments in the township, by 1885, there was only one accommodation house run by Fredrick Fowler and very few, if any, privately owned houses. Further subdivisions and land sales took place in Burleigh during 1914, 1915, 1930, 1929 and 1947. Development including restaurants and guest houses to support the increasing interest in bathing that took place in the last years of the 19th century and the first of the 20th century. It has been the centre of beach activities and a camping site for many years. The extent of the town's development can be seen in this 1929 map.

On 11 November 1879, the Queensland Government created 74 division of local government which saw Burleigh Heads included in the Nerang Division. On 9 December 1948, as part of a major reorganisation of local government in South East Queensland the Queensland Government replaced ten former local government areas between the City of Brisbane and the New South Wales border with four new local government areas. Burleigh became part of the newly created Town of South Coast along with other coastal towns Southport and Coolangatta.

In January 1884, 278 subdivided allotments of the Burleigh Head North estate were auctioned by John Cameron, auctioneer. A map advertising the auction shows the estate to be fronting the Esplanade and close to Nerang Creek.

The South Coast railway line from Ernest Junction through to Tweed Heads opened in 1903. It passed through Burleigh Heads on a route roughly similar to the present Pacific Highway with Burleigh being served by the Booningba railway station (renamed on 16 April 1915 to West Burleigh railway station) which is located on the western bank of Tallebudgera Creek roughly on the boundary of the present-day suburbs of Burleigh Heads and Tallebudgera (approx 28.1147°S 153.4416°E).

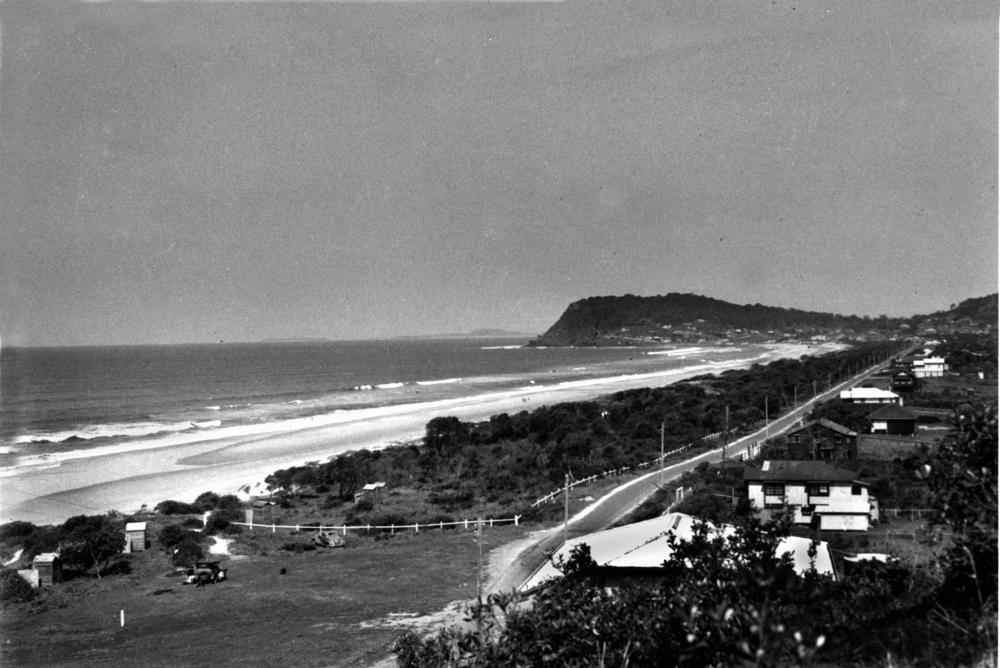
View of Burleigh Heads c.1940

West Burleigh takes its name from the West Burleigh railway station on the former South Coast railway line. The railway station name was assigned by the Queensland Railways Department on 16 April 1915. The railway station had previously been named Booningba, an Aboriginal name meaning place of the echidna.

Burleigh State School opened in Tabilban Street on 19 March 1917 with 11 students. The school building soon became inadequate for the growing number of students. The headmaster Frederick Perrett proposed that the school be "temporarily" moved to the recently built Church of England Hall. This move was approved and school began in the church hall on 25 January 1927. On 16 July 1927, the school was renamed Burleigh Heads State School. After eight years in "temporary" accommodation, on 30 August 1935, the school moved permanently to its current site.

On Sunday 22 August 1926, Bishop Henry Le Fanu dedicated a wooden Anglican church hall in Burleigh Heads. The Burleigh Heads State School occupied the hall from 1927 to 1935. On 10 February 1962, Archbishop Reginald Halse dedicated a new brick church as the War Memorial Church of St John the Evangelist. It was consecrated in 1971.

Methodism commenced in Burleigh Heads when Reverend J. Bean held services on the beach in 1923, which were discontinued owing to the noise of the surf, in favour of using a number of private homes and other venues such as Fradgley's open-air theatre. Land on the corner of West Burleigh Road and Burleigh Street was purchased in September 1925 on behalf of the Methodist Church in Queensland; it was formerly the site of the Smith's boarding house Burleigh Lodge which was relocated to Marine Parade (now The Esplanade) where it became the Burleigh Hotel. On Sunday 23 December 1928, a Methodist church was officially opened by Reverend James H. Heaton (President of the Methodist Conference). It was 40 by 26 feet (12.2 by 7.9 m) and situated "on a hill with a beautiful outlook over the ocean". The church was built by Mr Sommerville. The pulpit and communion rail were erected by friends in memory of Reverend Henry Youngman; it was designed by architect Lange Powell and constructed by James Campbell & Sons. A stump-capping ceremony for a church hall was held on 20 December 1952.

The first Presbyterian services in Burleigh Heads were held in the house Braemar, the home of Mrs Margaret Black in Park Avenue in 1926. Land in West Street was purchased in October 1928 for the Presbyterian Church of Queensland with the financial assistance of William Robert Black and the leadership of Alexander Mayes. On Saturday 26 October 1928, a Presbyterian Church was officially opened by Reverend G. L. Shirreffs (Moderator of the Presbyterian Church in Queensland). It was on an elevated site overlooking the town.

The commercial centre of James and Conner Streets was established by the 1930s and began to boom during the postwar period. The landmark row of Norfolk Pines along the Burleigh esplanade were planted by local shopkeepers, the Justins family, in 1934.

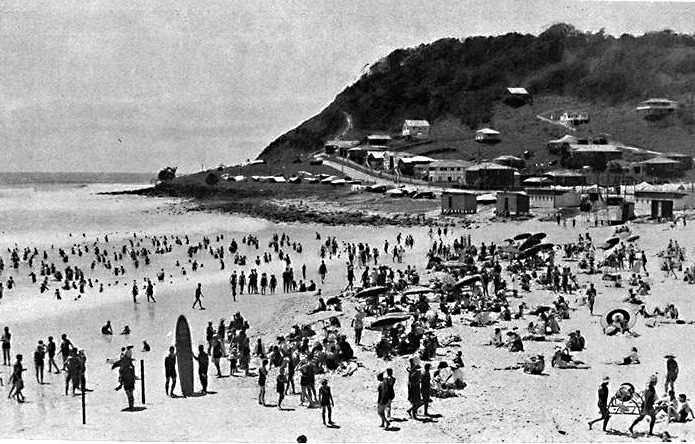
Burleigh Heads beach, 1930s

The De Luxe Theatre was built by William Fradgley and opened on Wednesday 15 October 1930. It showed silent movies initially with its first "talkie" on Wednesday 9 September 1931, featuring the movies Paradise Island, Hot Curves and a Mickey Mouse cartoon. It was also used for Catholic church services prior to the construction of the Infant Saviour Roman Catholic Church. World War II was a boom time for the cinema as there were camps for both Australian and American army personnel in the area. In February 1945 the Thams Brothers (Lorenz and Charles Thams who owned and operated other cinemas on the Gold Coast) leased the De Luxe, purchasing it in 1950. Cyclonic winds damaged the cinema on Friday 19 and Saturday 20 February 1954, and it needed to be rebuilt. The Thams sold the cinema on 29 June 1966. The building gradually became derelict. It was converted in the 1970s into the Old Burleigh Theatre Arcade, with shops, restaurants and offices. In August 2019, the complex and an adjacent building were sold for about $18.5 million, which the short-term intention of continuing its current operations but with a long-term view of redeveloping the site.

On 8 January 1933, the foundation stone of the Infant Saviour Catholic Church was laid by Archbishop James Duhig on land which had been purchased in 1926 on the south-western corner of Connor Street and Park Avenue (28.0904°S 153.4513°E). On Sunday 27 January 1935, the church was officially opened by Duhig. It was designed in Spanish Mission style by Brisbane architect John Patrick Donoghue and was built using brick and fibro cement with a "handsome facade" of rough-cast rendered cement decorated with cordoba tiles. The building was 91 by 54 feet (28 by 16 m) and could seat 600 people, using the verandahs for additional seating to accommodate for the seasonal influx of tourists (Burleigh already being a popular holiday destination). It was built by Mr B. Robinson and cost about £3,000. It included a wooden dance floor as it was planned to build another larger church building on the site later and use the first church as a hall. On 15 August 1999, Archbishop John Bathersby conducted the final mass in the church. The building was sold and relocated to the Heritage Estate Winery (now the Hampton Estate Winery) at 62 Bartle Road, Tamborine Mountain, where it was restored for use as a restaurant and reception centre.

The Infant Saviour Primary School opened on 6 February 1935 on the verandahs of the Infant Saviour Catholic Church. The school closed in 1942 because of fears of a Japanese invasion during World War II. It was reopened on 27 January 1953 by the Missionary Franciscan Sisters of the Immaculate Conception and closed in 1973 when it was replaced by Marymount Catholic Primary School.

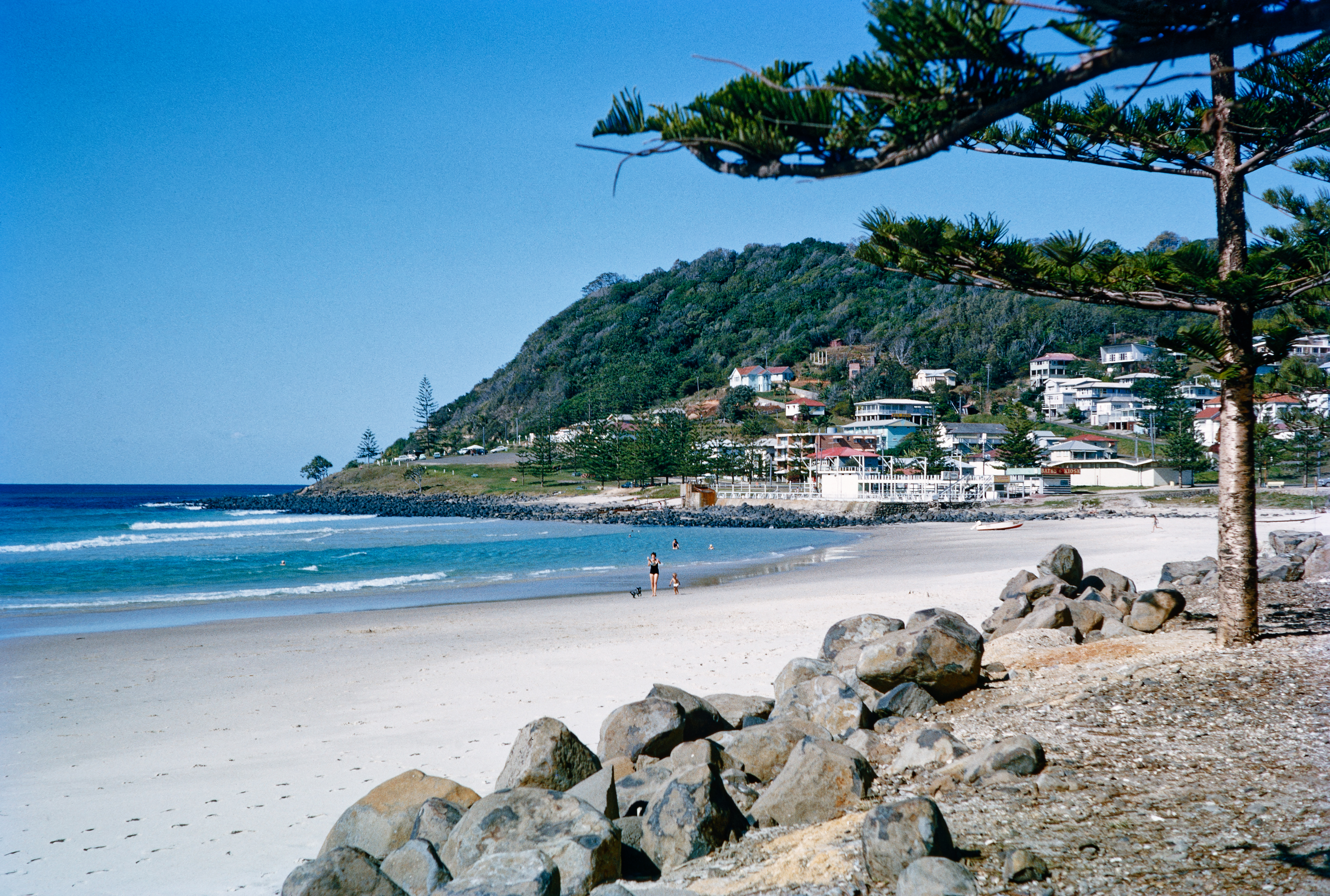
Burleigh Heads beach, looking towards the headland, 1965

The northern section of Burleigh Beach appears to have been subdivided by the mid-1950s, but was the site of extensive sand mining in the following decades. The broad beachfront park is a legacy of that activity.

Koala Park residential area was developed in the 1960s.

Burleigh State High School opened on 1 January 1963. It was renamed South Coast District State High School before being renamed again to Miami State High School.

In 1967, the Methodist and Presbyterian churches at Burleigh Heads began discussions on co-operation between the two churches, culminating on the official creation of the Methodist-Presbyterian Co-operation Church on 2 July 1972. In 1973 the Presbyterian church building in West Street was sold to the Christian Science Church. On 6 April 1975 other congregations in Surfers Paradise, Palm Beach, Coolangatta, Isle of Capri, Mermaid Beach, Mudgeeraba, Tallebudgera and Currumbin joined the Burleigh Heads's co-operation to establish the Gold Coast Co-operative Parish. On Saturday 6 December 1975 the Methodist and Presbyterian churches were physically united as the Burleigh Heads Co-operative Church in a new two-storey church building on Burleigh Street on the site of the former Methodist hall, adjacent to the former Methodist Church (which then became the new church's hall). On the creation of the Uniting Church in Australia in 1977, the Burleigh Street church became Burleigh Heads Uniting Church. The "new" 1975 church soon became too small as the permanent and holiday population of Burleigh Heads grew, and on 16 September 1990 the new Church on the Hill was opened. The former Methodist church/hall was then relocated to Coominya where it is used as a private residence.

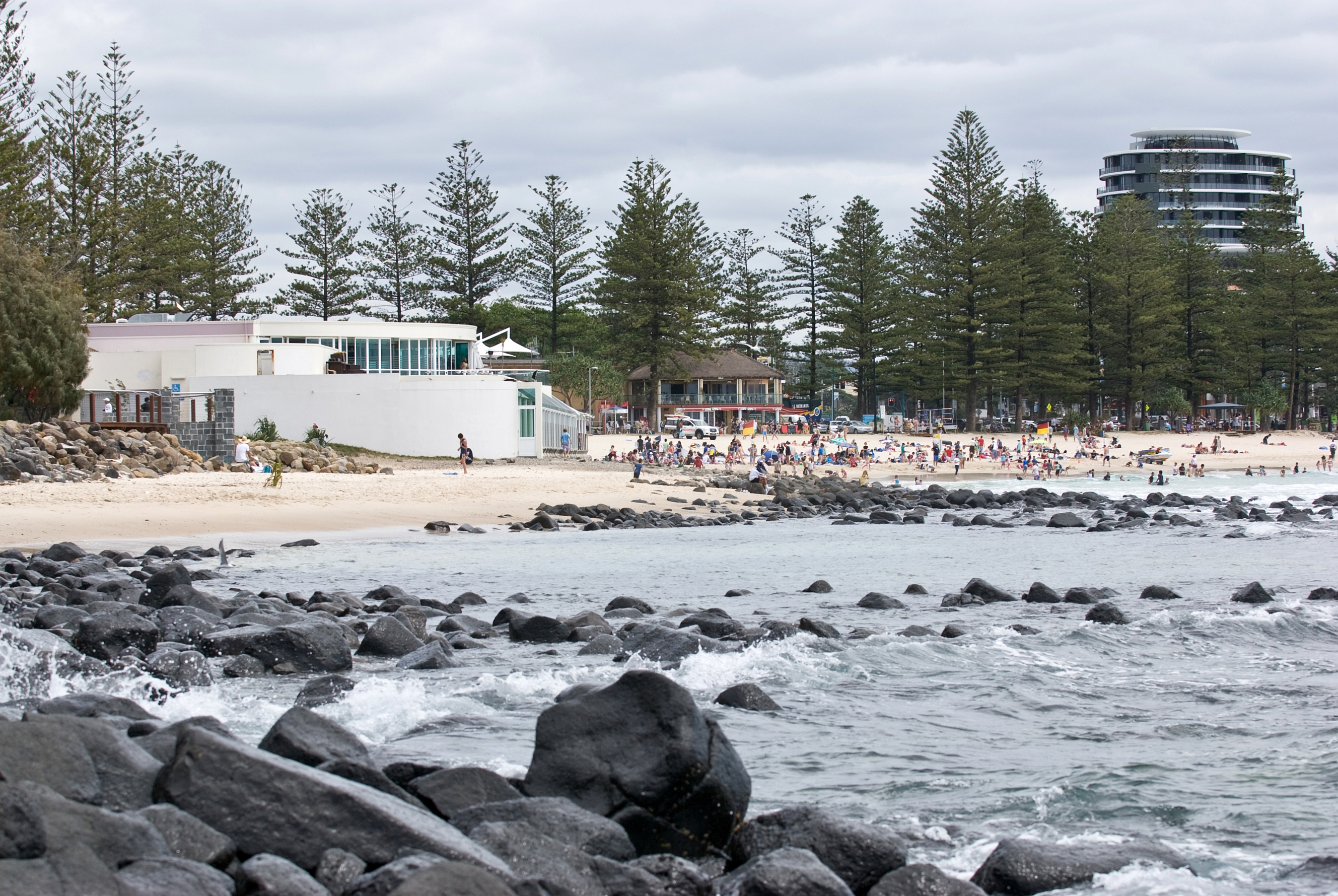
Burleigh Heads beach, 2008

Due to rising student numbers at the Burleigh Heads State School, a separate Burleigh Heads Infants School opened on 23 January 1978. Falling student numbers resulted in the infants closing on 3 July 1989 to be re-integrated back into the main school.

The Burleigh Library opened in 1993 and had a major refurbishment in 2010.

Historical population
Year	Pop.	±%
2006	7,606	—
2011	9,188	+20.8%
2016	10,077	+9.7%

== Demographics ==
In the 2011 census, Burleigh Heads had a population of 9,188, 52.2% female and 47.8% male. The median/average age of the Burleigh Heads population is 40 years of age, 3 years above the Australian average. 69.3% of people living in Burleigh Heads were born in Australia. The other top responses for country of birth were New Zealand 6.8%, England 4.6%, Brazil 0.9%, Scotland 0.8%, South Africa 0.6%. 85.2% of people speak English as their first language 0.8% Portuguese, 0.5% Italian, 0.4% German, 0.4% Japanese, 0.3% French.

In the 2016 census, Burleigh Heads had a population of 10,077.

In the 2021 census, Burleigh Heads had a population of 10,572.

== Heritage listings ==
Burleigh Heads has a number of heritage-listed sites, including:

- Burleigh Heads Rotary Classification Pole, Alby Adams Park, Gold Coast Highway
- Grave of Emily and Thomas West, George Street Central (corner Tweed Street)
- Burleigh Heads Tourist Park and Caretakers Residence, 28 and 36 Goodwin Terrace
- former De Luxe Theatre (The Old Burleigh Theatre Arcade), 64 Goodwin Terrace
- Burleigh Heads Library Gardens, Park Avenue
- Bora Memorial Rock, Sixth Avenue (corner Pacific Highway, Jebbribillum Bora Park)
- West Burleigh Store, 33 Tallebudgera Creek Road
- Norfolk Pines Burleigh Foreshore, The Esplanade (south of Third Avenue) and Goodwin Terrace
- David Fleay Wildlife Park, 244–252 West Burleigh Road

== Transport ==
Gold Coast Highway travels along the eastern side of the suburb passing through the heart of suburb. Gold Coast highway connects Burleigh Heads with all the coastal suburbs on the Gold Coast. West Burleigh Road (State Route 80) eventually becomes Reedy Creek Road after an intersection in front of Stocklands Burleigh Heads, connects the heart of the suburb with the Pacific Motorway and Varsity Lakes railway station.

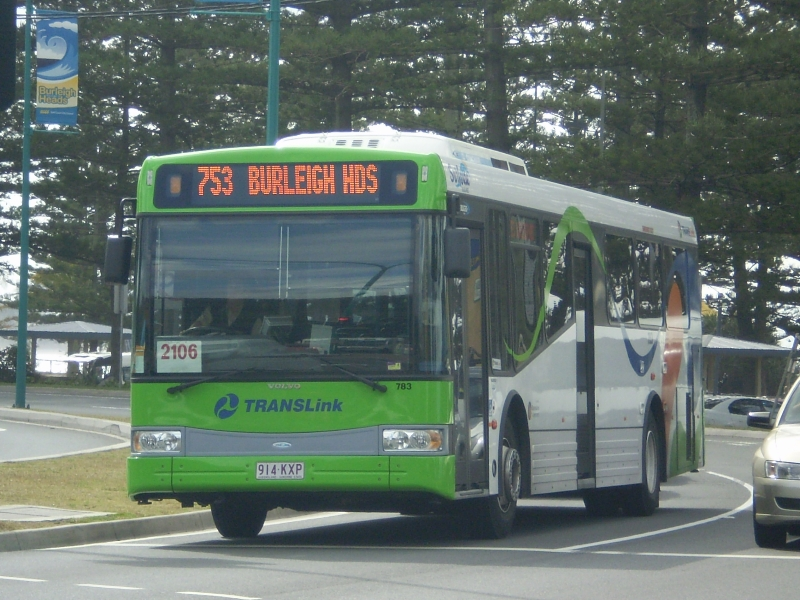
A Translink bus along the Gold Coast Highway, Burleigh Heads

Burleigh Heads is serviced by Translink services, a subsidiary of the Department of Transport and Main Roads, who operate an integrated ticketing system throughout South East Queensland. Burleigh Heads Bus stop is the main bus stop in the suburb, located on the Gold Coast Highway. A bus service connects Burleigh Heads with the Gold Coast Airport, Tweed Heads, Robina and Broadbeach

Major construction commenced in July 2022 to extend the existing G:link tram to Burleigh Beach from Broadbeach, expected to be completed late 2025.

== Education ==
Burleigh Heads State School is a government primary (Early Childhood to Year 6) school for boys and girls at 1750 Gold Coast Highway (28.0868°S 153.4493°E). In 2018, the school had an enrolment of 531 students with 47 teachers (38 full-time equivalent) and 44 non-teaching staff (29 full-time equivalent). It includes a special education program.

There are no secondary schools in Burleigh Heads. The nearest government secondary schools are Miami State High School in neighbouring Miami to the north and Elanora State High School in neighbouring Elanora to the south-east.

Primary and secondary Catholic education is available at Marymount College in neighbouring Burleigh Waters.

== Amenities ==
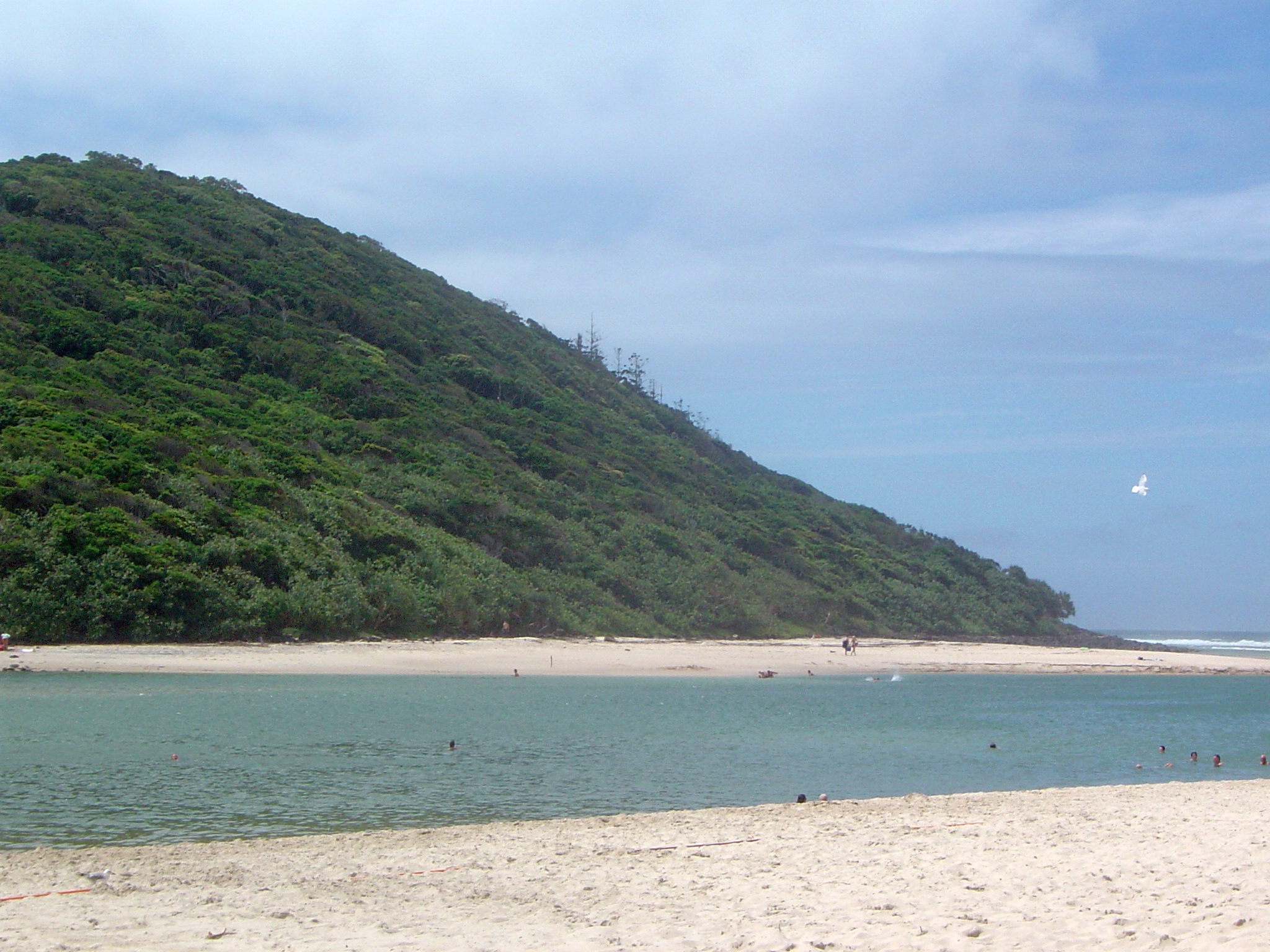
Burleigh Heads and Tallebudgera Creek from south of the headland

The Gold Coast City Council operates a public library and public hall in Park Avenue (corner of Ocean Street, 28.0906°S 153.4524°E). Burleigh Heads Library is on the ground floor and Fradgley Hall is on the upper floor.

St John the Evangelist Anglican Church is at 14 Park Avenue (28.0904°S 153.4499°E). It holds services on Wednesday and Sunday.

Infant Saviour Catholic Church is at 4 Park Avenue (28.0903°S 153.4508°E). It is part of the Burleigh Heads Catholic Parish within the Archdiocese of Brisbane.

Burleigh Heads Uniting Church is at 2 Burleigh Street (28.0890°S 153.4489°E). It is the amalgamation of the former Methodist and Presbyterian churches in Burleigh Heads as part of the establishment of the Uniting Church in Australia in 1977. The current church building was opened on 16 September 1990.

== Sport and recreation ==
=== Surfing ===
- Stubbies Surf Classic Burleigh Heads 1977–1988
- The Quiksilver Pro is often contested at Burleigh Heads when the surf is not contestable at Kirra or Snapper Rocks.
- The Breaka Burleigh Pro Burleigh Boardriders Single Fin Classic and many other amateur and junior events are also contested each year.
- Professional/World tour Surfers Peter Harris and Jay Thompson

=== Others ===
Sport	Club	Venue
Australian rules football	Burleigh Bombers	Bill Godfrey Oval
Basketball	Burleigh Blades	Tallebudgera Recreation Centre
Bowls	Burleigh Heads Bowls Club	Memorial Park
Boxing	Sanctum Forge Boxing Gym; Opetaia Boxing Club	Kortum Drive; Hutchinson Street
Brazilian Jiu Jitsu	Gracie Barra Burleigh Heads; Full Metal Jiu Jitsu; Southside BJJ	Kortum Drive; Ramly Drive; Calabro Way
Cricket	Burleigh Bullsharks	Bill Godfrey Oval
Golf	Burleigh Golf Club	Burleigh Golf Course
Muay Thai / Kickboxing	Boonchu Muay Thai Gym	Kortum Drive
Rugby league	Burleigh Bears	Pizzey Park
Soccer	Burleigh Bulldogs	Pizzey Park
Surf lifesaving	Burleigh Heads SLSC; North Burleigh SLSC	Mowbray Park; Ed Hardy Park
Tennis	Burleigh Heads Tennis Club; Gold Coast Albert Tennis Club	Burleigh Tennis Centre; GCA Tennis Centre
Field hockey	Hockey Burleigh Club	Ken Hunt Park

== Attractions ==
The north-east facing beach is protected by the cape Burleigh Head to the south and offers one of the best swimming, body boarding and surfing beaches on the Gold Coast. A mature stand of Norfolk Island pines – originally planted by the Justins family and reputably some of the earliest planted at the coast – and more recent plantings together totalling some 450 Norfolk Pines; form a backdrop and are home to native birds.

Burleigh Heads' surf break attracts surfers from the Gold Coast and beyond. At the headland of Burleigh, locally known as "The Point", barbecues and cricket matches are held, and spectators can watch the surfers. On Sunday afternoons, local musicians and fire-twirlers often come out to the park beside Burleigh SLSC for a jam and dance session.

Other attractions in Burleigh Heads include:

- David Fleay Wildlife Park (Tallebudgera Creek Road, 28.1078°S 153.4437°E)
- Jebribillum Bora Park (28.07704°S 153.44606°E)
- Burleigh Head National Park

== Events ==
Burleigh Heads State School is home to The Village Markets, A bi-monthly event that promotes local emerging designers and artists.

== See also ==
- List of Gold Coast suburbs
