= Tallebudgera Creek =

Tallebudgera
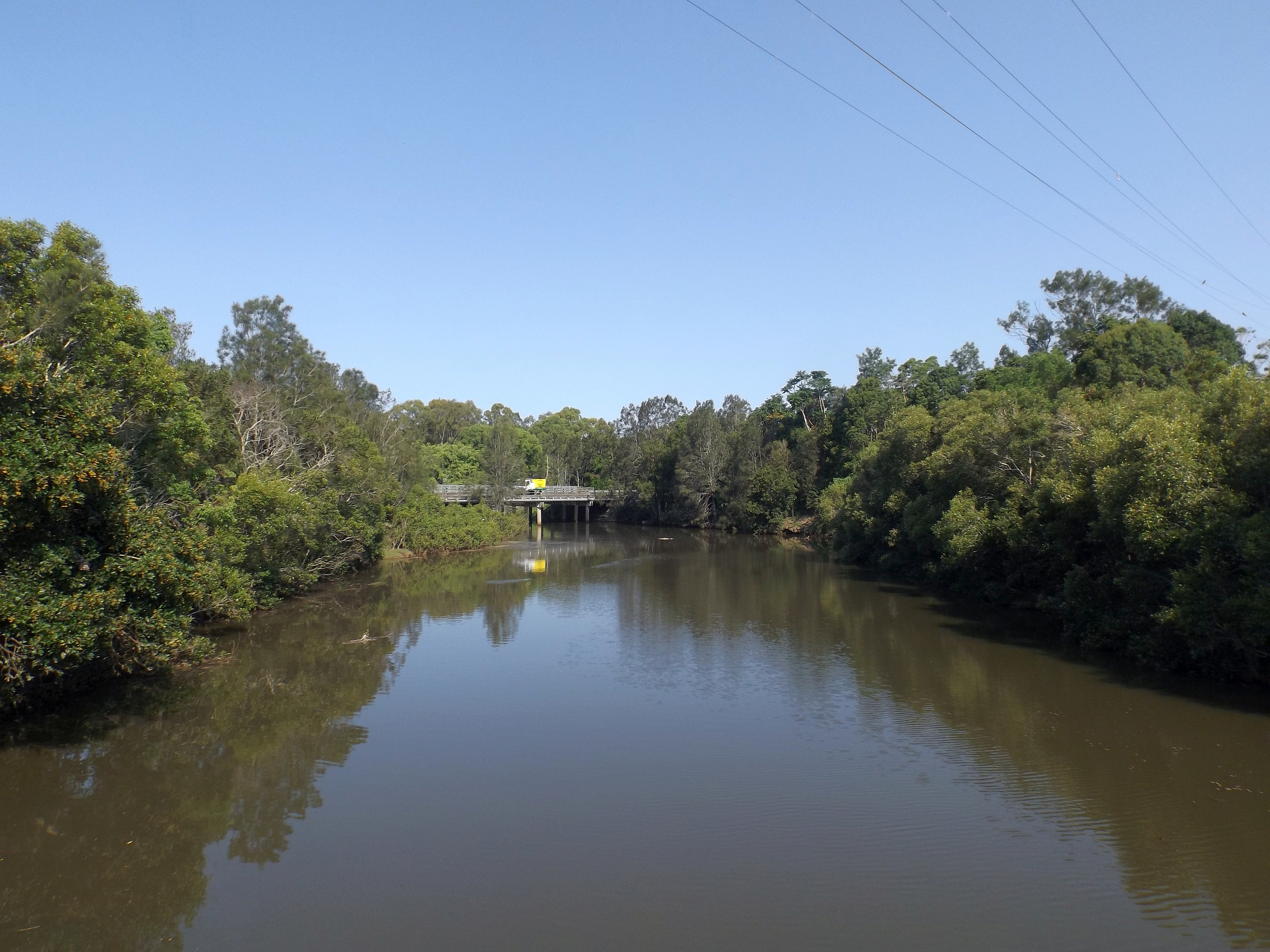
- Waterway at Coplicks Lane in Tallebudgera, 2015

- Location of the Tallebudgera Creek mouth in Queensland
- Etymology: Aboriginal: good fishing

Location
- Country: Australia
- State: Queensland
- Region: South East Queensland
- Local government area: City of Gold Coast

Physical characteristics
- Source: Springbrook Plateau
  - location: Upper Tallebudgera
  - coordinates: 28°13′13″S 153°19′10″E
  - elevation: 100 m (330 ft)
- Mouth: Burleigh Head
  - location: Palm Beach
  - coordinates: 28°5′35″S 153°27′44″E
  - elevation: 0 m (0 ft)
- Length: 25 km (16 mi)
- Basin size: 98 km^{2} (38 sq mi)

Basin features
- Tributaries
  - right: Mount Cougal Creek
- National park: Springbrook National Park

Tallebudgera Creek is a creek in South East Queensland, Australia. Its catchment lies within the Gold Coast local government area and covers an area of 98 square kilometres (38 sq mi). The river is approximately 25 kilometres (16 mi) in length and is known for good fishing.

== Course and features ==
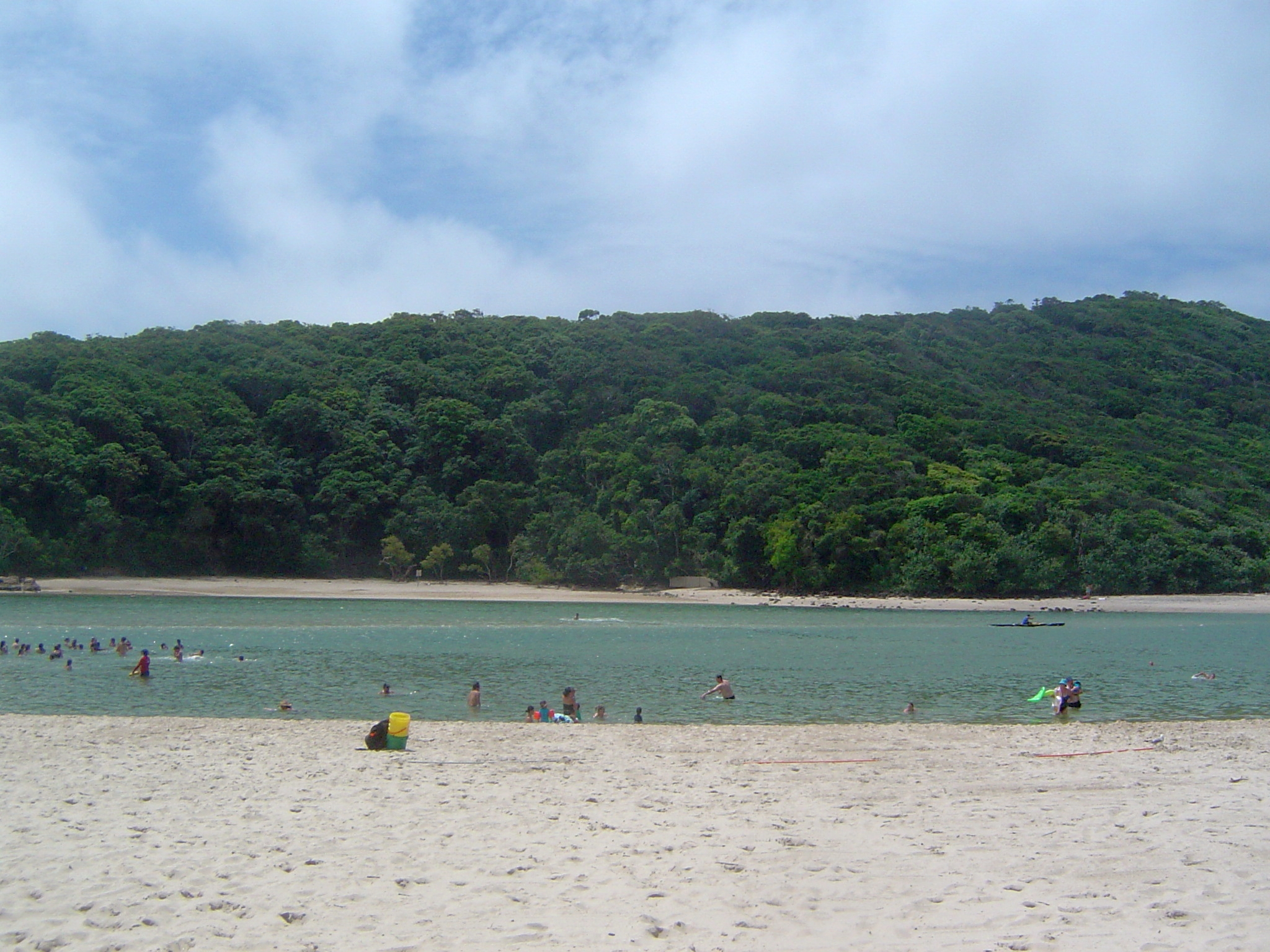
Tallebudgera Creek close to the mouth and Burleigh Heads National Park

Tallebudgera Creek rises from the Springbrook Plateau in the Springbrook National Park, Mt Cougal Section, just north of the New South Wales/Queensland border. The creek flows generally north by east through the Tallebudgera Valley towards Burleigh Heads where it is crossed by the Pacific Motorway and the Gold Coast Highway, before reaching the popular swimming beach on the south side of Burleigh Head National Park and emptying into the Coral Sea. The creek descends 100 metres (330 ft) over its 25-kilometre (16 mi) course. The name Tallebudgera comes from the Yugambeh word "Jalubay-ngagam", which means "dingo's urine".

Tallebudgera Creek is known for good fishing. Bream, flathead, whiting and the bull shark are common species that are found in the creek.

As well as the main creek there is an extensive canal system. It is one of the Gold Coast's three main canal and creek systems, alongside the slightly smaller Currumbin Creek to the south and the much larger Nerang River to the north.

Dredging is carried out yearly in winter and spring to improve creek water quality and replenish sand on nearby Burleigh Beach.

== History ==
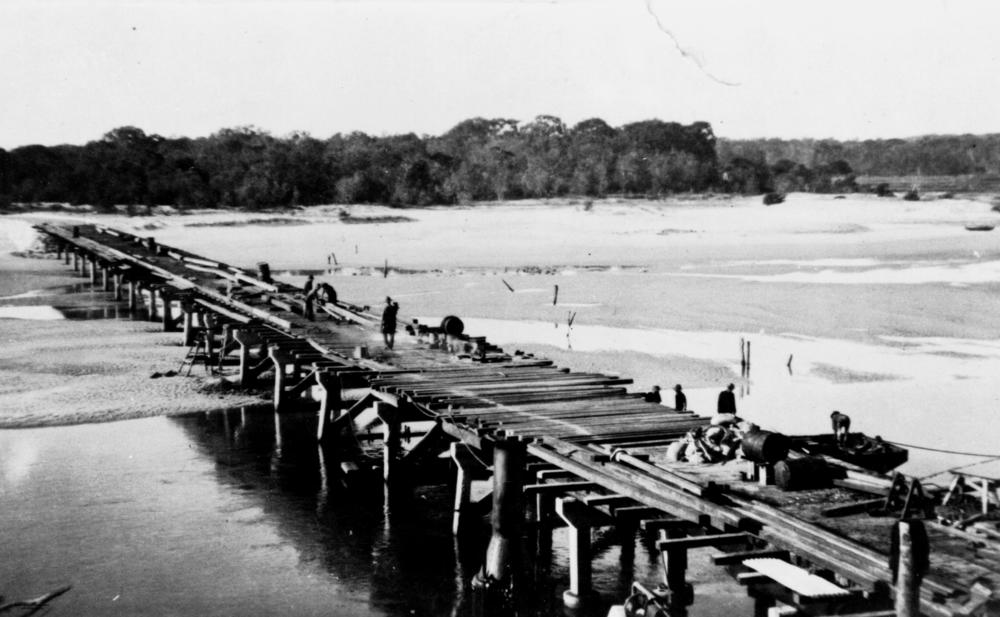
The construction of the bridge in 1926.

The first bridge across the creek was opened in 1926. The road was then known as Main Ocean Road, later upgraded as the Pacific Highway and now known as the Gold Coast Highway.

The Tallebudgera Creek Dam was constructed on the creek in the 1950s as a water supply source for the lower Gold Coast. The dam was decommissioned during the 1970s. It appears that the dam was left for recreation purposes after decommissioning. In 2006, after two years of investigation, reports and public consultations, work commenced to upgrade the existing dam to the required dam safety standards.

The Playroom nightclub opened at the southern end of Tallebudgera Bridge in 1966. A popular local social venue, the club was demolished in 1999 and is now a public carpark for the beach and adjoining fitness camp.

== See also ==
- List of rivers of Australia § Queensland
