= Swamp she-oak =

Swamp she-oak is a common name for several plants and may refer to:

- Allocasuarina paludosa, endemic to southeastern Australia
- Casuarina glauca, endemic to eastern Australia
- Casuarina obesa, native to southwestern Australia
