= 2016 Gold Coast City Council election =

Local elections in Australia

← 2012	19 March 2016	2020 →
- Turnout
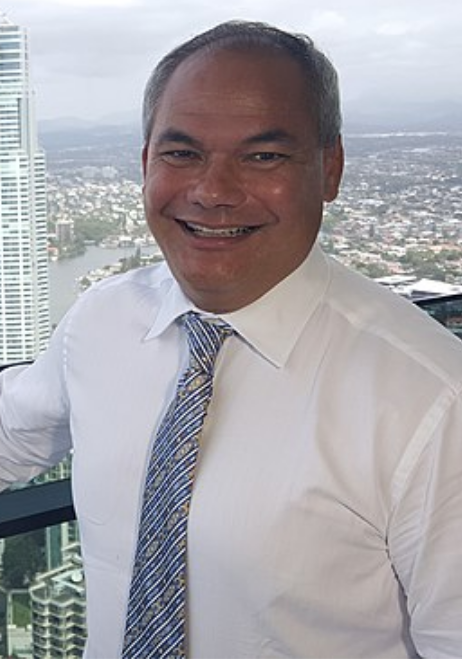
	First party	Second party	Third party
		IND	IND
Candidate	Tom Tate	Penny Toland	Jim Wilson
Party	Independent LNP	Independent	Independent
Popular vote	172,735	53,081	25,181
Percentage	63.86%	19.62%	9.31%
2CP	73.14%	26.86%
Mayor before election
Tom Tate
Independent LNP
Subsequent Mayor
Tom Tate
Independent LNP
- All 15 members on the City Council (including the mayor); 8 seats needed for a majority
Party	Leader	Vote %	Seats	+/–
Independents	N/A		9	
Independent LNP	N/A		5	
This lists parties that won seats. See the complete results below.

The 2016 Gold Coast City Council election was held on 19 March 2016 to elect a mayor and 14 councillors to the City of Gold Coast. The election was held as part of the statewide local elections in Queensland, Australia.

== Results ==
=== Mayor ===
2016 Queensland mayoral elections: Gold Coast
Party	Candidate	Votes	%	±%
Independent LNP	Tom Tate	172,735	63.86	
Independent	Penny Toland	53,081	19.62	
Independent	Jim Wilson	25,181	9.31	
Independent	Brett Lambert	8,151	3.01	
Independent	Andrew Middleton	5,978	2.21	
Independent	John Abbott	5,369	1.98	
Total formal votes		270,495	94.73	
Informal votes		15,050	5.27	
Turnout		285,545		
Two-candidate-preferred result
Independent LNP	Tom Tate	176,538	73.14	
Independent	Penny Toland	64,826	26.86	
Independent LNP hold		Swing		

== See also ==
- 2016 Queensland local elections
- 2016 Brisbane City Council election
