= Results of the 2020 Queensland local elections =

This is a list of local government area results for the 2020 Queensland local elections.

== Aurukun ==
2020 Queensland local elections: Aurukun
Party	Candidate	Votes	%	±%
Independent	Kempo Tamwoy (elected)	352	18.64	+18.64
Independent	Craig Koomeeta (elected)	335	17.74	+17.74
Independent	Delys Yunkaporta (elected)	251	13.29	+13.29
Independent	Anna Kerindun (elected)	197	10.43	+10.43
Independent	Noel Waterman	179	9.48	+9.48
Independent	Bobby Adidi	163	8.63	+0.69
Independent	Douglas Ahlers	147	7.79	+7.79
Independent	Stuart Marquardt	134	7.10	−4.11
Independent	Jonah Yunkaporta	130	6.89	+6.89
Turnout			66.91	

== Brisbane ==
2020 Queensland local elections: Brisbane
Party	Votes	%	Swing	Seats	Change
Liberal National	279,793	45.9	−3.9	19	Steady
Labor	200,428	32.9	−0.3	5	Steady
Greens	108,759	17.8	+3.3	1	Steady
Independent	19,790	3.2	+1.2	1	Steady
Motorists	586	0.1	+0.1	0	Steady
Animal Justice	428	0.1	+0.1	0	Steady

=== Bracken Ridge ===
2020 Queensland local elections: Bracken Ridge Ward
Party	Candidate	Votes	%	±%
Liberal National	Sandy Landers	11,798	50.0	−6.6
Labor	Cath Palmer	8,850	37.5	+2.9
Greens	Kathryn Fry	2,929	12.4	+3.6
Total formal votes		23,577		
Informal votes		707		
Turnout		24,284		
Two-party-preferred result
Liberal National	Sandy Landers	12,127	54.2	−6.4
Labor	Cath Palmer	10,267	45.8	+6.4
Liberal National hold		Swing	−6.4	

=== Calamvale ===
2020 Queensland local elections: Calamvale Ward
Party	Candidate	Votes	%	±%
Liberal National	Angela Owen	11,887	48.3	−10.9
Labor	James Martin	10,316	41.9	+11.4
Greens	Josie Mira	2,393	9.7	−0.5
Total formal votes		24,596		
Informal votes		692		
Turnout		25,288		
Two-party-preferred result
Liberal National	Angela Owen	12,156	52.2	−12.1
Labor	James Martin	11,113	47.8	+12.1
Liberal National hold		Swing	−12.1	

=== Central ===
2020 Queensland local elections: Central Ward
Party	Candidate	Votes	%	±%
Liberal National	Vicki Howard	9,800	48.40	–2.44
Greens	Trina Massey	5,568	27.50	+5.01
Labor	Judi Jabour	4,879	24.10	–2.57
Total formal votes		20,247	97.98	+0.28
Informal votes		418	2.02	–0.28
Turnout		20,665	69.58	–5.85
Notional two-party-preferred count
Liberal National	Vicki Howard	10,333	57.56	–0.65
Labor	Judy Jabour	7,619	42.44	+0.65
Two-party-preferred result
Liberal National	Vicki Howard	10,359	57.77	–0.44
Greens	Trina Massey	7,573	42.23	+42.23
Liberal National hold		Swing	–0.44	

=== Chandler ===
2020 Queensland local elections: Chandler Ward
Party	Candidate	Votes	%	±%
Liberal National	Ryan Murphy	15,516	63.9	–3.7
Labor	Penny O'Neill	6,167	25.4	+1.8
Greens	Steph Moss	2,604	10.7	+2.3
Total formal votes		24,278		
Informal votes		581		
Turnout		24,868		
Two-party-preferred result
Liberal National	Ryan Murphy	15,764	68.3	–3.8
Labor	Penny O'Neill	7,307	31.7	+3.8
Liberal National hold		Swing	–3.8	

=== Coorparoo ===
2020 Queensland local elections: Coorparoo Ward
Party	Candidate	Votes	%	±%
Liberal National	Fiona Cunningham	10,575	44.87	−1.63
Greens	Sally Dillon	6,509	27.62	+9.82
Labor	Matt Campbell	6,484	27.51	−5.61
Total formal votes		23,568	98.0	+0.7
Informal votes		476	2.0	−0.7
Turnout		24,044	77.3	
Two-party-preferred result
Liberal National	Fiona Cunningham	11,338	55.67	+2.57
Greens	Sally Dillon	9,030	44.33	+44.33
Liberal National hold		Swing	+2.57	

=== Deagon ===
2020 Queensland local elections: Deagon Ward
Party	Candidate	Votes	%	±%
Labor	Jared Cassidy	13,127	51.3	+8.2
Liberal National	Kimberley Washington	8,919	34.9	−8.1
Greens	Anthony Walsh	2,935	11.5	−2.4
Motorists	Kathy Moloney	586	2.3	+2.3
Total formal votes		25,567		
Informal votes		688		
Turnout		26,255		
Two-party-preferred result
Labor	Jared Cassidy	14,818	61.5	+8.6
Liberal National	Kimberley Washington	9,284	38.5	−8.6
Labor hold		Swing	+8.6	

=== Doboy ===
2020 Queensland local elections: Doboy Ward
Party	Candidate	Votes	%	±%
Liberal National	Lisa Atwood	12,549	54.7	+9.6
Labor	Jo Culshaw	10,379	45.3	+2.7
Total formal votes		22,928		
Informal votes		661		
Turnout		23,589		
Two-party-preferred result
Liberal National	Lisa Atwood	12,549	54.7	+4.7
Labor	Jo Culshaw	10,379	45.3	−4.7
Liberal National hold		Swing	+4.7	

=== Enoggera ===
2020 Queensland local elections: Enoggera Ward
Party	Candidate	Votes	%	±%
Liberal National	Andrew Wines	10,703	45.1	−4.4
Labor	Jonty Bush	8,169	34.4	+0.3
Greens	Ell-Leigh Ackerman	3,821	16.1	−0.2
Independent	Craig Whiteman	645	2.7	+2.7
Independent	Kristin Perissinotto	387	1.6	+1.6
Total formal votes		23,725		
Informal votes		517		
Turnout		24,242		
Two-party-preferred result
Liberal National	Andrew Wines	11,110	51.8	−3.2
Labor	Jonty Bush	10,325	48.2	+3.2
Liberal National hold		Swing	−3.2	

=== Forest Lake ===
2020 Queensland local elections: Forest Lake Ward
Party	Candidate	Votes	%	±%
Labor	Charles Strunk	12,667	52.8	+3.6
Liberal National	Roger Hooper	7,399	30.8	−9.8
Greens	Jenny Mulkearns	3,920	16.3	+6.2
Total formal votes		23,986		
Informal votes		1,044		
Turnout		25,030		
Two-party-preferred result
Labor	Charles Strunk	13,971	63.4	+7.9
Liberal National	Roger Hooper	8,072	36.6	−7.9
Labor hold		Swing	+7.9	

=== Hamilton ===
2020 Queensland local elections: Hamilton Ward
Party	Candidate	Votes	%	±%
Liberal National	David McLachlan	13,398	63.90	+2.68
Labor	Leah Malzard	4,202	20.04	–4.36
Greens	Miranda Bertram	3,368	16.06	+1.69
Total formal votes		22,122	97.71	+0.15
Informal votes		519	2.29	–0.15
Turnout		22,641	74.44	–6.8
Two-party-preferred result
Liberal National	David McLachlan	14,471	70.46	N/A
Labor	Leah Malzard	6,066	29.54	N/A
Liberal National hold		Swing	N/A	

=== Holland Park ===
2020 Queensland local elections: Holland Park Ward
Party	Candidate	Votes	%	±%
Liberal National	Krista Adams	11,553	48.4	−0.8
Labor	Karleigh Auguston	7,323	30.7	−5.5
Greens	Jenny Gamble	4,975	20.9	+6.8
Total formal votes		23,851		
Informal votes		580		
Turnout		24,431		
Two-party-preferred result
Liberal National	Krista Adams	11,992	54.7	+0.3
Labor	Karleigh Auguston	9,924	45.3	−0.3
Liberal National hold		Swing	+0.3	

=== Jamboree ===
2020 Queensland local elections: Jamboree Ward
Party	Candidate	Votes	%	±%
Liberal National	Sarah Hutton	13,455	54.9	−7.6
Labor	Rachel Hoppe	7,996	32.7	+7.6
Greens	Thomas McKie	3,039	12.4	+0.6
Total formal votes		24,490		
Informal votes		750		
Turnout		25,240		
Two-party-preferred result
Liberal National	Sarah Hutton	13,764	59.3	−8.7
Labor	Rachel Hoppe	9,442	40.7	+8.7
Liberal National hold		Swing	−8.7	

=== MacGregor ===
2020 Queensland local elections: MacGregor Ward
Party	Candidate	Votes	%	±%
Liberal National	Steven Huang	13,345	59.4	+0.4
Labor	Trent McTiernan	6,460	28.7	−0.1
Greens	Sean Womersley	2,666	11.9	−0.3
Total formal votes		22,471		
Informal votes		630		
Turnout		23,101		
Two-party-preferred result
Liberal National	Steven Huang	13,588	64.1	−0.8
Labor	Trent McTiernan	7,603	35.9	+0.8
Liberal National hold		Swing	−0.8	

=== Marchant ===
2020 Queensland local elections: Marchant Ward
Party	Candidate	Votes	%	±%
Liberal National	Fiona Hammond	11,870	49.4	−3.5
Labor	Susan Lynch	7,842	32.6	−0.7
Greens	John Meyer	4,331	18.0	+4.2
Total formal votes		24,043		
Informal votes		676		
Turnout		24,719		
Two-party-preferred result
Liberal National	Fiona Hammond	12,315	55.0	−2.9
Labor	Susan Lynch	10,083	45.0	+2.9
Liberal National hold		Swing	−2.9	

=== McDowall ===
2020 Queensland local elections: McDowall Ward
Party	Candidate	Votes	%	±%
Liberal National	Tracy Davis	14,693	59.2	−1.8
Labor	Liam Culverhouse	7,380	29.7	+0.1
Greens	Joshua Sanderson	2,754	11.1	+1.7
Total formal votes		24,827		
Informal votes		580		
Turnout		25,407		
Two-party-preferred result
Liberal National	Tracy Davis	15,006	63.5	−1.7
Labor	Liam Culverhouse	8,611	36.5	+1.7
Liberal National hold		Swing	−1.7	

=== Moorooka ===
2020 Queensland local elections: Moorooka Ward
Party	Candidate	Votes	%	±%
Labor	Steve Griffiths	10,416	49.9	−0.3
Liberal National	Warren Craze	5,234	25.1	−4.8
Greens	Claire Garton	4,209	20.2	+4.2
Independent	Brett Gillespie	1,000	4.8	+4.8
Total formal votes		20,859		
Informal votes		727		
Turnout		21,586		
Two-party-preferred result
Labor	Steve Griffiths	12,837	69.5	+5.0
Liberal National	Warren Craze	5,621	30.5	−5.0
Labor hold		Swing	+5.0	

=== Morningside ===
2020 Queensland local elections: Morningside Ward
Party	Candidate	Votes	%	±%
Labor	Kara Cook	10,677	47.9	−0.3
Liberal National	Toby Moore	8,242	36.9	−4.2
Greens	Rolf Kuelsen	3,390	15.2	+4.5
Total formal votes		22,309		
Informal votes		445		
Turnout		22,754		
Two-party-preferred result
Labor	Kara Cook	12,543	59.7	+3.8
Liberal National	Toby Moore	8,482	40.3	−3.8
Labor hold		Swing	+3.8	

=== Northgate ===
2020 Queensland local elections: Northgate Ward
Party	Candidate	Votes	%	±%
Liberal National	Adam Allan	11,315	46.7	+0.2
Labor	Reg Neil	8,810	36.4	−2.8
Greens	Jim Davies	4,106	16.9	+2.6
Total formal votes		24,231		
Informal votes		666		
Turnout		24,897		
Two-party-preferred result
Liberal National	Adam Allan	11,750	51.9	+0.3
Labor	Reg Neil	10,911	48.1	−0.3
Liberal National hold		Swing	+0.3	

=== Paddington ===
2020 Queensland local elections: Paddington Ward
Party	Candidate	Votes	%	±%
Liberal National	Peter Matic	10,629	45.4	−3.2
Greens	Donna Burns	8,984	38.4	+11.5
Labor	Jeff Eelkema	3,775	16.1	−8.3
Total formal votes		23,388	98.5	+0.4
Informal votes		347	1.5	−0.4
Turnout		23,735	75.4	−3.2
Notional two-party-preferred count
Liberal National	Peter Matic	11,489	58.4	+1.1
Labor	Jeff Eelkema	8,196	41.6	−1.1
Two-party-preferred result
Liberal National	Peter Matic	11,064	50.7	−5.1
Greens	Donna Burns	10,753	49.3	+5.1
Liberal National hold		Swing	−5.1	

=== Pullenvale ===
2020 Queensland local elections: Pullenvale Ward
Party	Candidate	Votes	%	±%
Liberal National	Greg Adermann	10,686	41.68	−18.82
Greens	Charles Druckmann	6,252	24.38	+2.88
Independent	Kate Richards	5,060	19.73	+19.73
Labor	Jordan Mark	3,643	14.21	–3.79
Total formal votes		25,641	97.6	−0.2
Informal votes		618	2.4	+0.2
Turnout		26,259	82.7	−
Notional two-party-preferred count
Liberal National	Greg Adermann	12,388	62.2	–6.7
Labor	Jordan Mark	7,533	37.8	+6.7
Two-party-preferred result
Liberal National	Greg Adermann	12,086	59.93	−8.17
Greens	Charles Druckmann	8,080	40.07	+8.17
Liberal National hold		Swing	−8.17	

- Incumbent councillor Kate Richards left the LNP to contest as an independent

=== Runcorn ===
2020 Queensland local elections: Runcorn Ward
Party	Candidate	Votes	%	±%
Liberal National	Kim Marx	12,949	54.1	−0.1
Labor	John Prescott	8,491	35.5	−0.4
Greens	Nicola Gordon	2,482	10.4	+0.5
Total formal votes		23,922		
Informal votes		698		
Turnout		24,620		
Two-party-preferred result
Liberal National	Kim Marx	13,269	58.3	−0.3
Labor	John Prescott	9,501	41.7	+0.3
Liberal National hold		Swing	−0.3	

=== Tennyson ===
2020 Queensland local elections: Tennyson Ward
Party	Candidate	Votes	%	±%
Independent	Nicole Johnston	11,571	51.1	−0.1
Liberal National	Maurice Lane	4,394	19.4	+0.4
Labor	Jackie Schneider	3,212	14.2	−2.5
Greens	Patsy O'Brien	3,058	13.5	+0.3
Animal Justice	Darryl Prout	428	1.9	+1.9
Total formal votes		22,663	98.3	+0.5
Informal votes		383	1.7	−0.5
Turnout		23,046	79.2	
Notional two-party-preferred count
Liberal National	Maurice Lane	8,756	58.1	+3.4
Labor	Jackie Schneider	6,307	41.9	−3.4
Two-party-preferred result
Independent	Nicole Johnston	14,253	73.4	+0.4
Liberal National	Maurice Lane	5,155	26.6	+26.6
Independent hold		Swing	+0.4	

=== The Gabba ===
2020 Queensland local elections: The Gabba Ward
Party	Candidate	Votes	%	±%
Greens	Jonathan Sri	9,383	45.6	+12.4
Liberal National	Nathaniel Jones	6,060	29.4	–4.8
Labor	Rachel Gallagher	5,136	25.0	–5.2
Total formal votes		20,579	97.7	+0.6
Informal votes		495	2.3	–0.6
Turnout		21,074	–	–
Notional two-party-preferred count
Labor	Rachel Gallagher	9,753	58.4	N/A
Liberal National	Nathaniel Jones	6,959	41.6	N/A
Two-party-preferred result
Greens	Jonathan Sri	11,418	62.3	+5.3
Liberal National	Nathaniel Jones	6,899	37.7	–5.3
Greens hold		Swing	+5.3	

=== The Gap ===
2020 Queensland local elections: The Gap Ward
Party	Candidate	Votes	%	±%
Liberal National	Steven Toomey	12,872	50.6	+0.8
Labor	Daniel Bevis	7,822	30.7	−4.4
Greens	Rebecca Haley	4,317	17.0	+1.9
Independent	Allen Hassall	443	1.7	+1.7
Total formal votes		25,454		
Informal votes		504		
Turnout		25,958		
Two-party-preferred result
Liberal National	Steven Toomey	13,335	57.1	+2.4
Labor	Daniel Bevis	10,039	42.9	−2.4
Liberal National hold		Swing	+2.4	

=== Walter Taylor ===
2020 Queensland local elections: Walter Taylor Ward
Party	Candidate	Votes	%	±%
Liberal National	James Mackay	10,957	46.9	−12.7
Greens	Michaela Sargent	8,147	34.9	+11.9
Labor	Karthika Raghwan	3,582	15.3	−2.1
Independent	Matt Antoniolli	684	2.9	+2.9
Total formal votes		23,370	98.3	+0.2
Informal votes		412	1.7	−0.2
Turnout		23,782	77.5	−4.1
Notional two-party-preferred count
Liberal National	James Mackay	11,878	60.6	–7.2
Labor	Karthika Raghwan	7,734	39.4	+7.2
Two-party-preferred result
Liberal National	James Mackay	11,439	53.9	−11.8
Greens	Michaela Sargent	9,766	46.1	+11.8
Liberal National hold		Swing	−11.8	

=== Wynnum Manly ===
2020 Queensland local elections: Wynnum Manly Ward
Party	Candidate	Votes	%	±%
Labor	Peter Cumming	12,436	53.9	−2.0
Liberal National	Megan Piccardi	8,292	35.9	+0.2
Greens	Ken Austin	2,355	10.2	+1.9
Total formal votes		23,083		
Informal votes		537		
Turnout		23,620		
Two-party-preferred result
Labor	Peter Cumming	13,581	61.4	−0.3
Liberal National	Megan Piccardi	8,541	38.6	+0.3
Labor hold		Swing	−0.3	

== Gold Coast ==
=== Division 1 ===
2020 Queensland local elections: Division 1
Party	Candidate	Votes	%	±%
Independent	Mark Hammel	8,692	45.79	+45.79
Independent Labor	Renee Clarke	4,847	25.53	+25.53
Independent LNP	Alec Pokarier	2,609	13.74	+13.74
Independent	Pat Reynolds	1,690	8.90	+8.90
Greens	Andrew Stimson	1,145	6.03	+6.03
Turnout		20,219	74.58	
Two-candidate-preferred result
Independent	Mark Hammel	9,505	62.11	+62.11
Independent Labor	Renee Clarke	5,798	37.89	+37.89
Independent hold		Swing	+62.11	

=== Division 2 ===
2020 Queensland local elections: Division 2
Party	Candidate	Votes	%	±%
Independent LNP	William Owen-Jones	12,179	58.85	−41.15
Independent	John Wayne	8,517	41.15	+41.15
Turnout		21,764	75.69	
Independent LNP hold		Swing	−41.15	

=== Division 3 ===
2020 Queensland local elections: Division 3
Party	Candidate	Votes	%	±%
Independent	Donna Gates	14,085	76.13	+76.13
Independent	Wayne Purcell	4,416	23.87	+23.87
Turnout		19,550	72.03	
Independent gain from Independent LNP		Swing	+76.13	

=== Division 4 ===
2020 Queensland local elections: Division 4
Party	Candidate	Votes	%	±%
Independent LNP	Cameron Caldwell	11,617	56.52	+56.52
Independent	Kristyn Boulton	8,936	43.48	−11.96
Turnout		21,406	77.02	
Independent LNP gain from Independent		Swing	+56.52	

=== Division 5 ===
2020 Queensland local elections: Division 5
Party	Candidate	Votes	%	±%
Independent	Peter Young	unopposed		
Independent hold		Swing	N/A	

=== Division 6 ===
2020 Queensland local elections: Division 6
Party	Candidate	Votes	%	±%
Independent LNP	Brooke Patterson	6,591	39.27	+39.27
Independent	Shaelee Welchman	4,463	26.59	+26.59
Independent	Michael Pulford	2,531	15.08	−5.90
Independent	Susie Gallagher	2,219	13.22	−10.06
Independent	Josephine Tobias	978	5.83	+5.83
Turnout		17,865	68.99	
Two-candidate-preferred result
Independent LNP	Brooke Patterson	7,322	59.26	+59.26
Independent	Shaelee Welchman	5,034	40.74	+40.74
Independent LNP gain from Independent		Swing	+59.26	

=== Division 7 ===
2020 Queensland local elections: Division 7
Party	Candidate	Votes	%	±%
Independent LNP	Ryan Bayldon-Lumsden	12,486	61.23	+61.23
Independent LNP	Wendy Coe	3,149	15.44	+15.44
Greens	Amin Javanmard	1,959	9.61	+9.61
Independent	Tony Melia	1,908	9.36	+9.36
Independent	Andre Saint-Flour	890	4.36	+4.36
Turnout		21,638	73.75	
Two-candidate-preferred result
Independent LNP	Ryan Bayldon-Lumsden	13,214	78.46	+78.46
Independent LNP	Wendy Coe	3,627	21.54	+21.54
Independent LNP gain from Independent		Swing	+78.46	

- Incumbent councillor Gary Baildon (Independent) did not recontest

=== Division 8 ===
2020 Queensland local elections: Division 8
Party	Candidate	Votes	%	±%
Independent LNP	Bob La Castra	9,974	52.59	−9.42
Independent	Joshua Smith	5,664	29.86	+29.86
Independent	Matthew Armstrong	3,329	17.55	+17.55
Turnout		20,125	74.09	
Two-candidate-preferred result
Independent LNP	Bob La Castra	10,200	62.23	−7.61
Independent	Joshua Smith	6,190	37.77	+37.77
Independent LNP hold		Swing	−7.61	

=== Division 9 ===
2020 Queensland local elections: Division 9
Party	Candidate	Votes	%	±%
Independent LNP	Glenn Tozer	12,204	60.39	−4.21
Independent	Mary-Anne Hossack	4,519	22.36	+22.36
Independent	Keith Douglas	2,748	13.60	+13.60
Independent	David Guimaraes	738	3.65	+3.65
Turnout		21,302	77.10	
Two-candidate-preferred result
Independent LNP	Glenn Tozer	12,618	71.10	+6.50
Independent	Mary-Anne Hossack	5,129	28.90	+28.90
Independent LNP hold		Swing	+6.50	

=== Division 10 ===
2020 Queensland local elections: Division 10
Party	Candidate	Votes	%	±%
Independent	Eddy Sarroff	4,615	25.94	+25.94
Independent LNP	Darren Taylor	4,540	25.52	+25.52
Independent	Mike Winlaw	3,569	20.06	+20.06
Independent	Adrian Johnston	2,500	14.05	+14.05
Animal Justice	Rowan Panozzo	1,082	6.08	+6.08
Independent	Seema Chauhan	939	5.28	+5.28
Independent	Stephen Cornelius	543	3.05	+3.05
Turnout		18,966	67.82	
Two-candidate-preferred result
Independent LNP	Darren Taylor	5,627	50.66	+50.66
Independent	Eddy Sarroff	5,481	49.34	+49.34
Independent LNP hold		Swing	+50.66	

=== Division 11 ===
2020 Queensland local elections: Division 11
Party	Candidate	Votes	%	±%
Independent LNP	Hermann Vorster	14,501	73.33	+14.09
Independent Greens	Chantal Clarke	5,275	26.67	+26.67
Turnout		20,829	74.04	
Independent LNP hold		Swing	+14.09	

=== Division 12 ===
2020 Queensland local elections: Division 12
Party	Candidate	Votes	%	±%
Independent	Pauline Young	8,642	46.27	−0.61
Independent	Cathy Osbourne	5,223	27.96	+27.96
Independent LNP	Zac Revere	2,422	12.97	+12.97
Greens	Scott Turner	2,390	12.80	+12.80
Turnout		19,933	72.98	
Two-candidate-preferred result
Independent	Pauline Young	8,985	60.83	+5.31
Independent	Cathy Osbourne	5,786	39.17	+39.17
Independent hold		Swing	+5.31	

=== Division 13 ===
2020 Queensland local elections: Division 13
Party	Candidate	Votes	%	±%
Independent	Daphne McDonald	8,998	47.06	+5.09
Independent Labor	Katrina Beikoff	5,094	26.64	−1.93
Independent	Bern Young	2,816	14.73	+14.73
Animal Justice	Scott Wallace	2,212	11.57	+11.57
Turnout		20,119	73.54	
Two-candidate-preferred result
Independent	Daphne McDonald	9,626	63.03	+5.09
Independent Labor	Katrina Beikoff	5,645	36.97	−5.09
Independent hold		Swing	+5.09	

=== Division 14 ===
2020 Queensland local elections Division 14
Party	Candidate	Votes	%	±%
Independent	Gail O'Neill	11,460	62.35	+5.84
Independent	Gloria Baker	6,921	37.65	+37.65
Independent hold		Swing	+5.84	

== Ipswich ==
2020 Queensland local elections: Ipswich
Party	Votes	%	Swing	Seats	Change
Independent Labor	37,280	40.41		2	▼4
Your Voice of Experience	18,917	20.50	+20.50	2	▲2
Independent	15,212	16.49		4	Steady
Team WORK	7,483	8.11		0	Steady
Liberal Democrats	7,433	8.06		0	Steady
Independent LNP	5,931	6.43		0	Steady
Formal votes	184,512	100.0			
Formal ballots	92,256	88.73			
Informal ballots	11,720	11.27			
Total	103,976	100.0		8	▼2
Registered voters / turnout	133,368	77.96			

=== Division 1 ===
2020 Queensland local elections: Division 1
Party	Candidate	Votes	%	±%
Independent	Sheila Ireland (elected)	8,280	19.64	
Independent Labor	Jacob Madsen (elected)	7,936	18.82	
Independent LNP	Simon Ingram	5,931	14.07	
Independent Labor	Pye Augustine	5,560	13.19	
Independent	Kendal Newman	4,535	10.76	
Independent	Jim Thompson	4,155	9.85	
Independent	Conny Turni	2,970	7.04	
Independent	Will Jankovic	2,799	6.64	
Turnout		24,106	78.43	
Independent win		(new ward)		
Independent Labor win		(new ward)		

=== Division 2 ===
2020 Queensland local elections: Division 2
Party	Candidate	Votes	%	±%
Your Voice Of Experience	Paul Tully (elected)	10,896	21.87	
Your Voice Of Experience	Nicole Jonic (elected)	8,021	16.10	
Independent	Steven Purcell	4,916	9.87	
Independent	Sarah Knopke	4,716	9.47	
Independent	Luise Manning	4,642	9.32	
Liberal Democrats	Anthony Bull	3,830	7.69	
Independent	James Pinnell	3,216	6.46	
Independent	Paul Modra	2,666	5.35	
Independent	Andrea Dunn	2,414	4.85	
Independent	Sirle Adamson	2,284	4.59	
Independent	Brad Hunt	2,213	4.44	
Turnout		27,647	78.90	
Your Voice Of Experience win		(new ward)		
Your Voice Of Experience win		(new ward)		

=== Division 3 ===
2020 Queensland local elections: Division 3
Party	Candidate	Votes	%	±%
Independent	Marnie Doyle (elected)	10,398	21.66	
Independent	Andrew Fechner (elected)	5,743	11.96	
Independent	Jim Dodrill	5,041	10.50	
Team WORK	Alyson Lewis	4,924	10.26	
Independent Labor	Toni Gibbs	4,877	10.16	
Independent	David Box	4,466	9.30	
Liberal Democrats	Jacinta Bull	3,603	7.50	
Team WORK	Bill Heck	2,559	5.33	
Independent	Rochelle Caloon	1,942	4.04	
Independent	Darren Close	1,905	3.97	
Independent Labor	Drew Pickwick	1,762	3.67	
Independent	Kevin Le Grice	792	1.65	
Turnout		27,080	75.81	
Independent win		(new ward)		
Independent win		(new ward)		

=== Division 4 ===
2020 Queensland local elections: Division 4
Party	Candidate	Votes	%	±%
Independent Labor	Kate Kunzelmann (elected)	9,354	21.01	
Independent	Russell Milligan (elected)	8,057	18.10	
Independent Labor	Susan Dunne	7,791	17.50	
Independent	Gary Duffy	7,022	15.77	
Independent	Brian Scott	6,695	15.04	
Independent	Shane Blake	5,601	12.58	
Turnout		25,143	78.89	
Independent Labor win		(new ward)		
Independent win		(new ward)		

== Moreton Bay ==
=== 2021 Division 7 by-election ===
2021 Division 7 by-election (4 December 2021)
Party	Candidate	Votes	%	±%
Independent LNP	Yvonne Barlow	4,265	26.57	
Independent	Brett Hayes	3,585	22.34	
Independent	Dean Teasdale	2,612	16.27	
Independent Labor	Ryan Bakker	2,539	15.82	
Independent	Ben Wood	2,141	13.34	
Independent	Jackie Findlay	909	5.66	
Total formal votes		16,051	95.07	
Informal votes		833	4.93	
Turnout		16,884	64.62	
Two-candidate-preferred result
Independent LNP	Yvonne Barlow	5,533	50.26	
Independent	Brett Hayes	5,475	49.74	
Independent LNP gain from Independent		Swing	N/A	

- By-election held following resignation of Denise Sims (Independent) on 20 October 2021
