= 2020 Gold Coast City Council election =

Local elections in Australia

- 28 March 2020
- Turnout: 74.12% (mayoral election)
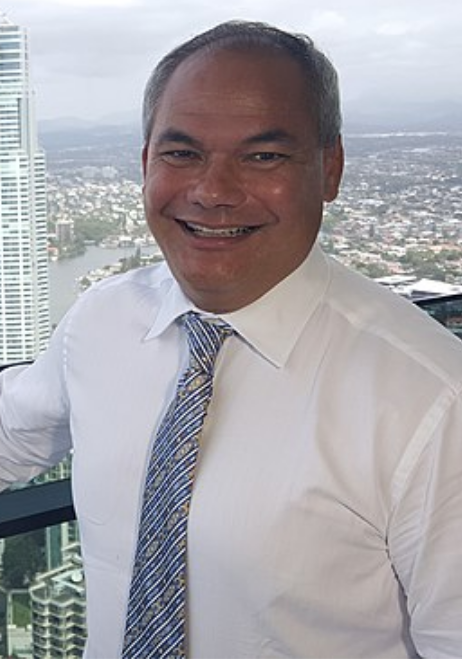
	First party	Second party	Third party
		IND	IND
Candidate	Tom Tate	Mona Hecke	Brett Lambert
Party	Independent LNP	Independent	Independent
Popular vote	151,579	67,117	17,083
Percentage	55.73%	24.68%	6.28%
Swing	▼8.13	▲24.68	▲3.22
2CP	66.93%	33.07%
2CP swing	▼6.21	▲33.07
Mayor before election
Tom Tate
Independent LNP
Subsequent Mayor
Tom Tate
Independent LNP
- All 15 members on the City Council (including the mayor); 8 seats needed for a majority
Party	Leader	Vote %	Seats	+/–
Independent LNP	N/A		7	+2
Independents	N/A		7	−2
This lists parties that won seats. See the complete results below.

The 2020 Gold Coast City Council election was held on 28 March 2020 to elect a mayor and 14 councillors to the City of Gold Coast. The election was held as part of the statewide local elections in Queensland, Australia.

Incumbent mayor Tom Tate was re-elected with more than 66% of the vote after preference distribution. The Queensland Greens, Civil Liberties & Motorists Party and Animal Justice Party formally endorsed candidates, while Labor and the LNP did not (although several members contested as independents).

== Results ==
=== Mayor ===
2020 Queensland mayoral elections: Gold Coast
Party	Candidate	Votes	%	±%
Independent	Tom Tate	151,579	55.73	−8.13
Independent	Mona Hecke	67,117	24.68	+24.68
Independent	Brett Lambert	17,083	6.28	+3.22
Independent	Virginia Freebody	15,260	5.61	+5.61
Independent	Kris Bourban	9,115	3.35	+3.35
Independent	Gary Pead	6,843	2.52	+2.52
Civil Liberties & Motorists	Suphakan Somsriruen	2,545	0.94	+0.94
Independent	Derek Rosborough	2,429	0.89	+0.89
Turnout		287,531	74.12	
Two-candidate-preferred result
Independent	Tom Tate	154,054	66.93	−6.21
Independent	Mona Hecke	76,126	33.07	+33.07
Independent hold		Swing	−6.21	

=== Division 1 ===
2020 Queensland local elections: Division 1
Party	Candidate	Votes	%	±%
Independent	Mark Hammel	8,692	45.79	+45.79
Independent Labor	Renee Clarke	4,847	25.53	+25.53
Independent LNP	Alec Pokarier	2,609	13.74	+13.74
Independent	Pat Reynolds	1,690	8.90	+8.90
Greens	Andrew Stimson	1,145	6.03	+6.03
Turnout		20,219	74.58	
Two-candidate-preferred result
Independent	Mark Hammel	9,505	62.11	+62.11
Independent Labor	Renee Clarke	5,798	37.89	+37.89
Independent hold		Swing	+62.11	

=== Division 2 ===
2020 Queensland local elections: Division 2
Party	Candidate	Votes	%	±%
Independent LNP	William Owen-Jones	12,179	58.85	−41.15
Independent	John Wayne	8,517	41.15	+41.15
Turnout		21,764	75.69	
Independent LNP hold		Swing	−41.15	

=== Division 3 ===
2020 Queensland local elections: Division 3
Party	Candidate	Votes	%	±%
Independent	Donna Gates	14,085	76.13	+76.13
Independent	Wayne Purcell	4,416	23.87	+23.87
Turnout		19,550	72.03	
Independent gain from Independent LNP		Swing	+76.13	

=== Division 4 ===
2020 Queensland local elections: Division 4
Party	Candidate	Votes	%	±%
Independent LNP	Cameron Caldwell	11,617	56.52	+56.52
Independent	Kristyn Boulton	8,936	43.48	−11.96
Turnout		21,406	77.02	
Independent LNP gain from Independent		Swing	+56.52	

=== Division 5 ===
2020 Queensland local elections: Division 5
Party	Candidate	Votes	%	±%
Independent	Peter Young	unopposed		
Independent hold		Swing	N/A	

=== Division 6 ===
2020 Queensland local elections: Division 6
Party	Candidate	Votes	%	±%
Independent LNP	Brooke Patterson	6,591	39.27	+39.27
Independent	Shaelee Welchman	4,463	26.59	+26.59
Independent	Michael Pulford	2,531	15.08	−5.90
Independent	Susie Gallagher	2,219	13.22	−10.06
Independent	Josephine Tobias	978	5.83	+5.83
Turnout		17,865	68.99	
Two-candidate-preferred result
Independent LNP	Brooke Patterson	7,322	59.26	+59.26
Independent	Shaelee Welchman	5,034	40.74	+40.74
Independent LNP gain from Independent		Swing	+59.26	

=== Division 7 ===
2020 Queensland local elections: Division 7
Party	Candidate	Votes	%	±%
Independent LNP	Ryan Bayldon-Lumsden	12,486	61.23	+61.23
Independent LNP	Wendy Coe	3,149	15.44	+15.44
Greens	Amin Javanmard	1,959	9.61	+9.61
Independent	Tony Melia	1,908	9.36	+9.36
Independent	Andre Saint-Flour	890	4.36	+4.36
Turnout		21,638	73.75	
Two-candidate-preferred result
Independent LNP	Ryan Bayldon-Lumsden	13,214	78.46	+78.46
Independent LNP	Wendy Coe	3,627	21.54	+21.54
Independent LNP gain from Independent		Swing	+78.46	

- Incumbent councillor Gary Baildon (Independent) did not recontest

=== Division 8 ===
2020 Queensland local elections: Division 8
Party	Candidate	Votes	%	±%
Independent LNP	Bob La Castra	9,974	52.59	−9.42
Independent	Joshua Smith	5,664	29.86	+29.86
Independent	Matthew Armstrong	3,329	17.55	+17.55
Turnout		20,125	74.09	
Two-candidate-preferred result
Independent LNP	Bob La Castra	10,200	62.23	−7.61
Independent	Joshua Smith	6,190	37.77	+37.77
Independent LNP hold		Swing	−7.61	

=== Division 9 ===
2020 Queensland local elections: Division 9
Party	Candidate	Votes	%	±%
Independent LNP	Glenn Tozer	12,204	60.39	−4.21
Independent	Mary-Anne Hossack	4,519	22.36	+22.36
Independent	Keith Douglas	2,748	13.60	+13.60
Independent	David Guimaraes	738	3.65	+3.65
Turnout		21,302	77.10	
Two-candidate-preferred result
Independent LNP	Glenn Tozer	12,618	71.10	+6.50
Independent	Mary-Anne Hossack	5,129	28.90	+28.90
Independent LNP hold		Swing	+6.50	

=== Division 10 ===
2020 Queensland local elections: Division 10
Party	Candidate	Votes	%	±%
Independent	Eddy Sarroff	4,615	25.94	+25.94
Independent LNP	Darren Taylor	4,540	25.52	+25.52
Independent	Mike Winlaw	3,569	20.06	+20.06
Independent	Adrian Johnston	2,500	14.05	+14.05
Animal Justice	Rowan Panozzo	1,082	6.08	+6.08
Independent	Seema Chauhan	939	5.28	+5.28
Independent	Stephen Cornelius	543	3.05	+3.05
Turnout		18,966	67.82	
Two-candidate-preferred result
Independent LNP	Darren Taylor	5,627	50.66	+50.66
Independent	Eddy Sarroff	5,481	49.34	+49.34
Independent LNP hold		Swing	+50.66	

=== Division 11 ===
2020 Queensland local elections: Division 11
Party	Candidate	Votes	%	±%
Independent LNP	Hermann Vorster	14,501	73.33	+14.09
Independent Greens	Chantal Clarke	5,275	26.67	+26.67
Turnout		20,829	74.04	
Independent LNP hold		Swing	+14.09	

=== Division 12 ===
2020 Queensland local elections: Division 12
Party	Candidate	Votes	%	±%
Independent	Pauline Young	8,642	46.27	−0.61
Independent	Cathy Osbourne	5,223	27.96	+27.96
Independent LNP	Zac Revere	2,422	12.97	+12.97
Greens	Scott Turner	2,390	12.80	+12.80
Turnout		19,933	72.98	
Two-candidate-preferred result
Independent	Pauline Young	8,985	60.83	+5.31
Independent	Cathy Osbourne	5,786	39.17	+39.17
Independent hold		Swing	+5.31	

=== Division 13 ===
2020 Queensland local elections: Division 13
Party	Candidate	Votes	%	±%
Independent	Daphne McDonald	8,998	47.06	+5.09
Independent Labor	Katrina Beikoff	5,094	26.64	−1.93
Independent	Bern Young	2,816	14.73	+14.73
Animal Justice	Scott Wallace	2,212	11.57	+11.57
Turnout		20,119	73.54	
Two-candidate-preferred result
Independent	Daphne McDonald	9,626	63.03	+5.09
Independent Labor	Katrina Beikoff	5,645	36.97	−5.09
Independent hold		Swing	+5.09	

=== Division 14 ===
2020 Queensland local elections Division 14
Party	Candidate	Votes	%	±%
Independent	Gail O'Neill	11,460	62.35	+5.84
Independent	Gloria Baker	6,921	37.65	+37.65
Independent hold		Swing	+5.84	

== Electoral pendulum ==
=== Post-election pendulum ===
Independent Liberal National Divisions (7)
Marginal
Division 10	Darren Taylor	Independent LNP	0.66%
Fairly safe
Division 4	Cameron Caldwell	Independent LNP	6.5%
Division 2	William Owen-Jones	Independent LNP	8.8%
Division 6	Brooke Patterson	Independent LNP	9.2%
Safe
Division 8	Bob La Castra	Independent LNP	12.2%
Very safe
Division 11	Hermann Vorster	Independent LNP	23.3%
Division 7	Ryan Bayldon-Lumsden	Independent LNP	28.4%
Independent Divisions (7)
Safe
Division 12	Pauline Young	Independent	10.8%
Division 1	Mark Hammel	Independent	12.1%
Division 14	Gail O’Neill	Independent	12.3%
Division 13	Daphne McDonald	Independent	13.0%
Very safe
Division 3	Donna Gates	Independent	26.1%
Division 9	Glenn Tozer	Independent	21.1%
Division 5	Peter Young	Independent	N/A

== Aftermath ==
Division 4 councillor Cameron Caldwell was elected to the House of Representatives as the member for Fadden at a by-election in July 2023.

On 22 August 2023, Division 7 councillor Ryan Bayldon-Lumsden was charged by Queensland Police with the murder of his stepfather, 58-year-old Robert Lumsden. He was suspended as a councillor on 15 September 2023 until the 2024 election.

== See also ==
- 2020 Queensland local elections
- 2020 Brisbane City Council election
