= 2012 Gold Coast City Council election =

Local elections in Australia

- 28 April 2012
- Mayoral election
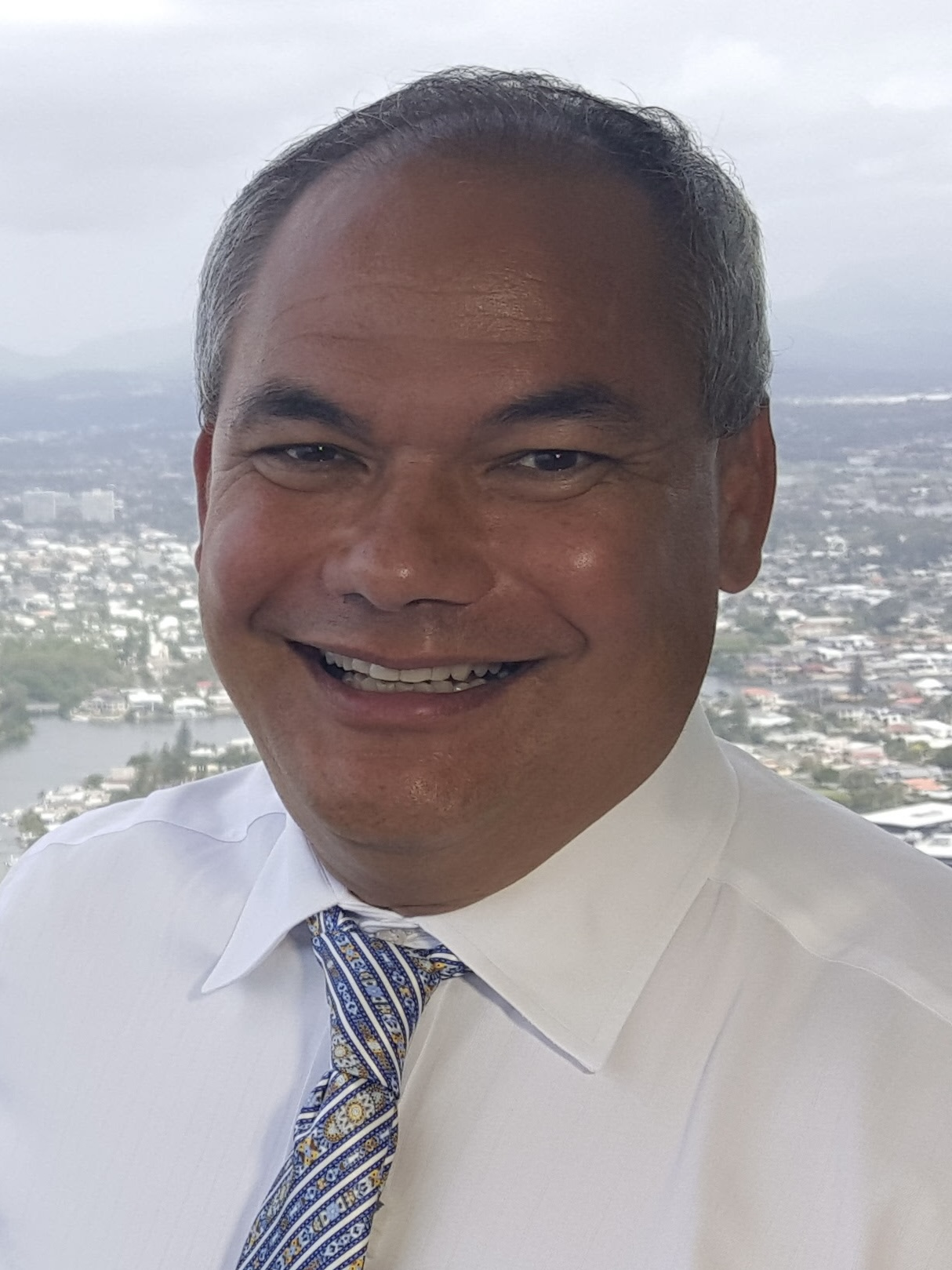

	First party	Second party	Third party
			IND
Candidate	Tom Tate	Eddy Sarroff	Susie Douglas
Party	Independent LNP	Independent	Independent
Popular vote	83,876	40,958	35,417
Percentage	37.05%	18.09%	15.65%
2CP	64.34%	35.66%
Mayor before election
Ron Clarke
Independent
Subsequent Mayor
Tom Tate
Independent LNP
- All 15 members on the City Council (including the mayor); 8 seats needed for a majority
Party	Leader	Vote %	Seats	+/–
Independents	N/A			
Independent LNP	N/A			
This lists parties that won seats. See the complete results below.

The 2012 Gold Coast City Council election was held on 28 April 2012 to elect a mayor and 14 councillors to the City of Gold Coast. The election was held as part of the statewide local elections in Queensland, Australia.

== Results ==
=== Mayor ===
2012 Queensland mayoral elections: Gold Coast
Party	Candidate	Votes	%	±%
Independent LNP	Tom Tate	83,876	37.05	
Independent	Eddy Sarroff	40,958	18.09	
Independent	Susie Douglas	35,417	15.65	
Independent	Peter Young	26,977	11.92	
Independent	Dean Vegas	20,868	9.22	
Independent	Keith Douglas	14,702	6.49	
Independent	John Abbott	3,568	1.58	
Total formal votes		226,366	95.48	
Informal votes		10,724	4.52	
Turnout		237,090		
Two-candidate-preferred result
Independent LNP	Tom Tate	90,935	64.34	
Independent	Eddy Sarroff	50,399	35.66	
Independent LNP gain from Independent		Swing		

== See also ==
- 2012 Queensland local elections
- 2012 Brisbane City Council election
