= 2024 Gold Coast City Council election =

Election of mayor and councillors to Gold Coast City Council

- 16 March 2024

All 15 seats on Gold Coast City Council 7 seats needed for a majority
- Mayor
- Turnout: 79.94% (▲5.82)
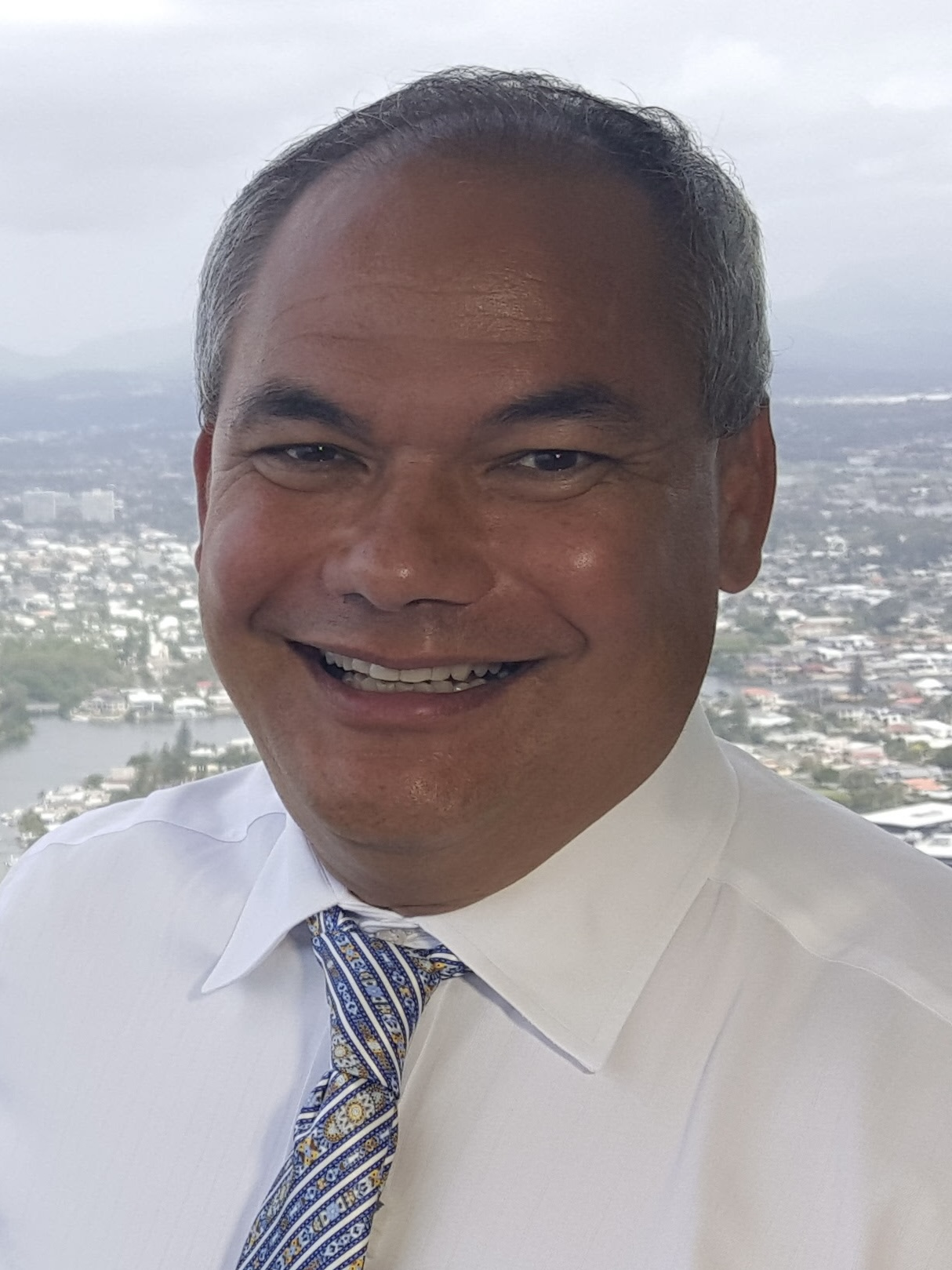

	First party	Second party	Third party
			IND
Candidate	Tom Tate	Eddy Sarroff	Danielle Dunsmore
Party	Ind. LNP	Independent	Independent
Primary vote	170,150	68,061	25,983
Percentage	51.85%	20.73%	7.91%
Swing	▼3.91	▲20.73	▲7.91
TCP	66.32%	33.68%
TCP swing	▼0.61	▲33.68
Mayor before election
Tom Tate
Ind. LNP
Elected Mayor
Tom Tate
Ind. LNP
- Councillors
Party	Leader	Vote %	Seats	+/–
Independents	N/A	66.98	7	0
Ind. LNP	N/A	29.67	7	0
This lists parties that won seats. See the complete results below.

The 2024 Gold Coast City Council election was held on 16 March 2024 to elect a mayor and 14 councillors to the City of Gold Coast. The election was held as part of the statewide local elections in Queensland, Australia.

Incumbent mayor Tom Tate was re-elected to serve a record fourth term in office.

== Background ==
Division 9 councillor Glenn Tozer, who was elected as Independent LNP, left the Liberal National Party in June 2020 to sit as an independent.

On 23 August 2023, Division 7 councillor Ryan Bayldon-Lumsden was charged by Queensland Police with the murder of his stepfather, 58-year-old Robert Lumsden. He was suspended as a councillor on 15 September 2023, but is re-contesting his seat.

== Retiring councillors ==
=== Independent ===
- Pauline Young (Division 12) – announced retirement on 28 October 2023
- Daphne McDonald (Division 13) - announced retirement on 28 January 2024

=== Independent LNP ===
- William Owen-Jones (Division 2) - announced retirement on 9 February 2023
- Cameron Caldwell (Division 4) – won Liberal National preselection for the federal seat of Fadden and won the 2023 Fadden by-election
- Hermann Vorster (Division 11) – won Liberal National preselection for the state seat of Burleigh on 29 October 2023

== Candidates ==
A total of 46 candidates ran for election. Incumbents are shown in bold text.

Ward	Held by	Independent LNP	Independent	Animal Justice	Others
Mayor	Independent LNP	**Tom Tate**; Virginia Freebody	Danielle Dunsmore; Rosie Foster; Brett Lambert; Gary Pead; Lavinia Rampino; Eddy Sarroff	Jennifer Horsburgh	
Division 1	Independent		Mark Hammel	Lisa Findlay	
Division 2	Independent LNP	Naomi Fowler	Ben Findlay		
Division 3	Independent		**Donna Gates**; Michael Banham		Tamzin Revell (Ind. UAP)
Division 4	Independent LNP	Shelley Curtis			
Division 5	Independent		**Peter Young**; Craig Bastin; Katherine Brooke; Martin Vincent		
Division 6	Independent LNP	**Brooke Patterson**	Samantha Delmege; David E. Woodley		
Division 7	Independent LNP	**Ryan Bayldon-Lumsden**; Joe Wilkinson	Bruce Byatt; Joel McInnes; Edward Sarroff; Jenna Schroeder		
Division 8	Independent LNP	**Bob La Castra**	Monique Jeremiah		
Division 9	Independent		Sarah Denny; **Glenn Tozer**		
Division 10	Independent LNP	**Darren Taylor**	Mona Hecke		
Division 11	Independent LNP	Dan Doran	Nicholas Rone		
Division 12	Independent	Luke Henderson	Nick Marshall; Cathy Osborne		
Division 13	Independent		Nikki Archer; Josh Martin		
Division 14	Independent		**Kath Down**; Gail O'Neill	Benjamin Theakstone	

== Results ==
=== Mayor ===
2024 Queensland mayoral elections: Gold Coast
Party	Candidate	Votes	%	±%
Independent LNP	Tom Tate	170,150	51.82	−3.91
Independent	Eddy Sarroff	68,061	20.73	+20.73
Independent	Danielle Dunsmore	25,983	7.91	+7.91
Animal Justice	Jennifer Horsburgh	18,130	5.52	+5.52
Independent	Rosie Foster	14,642	4.46	+4.46
Independent	Lavinia Rampino	9,137	2.78	+2.78
Independent LNP	Virginia Freebody	7,800	2.38	−3.23
Independent	Brett Lambert	7,581	2.31	−3.97
Independent	Gary Pead	6,846	2.09	−0.43
Total formal votes		328,330	95.45	+0.86
Informal votes		15,641	4.55	−0.86
Turnout		343,971	79.94	+5.82
Two-candidate-preferred result
Independent LNP	Tom Tate	177,666	66.32	−0.61
Independent	Eddy Sarroff	90,218	33.68	+33.68
Independent LNP hold				

=== Councillors ===
2024 Queensland local elections: Gold Coast
Party	Votes	%	Swing	Seats	Change
Independent	202,972	66.98		7	
Independent LNP	89,919	29.67		7	
Animal Justice	7,942	2.62		0	Steady
Independent UAP	2,222	0.73		0	Steady

=== Division 1 ===
2024 Queensland local elections: Division 1
Party	Candidate	Votes	%	±%
Independent	Mark Hammel	19,347	76.91	+31.12
Animal Justice	Lisa Findlay	5,810	23.09	
Turnout		26,281	77.80	
Independent hold		Swing		

=== Division 2 ===
2024 Queensland local elections: Division 2
Party	Candidate	Votes	%	±%
Independent LNP	Naomi Fowler	18,734	73.35	
Independent	Ben Findlay	6,807	26.65	
Turnout		26,535	81.97	
Independent LNP hold		Swing		

- Incumbent councillor William Owen-Jones (Independent LNP) did not recontest.

=== Division 3 ===
2024 Queensland local elections: Division 3
Party	Candidate	Votes	%	±%
Independent	Donna Gates	15,852	68.01	−8.12
Independent	Michael Banham	5,233	22.45	
Independent UAP	Tamzin Revell	2,222	9.53	
Turnout		24,553	77.15	
Independent hold		Swing		

=== Division 4 ===
2024 Queensland local elections: Division 4
Party	Candidate	Votes	%	±%
Independent LNP	Shelley Curtis	unopposed		
Turnout				
Independent LNP hold		Swing	N/A	

- Incumbent councillor Cameron Caldwell (Independent LNP) did not recontest after winning the 2023 Fadden by-election.

=== Division 5 ===
2024 Queensland local elections: Division 5
Party	Candidate	Votes	%	±%
Independent	Peter Young	15,349	61.83	
Independent	Martin Vincent	5,106	20.57	
Independent	Katherine Brooke	3,797	15.29	
Independent	Craig Bastin	574	2.31	
Turnout		26,104	82.33	
Independent hold		Swing		

=== Division 6 ===
2024 Queensland local elections: Division 6
Party	Candidate	Votes	%	±%
Independent LNP	Brooke Patterson	10,820	50.81	+11.54
Independent	Samantha Delmege	8,422	39.55	
Independent	David E. Woodley	2,055	9.65	
Turnout		22,274	76.52	
Independent LNP hold		Swing		

=== Division 7 ===
2024 Queensland local elections: Division 7
Party	Candidate	Votes	%	±%
Independent LNP	Joe Wilkinson	5,882	24.32	
Independent	Jenna Schroeder	5,311	21.96	
Independent LNP	Ryan Bayldon-Lumsden	5,234	21.64	−39.59
Independent	Joel McInnes	3,285	13.58	
Independent	Edward Sarroff	3,016	12.47	
Independent	Bruce Byatt	1,460	6.04	
Turnout		25,426	80.64	
Two-candidate-preferred result
Independent LNP	Joe Wilkinson	8,410	53.22	
Independent	Jenna Schroeder	7,392	46.78	
Independent LNP gain from Independent LNP		Swing		

=== Division 8 ===
2024 Queensland local elections: Division 8
Party	Candidate	Votes	%	±%
Independent LNP	Bob La Castra	14,463	64.93	+12.34
Independent	Monique Jeremiah	7,813	35.07	
Turnout		23,332	80.92	
Independent LNP hold		Swing		

=== Division 9 ===
2024 Queensland local elections: Division 9
Party	Candidate	Votes	%	±%
Independent	Glenn Tozer	16,589	69.09	+8.70
Independent	Sarah Denny	7,422	30.91	
Turnout		24,947	83.18	
Independent hold		Swing		

- Incumbent councillor Glenn Tozer was elected as Independent LNP but left the LNP in June 2020.

=== Division 10 ===
2024 Queensland local elections: Division 10
Party	Candidate	Votes	%	±%
Independent LNP	Darren Taylor	14,196	60.48	+9.82
Independent	Mona Hecke	9,279	39.52	
Turnout		24,523	75.91	
Independent LNP hold		Swing		

=== Division 11 ===
2024 Queensland local elections: Division 11
Party	Candidate	Votes	%	±%
Independent LNP	Dan Doran	14,189	60.65	
Independent LNP	Nicholas Rone	9,207	39.35	
Turnout		24,798	80.46	
Independent LNP hold		Swing		

- Incumbent councillor Hermann Vorster (Independent LNP) did not recontest.

=== Division 12 ===
2024 Queensland local elections: Division 12
Party	Candidate	Votes	%	±%
Independent	Nick Marshall	8,392	37.73	
Independent	Cathy Osborne	7,450	33.49	+5.53
Independent LNP	Luke Henderson	6,401	28.78	
Turnout		23,228	78.73	
Independent hold		Swing		

- Incumbent councillor Pauline Young (Independent) did not recontest.

=== Division 13 ===
2024 Queensland local elections: Division 13
Party	Candidate	Votes	%	±%
Independent	Josh Martin	12,015	54.84	
Independent	Nikki Archer	9,896	45.16	
Turnout		23,050	78.01	
Independent hold		Swing		

- Incumbent councillor Daphne McDonald (Independent) did not recontest.

=== Division 14 ===
2024 Queensland local elections: Division 14
Party	Candidate	Votes	%	±%
Independent	Gail O'Neill	9,844	45.94	−16.41
Independent	Kath Down	9,451	44.11	
Animal Justice	Benjamin Theakstone	2,132	9.95	
Turnout		22,618	77.05	
Independent hold		Swing		

== See also ==
- 2024 Queensland local elections
- 2024 Queensland mayoral elections
- 2024 Brisbane City Council election
- 2024 Townsville City Council election
