= Daniel Doran =

Daniel Doran may refer to:

- Daniel Doran (cricketer)
- Daniel Doran (figure skater)
