= Keith Hunt =

Keith Hunt may refer to:

- Keith Hunt, character on Knowing Me Knowing You with Alan Partridge (TV series)
- Keith Hunt (politician) on the list of mayors of the Gold Coast, Australia
