= Daniel Doran (cricketer) =

Australian politician

Councillor of the City of Gold Coast for Division 11
- Incumbent
- Assumed office 16 March 2024
- Preceded by: Hermann Vorster

Personal details
- Born: Daniel John Doran; 18 June 1981 (age 45) Hobart, Tasmania, Australia
- Party: Liberal National
- Nickname(s): Doors
- Cricket career

Personal information
- Height: 1.80 m (5 ft 11 in)
- Batting: Right-handed
- Bowling: Legbreak googly
- Role: Bowler

Domestic team information
- Years: Team
- 2005/06–2009/10: Queensland
- First-class debut: 15 January 2006 Queensland v Western Australia
- Last First-class: 27 November 2009 Queensland v Victoria

Career statistics
Competition	First-class
Matches	32
Runs scored	567
Batting average	17.71
100s/50s	0/1
Top score	61
Balls bowled	3470
Wickets	43
Bowling average	63.74
5 wickets in innings	0
10 wickets in match	0
Best bowling	3/33
Catches/stumpings	9/0
- Source: CricketArchive, 7 November 2011

Daniel John Doran (born 18 June 1981) is an Australian politician and cricketer who currently serves as the councillor for Division 11 on the City of Gold Coast. He formerly played for Queensland in Australian domestic cricket as a right-arm leg break bowler.

== Cricket career ==
Doran made his first-class debut in 2005–06 against Western Australia and took five wickets. Despite starting the season without a rookie contract, he ended it with a Pura Cup trophy and a place at the Academy. He got 3 wickets in the batting dominated final, including the vital wicket of David Hussey with his first ball of the second innings. His figures for the summer were 15 wickets at 28.46.

In grade cricket Doran plays for Gold Coast, with coach Ross Wallace describing him as the best leg spinner he had ever seen and a "very good captain who displayed leadership skills beyond the Grade Cricket level."

== Political career ==
In January 2024, Doran joined the Liberal National Party and announced his candidacy for the 2024 Gold Coast City Council election, although he ran as an Independent LNP candidate as he was not endorsed by any party.

Doran was elected to Division 11 with 60.65% of the vote.
