= Ryan Bayldon-Lumsden =

Australian politician

Councillor of the City of Gold Coast for Division 7
- In office 28 March 2020 – 16 March 2024
- Preceded by: Gary Baildon
- Succeeded by: Joe Wilkinson

Personal details
- Born: 23 September 1992 (age 34)
- Party: Liberal National (2010−present)

Ryan Donald Bayldon-Lumsden (born 23 September 1992) is an Australian former politician who served as a member of the Gold Coast City Council from 2020 until 2024. He was suspended from council on 15 September 2023 after being charged with the murder of his stepfather.

Bayldon-Lumsden ran for re-election at the 2024 Gold Coast City Council election but was unsuccessful, coming third on first preferences with 21.72% of the vote. Former Liberal National Party staffer Joe Wilkinson was elected in a tight three-way race.

== Political career ==
Before entering politics, Bayldon-Lumsden was a secondary school teacher at The Southport School. He was also awarded a Queensland Young Volunteer Award for 2009, for his involvement in community programs which were run through Family Support Group Australia.

He was elected to Division 7 at the 2020 Gold Coast City Council election at the age of 27, making him the youngest person elected to the role in the city's history.

Following his suspension on 15 September 2023 Bayldon-Lumsden ran for re-election in the 2024 Gold Coast City Council election, however was ultimately unsuccessful.

== Arrest and murder charge ==
On 23 August 2023, Bayldon-Lumsden was charged by Queensland Police with the murder of his stepfather, 58-year-old Robert Lumsden.

Police had been called to the property following reports of a disturbance. Bayldon-Lumsden was arrested at the property.
