= 2020 Queensland local elections =

- 28 March 2020
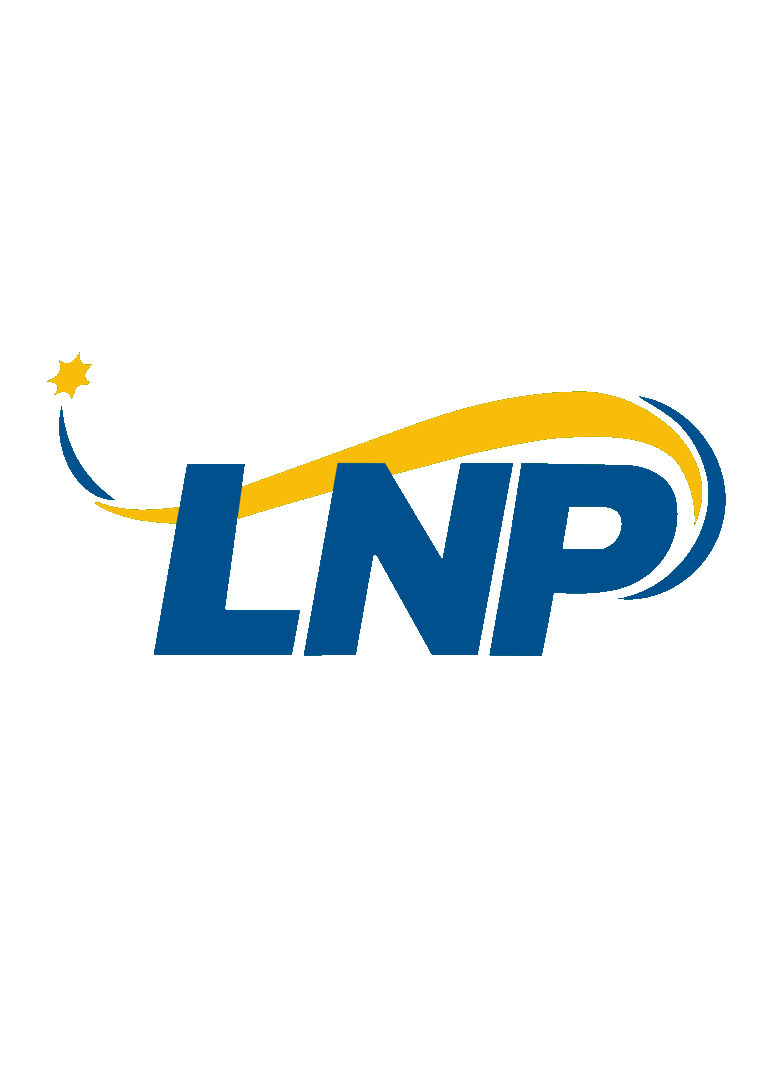

	First party	Second party	Third party
	IND
Leader	N/A	N/A	N/A
Party	Independents	Liberal National	Labor
Last election		19	5
Seats before		18	5
Seats won	424	19	5
Seat change		▲1	Steady
Popular vote	954,307	279,793	200,428
Percentage	41.72%	12.23%	8.76%
	Fourth party	Fifth party	Sixth party
		NQSA	AJP
Leader	No leader	Peter Raffles	No leader
Party	Greens	NQ State Alliance	Animal Justice
Last election	1	Did not exist	0
Seats before	1	0	0
Seats won	1	0	0
Seat change	Steady	Steady	Steady
Popular vote	141,006	12,469	10,665
	Seventh party	Eighth party	Ninth party
	LDP	ABF	WHIG
Leader	No leader	No leader	Mike Jessop
Party	Liberal Democrats	Better Families	Whig
Last election	0	0	0
Seats before	0	1	0
Seats won	0	0	0
Seat change	Steady	▼1	Steady
Popular vote	7,433	2,395	1,825
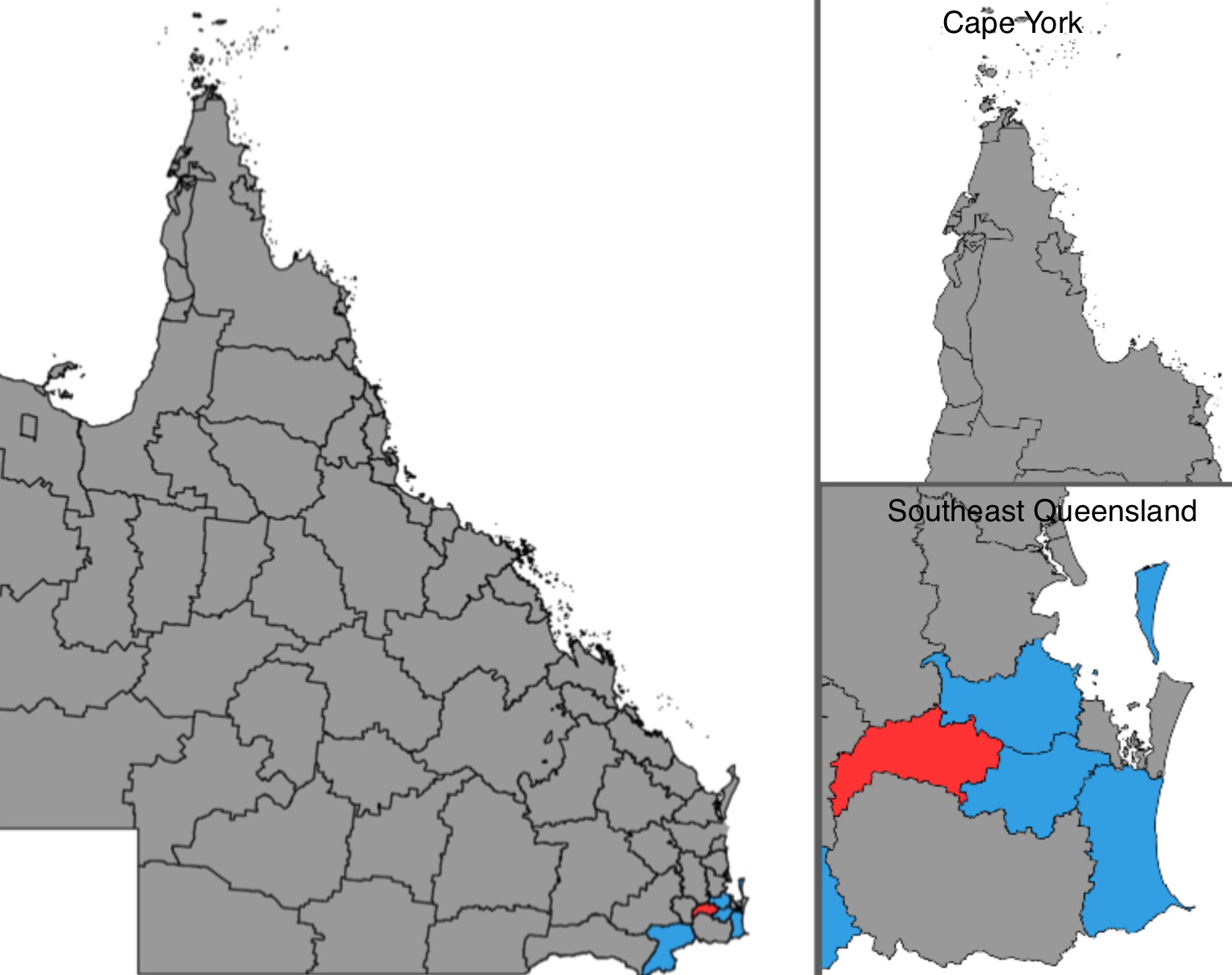
- Results by LGA

The 2020 Queensland local elections were held on 28 March 2020 to elect the mayors and councils of the 77 local government areas in Queensland, Australia.

The elections were held in the early stages of the COVID-19 pandemic, and on the same day as the state by-elections in Bundamba and Currumbin.

== Electoral systems ==
=== Mayors and single-member wards ===
All 77 councils use optional preferential voting (OPV) for mayoral elections. Under OPV, voters are only required to vote for one candidates, although they can choose to preference other candidates.

In the 22 councils that use single-member wards (including Brisbane and the Gold Coast) OPV is also used.

=== Multi-member wards ===
In July 2019, it was announced that the 10 single-member wards on Ipswich City Council would be replaced by four two-member wards, reducing the total amount of councillors to eight.

No form of preferential voting is in place, with plurality block voting (also referred to as first-past-the-post by the Electoral Commission) is instead used, where voters are only required to mark the same amount of candidates as there are positions to be elected − in the case of Ipswich, two candidates.

=== Undivided councils ===
54 councils are undivided, meaning they do not use any forms of wards and all councillors are elected in a single area representing the entire LGA.

Plurality block voting is used for these councils.

== Party changes before elections ==
A number of councillors joined or left parties before the 2024 elections.

Council	Ward	Councillor	Former party	New party	Date
Rockhampton	Mayor	Margaret Strelow	Independent Labor	Independent	6 November 2017
Ipswich	Mayor	Andrew Antoniolli	Independent Labor	Independent	3 May 2018
Ipswich	Division 4	Kylie Stoneman	Independent Labor	Independent	1 August 2018
Redland	Division 9	Paul Gleeson	Independent	Better Families	28 March 2019
Townsville	Division 2	Paul Jacob	Team Jenny Hill	Independent	2019
Maranoa	Mayor	Tyson Golder	Independent	Unity Maranoa	22 February 2020
Gympie	Division 2	Glen Hartwig	Katter's Australian	Independent	3 March 2020
Brisbane	Pullenvale	Kate Richards	Liberal National	Independent	2020

== Political parties ==
Queensland councils are largely non-partisan. Most wards are not contested by political parties and are rarely successful when they do. The sole exception to this is Brisbane, which is contested by the Liberal National Party, Labor and the Greens. The Greens also contested several seats in other LGAs, though none of their candidates outside Brisbane were elected. There are also a number of councillors and candidates who are members of political parties but ran as independents.

Minor parties including the Animal Justice Party and the Liberal Democrats also contested the elections. There are also a number of local parties that operate exclusively within a single LGA.

The North Queensland State Alliance, which advocates for the creation of the State of North Queensland, ran two separate party tickets − Cairns N.Q.S.A. Team (5,775 votes) and TSV Team NQ State Alliance (6,694 votes). No candidates from either ticket were elected.

== Results ==
Party	Votes	%	Swing	Seats	Change
Independents	954,307	41.72		424	
Liberal National	279,793	12.23		19	Steady
Greg Williamson Alliance	272,691	11.92		6	
Labor	200,428	8.76		5	Steady
Independent Liberal National	169,364	7.40		15	▼5
Greens	141,006	6.16		1	Steady
Independent Labor	79,606	3.48		7	▼2
Team Jenny Hill	44,715	1.95		9	
Christensen & Keioskie	43,781	1.91		0	Steady
Cairns Unity	26,395	1.15		6	Steady
Future Noosa	25,280	1.11		1	
Our Team 4 Your Shire	24,973	1.09		3	
Progress Mount Isa	20,155	0.88		5	▲5
Your Voice Of Experience	18,917	0.83		2	
Unity Maranoa	16,546	0.72		4	
Mount Isa Community Team	15,571	0.68		0	Steady
North Queensland State Alliance	12,469	0.55		0	Steady
It's Time for Townsville	12,375	0.54		0	
Animal Justice	10,665	0.47		0	Steady
Our Voice	10,587	0.46		0	
Team WORK	7,483	0.33		0	
Liberal Democrats	7,433	0.32		0	Steady
Locals United - Back to Basics	5,128	0.22		0	Steady
Independent Socialist	4,428	0.19		1	▲1
Logan Needs Moore	4,362	0.19		0	Steady
Independent One Nation	3,928	0.17		1	Steady
Better Families	2,395	0.10		0	Steady
Whig	1,825	0.08		0	Steady
Independent United Australia	1,352	0.06		0	Steady
Civil Liberties & Motorists	586	0.03		0	Steady
Team Josh Weazel	410	0.02		2	
Independent Katter's Australian	409	0.02		1	▼1
Total (Note: Most local councils are undivided, meaning the total number of votes is greater than the total number of ballots. This row lists the number of ballots.)	2,287,588	94.55		512	
Invalid/blank votes	131,775	5.45		–	–
Turnout	2,419,363	77.28		–	–
Registered voters	3,130,716	–	–	–	–

== See also ==
- 2020 Brisbane City Council election
- 2020 Gold Coast City Council election
- 2020 Townsville City Council election
