= City of Gold Coast =

Coordinates: 28°00′04″S 153°25′42″E

- Local government area
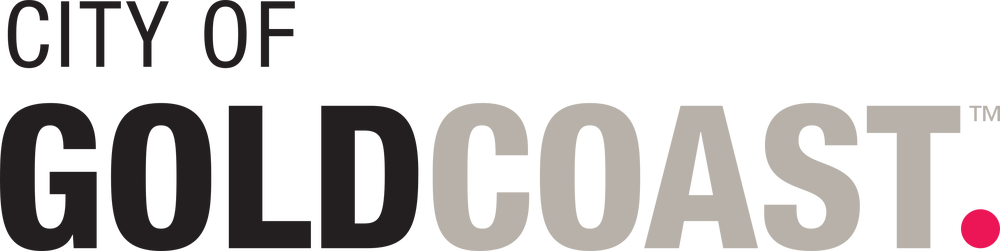
- Coat of arms Council logo

- Map of the City of Gold Coast in Queensland
- Interactive map of City of Gold Coast
- Country: Australia
- State: Queensland
- Region: South East Queensland
- Established: 9 December 1948; 77 years ago
- City status: 16 May 1959; 67 years ago
- Council seat: Surfers Paradise

Government
  - Type: Mayor–council
  - Body: Gold Coast City Council
  - Mayor: Tom Tate (Independent LNP)

Area
  - Total: 1,334 km^{2} (515 sq mi)

Population (2021)
  - Total: 625,087
  - Density: 468.6/km^{2} (1,214/sq mi)
- Time zone: UTC+10:00 (AEST)
- Website: www.goldcoast.qld.gov.au/Home

The City of Gold Coast is the local government area spanning the Gold Coast, Queensland, Australia, and surrounding areas. It is on the central eastern coast of Australia adjoining the Pacific Ocean. With a population of 606,774, it is the second most populous local government area in the state of Queensland (Brisbane being the largest). Its council maintains a staff of over 2,500. The council was established in 1948, and has existed in its present form since 2008. The City of Gold Coast borders New South Wales and Tweed Shire to the south, Scenic Rim to the west, and Logan and Redland to the northwest and north, respectively.

== History ==
=== Early history ===
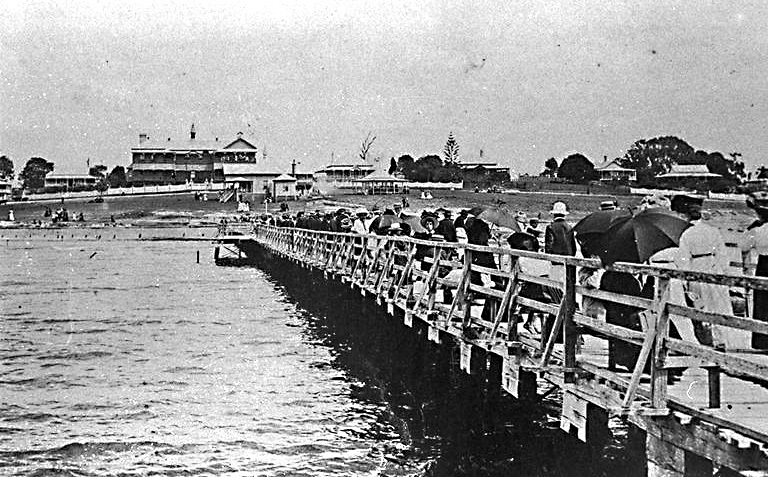
Southport Pier, 1910

By the late 1870s, the Government of Queensland had become preoccupied with the idea of getting local residents to pay through rates for local services, which had become a massive cost to the colony and were undermaintained in many areas. The McIlwraith government initiated the Divisional Boards Act 1879 which created a system of elected divisional boards covering most of Queensland. It was assented by the Governor on 2 October 1879, and on 11 November 1879, the Governor gazetted a list of 74 divisions which would come into existence. Four of these — Nerang, Coomera, Beenleigh and Waterford — were in the Gold Coast region. Southport was developed as both an administrative centre as well as a holiday destination with hotels and guesthouses to cater for visitors. Town dwellers had different needs to the rural landholders so Southport ratepayers lobbied the colonial government to create a separate Divisional Board so that rates monies raised by Southport landholders could be spent on town improvements. This resulted in the establishment of the Southport Division on 14 July 1883 by an amalgamation of part of Nerang Division and part of Coomera Division.

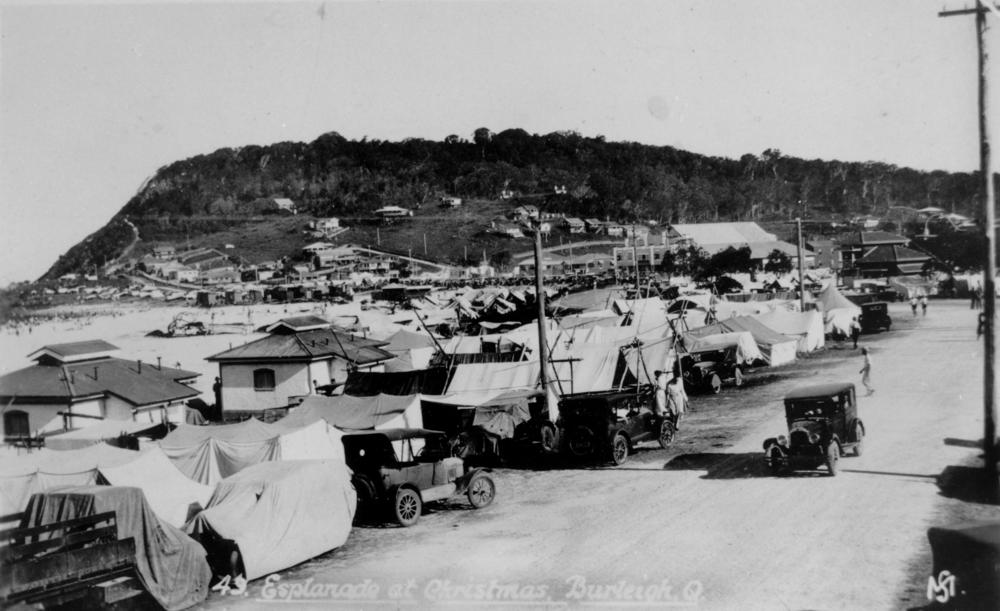
Beach foreshore at Burleigh Heads, 1932

On 31 March 1903, following the enactment of the Local Authorities Act 1902, the divisions became shires. On 12 June 1914, the Town of Coolangatta was created from part of the Shire of Nerang, and on 12 April 1918, Southport became a town.

=== Development and growth ===
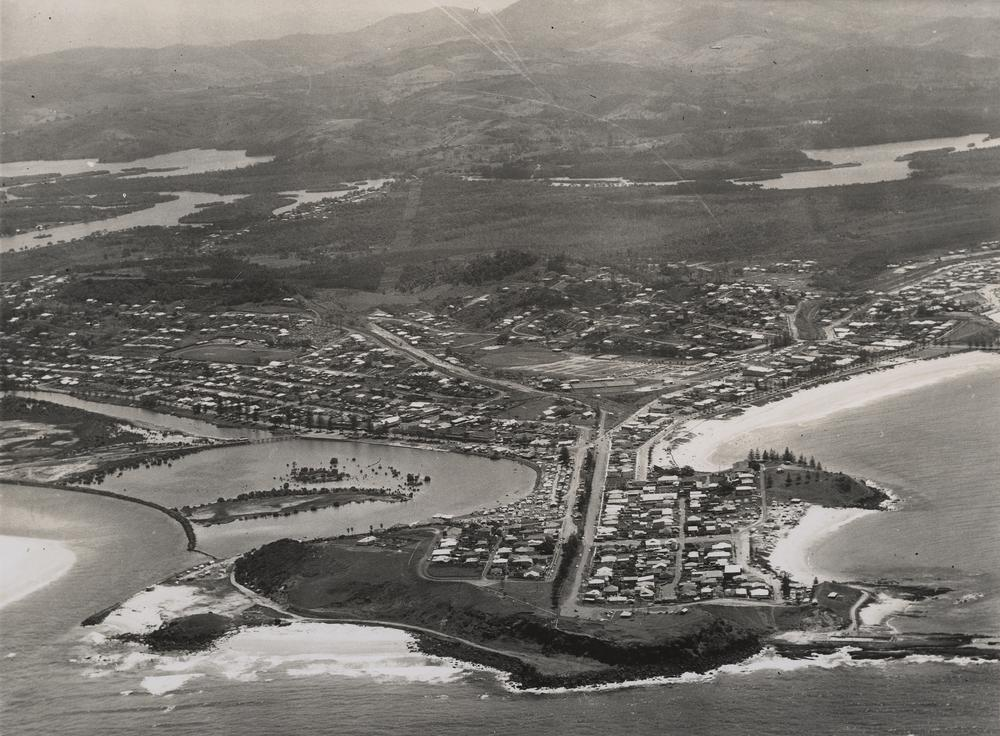
Aerial view looking towards Coolangatta and Tweed Heads, New South Wales, c. 1952

On 9 December 1948, as part of a major reorganisation of local government in South East Queensland, an Order in Council created the Town of South Coast by amalgamating Town of Southport, Town of Coolangatta and coastal sections (around Burleigh Heads) of the Shire of Nerang, creating a narrow coastal strip. The same Order abolished all of the earlier Shires and amalgamated most of their area into the new Shire of Albert, with the rest becoming part of the Shire of Beaudesert. The Order came into effect on 10 June 1949, when the first elections were held for the new councils.

On 23 October 1958, the Town of the South Coast adopted the name of Town of Gold Coast, and on 16 May 1959, the Town was proclaimed as the City of Gold Coast by the Governor of Queensland, having met the requirements for city status. Most of what is now regarded as the Gold Coast urban area was at that time located within the Shire of Albert, which had its administrative offices in Nerang-Southport Road, Nerang.

=== A regional authority ===
On 19 March 1992, the Electoral and Administrative Review Commission, created two years earlier, produced its report External Boundaries of Local Authorities, and recommended a number of changes to local government boundaries and the amalgamation of some local governments. Although their recommendations only included boundary adjustments between the Gold Coast City and Albert Shire, the outcome following much public debate was a decision by the Queensland Government to absorb Albert Shire into Gold Coast City. The Local Government (Albert, Beaudesert and Gold Coast) Regulation 1994 was gazetted on 16 December 1994, resulting in the amalgamation of the Shire of Albert into Gold Coast City at the 1995 local government elections.

In 2007, as part of a report recommending massive amalgamation of local government in Queensland, the Local Government Reform Commission recommended that the Beenleigh-Eagleby region on the Gold Coast's northern border be transferred to Logan City, on the basis that a common community of interest existed and that planning of the South East Queensland urban footprint would be made more efficient by the change. The area to be excised was estimated by the Commission to have an area of 49 km^{2} (18.9 sq mi) and a population of 40,148. The change took effect at the local government elections on 15 March 2008.

== Heritage listings ==
The Gold Coast has many heritage-listed sites, including those at:

- Currumbin
- Main Beach
- Pimpama
- Numinbah Valley
- South Stradbroke Island
- Southport
- Springbrook
- Surfers Paradise
- Tallebudgera
- Willow Vale

== Council ==
Gold Coast City Council

Leadership
- Mayor: Tom Tate, Independent LNP
- Deputy Mayor: Mark Hammel, Independent

Structure
- Seats: 15 elected representatives, including a mayor and 14 councillors
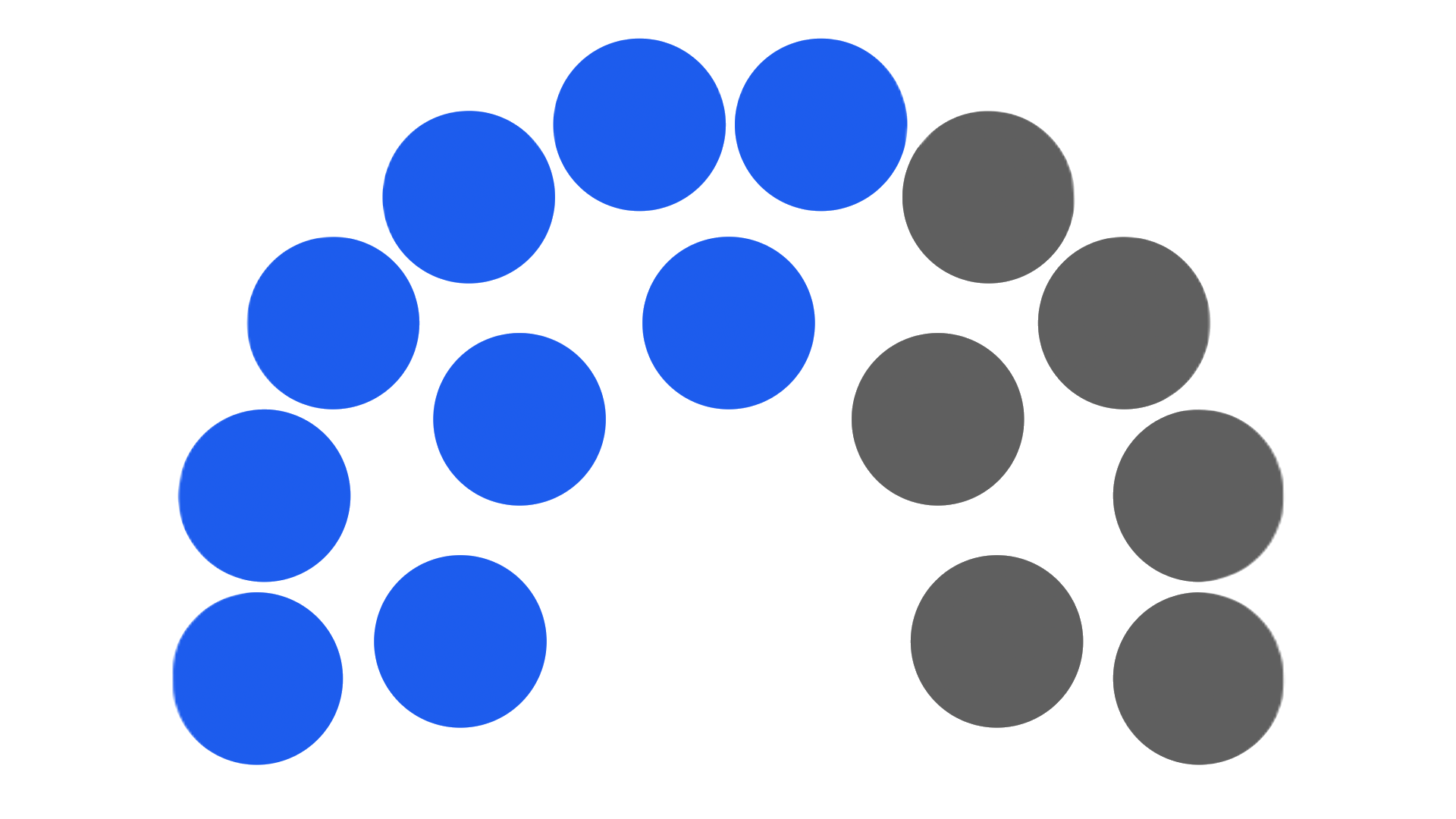
- Political groups: Independent LNP (8); Independent (7)

Elections
- Last election: 16 March 2024
- Next election: 25 March 2028

Gold Coast City Council is divided into 14 wards (known as divisions), each electing one councillor at elections held every four years. The present mayor is Tom Tate who was first elected on 28 April 2012 and re-elected in 2016, 2020 and 2024.

=== Current composition ===
The current council, elected in 2024, is:

| Ward | Councillor | Party |
|---|---|---|
| Mayor | Tom Tate | Independent LNP |
| Division 1 | Mark Hammel | Independent |
| Division 2 | Naomi Fowler | Independent LNP |
| Division 3 | Donna Gates | Independent |
| Division 4 | Shelley Curtis | Independent LNP |
| Division 5 | Peter Young | Independent |
| Division 6 | Brooke Patterson | Independent LNP |
| Division 7 | Joe Wilkinson | Independent LNP |
| Division 8 | Bob La Castra | Independent LNP |
| Division 9 | Glenn Tozer | Independent |
| Division 10 | Darren Taylor | Independent LNP |
| Division 11 | Dan Doran | Independent LNP |
| Division 12 | Nick Marshall | Independent |
| Division 13 | Josh Martin | Independent |
| Division 14 | Gail O’Neill | Independent |

== Past councillors ==
=== 2016−present ===
| Year | Div 1 | Div 2 | Div 3 | Div 4 | Div 5 | Div 6 | Div 7 | Div 8 | Div 9 | Div 10 | Div 11 | Div 12 | Div 13 | Div 14 |
| Year | Councillor | Councillor | Councillor | Councillor | Councillor | Councillor | Councillor | Councillor | Councillor | Councillor | Councillor | Councillor | Councillor | Councillor |
|---|---|---|---|---|---|---|---|---|---|---|---|---|---|---|
| 2016 | Donna Gates (Ind.) | William Owen Jones (Ind. LNP) | Cameron Caldwell (Ind. LNP) | Kristyn Boulton (Ind.) | Peter Young (Ind.) | Dawn Crichlow (Ind.) | Gary Baildon (Ind.) | Bob La Castra (Ind. LNP) | Glenn Tozer (Ind. LNP/Ind.) | Paul Taylor (Ind. LNP) | Hermann Vorster (Ind. LNP) | Pauline Young (Ind.) | Daphne McDonald (Ind.) | Gail O'Neill (Ind.) |
| 2020 | Mark Hammel (Ind.) | William Owen Jones (Ind. LNP) | Donna Gates (Ind.) | Cameron Caldwell (Ind. LNP) | Peter Young (Ind.) | Brooke Patterson (Ind. LNP) | Ryan Bayldon-Lumsden (Ind. LNP) | Bob La Castra (Ind. LNP) | Glenn Tozer (Ind. LNP/Ind.) | Darren Taylor (Ind. LNP) | Hermann Vorster (Ind. LNP) | Pauline Young (Ind.) | Daphne McDonald (Ind.) | Gail O'Neill (Ind.) |
| 2020 | Mark Hammel (Ind.) | William Owen Jones (Ind. LNP) | Donna Gates (Ind.) | Cameron Caldwell (Ind. LNP) | Peter Young (Ind.) | Brooke Patterson (Ind. LNP) | Ryan Bayldon-Lumsden (Ind. LNP) | Bob La Castra (Ind. LNP) | Glenn Tozer (Ind. LNP/Ind.) | Darren Taylor (Ind. LNP) | Hermann Vorster (Ind. LNP) | Pauline Young (Ind.) | Daphne McDonald (Ind.) | Gail O'Neill (Ind.) |
| 2024 | Mark Hammel (Ind.) | Naomi Fowler (Ind. LNP) | Donna Gates (Ind.) | Shelley Curtis (Ind. LNP) | Peter Young (Ind.) | Brooke Patterson (Ind. LNP) | Joe Wilkinson (Ind. LNP) | Bob La Castra (Ind. LNP) | Glenn Tozer (Ind. LNP/Ind.) | Darren Taylor (Ind. LNP) | Dan Doran (Ind. LNP) | Nick Marshall (Ind.) | Josh Martin (Ind.) | Gail O'Neill (Ind.) |

== Election results ==
=== 2024 ===
2024 Queensland local elections: Gold Coast
| Party | Votes | % | Swing | Seats | Change |
|---|---|---|---|---|---|
| Independent | 202,972 | 66.98 | | 7 | |
| Independent LNP | 89,919 | 29.67 | | 7 | |
| Animal Justice | 7,942 | 2.62 | | 0 | Steady |
| Independent UAP | 2,222 | 0.73 | | 0 | Steady |

== Population ==
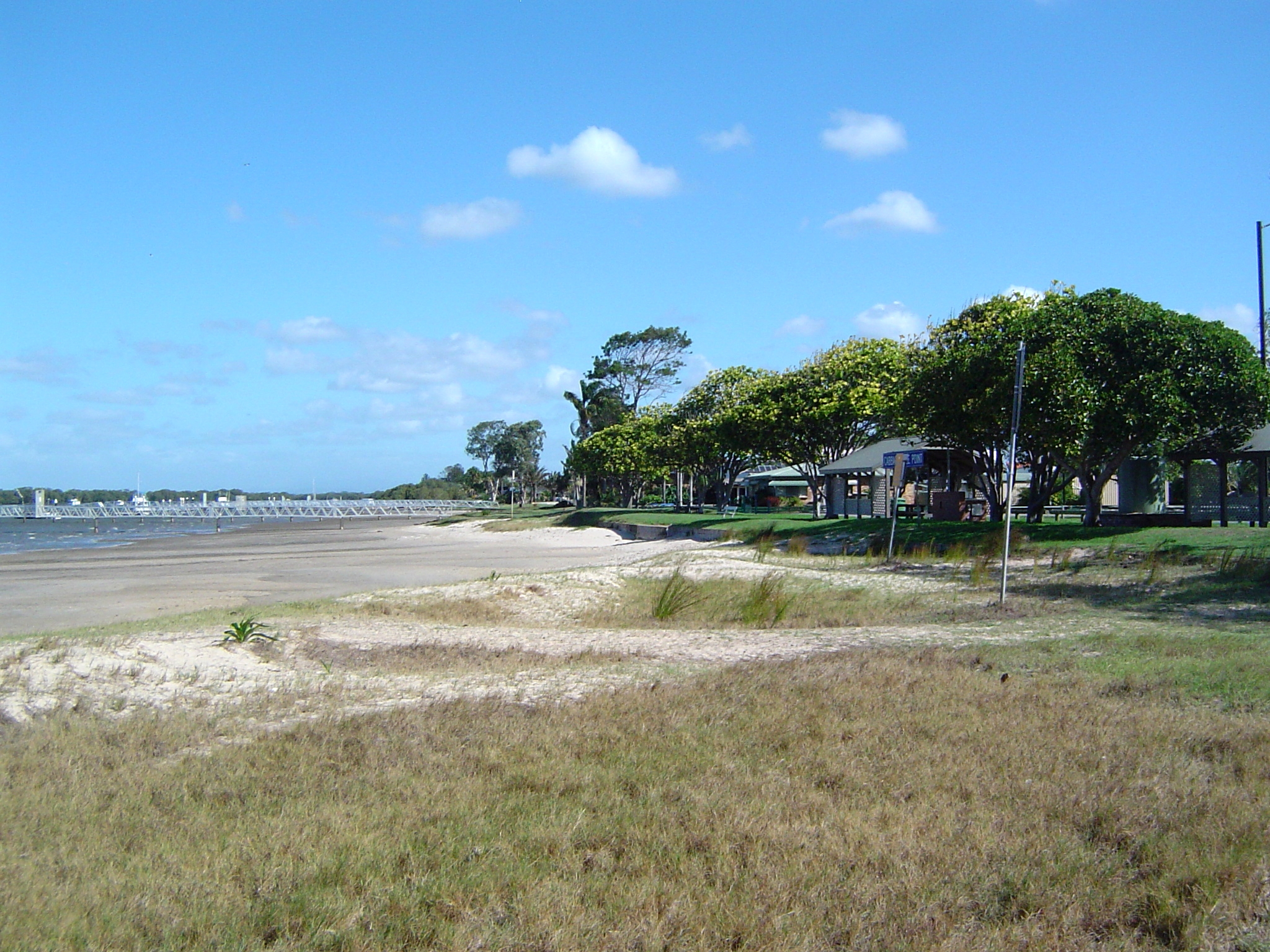
Beach foreshore at Steiglitz, 2014

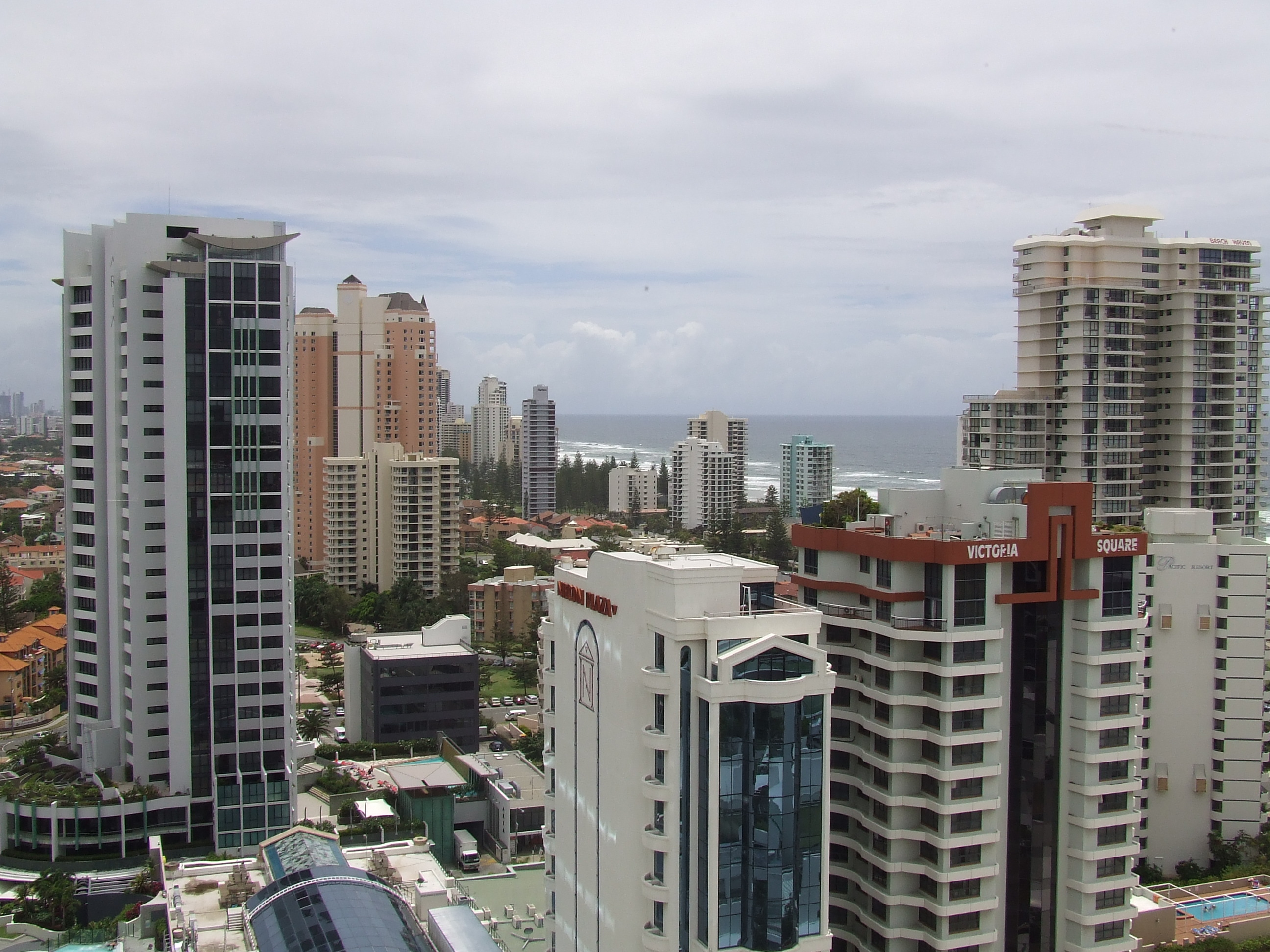
Highrises at Broadbeach, 2008

Populations are provided below for the Gold Coast (Southport/Coolangatta, South Coast, Gold Coast) and Albert entities. As Albert included the entire Logan City area prior to 1978, figures are only provided from the 1976 census.

| Year | Population (Gold Coast) | Annual growth (%) | Population (Albert) | Annual growth (%) |
|---|---|---|---|---|
| 1933 | 6,046 | N/A | | |
| 1947 | 13,888 | 6.12 | | |
| 1954 | 19,807 | 5.20 | | |
| 1961 | 33,716 | 7.90 | | |
| 1966 | 49,481 | 7.97 | 6,437 | N/A |
| 1971 | 66,697 | 6.15 | 10,165 | 9.57 |
| 1976 | 87,510 | 5.58 | 24,268 | 19.01 |
| 1981 | 117,824 | 6.13 | 54,870 | 17.72 |
| 1986 | 130,304 | 2.03 | 92,766 | 11.07 |
| 1991 | 157,857 | 3.91 | 143,697 | 9.15 |

| Year | Population | Annual growth (%) |
|---|---|---|
| 1991 | 301,554 | 6.21 |
| 1996 | 375,175 | 4.47 |
| 2001 | 441,736 | 3.32 |
| 2006 | 507,876 | 2.83 |
| 2011 | 494,501 | Beenleigh left in deamalgamation |
| 2016 | 551,721 | 2.49 |

== Demographics ==
Selected historical census data for City of Gold Coast local government area
| Census year | | 2001 | 2006 | 2011 | 2016 |
|---|---|---|---|---|---|
| Population | Estimated residents on census night | 426,661 | 472,279 | 494,501 | 555,721 |
| Population | LGA rank in terms of size within Queensland | | 2nd | 2nd | 2nd |
| Population | % of Queensland population | 11.9% | ▲12.1% | ▼11.41% | ▲11.82% |
| Population | % of Australian population | 2.27% | ▲2.38% | ▼2.3% | ▲2.38% |
| Dwelling structure | | | | | |
| Dwelling type | Separate house | 58.5% | ▲58.9% | ▲60.4% | ▼58.3% |
| Dwelling type | Semi-detached, terrace or townhouse | 16.0% | ▲16.6% | ▲18.8% | ▲20.6% |
| Dwelling type | Flat or apartment | 22.1% | ▲22.6% | ▼19.6% | ▲19.9% |

== Libraries ==
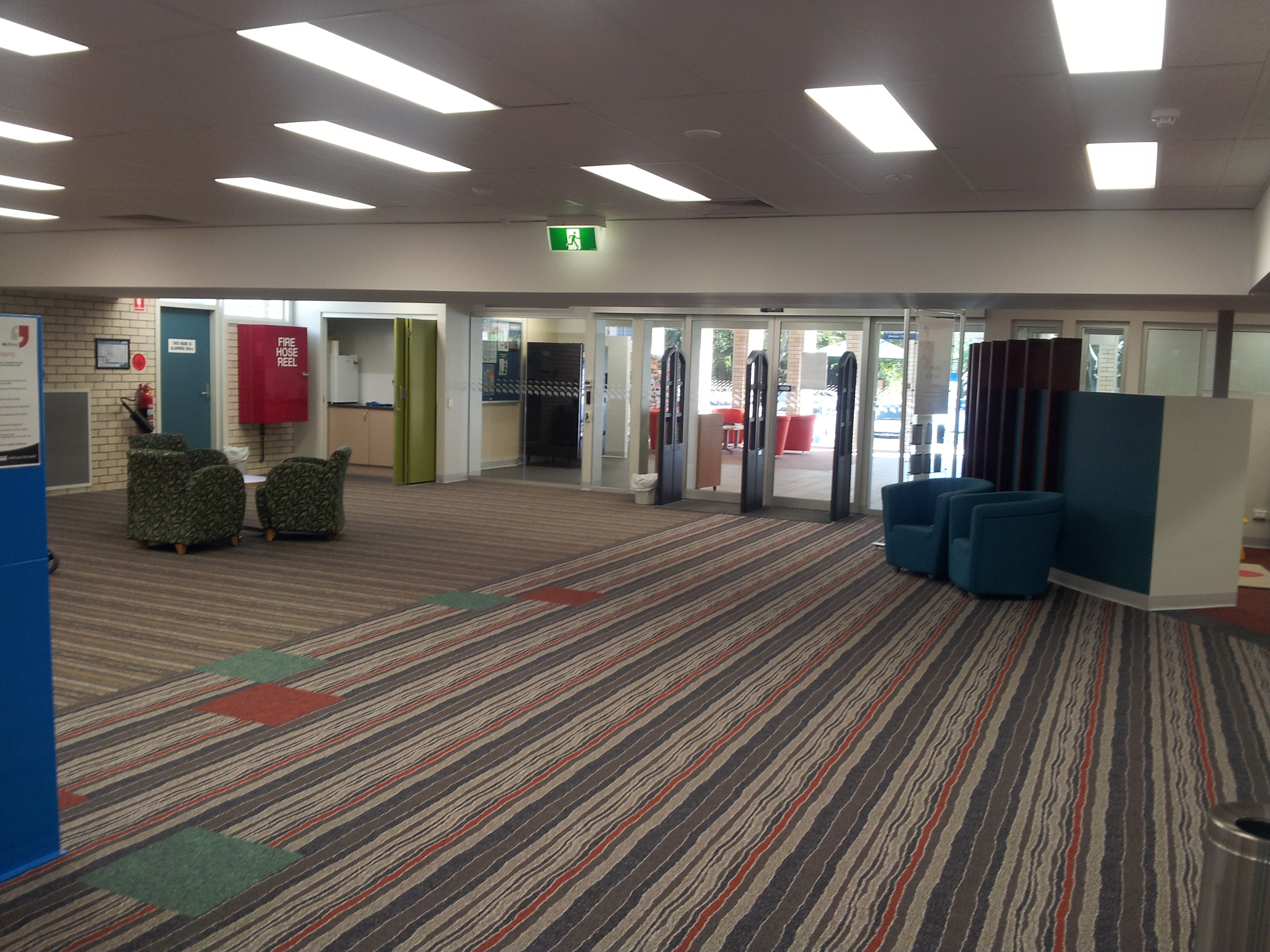
Palm Beach Community Lounge

The first municipal library on the Gold Coast opened in the Southport Town Hall on 30 April 1958. Prior to this, a series of School of arts and private circulating libraries had supported the communities' and visitors' recreational and educational reading needs.

The City of Gold Coast has 12 libraries at Broadbeach, Burleigh Heads, Burleigh Waters, Coolangatta, Elanora, Helensvale, Mermaid Waters, Nerang, Palm Beach, Robina, Runaway Bay, Southport and Upper Coomera. There is a special needs library within Nerang Library and a Local Studies Library (on the first floor of Southport Library). The council also operates a mobile library service.

In 2018, the mobile library provides a fortnight service to Alberton, Ashmore, Benowa, Bonogin, Cedar Creek, Coomera, Currumbin Valley, Gilston, Jacobs Well, Mudgeeraba, Ormeau (4 visits), Paradise Point, Pimpama (3 visits), Tugun, Steiglitz, Tallebudgera Valley, and Woongoolba. The Gold Coast City Library is a member of the Queensland Public Libraries Association.

== Key projects ==
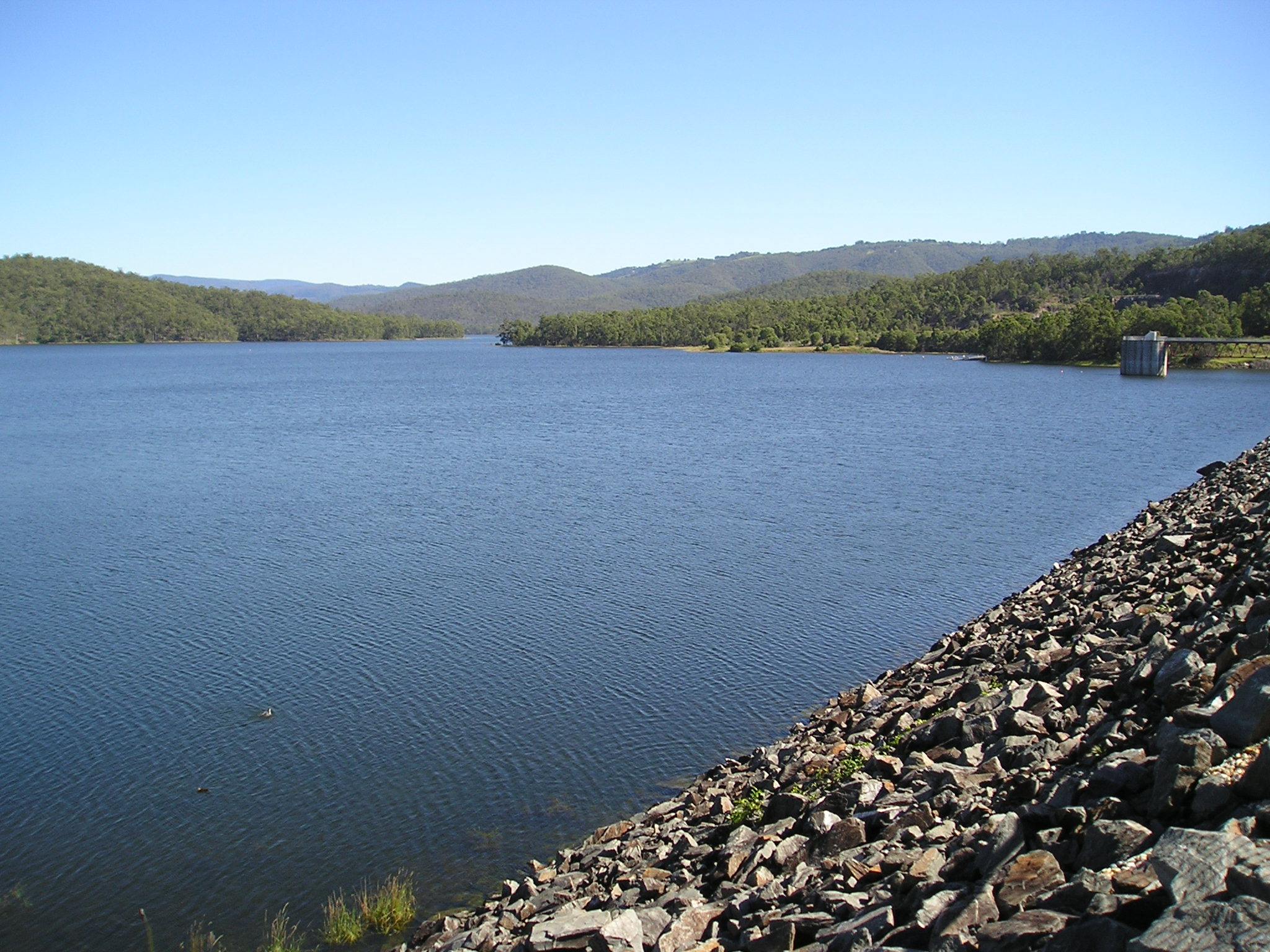
Hinze Dam was upgraded in 2011

- Gold Coast University Hospital
- Gold Coast Desalination Plant
- Raising of Hinze Dam
- Southport Broadwater Parklands
- G:link
- Gold Coast Ferry Service
- Gold Coast Regional Botanic Gardens
- Evandale Cultural Precinct including the Home of The Arts cultural centre and a greenbridge from Evandale Parklands to Chevron Island
- Mermaid Waters Library
- Gold Coast Shoreline Management Plan

== Notable personnel ==
Notable people who work for or who have worked for the City of Gold Coast include:

- Guillermo Capati PSM, (1994–2017), managed the city's water and wastewater needs, long-term water planning and recycled water. Capati was awarded a Public Service Medal (PSM) during the 2013 Australia Day Honours for outstanding public service to the sustainable water future of the Gold Coast and broader South East Queensland region.
- Ryan Bayldon-Lumsden, (born 23 September 1992), was elected as Division 7 Councillor in the 2020 Gold Coast City Council election at the age of 27, making him the youngest person elected to the role in the city's history. Before entering politics, Bayldon-Lumsden was awarded a Queensland Young Volunteer Award for 2009, for his involvement in community programs run through Family Support Group Australia and was also a secondary school teacher at The Southport School. On 23 August 2023, Bayldon-Lumsden was charged by Queensland Police with the murder of his stepfather, 58-year-old Robert Lumsden, following the charge he was suspended as Councillor pending the verdict of the charge and unsuccessfully ran for re-election in the 2024 Gold Coast City Council election.

== International relations ==
The City of Gold Coast has relationships with the following cities and regions:

- Beihai, China
- Chengdu, China
- Da Nang, Vietnam
- Dubai, United Arab Emirates
- Fort Lauderdale, United States
- Jining, China
- Kanagawa Prefecture, Japan
- Netanya, Israel
- Nouméa, New Caledonia
- Saint-Denis, France
- Tainan, Taiwan
- Taipei, Taiwan
- Takasu, Japan
- Wuhan, China
- Zhuhai, China

== See also ==
- Gold Coast Art Centre
- Gold Coast City Art Gallery
- List of Gold Coast suburbs
