= Tom Tate =

Australian politician and businessman (born 1959)

Mayor Tom Tate
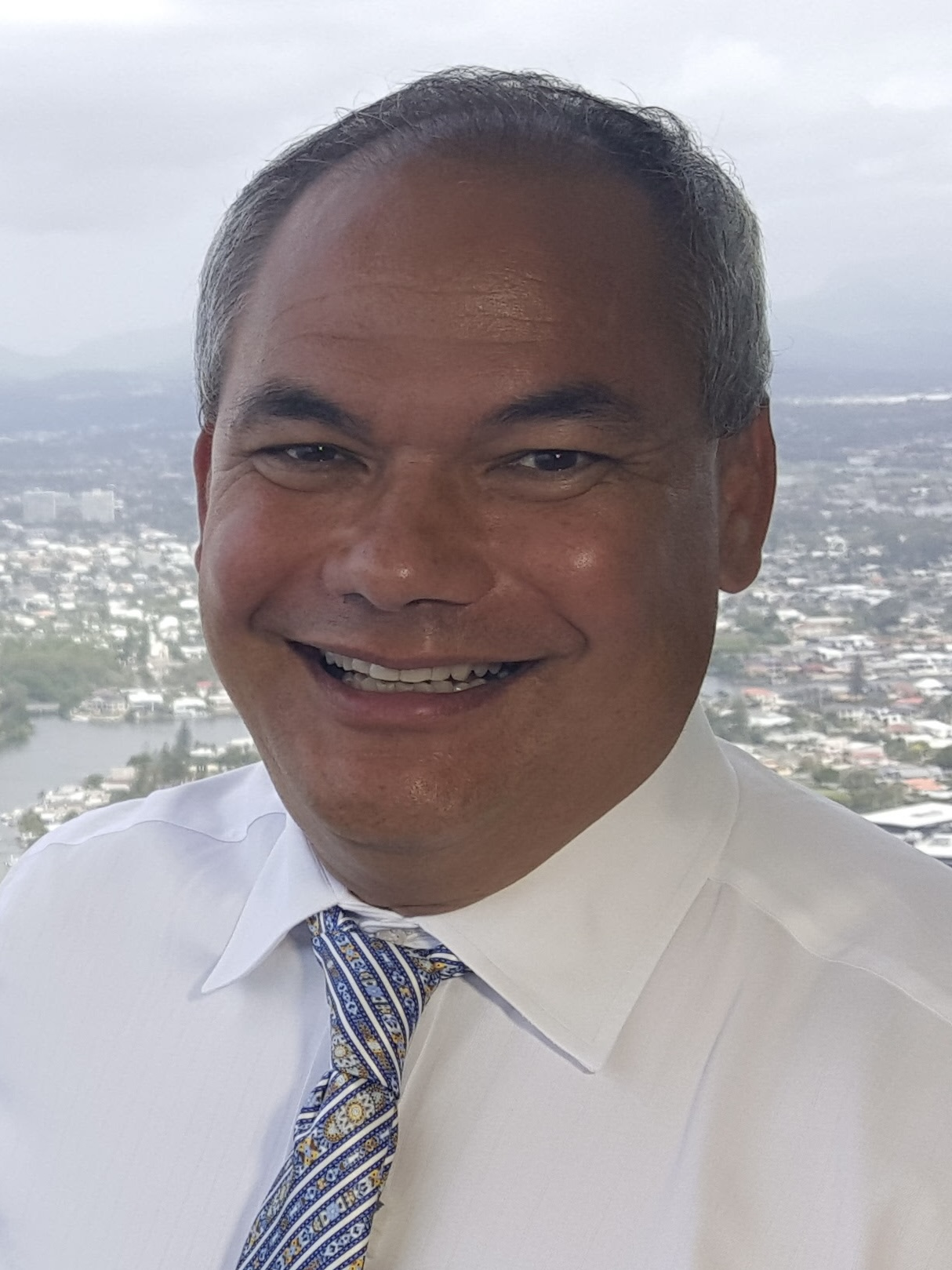
- Tate in March 2016

13th Mayor of the Gold Coast
- Incumbent
- Assumed office 28 April 2012
- Deputy: Mark Hammel
- Preceded by: Ron Clarke

Personal details
- Born: Thomas Richard Tate; 15 January 1959 (age 67) Vientiane, Kingdom of Laos
- Party: Liberal National (2008−present); Liberal (1999−2008)
- Spouse: Ruth Tate
- Education: University of New South Wales
- Website: official website

Thomas Richard Tate (born 15 January 1959) is an Australian politician and businessman who has served as the 13th Mayor of the Gold Coast since April 2012. Standing as an independent candidate he was first elected as mayor in 2012, and following his re-election in 2024 he is now the longest-serving holder of that office.

His vote in subsequent mayoral elections has increased since 2012, with the 2024 election delivering him 66% of the 2CP vote. Under the mayoralty of Tate, the Gold Coast City Council, the city's governing authority, has been investigated for corruption, however Tate was cleared from the investigation. He was also the subject of an ABC investigation, after which he banned ABC journalists from his press conferences.

== Early life ==
Tom Tate was born in 1959 in Vientiane, Laos, to a Thai mother and an Australian father. His father was an engineer who met Tate's mother, when building an airport for the Americans in Thailand. When Tate was 11 months old, his mother took him to Thailand and falsely claimed it was a home birth in order to gain Thai-born citizenship. His parents separated when his father moved back to Sydney from Thailand in 1970, and Tate joined him a year later.

Tate attended school at Scots College in Sydney where he distinguished himself as a drummer in the school's pipe band. He later pursued higher education and became a qualified civil engineer, graduating from the University of New South Wales in the early 1980s.

== Business career ==
Initially, he embarked on a career in the construction industry. However, he later transitioned into the tourism and hospitality sector upon moving to the Gold Coast, where he managed his family's Queensland properties, including the Park Regis in Southport.

Tate worked in the United Kingdom and Australia before joining his father's development company in 1996. Tate's father bought the Islander Resort Hotel in Surfers Paradise which Tate would go on to manage. During the Asian economic downturn in the late 1990s, he offered hotel rooms for $2 per night, leading to the 1999 "off-peak price war". In 2015 he sold the Islander Hotel Resort for $26.5 million.

== Political career ==
Tate had two previous attempts at the mayoralty before his successful attempt, including as an endorsed Liberal candidate in 2008.

Tate was elected Mayor of the Gold Coast in 2012 as an independent without party endorsement, after the previous incumbent, Ron Clarke, resigned in February 2012 to contest the seat of Broadwater in the 2012 Queensland state election.

Since his initial election in 2012, Tom Tate's support has steadily grown, with his increasing first preference votes in subsequent elections. He has achieved more than two-thirds of the preference distribution in each election. This trend continued in the 2024 election, securing him a fourth term as Mayor. His victory in 2024 made him the longest-serving mayor of the Gold Coast.

He has stated that he does not accept political donations and self-funds his campaigns.

Tate joined the Liberal Party in June 1999, and later its successor − the Liberal National Party − when it was formed in 2008. He is also a life member of the Liberal National Party.

== Reviews of conduct ==
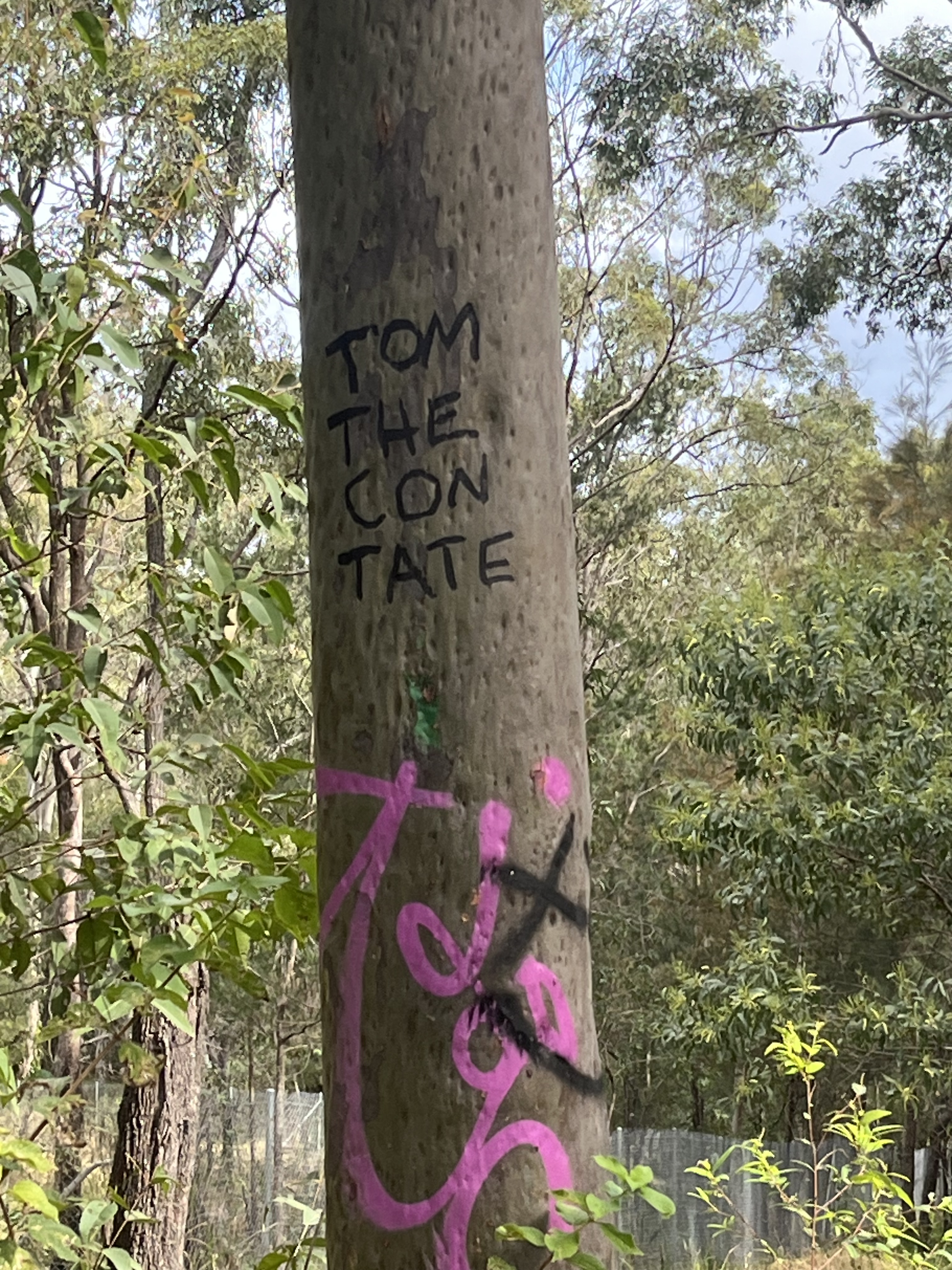
Graffiti campaigning against Tate

=== ABC investigation ===
In September 2017, Tate was the main focus of an ABC Four Corners investigation and resultant program titled All That Glitters. Following the broadcast, Tate banned ABC journalists from his press conferences. Queensland Premier Annastacia Palaszczuk acknowledged the program raised concerns about the council's integrity. In December 2017, Tate filed a defamation lawsuit against the ABC and Councillor Peter Young. In July 2019, he was ordered to pay 90% of the ABC's legal costs for attempting to amend his claim midway through the proceedings. Tate withdrew his lawsuit against Young in December 2019. In July 2021, a Deed of Settlement was reached between Tate and the ABC, resulting in no adverse findings against the broadcaster. The ABC did not issue an apology or pay damages but covered mediation costs. An Editor's Note clarified that the Four Corners report did not accuse Tate of corruption, and he denied any corrupt conduct.

=== CCC Operation Yabber ===
On 2 March 2018, Queensland's Crime and Corruption Commission (CCC) announced it would investigate Tate as part of Operation Yabber, a broader inquiry into the City of Gold Coast's decision-making processes. In May 2018, the investigation was expanded following additional allegations of official misconduct.

By April 2019, Tate was cleared of corruption concerns related to council decision-making, asset sales, and the Waterglow development. In January 2020, the CCC released an 84-page report detailing multiple policy breaches by Tate, misuse of taxpayer money, and inappropriate direction of the council's CEO. The report, described as a "scathing rebuke", highlighted that Tate's Chief of Staff, Wayne Moran, friends, and associates were beneficiaries through his position. The CCC found no grounds for criminal proceedings against Tate or any council members but referred several matters to the Office of Independent Assessor (OIA). Since the OIA's establishment in December 2018, over 70 complaints have been lodged against Tate, with no findings of misconduct. Tate consistently maintained his innocence, alleging that the CCC overstepped its mandate in investigating him and the City of Gold Coast council. He publicly criticised the CCC and its chairperson, Alan MacSporran QC, calling for MacSporran's resignation. After pressure from various quarters, including Tate, a Parliamentary Inquiry into the CCC's investigation of former Logan City Councillors was launched. The report, released on 2 December 2021, contained significant criticisms of the CCC's actions, leading to MacSporran's resignation in January 2022.

=== Social media misconduct ===
In December 2018, Tate was found guilty of official misconduct by the Local Government Remuneration and Discipline Tribunal. He was ordered to undergo counselling and pay a $1250 fine for making "untrue and unreasonable comments" on social media, criticising fellow Councillor Glenn Tozer. The comments were related to funding Tozer's MBA through a local university, which Tate deemed inappropriate use of ratepayer funds. Tate admitted guilty in protecting ratepayer funds. Subsequently, another allegation of inappropriate conduct was made against him, but there was insufficient evidence for a finding.

== Personal life ==
Tate has been married to his wife, Ruth, since 1980, and they have four children all residing on the Gold Coast.

He is bilingual and speaks two languages fluently – English and Thai

Political offices
Preceded by Ron Clarke	Mayor of the Gold Coast; 2012–present	Incumbent
