= Bob La Castra =

Australian television presenter, actor and politician

Robert La Castra (born in England) is an Australian local politician who was a popular children's television show presenter in the 1980s.

La Castra was born in Romford. He was raised by a foster mother from eight months. La Castra attended Woodlands High School, and later completed a five-year shipwright's apprenticeship at Chatham Dockyard. La Castra toured working men's clubs around Gillingham and Strood with his one-man cabaret show. When he was 21, he and his then girlfriend moved to Australia, where La Castra performed as a singer and stand-up comedian until he received a permanent working permit.

La Castra is known for hosting the children's show Wombat, and the game show Big Square Eye. He went on to write for ABC Television's Bananas in Pyjamas with his production company Little Production House.

He also played Eddie Buckingham in the Network Ten soap opera Neighbours in 1990. After leaving Neighbours, La Castra became a presenter on lifestyle show Holiday, which focused on the Australian holiday and travel industries.

La Castra is a City of Gold Coast councillor, first elected in 1997.
