= Mayor of the Gold Coast =

Municipal office in Queensland, Australia

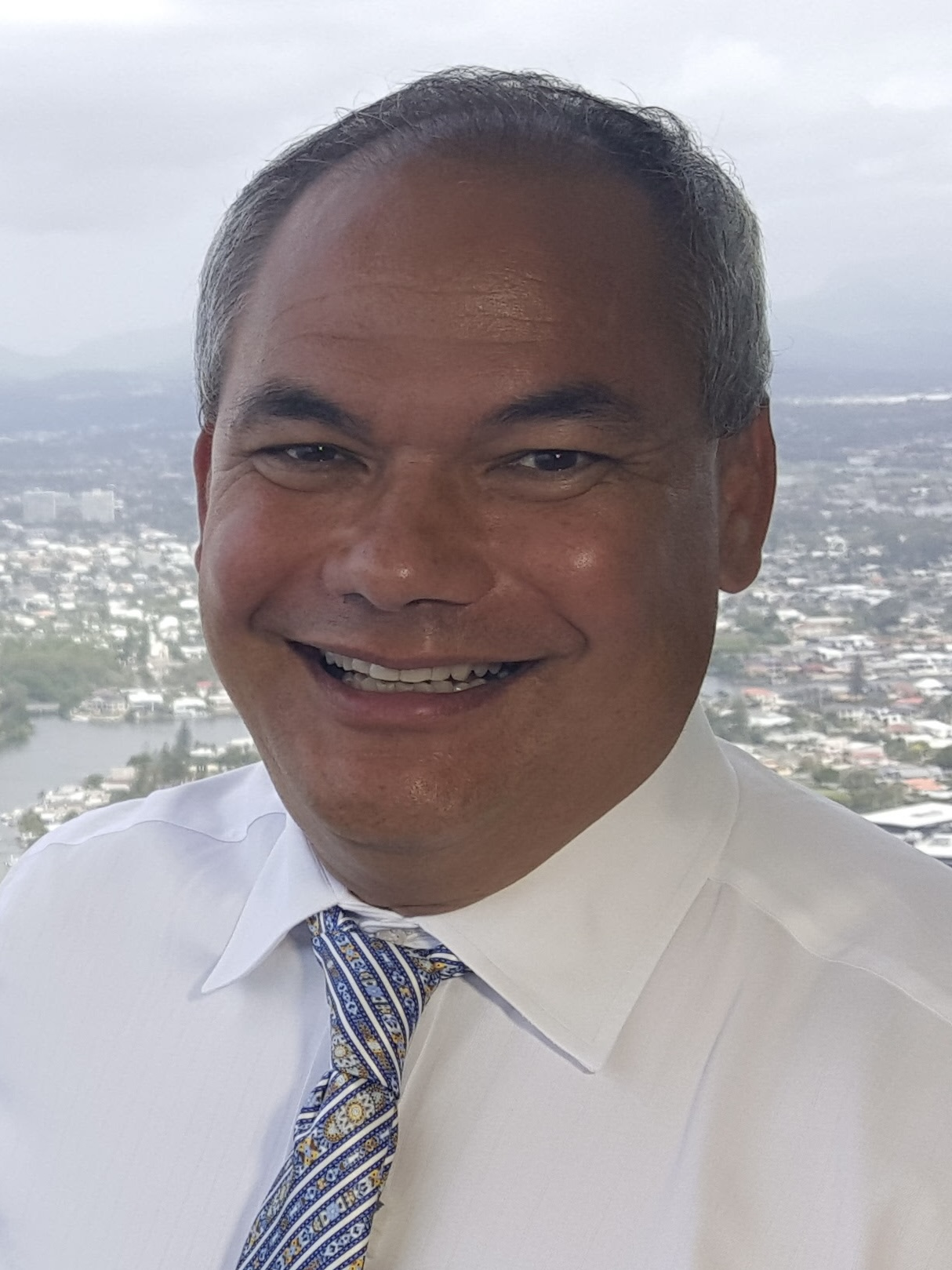
- Incumbent; Tom Tate since 28 April 2012
- Style: Councillor (Informal); His Worship (Formal)
- Term length: 4 years
- Deputy: Cr Mark Hammel
- Website: Gold Coast Mayor

The Mayor of the City of the Gold Coast is presiding officer and public face of the Gold Coast City Council, the local government body of the Gold Coast, Queensland. The current mayor is Tom Tate.

The mayor is charged with representing the city council and is popularly elected by residents of the City of Gold Coast local government area in local elections held every 4 years. The mayor presides over all council meetings; is the only councillor to not represent a specific Gold Coast electoral district; and is the foremost representative of the Gold Coast City Council and its policies.

The Gold Coast City Council reportedly maintains a budget of an estimated $1.83 billion annually, among the highest of municipal governments in Australia. The mayor's office is located in the Southport Town Hall building in Southport, Queensland.

== Mayoral responsibilities ==
Under the Local Government Act 2009 (Qld), Chapter 2, Part 1, the mayor of any city in Queensland, including the Gold Coast and except for Brisbane, has the following responsibilities in addition to their duty as a councillor:

- Leading and managing meetings of the local government at which the mayor is the chairperson, including managing the conduct of the participants at the meetings.
- Preparing and proposing the adoption of the local government's budget.
- Liaising with the chief executive officer on behalf of the other councillors.
- Leading, managing, and providing strategic direction to, the chief executive officer in order to achieve the high quality administration of the local government.
- Directing the chief executive officer, in accordance with the local government's policies.
- Conducting a performance appraisal of the chief executive officer, at least annually, in the way that is decided by the local government (including as a member of a committee, for example).
- Ensuring that the local government promptly provides the Minister with the information about the local government area, or the local government, that is requested by the Minister for Local Government.
- Being a member of each standing committee of the local government.
- Representing the local government at ceremonial or civic functions.

=== Delegation of mayoral responsibilities ===
The Act further stipulates that "a councillor who is not the mayor may perform the mayor's extra responsibilities only if the mayor delegates the responsibility to the councillor," while also stating that "when performing a responsibility, a councillor must serve the overall public interest of the whole local government area."

== List of Gold Coast Mayors ==
The current Gold Coast mayor is Tom Tate. He was first elected on 28 April 2012 and re-elected on both 19 March 2016 and 28 March 2020 with more than two thirds of the preferential vote.

South Coast Mayor	Term
Len Peak	1949–1958
Gold Coast Mayor	Term
Ern Harley	1958–1967
Bruce Small	1967–1973
Robert Neumann	1973–1976
Bruce Small	1976–1978
John Andrews	1978–1979
Keith Hunt	1979–1982
Denis O'Connell	1982–1985
Denis Pie	1985–1988
Lex Bell	1988–1994
Ray Stevens	1995–1997
Gary Baildon	1997–2004
Ron Clarke	2004–2012
Tom Tate	2012–present

== Former town/shire leaders ==
Prior to the South Coast council forming in 1948, ten local government areas existed between the City of Brisbane and the New South Wales border. Just four of those local government areas exist within modern day Gold Coast. Below is a list of the leaders of those areas:

=== Town of Coolangatta ===
Mayor	Term
John Lanham	1914–1915
John Gardiner	1916
George L. Gordon	1917
Ralph G. Johnston	1918–1921
John Gardiner	1921–1924
John Thomas Matters	1924–1927
R. C. Graham	1927–1933
S. W. (Bill) Winders	1933–1946
Len Peak	1946–1948

=== Shire of Coomera ===
Chairman	Term
David Yaun	1880–1884
William Bailey	1884–1886
A. Robinson	1886–1887
Samuel Grimes	1887–1900
Richard Mayes	1900–1904
J. Yaun	1904–1905
John Beattie	1905–1906
A. Thomson	1906–1907
I. Hart	1907–1908
J. Yaun	1908–1909
T. Doherty	1909–1910
John Joseph Johns	1910–1911
James Frank Oxenford	1911–1913
John Siganto	1914–1915
James Frank Oxenford	1915–1916
Richard Mayes	1916–1918
John Beattie	1918–1919
James Frank Oxenford	1919–1922
S. F. Walker	1922–1923
T. Doherty	1923
A. Thomson	1923–1924
John Joseph Johns	1924–1927
John Siganto	1927–1930
Charles Edwards	1930–1937
S. R. Black	1937–1946
William Frank Oxenford	1946–1948

=== Shire of Nerang ===
Chairman	Term
Walter John Browne	1880–
Unknown	1881–1911
Walter James Brake	1911–1928
Unknown	1928–1948

=== Town/Shire of Southport ===
Chairman	Term
Robert F. Johnston	1883–1884
William Charles Welsh	1884–1890
C. A. Beetham	1890–1892
George Andrews	1892–1893
Thomas M. Kirk	1893–1896
W. Downs	1897–1898
Edward Hicks	1898–1899
Edward Proud	1899–1990
Robert F. Johnston	1900–1902
Edward Hicks	1903–1904
Edward Fass	1904
C. A. Beetham	1904–1907
J. W. Proud	1907–1908
H. Soegaard	1908–1909
George Andrews	1909–1910
John Siganto	1910–1911
Edward Hicks	1911–1912
George Andrews	1912–1913
Ernest Freeman	1913–1917
Edward Fass	1917–1918
Edward Hicks	1918–1921
Edward Fass	1921–1924
Washington Waters	1924–1927
Joseph Hendry Grice	1927–1930
C. H. Steadman	1930–1933
Henry Wilson	1933–1936
Joseph Wood Proud	1936–1948

On 9 December 1948, as part of a major reorganisation of local government in South East Queensland, an Order in Council created the Shire of Albert by amalgamating Shire of Beenleigh, Shire of Coomera, Shire of Nerang, the southern part of Shire of Tingalpa and the eastern part of Shire of Waterford. On 8 June 1978, the Shire of Logan was created which reduced the Shire of Albert to nearly a quarter of its previous population. The Shire of Albert was amalgamated with the Gold Coast City Council in 1995. With the exception of the Beenleigh–Eagleby region, which was transferred to Logan City in 2008, the area of the Albert Shire is still present in modern-day City of Gold Coast.

=== Shire of Albert ===
Chairman	Term
Eric Gaven	1949–1950
Frank Oxenford	1950–1952
Alex Clark	1952–1958
Russ Hinze	1958–1967
Hugh Dunstan Muntz	1967–1982
Bill Laver	1982–1994
Ray Stevens	1994–1995

== Election results ==
=== 2024 ===
2024 Queensland mayoral elections: Gold Coast
Party	Candidate	Votes	%	±%
Independent LNP	Tom Tate	170,150	51.82	−3.91
Independent	Eddy Sarroff	68,061	20.73	+20.73
Independent	Danielle Dunsmore	25,983	7.91	+7.91
Animal Justice	Jennifer Horsburgh	18,130	5.52	+5.52
Independent	Rosie Foster	14,642	4.46	+4.46
Independent	Lavinia Rampino	9,137	2.78	+2.78
Independent LNP	Virginia Freebody	7,800	2.38	−3.23
Independent	Brett Lambert	7,581	2.31	−3.97
Independent	Gary Pead	6,846	2.09	−0.43
Total formal votes		328,330	95.45	+0.86
Informal votes		15,641	4.55	−0.86
Turnout		343,971	79.94	+5.82
Two-candidate-preferred result
Independent LNP	Tom Tate	177,666	66.32	−0.61
Independent	Eddy Sarroff	90,218	33.68	+33.68
Independent LNP hold				

=== 2020 ===
2020 Queensland mayoral elections: Gold Coast
Party	Candidate	Votes	%	±%
Independent	Tom Tate	151,579	55.73	−8.13
Independent	Mona Hecke	67,117	24.68	+24.68
Independent	Brett Lambert	17,083	6.28	+3.22
Independent	Virginia Freebody	15,260	5.61	+5.61
Independent	Kris Bourban	9,115	3.35	+3.35
Independent	Gary Pead	6,843	2.52	+2.52
Civil Liberties & Motorists	Suphakan Somsriruen	2,545	0.94	+0.94
Independent	Derek Rosborough	2,429	0.89	+0.89
Turnout		287,531	74.12	
Two-candidate-preferred result
Independent	Tom Tate	154,054	66.93	−6.21
Independent	Mona Hecke	76,126	33.07	+33.07
Independent hold		Swing	−6.21	

=== 2016 ===
2016 Queensland mayoral elections: Gold Coast
Party	Candidate	Votes	%	±%
Independent LNP	Tom Tate	172,735	63.86	
Independent	Penny Toland	53,081	19.62	
Independent	Jim Wilson	25,181	9.31	
Independent	Brett Lambert	8,151	3.01	
Independent	Andrew Middleton	5,978	2.21	
Independent	John Abbott	5,369	1.98	
Total formal votes		270,495	94.73	
Informal votes		15,050	5.27	
Turnout		285,545		
Two-candidate-preferred result
Independent LNP	Tom Tate	176,538	73.14	
Independent	Penny Toland	64,826	26.86	
Independent LNP hold		Swing		

=== 2012 ===
2012 Queensland mayoral elections: Gold Coast
Party	Candidate	Votes	%	±%
Independent LNP	Tom Tate	83,876	37.05	
Independent	Eddy Sarroff	40,958	18.09	
Independent	Susie Douglas	35,417	15.65	
Independent	Peter Young	26,977	11.92	
Independent	Dean Vegas	20,868	9.22	
Independent	Keith Douglas	14,702	6.49	
Independent	John Abbott	3,568	1.58	
Total formal votes		226,366	95.48	
Informal votes		10,724	4.52	
Turnout		237,090		
Two-candidate-preferred result
Independent LNP	Tom Tate	90,935	64.34	
Independent	Eddy Sarroff	50,399	35.66	
Independent LNP gain from Independent		Swing		

=== 2008 ===
2008 Queensland mayoral elections: Gold Coast
Party	Candidate	Votes	%	±%
Independent	Ron Clarke	79,463	35.62	
Liberal	Tom Tate	59,585	26.71	+26.71
Unite GC	Rob Molhoek	57,605	25.82	+25.82
Independent	John Bradford	20,754	9.30	
Independent	Ray Schearer	5,704	2.56	
Total formal votes		223,111	95.71	
Informal votes		10,005	4.29	
Turnout		233,116		
Two-candidate-preferred result
Independent	Ron Clarke	90,418	53.99	
Liberal	Tom Tate	77,039	46.01	+46.01
Independent hold		Swing		

== Governance of Gold Coast City ==
The city is governed at the local level by the Gold Coast City Council, whose jurisdiction spans the Gold Coast, Queensland, and surrounding areas. Based on resident population, it is the second largest local government area in Australia and its council maintains a staff of over 2,500. It was established in 1948, but has existed in its present form since 1995.

=== Wards and councillors ===
Gold Coast City has been divided into 14 wards (known as divisions), each electing one councillor at elections held every four years. The most recent local government election was on 19 March 2016.

Divisional Councillors are:

- Division 1: Cr Donna Gates Dep Mayor – Yatala
- Division 2: Cr William Owen-Jones – Coomera
- Division 3: Cr Cameron Caldwell – Paradise Point
- Division 4: Cr Kristyn Boulton – Biggera Waters
- Division 5: Cr Peter Young – Pacific Pines, Nerang and Hinterland areas
- Division 6: Cr Dawn Crichlow – Southport
- Division 7: Cr Gary Baildon – Surfers Paradise
- Division 8: Cr Robert La Castra – Ashmore
- Division 9: Cr Glen Tozer – Mudgeeraba
- Division 10: Cr Paul Taylor – Broadbeach
- Division 11: Cr Hermann Vorster – Robina
- Division 12: Cr Pauline Young – Burleigh Heads
- Division 13: Cr Daphne McDonald – Palm Beach
- Division 14: Cr Gail O'Neill – Coolangatta

== See also ==
- Gold Coast, Queensland
- List of mayors of Gold Coast
- Local Government Areas of Queensland
