= Southport State High School Buildings =

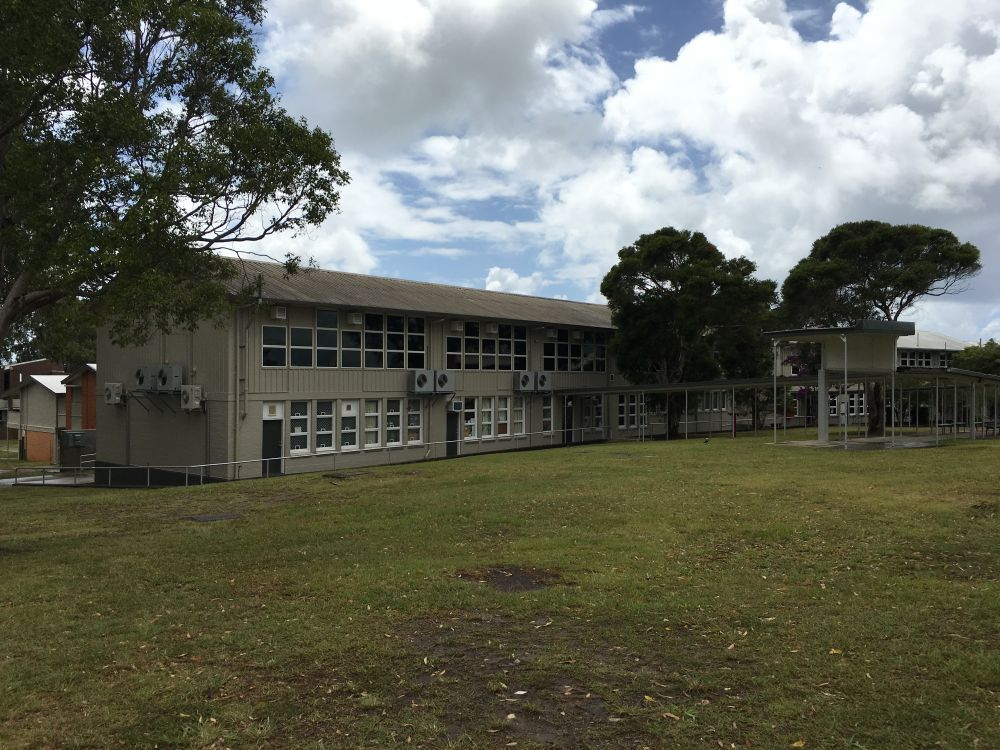
- Hawksley Prefabricated School Building, Block B, and covered ways, from south-west, 2016

- Location within Queensland
- 27.9619°S 153.4034°E
- Location: 75 Smith Street, Southport, Gold Coast City, Queensland, Australia

Queensland Heritage Register
- Official name: Southport State High School
- Type: state heritage
- Designated: 14 October 2016
- Reference no.: 650034

Southport State High School Buildings is a ground of heritage-listed state high school buildings at Southport State High School at 75 Smith Street, Southport, Gold Coast City, Queensland, Australia. It is also known as Southport State High School. It was added to the Queensland Heritage Register on 14 October 2016.

== History ==
Southport State High School (SHS) opened at its current 13.44ha (33.2ac) site on Smith Street, Gold Coast in 1955, separating from the Southport State School, which had included a secondary department (or 'high top') from 1916. Southport SHS demonstrates the growth in provision of secondary education across Queensland in the 1950s on new sites with increased facilities. The school retains one rare Hawksley prefabricated school building (Block E 1957–1958), covered walkways (1954–1961) that linked the 1950s buildings; retaining walls and railings; and assembly and sports areas; set within a generous landscaped site that exhibits organic site planning. The school has been in continuous operation since its establishment.

The township of Southport evolved after its survey as a marine resort on the Crown Reserve at Nerang Creek Heads in 1874. Its first allotments were sold in April 1875 and the first of its many boarding houses opened in the following year. The sale of 180 marine villa sites on 13 March 1878 further stimulated Southport's growth as a popular resort for Darling Downs pastoralists and the elite of Brisbane and Ipswich. From 1879 visitors could reach Southport via a daily Cobb & Co coach from Brisbane and Ipswich, or via the steamer Iris from Brisbane to Southport twice weekly, or by the steamers Albert or Leonie. By the 1880s Southport had a permanent population of about 230, sufficient to justify the establishment of a primary school, which opened on 17 February 1880.

From 1860 the Queensland Government played an important role in the provision of schools in Queensland, providing an alternative to church schools and private schools. The provision of schools was linked to the location and development of communities, the number of children within reach of particular locations, community expectations, and changing government policies regarding the best way to provide for the education of Queensland children.

Southport continued to develop as a beachside holiday resort throughout the 1880s and 1890s, becoming Queensland's principal seaside resort. Its popularity with the colonial elite was boosted when Queensland Governor, Sir Anthony Musgrave (1883–8), established a holiday home there in 1884. Its popularity with all classes of Queenslanders multiplied after the opening of the railway extension to Southport from Beenleigh, in 1889, gave them easier access. By 1901, Southport's permanent population was 1230, which trebled in the peak holiday season.

In Queensland, governments were slow to establish state secondary education, considering this to be of little relevance as Queensland's economy was based on the primary industries. The Grammar Schools Act 1860 provided scholarships for high-achieving students to attend elite grammar schools, although few were awarded. It was not until 1912 that the government instituted a high school system, whereby separate high schools were established in major towns or, where the student population was too small, a primary school was expanded to include a "high top". High tops were an economical measure that provided essentially the same education while utilising already established facilities.

By 1914, Southport's residents believed their town warranted a high school. On 21 April 1914, W Lather, the Secretary of the Southport State School Committee, requested that high school classes be established at Southport State School. In the following year, a deputation called on the Minister for Education and in 1915 a public meeting was held, which elected a committee for promoting the establishment of a high school at Southport. The District Inspector visited the area at the end of 1915 and recommended that a high school be established at the Southport State School. Following an entrance test held on 25 February 1916, 30 pupils were approved for admission to a "High School Top" at Southport State School. High School classes commenced on 10 July 1916 in rented premises, but classes were conducted at the school from the beginning of the following year.

During the interwar period, Southport grew into a large town renowned as a popular resort and a fashionable residential and educational centre. With its population approaching 2000, Southport was proclaimed a separate town from Albert Shire in 1918. By 1921 it had a permanent population of 3550 people, increasing to over 6000 residents in 1925. By the 1930s Southport had "many modern hotels, guest houses, flats ... water supply, septic sewerage systems and electric light".

After World War II, Southport continued to expand as Australia's beach culture developed and tourism to the South Coast boomed. In 1949 the Southport municipality amalgamated with that of Coolangatta municipality and the Burleigh Heads area excised from the Shire of Nerang to form the Town of South Coast, consisting of a coastal strip from Labrador to Coolangatta. As the commercial and administrative centre of the South Coast (renamed the Gold Coast from 1958), Southport experienced steady residential and economic growth in the 1950s, but the coastal area south of the town experienced massive growth. This development inevitably led to a demand for state schools in the region.

The Department of Public Instruction was largely unprepared for the enormous demand for state education that began in the late 1940s and continued well into the 1960s. This was a nation-wide occurrence resulting from immigration and the unprecedented population growth now termed the "baby boom". Queensland schools were overcrowded and, to cope, many new buildings were constructed and existing buildings were extended. The overriding concern for the Department of Public Instruction was the need to build school buildings as expeditiously and economically as possible because the Queensland Government regarded education as a low priority and provided the department with only a small budget.

The need for an adequate high school at Southport, to serve the whole South Coast, became a priority in the 1950s. In September 1953 there were 99 pupils attending the Secondary Department of the Southport State School. Of those, 62 resided outside Southport. As the school did not teach science subjects, students were unable to pursue any university study that required science as a prerequisite.

In response to this situation, the Minister for Public Instruction acted to provide adequate high school education on the South Coast. He approved the establishment of a sub-senior class at the Southport SHS from the beginning of 1955 and allocated £61,831 in the 1954–5 financial year for the erection of the new Southport State High School.

In Queensland, high schools remained few in number until after World War II, when secondary education became accepted as essential and was more widely provided. In the 1950s the number of high schools in Queensland increased significantly. The grounds were large, greater than 12 acres (4.8ha) providing ample room for sports facilities. The general classroom buildings were the same standard types as used for primary schools but high schools also included purpose-built science laboratories, domestic science buildings, workshops for woodwork and metal work, libraries, and gymnasiums. These were also built to standard plans but were specific to their use and not a continuation of previous designs. This reflected educationalists' rejection of the previous designs of school buildings, considering them outdated and their favouring of "lighter, loosely grouped, flexible" buildings.

There was also a focus on the fit between the school and its neighbourhood, as well as site planning for expansion. In the early 1950s, architects developed master planning concepts that influenced the design and layout of the whole school. Initially, these plans were broadly based on regular and symmetrical plan forms around a central or prominent axis. A few years later there was a shift away from grid-like layouts to organic layouts which provided for growth and change. Classroom wings were connected to and fanned away from a central nucleus. Master planning schemes were focussed on the ideal solar orientation of buildings as well as their relationship to the natural contours and existing vegetation, resulting in building layouts that were more asymmetrical and open. The long, narrow buildings were positioned so that the spaces captured between them created playground areas and courtyards.

Plans for a new Southport State High School, drawn by the Department of Public Works (DPW) and approved in October 1954, demonstrate an organic planning approach, with the buildings orientated at various angles and connected by covered ways. Positioned in the elevated southwest corner of the new 9.6ha (23.7ac) site, which was bounded by Smith Street (south), Brooke Avenue (west), Townson Avenue (north, now Lionel Avenue), Loders Creek (northeast) and Worendo Street (west, no longer extant), the buildings were "specially planned to suit the natural contours of the site and also make the most use of the prevailing breezes".

The site was cleared by November 1954 and tenders called for the transport of building materials from the railway to the school site. Construction commenced soon afterwards. The initial teaching buildings comprised three Hawksley prefabricated school buildings imported from Britain. All three (Blocks A, B and C) were erected by the end of July 1955 and teaching commenced there in late August 1955.

Hawksley prefabricated school buildings were prefabricated classrooms imported by the DPW from Hawksley Construction Co. of Gloucester, England, in response to materials shortages and the pressures of the baby boom. Across Australia, £1.5 million worth of Hawksley prefabricated buildings for schools, offices, hospitals and bungalows had been delivered by November 1951. Between 1952 and 1958, a total of 27 Hawksley prefabricated school buildings (90 classrooms) were imported by the DPW; initially intended to provide classroom accommodation at high schools and technical colleges, they were also erected at primary and infants schools across Queensland. Hawksley buildings were erected at Mount Isa State High School, Gladstone State High School, Cavendish Road State High School and Southport State High Schools; Ironside State School, Maryborough Central State School and Ithaca Creek State School; and Junction Park Infants State School, many of which have since been demolished.

The Hawksley system was prefabricated from aluminium structural systems and included aluminium external cladding and aluminium framed awning windows. Aluminium column sections were fixed to a reinforced concrete ring beam at floor level, and support framing was sometimes provided by rolled steel joists at 12-foot (3.7 m) centres and spans. The introduction of structural steel elements reduced the number of concrete piers required and provided more open area under the building. Many of the prefabricated components utilised techniques developed during World War II in aircraft manufacture, including pop-riveting and the use of synthetic gaskets and sealants. As a consequence, this system had an industrial aesthetic, unique in the evolution of Queensland school architecture.

Hawksley buildings could be high or low-set, had a verandah as circulation, and a gable roof. Ideally, they were oriented so the verandah faced north and the classroom faced south. The verandah wall and the opposite classroom wall had extensive areas of aluminium-framed awning windows, providing abundant natural ventilation and lighting. The classrooms were 24 feet (7.3 m) wide, larger than most previous classrooms. A range of building lengths and layout configurations comprising classrooms, storerooms, teachers and other rooms, all accessed via the verandah, were available and identified as alphabetised Hawksley "types". The buildings arrived in panel form, with the internal details prefabricated in the factory and components designed to be readily handled, to enable rapid assembly on site.

Masonry and concrete understoreys, and ancillary elements such as hat and bag racks, railings and stairs, were designed and installed by the DPW. Attempts were made by DPW architects, in the adaptation of these prefabricated buildings, to use "sympathetic materials and ... preserve the inherent lightness of the structure in the finished design".

At Southport SHS, Block A, used for domestic science teaching, was a Hawksley prefabricated school building "type B less 16ft" (4.8 metres (16 ft)). Lowset with a gable roof and a northern verandah, it had a large number of awning windows in its southern and northern walls.

Block B to the north of Block A, a Hawksley prefabricated school building "type H plus additional 40ft", was highset on a face brick substructure, with supporting concrete piers and metal posts, above a concrete plinth. The high school building had a gable roof, and was sheeted externally on the upper level with ribbed aluminium panels. The northern side had a verandah on both levels that had tubular steel balustrades, handrails, and supports, and enclosed hat and store rooms at the ends. The building contained four 24-foot (7.3 m) wide classrooms, a commercial room (west) and principal's office (east) on the upper level; with a science laboratory, store and lecture room (west), and lavatories (east) flanking an enclosed area for students' recreation space (temporary library and reading room) below.

Block C to the east of Block A, a lowset manual training building, was a Hawksley prefabricated school building "type A plus 8ft". This building had a gable roof, a west-facing verandah, and exterior walls and eaves clad with ribbed aluminium panels, awning windows and two louvred vents high in the gable end walls.

Covered ways connecting Blocks A, B and C were also constructed in 1954–5. These had concrete footings, steel round posts with struts at the ceiling, concrete paths, timber seating with steel frames, sheet ceilings and galvanised corrugated metal roof sheets and square profile guttering. The covered ways surrounded an assembly area to the immediate south of Block B.

In December 1955, soon after its commencement, the South Coast Bulletin newspaper commented on the modern new high school and the change of attitude towards secondary education that had preceded its establishment:

Standing in 24 acres of grounds, the school consists of three blocks designed in accordance with modern standards of school architecture. Great changes were made in educational thought and practice... following two World Wars and the intervening depression. With a clear conception of the rights of the individual there came acceptance of the principle that secondary education is the birthright of every intelligent child and that his studies be closely related to his needs and aptitudes.

Further funding, of £9406, was allocated to building at Southport SHS in the 1955–1956 financial year. Another Hawksley prefabricated school building (Block D) of unknown type, shown as a future administration block to the immediate east of Block A in the original school plan, was constructed on the site after December 1955. This was a lowset building with a small entry porch.

The Southport State High School, which provided secondary education for the whole of the South Coast, was officially opened on 26 October 1957, with the unveiling of a plaque in the vestibule of the Administration building, by the Minister for Education, Jack Pizzey. The flagpole proposed for the site in 1954 was on-site, located to the south of Block B, for the official opening day. In conjunction with the opening, student displays and demonstrations, an art exhibition and a fete were held, while the event closed with a passing out parade of the School Cadet Corps.

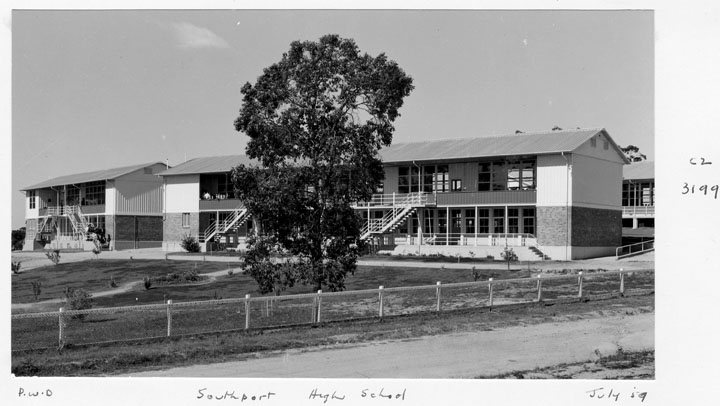
Southport State High School, 1959

Growth of the school population continued and more buildings were added to the site. A fifth Hawksley prefabricated school building (Block E), shown on the original school plan as an intermediate school building situated to the east of Block B, was constructed in 1957–1958. This was a Hawksley "type F amended" building, highset on a face brick lower level with a concrete plinth. Unlike Block B, the upper level incorporated open-web metal trusses that reduced the requirement for supporting elements. It had a gable roof and was sheeted externally on the upper level with ribbed aluminium panels. The northern side had a verandah on both levels that had tubular steel balustrade, handrails and supports, and enclosed hat (western ends) rooms. The upper level contained three classrooms and a physics laboratory (east); with an enclosed student recreation area and toilets (east) below. The classrooms were 24-foot (7.3 m) wide. A pathway with concrete paving and retaining walls was constructed along the southern side of Block E, connecting with those that existed along the southern side of Block B; and a ground floor covered way, connecting Block E with existing covered ways to the south, was built at the same time. Alterations to Block B were also made - with balustrades at the upper verandah ends replaced by bag racks.

Further additions to the school were made in the early 1960s. Plans were drawn for the addition of Block F in 1960. This two-storey building with undercroft was supported by open-web steel trusses. Ribbed zinc anneal roof sheeting and wall cladding was used. The timber-framed building had brick ends that were designed to match the existing school buildings. Western verandahs were used at both levels and awning windows on all elevations. Block F was completed by May 1961. It was aligned roughly north–south and linked to the eastern end of Block E by an elevated covered way with open-web steel trusses, similar in design to a link that was also constructed between the first floor verandahs of Blocks B and E.

With the addition of Block F, a parade ground was formed to the southeast of Block E, providing a formal assembly space for the growing school. Other ground improvements at Southport SHS in the 1960s included tennis courts, at the northern end of the grounds by October 1960; and a school oval with perimeter plantings to the east of the school buildings by June 1964, to the immediate south of land that had been resumed in July 1961. Further resumptions (1974) and closure of Worendo Street (1975) brought the school grounds to a total of 13.44ha (33.2ac). Although more high schools were built on the Gold Coast as its permanent population continued to increase - Miami SHS (1963), Palm Beach-Currumbin SHS (1972), Keebra Park SHS in Southport (1973) and Merrimac SHS (1979) - Southport SHS continued to expand to meet secondary education needs in the region. By 1980, 14 teaching buildings plus an assembly hall and sporting facilities (tennis and basketball courts, sports oval) populated the site, radiating in an organic manner to the northeast and northwest from the original buildings. A principal's residence, onsite by 10 June 1964, stood in the northwest corner of the grounds.

Some changes to the surviving 1950s buildings have been made. Alterations to Block E were made in 1988–9 reconfiguring the upper level layout to three classrooms and converting the then science laboratories to general classrooms, and refurbishing the ground floor drama room (former student recreation area). In 2001 the lower level of Block E was reconfigured for a multi-media room. Changes to Block B in 2001 included creation of computer labs (former commercial room and classroom) on the upper level, new aluminium windows, and the replacement of two doors. In 2012 a concrete switchback ramp for disabled access was added in the NE corner of Block B. The brick walls and concrete plinths of the lower levels of both Blocks B and E have been painted.

By 2000, the school incorporated 16 teaching buildings, an assembly hall and sporting facilities including a swimming pool. The principal's residence was still onsite in the northwest corner of the site on Brooke Avenue.

Removal of buildings from the site took place in this century. By 2009 the principal's residence had been removed and in 2011 Blocks A, C and D were demolished; however, their associated 1950s covered walkways remain.

Of the few reasonably-intact Hawksley prefabricated school buildings identified in the Queensland Schools Heritage Conservation Study, 1996, only the two at Southport SHS and five at Mt Isa SHS (1953) are extant in 2016. Along with another Hawksley "type K plus six bays" at Maryborough Central State School, they are rare known surviving examples of the 27 original Hawksley prefabricated school buildings imported by the DPW, and the only known examples of types F and H in Queensland.

The importance of the school within the community has been acknowledged during anniversary celebrations. In 1991 Southport State High School celebrated its 75th anniversary with the production of a commemorative booklet entitled Southport State High School: celebrating 75 years, 1916–1991. For its 100th anniversary in 2016 the school held a centenary ball with alumni Clive Palmer as a guest speaker.

In 2025 Southport State High School continues to operate from its Smith Street site. Its school population is approximately 2000 students. The campus incorporates 20 buildings, plus sporting facilities. The school is important to the Gold Coast as a focus for the community and generations of students have been taught there.

On 4 October 2019, Block B was destroyed by a suspicious fire.

== Description ==
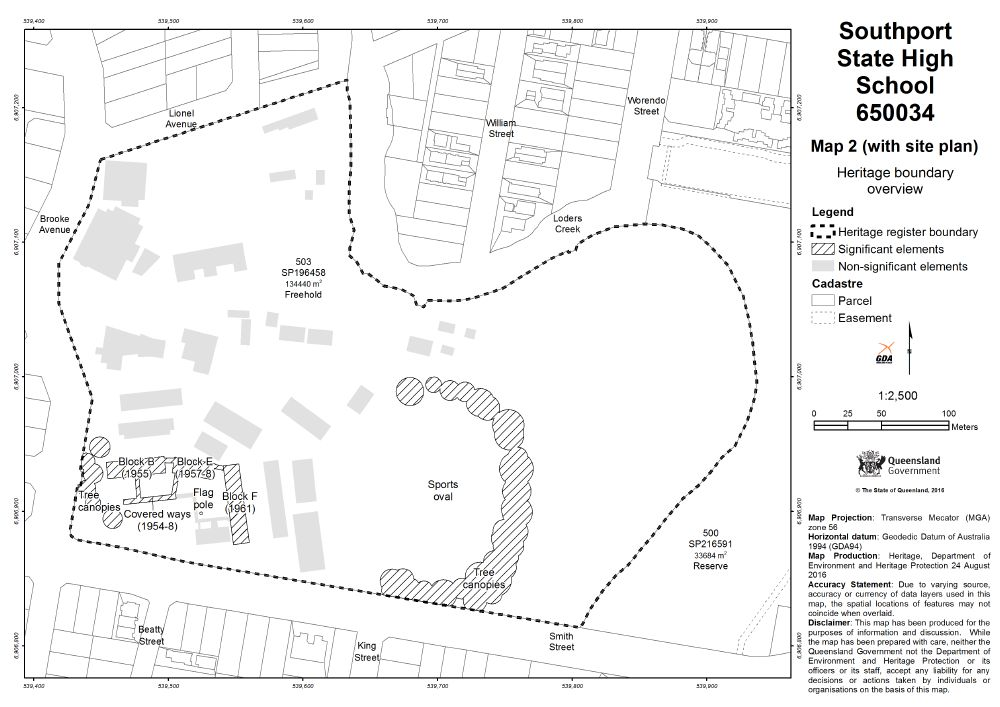
Site map, 2016

Southport State High School occupies a 13.44ha gently sloping site within a predominantly residential area of Southport. The main entrance addresses the major thoroughfare of Smith Street (south), and the school is bounded by Brooke Avenue (west), Lionel Avenue (north), and Loders Creek (north and east). The school retains two two-storey 1950s Hawksley prefabricated school buildings aligned approximately east–west (Block B, 1955, west; and Block E, 1957–8, east), located close to the elevated southwest corner of the site. Block B is orientated at a slight angle and is connected to Block E by a first floor covered walkway (c. 1961). Ground floor covered walkways (1954–58) connect Blocks B and E with an area of vacant land to the immediate south, the former location of three lowset Hawksley buildings (Blocks A, C and D, demolished 2011).

A two-storey building, above an undercroft (Block F, 1961), aligned north–south and connected to the eastern end of Block E by an elevated covered way, contributes to the overall significance of the site planning by enclosing the eastern side of the parade ground.

=== Hawksley prefabricated school buildings ===
Blocks B and E are long, two-storey, gable-roofed buildings, with north-facing verandahs on both levels. The lower levels are brick, set on concrete plinths, and the aluminium-framed upper levels are clad and lined in painted ribbed aluminium sheeting, including the eaves and first-floor verandah ceilings. The upper gable-ends are flat-sheeted and have square louvred vents.

Large areas of aluminium-framed awning windows line the first floor northern and southern walls; the northern with fixed lower sashes and tubular steel rails at sill height along the verandah. Ground floor windows comprise predominantly timber-framed awning windows on the southern side and double-hung sashes, with louvred glass fanlights, on the northern side; former louvres at the eastern ends have been replaced with modern fixed glazing. Windows generally have original hardware. Some windows have modern security screens or have been replaced with air-conditioning units. Doors along the verandahs are predominately flush-finish replacements, with fanlights on the ground floors and those on the first floors part-glazed.

Stairs on cantilevered concrete supports lead from the lower to the upper verandahs, which have tubular steel rail balustrades. The ends of the first floor balustrades have been replaced with bag racks that are clad externally in ribbed metal, and concrete-block bag racks have been added on the ground floor. The ground floor verandahs have paved concrete floors and flat-sheeted ceilings, with cover strips.

==== Block B ====
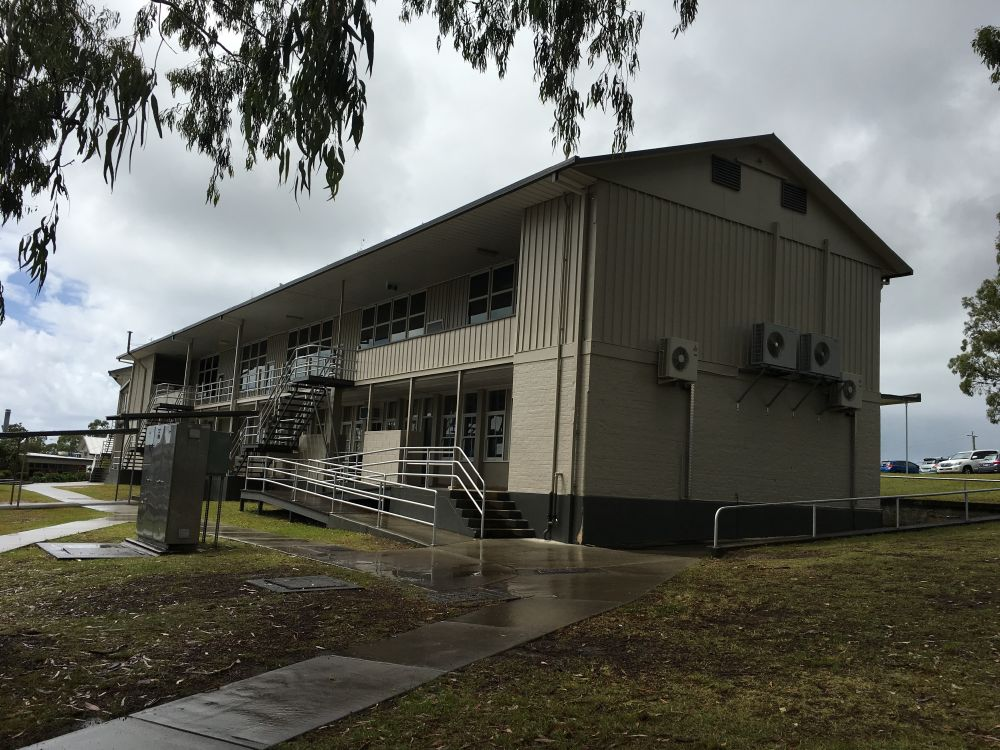
Block B, 2016

Before being damaged beyond repair in a fire on 4 October 2019, Block B was a Hawksley "type H plus additional 40ft", and the upper level was supported by a combination of concrete piers and round metal posts.

The ground floor contained a staff room (former science laboratory) and classrooms (former science lecture room) at the western end; and toilet blocks and a store room (former locker rooms) at the eastern end. A large room in the centre (former student recreation area) had been partitioned to form a special education services area, connected to an adjacent quiet room (former locker room). The interior masonry walls were rendered and the flat-sheeted ceilings had cover strips.

The first floor contained five classrooms and a staff room (former temporary Principal's office), separated by fixed partitions; doors at the southern end connect the three eastern classrooms. The walls and ceilings were lined with flat aluminium sheets, with metal cover strips.

Block B retained some early framed, ledged glass-topped doors, with louvred fanlights, along the ground floor verandah. Wall returns at the eastern verandah ends indicated the locations of former hat rooms.

==== Block E ====
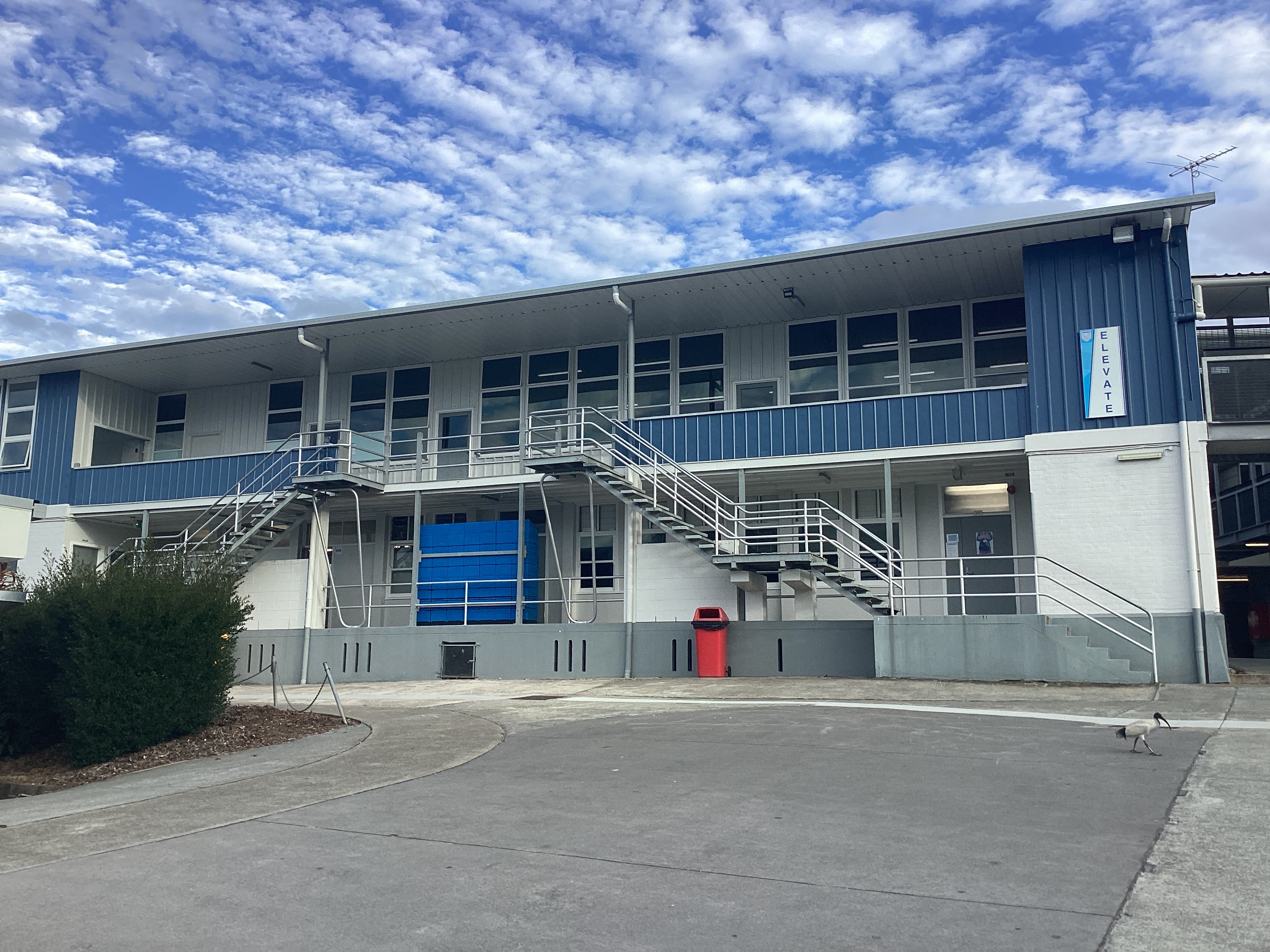
Block E, 2025.

Block E (recently renamed 'Elevate', along with most other buildings in the school), is a Hawksley "type F amended", and the upper level incorporates open-web metal trusses that reduce the requirement for supporting elements.

Some first floor windows at the western end of the southern wall are modern replacements.

The ground floor contains two large classrooms (former student recreation area and locker rooms) and toilets at the eastern end. The interior masonry walls are rendered and the ceilings are flat-sheeted, above the exposed open-web metal trusses. There is an enclosed kitchenette (former hat room) at the western end of the verandah.

The first floor contains two classrooms and a dance studio (formerly four classrooms) separated by fixed partitions. The interior walls and ceilings are lined with flat aluminium sheets, with metal cover strips, including one remaining early partition (western classroom) that retains its angled blackboard mount, with cupboards below.

=== Brick and timber building (Block F) ===
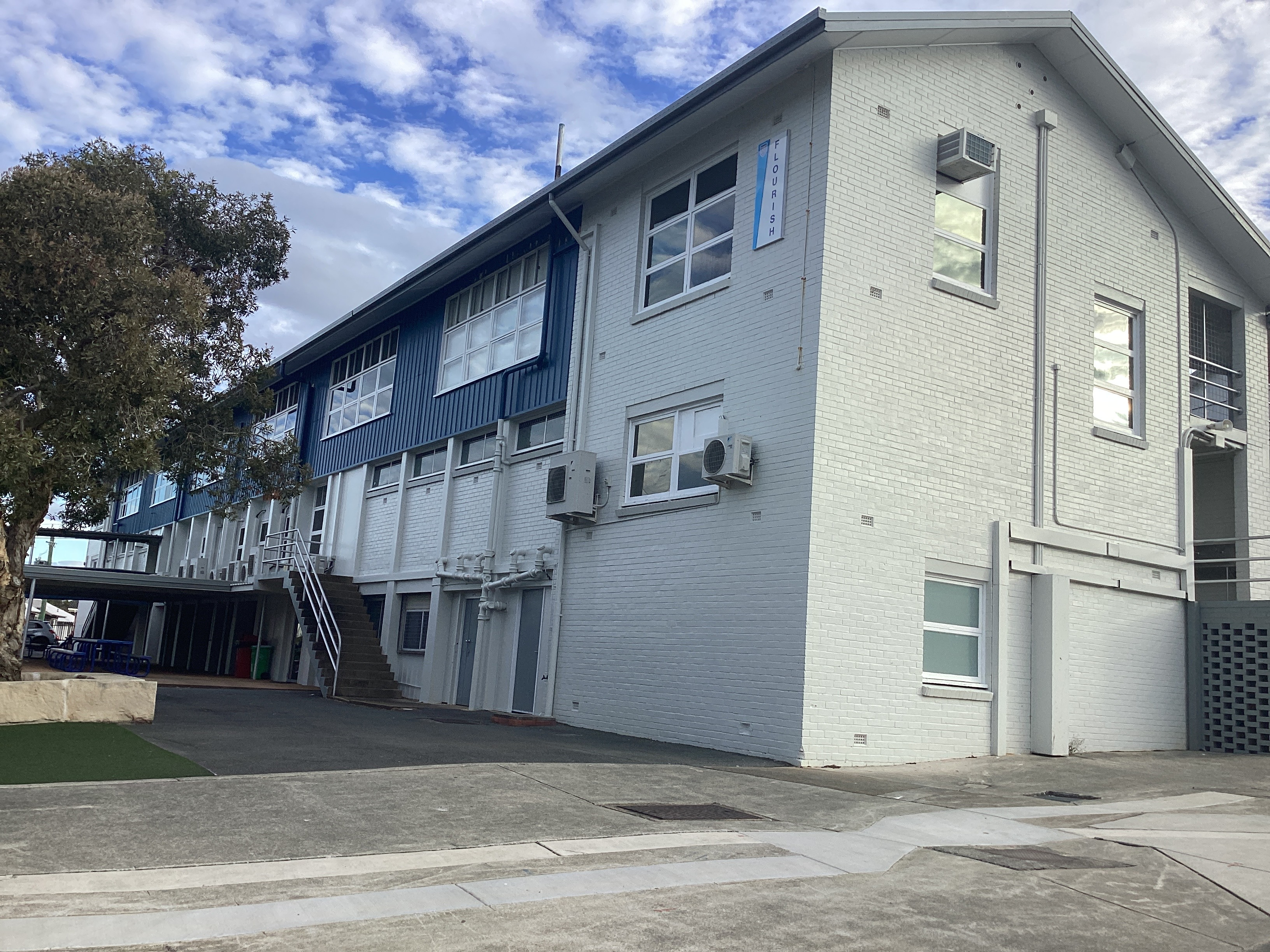
Block F, 2025.

Block F (recently renamed 'Flourish', along with most other buildings in the school), is a long, two-storey brick and timber-framed building, above an undercroft, with the upper level incorporating open-web metal trusses, which are set on rectangular concrete columns and cantilevered to support a west-facing verandah. The northern and southern ends have full-height brick walls enclosing concrete stairwells. The ground floor is face brick (east) and rendered (west); and the first floor is clad in ribbed metal sheeting, with large banks of timber-framed awning windows, with modern sliding fanlights, on the eastern side. The undercroft has rectangular concrete piers and is open to the east.

The first floor verandah has a timber floor, square timber posts and bag racks that form a balustrade; the walls and raked ceiling are flat-sheeted, with cover strips, and the fixed timber-framed verandah windows have modern sliding fanlights. A central section of the first floor verandah has been enclosed with modern metal-framed sliding windows. The ground floor verandah has a concrete slab floor and ribbed aluminium sheet-lined ceiling.

The first floor contains five classrooms and a staff room; the central two classrooms have been extended with the removal of the former verandah wall. The classroom walls and ceilings are flat-sheeted, with rounded cover strips. The ground floor comprises toilets adjacent to the northern and southern stairs, separated from central offices by passageways that connect the ground floor verandah with stairs on the eastern side that access the undercroft. The open undercroft contains a tuckshop.

=== Covered ways ===
Elevated covered ways connecting the first floor verandahs of Blocks B and E, and Blocks E and F, comprise an exposed open-web floor truss system, timber framing and flooring, and tubular steel rail balustrades. The ceilings are flat-sheeted, with cover strips.

The ground floor covered ways have round metal posts with brackets at the flat-sheeted ceilings, corrugated metal-clad flat roofs, and paved concrete paths flanked by pairs of metal-framed timber bench seats. The square-profile guttering is modern.

=== Landscape elements ===
The school grounds are well established, with school buildings at the western end and sporting facilities including tennis and basketball courts to the north and a generously sized sports oval (pre-1964) at the eastern end of the site, with perimeter shade trees including various eucalypt species (spp. Eucalyptus).

The 1950s Hawksley prefabricated school buildings and covered ways are set back and visible from Smith Street, with an open lawn between. Concrete pathways, at the base of concrete retaining walls with tubular steel rails, run along the southern sides of Blocks B and E, and connect with the ground floor covered ways via concrete steps. Several mature eucalypts are situated at the western end of the buildings, near the corner of Smith Street and Brooke Avenue.

A sealed parade ground situated to the south of Block E, and bounded by Block F to the east and a modern administration building to the south, contains a flagpole and several modern memorial plaques.

== Heritage listing ==
Southport State High School Buildings was listed on the Queensland Heritage Register on 14 October 2016 having satisfied the following criteria.

The place is important in demonstrating the evolution or pattern of Queensland's history.

Southport State High School (established in 1955) is important in demonstrating the evolution of state education and its associated architecture in Queensland. The place retains excellent, representative examples of a standard school building that was an architectural response to prevailing government educational philosophies; set in landscaped grounds with sporting facilities.

It is important in demonstrating the pattern of provision of secondary education, on new sites with expanded facilities, across Queensland in the 1950s, a time of enormous growth.

The two Hawksley prefabricated school buildings (1955 & 1957–8) demonstrate the introduction and adoption of imported prefabricated systems by the Queensland Government in response to acute building material shortages and population growth in the post-World War II period.

The layout of these buildings (along with an adjacent brick and timber building with open-web steel floor trusses, 1961), the covered links between them (1954–61) and associated open spaces, reflect the mid-1950s introduction of organic master planning, which responded to the existing contours of the site and provided for ordered growth from a nucleus.

The place demonstrates rare, uncommon or endangered aspects of Queensland's cultural heritage.

Highly intact, the two Hawksley prefabricated school buildings are rare surviving examples of imported post-war aluminium-framed prefabricated school buildings and are the only known examples of Hawksley types F and H in Queensland.

The place is important in demonstrating the principal characteristics of a particular class of cultural places.

Southport State High School is important in demonstrating the principal characteristics of a Queensland state high school of the 1950s. These include its master-planned site incorporating long, narrow buildings, linked around open-ended courtyard spaces; and generous, landscaped grounds with shade trees, assembly and sports areas.

The Hawksley prefabricated school buildings are excellent examples of their type and demonstrate variations of the standard layout configurations and support framing designs: Hawksley "type H plus additional 40ft" (1955), set on concrete piers and metal posts; and Hawksley "type F amended" (1957–8), incorporating open-web metal trusses. Highly intact, they retain their: prefabricated aluminium-framed and clad structures, mounted on brick bases; gabled roofs; verandahs for circulation; 24-foot (7.3 m) wide classrooms; and extensive banks of aluminium-framed awning windows to maximise natural light.

The place has a strong or special association with a particular community or cultural group for social, cultural or spiritual reasons.

Schools have always played an important part in Queensland communities. They typically retain significant and enduring connections with former pupils, parents, and teachers; provide a venue for social interaction and volunteer work; and are a source of pride, symbolising local progress and aspirations.

Southport State High School has a strong and ongoing association with the Southport community. It was established in 1955 and generations of students have been taught there. The place is important for its contribution to the educational development of the Gold Coast and as a focus for the community.

== See also ==
- History of state education in Queensland
- List of schools in Gold Coast, Queensland
