= 1995 Gold Coast City Council election =

- 11 March 1995
- Mayoral election

	First party	Second party
Candidate	Ray Stevens	Gary Baildon
Party	Ind. Liberal	Independent
Mayor before election
Gary Baildon
Independent
Subsequent Mayor
Ray Stevens
Ind. Liberal

The 1995 Gold Coast City Council election was held on 11 March 1995 to elect a mayor and 14 councillors to the City of Gold Coast, a local government area (LGA) of Queensland, Australia.

The election was one of three held in 1995 following several amalgamations, which included the Shire of Albert being absorbed into Gold Coast City.

Ray Stevens, the outgoing mayor of Albert, won the mayoral election, defeating incumbent Gold Coast mayor Gary Baildon as well as five other candidates.

== Background ==
Albert, created in 1948, had seen a rapid expansion from the late 1960s onwards. However, the Shire of Logan was separately incorporated in 1978, and Albert lost 110.0 km^{2} (42.5 sq mi) of its area and 54,650 people in the change − almost three-quarters of its population. With the astronomic growth levels experienced by the Gold Coast area from the late 1970s onwards, the new Albert grew from 18,753 at the 1976 census to 143,697 in 1991.

Although the commission's recommendations only included boundary adjustments between Albert and the City of Gold Coast, the outcome following much public debate was a decision by the Queensland Government to absorb Albert into Gold Coast City.
