= Electoral results for the district of Mermaid Beach =

Queensland, Australia, district election results

This is a list of electoral results for the electoral district of Mermaid Beach in Queensland state elections.

== Members for Mermaid Beach ==
Member	Party	Term
Ray Stevens	Liberal National	2009–present

== Election results ==
=== Elections in the 2020s ===
2024 Queensland state election: Mermaid Beach
Party	Candidate	Votes	%	±%
Liberal National	Ray Stevens	15,762	51.48	+7.41
Labor	Joseph Shiels	8,002	26.14	−4.35
Greens	Lucy Carra Schulz	3,331	10.88	+0.08
One Nation	Roger Marquass	2,097	6.85	+1.84
Family First	Clare Todd	1,423	4.65	+4.65
Total formal votes		30,615	94.53	+0.67
Informal votes		1,771	5.47	−0.67
Turnout		32,386	84.64	−0.42
Two-party-preferred result
Liberal National	Ray Stevens	19,331	63.14	+8.75
Labor	Joseph Shiels	11,284	36.86	−8.75
Liberal National hold		Swing	+8.75	

2020 Queensland state election: Mermaid Beach
Party	Candidate	Votes	%	±%
Liberal National	Ray Stevens	12,604	44.07	−1.48
Labor	Carl Ungerer	8,721	30.49	+5.74
Greens	Zai Harris	3,090	10.80	+1.13
One Nation	Stephen James	1,434	5.01	+5.01
Legalise Cannabis	Deb Lynch	1,142	3.99	+3.99
Independent	Tory Jones	506	1.77	+1.77
United Australia	Hristo Avdjiev	375	1.31	+1.31
Independent	Rhett Holt	302	1.06	+1.06
Independent	Nicholas McArthur-Williams	254	0.89	+0.89
Civil Liberties & Motorists	Suphakan (Mod) Somsriruen	174	0.61	+0.61
Total formal votes		28,602	93.86	+0.50
Informal votes		1,870	6.14	−0.50
Turnout		30,472	85.06	+1.63
Two-party-preferred result
Liberal National	Ray Stevens	15,558	54.39	−1.87
Labor	Carl Ungerer	13,044	45.61	+1.87
Liberal National hold		Swing	−1.87	

=== Elections in the 2010s ===
2017 Queensland state election: Mermaid Beach
Party	Candidate	Votes	%	±%
Liberal National	Ray Stevens	12,232	45.5	−4.4
Labor	Joshua Blundell-Thornton	6,646	24.7	−2.7
Independent	Mona Hecke	3,162	11.8	+11.8
Greens	Helen Wainwright	2,599	9.7	+0.0
Independent	Saraya Beric	1,286	4.8	+4.8
Independent	Ric Allport	541	2.0	+2.0
Independent	Gary Pead	391	1.5	+1.5
Total formal votes		26,857	93.4	−3.8
Informal votes		1,910	6.6	+3.8
Turnout		28,767	83.4	+2.1
Two-party-preferred result
Liberal National	Ray Stevens	15,110	56.3	−4.0
Labor	Joshua Blundell-Thornton	11,747	43.7	+4.0
Liberal National hold		Swing	−4.0	

2015 Queensland state election: Mermaid Beach
Party	Candidate	Votes	%	±%
Liberal National	Ray Stevens	15,287	52.35	−12.78
Labor	Gary Pead	7,333	25.11	+6.64
Greens	Helen Wainwright	2,577	8.83	+1.37
Palmer United	Alex Caraco	2,286	7.83	+7.83
Family First	Simon Green	1,718	5.88	+3.01
Total formal votes		29,201	97.17	−0.51
Informal votes		852	2.84	+0.51
Turnout		30,053	85.62	−2.36
Two-party-preferred result
Liberal National	Ray Stevens	16,374	62.93	−13.12
Labor	Gary Pead	9,647	37.07	+13.12
Liberal National hold		Swing	−13.12	

2012 Queensland state election: Mermaid Beach
Party	Candidate	Votes	%	±%
Liberal National	Ray Stevens	17,856	65.13	+10.69
Labor	Rachel Paterson	5,064	18.47	−15.02
Greens	Jenny Boddy	2,043	7.45	+0.76
Katter's Australian	Ken Law	1,664	6.07	+6.07
Family First	Ben Donovan	788	2.87	+2.87
Total formal votes		27,415	97.67	−0.17
Informal votes		653	2.33	+0.17
Turnout		28,068	87.97	−0.09
Two-party-preferred result
Liberal National	Ray Stevens	18,764	76.05	+15.24
Labor	Rachel Paterson	5,910	23.95	−15.24
Liberal National hold		Swing	+15.24	

=== Elections in the 2000s ===
2009 Queensland state election: Mermaid Beach
Party	Candidate	Votes	%	±%
Liberal National	Ray Stevens	14,628	54.4	+5.9
Labor	Christina Landis	8,999	33.5	−9.3
Greens	Marella Pettinato	1,798	6.7	−2.1
DS4SEQ	Ibolya Monai	744	2.8	+2.8
Independent	Shannon Crane	700	2.6	+2.6
Total formal votes		26,869	97.6	
Informal votes		594	2.4	
Turnout		27,463	88.1	
Two-party-preferred result
Liberal National	Ray Stevens	15,304	60.8	+8.1
Labor	Christina Landis	9,863	39.2	−8.1
Liberal National hold		Swing	+8.1	
