= Southport Division =

Southport Division may refer to:

- Southport (UK Parliament constituency)
- Southport Division, Queensland, a former local government area in Australia
