= Gary Baildon =

Australian former politician (born 1939)

- Baildon c. 2014

Mayor of the Gold Coast
- In office March 1997 – 27 March 2004
- Preceded by: Ray Stevens
- Succeeded by: Ron Clarke
- In office 26 March 1994 – 11 March 1995
- Preceded by: Lex Bell
- Succeeded by: Ray Stevens

Councillor of the City of Gold Coast for Division 7
- In office 19 March 2016 – 28 March 2020
- Preceded by: Lex Bell
- Succeeded by: Ryan Bayldon-Lumsden

Personal details
- Born: Gary J. Baildon; 1939 Nambour, Queensland, Australia
- Party: Independent

Gary J. Baildon (born 1939) is an Australian former politician who served as mayor of the Gold Coast from 1994 until 1995, and again from 1997 until 2004.

== Early life ==
Baildon was born in Nambour on the Sunshine Coast and moved to the Gold Coast in the 1960s.

== Political career ==
Baildon was first elected to Gold Coast City Council in 1988, and was elected mayor in 1994. Following the merger of Albert Shire and Gold Coast City in 1995, Baildon was defeated by Ray Stevens. However, he re-contested the mayoralty in 1997, and this time defeated Stevens.

At the 2004 election, Baildon was defeated by Ron Clarke. He briefly returned to politics, successfully contesting Division 7 in 2016, before retiring after one term.

== Personal life ==
Baildon's son, Andrew Baildon, is a former freestyle and butterfly swimming champion, who represented Australia in the 1988 Summer Olympics in Seoul and the 1992 Summer Olympics in Barcelona.
