= Electoral results for the district of Robina =

Queensland, Australia, district election results

This is a list of electoral results for the electoral district of Robina in Queensland state elections.

== Members for Robina ==
Member	Party	Term
Bob Quinn	Liberal	2001–2006
Ray Stevens	Liberal	2006–2008
Ray Stevens	Liberal National	2008–2009

== Election results ==
=== Elections in the 2000s ===
2006 Queensland state election: Robina
Party	Candidate	Votes	%	±%
Liberal	Ray Stevens	13,082	48.30	−6.65
Labor	Liz Pommer	11,657	43.04	+5.76
Greens	Lara Pape	2,346	8.66	+0.88
Total formal votes		27,085	97.40	−0.29
Informal votes		724	2.60	+0.29
Turnout		27,809	87.19	−1.28
Two-party-preferred result
Liberal	Ray Stevens	13,582	52.53	−6.25
Labor	Liz Pommer	12,275	47.47	+6.25
Liberal hold		Swing	−6.25	

2004 Queensland state election: Robina
Party	Candidate	Votes	%	±%
Liberal	Bob Quinn	14,275	54.95	+0.92
Labor	Bruce Simmonds	9,684	37.28	−8.69
Greens	Kelly Houston	2,020	7.78	+7.78
Total formal votes		25,979	97.69	+2.39
Informal votes		615	2.31	−2.39
Turnout		26,594	88.47	−1.58
Two-party-preferred result
Liberal	Bob Quinn	14,611	58.78	+4.75
Labor	Bruce Simmonds	10,247	41.22	−4.75
Liberal hold		Swing	+4.75	

2001 Queensland state election: Robina
Party	Candidate	Votes	%	±%
Liberal	Bob Quinn	12,822	54.0	+9.2
Labor	Bruce Simmonds	10,909	46.0	+18.9
Total formal votes		23,731	95.3	
Informal votes		1,171	4.7	
Turnout		24,902	90.1	
Liberal hold		Swing	−12.2	
