= Shire of Tamborine =

Local government area of Queensland, Australia

Coordinates: 27.876°S 153.13°E

The Shire of Tamborine was a local government area in South East Queensland, Australia, centred on the village of Tamborine. It existed from 1890 to 1949.

== History ==
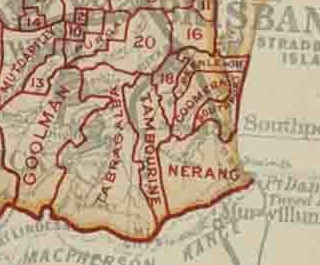
Map of Tambourine Division and adjacent local government areas, March 1902. Legend: Waterford Division (18), Yeerongpilly Division (20)

On 11 November 1879, the Tabragalba Division was created as one of 74 divisions within Queensland under the Divisional Boards Act 1879. On 4 October 1890, part of Tabragalba Division was separated to establish the Tambourine Division.

With the passage of the Local Authorities Act 1902, the Tambourine Division became the Shire of Tambourine on 31 March 1903.

The Shire of Tambourine altered the spelling of its name to Shire of Tamborine on 14 January 1939.

=== Amalgamations in 1948 ===
On 9 December 1948, as part of a major reorganisation of local government in South East Queensland, an Order in Council replacing ten former local government areas between the City of Brisbane and the New South Wales border with only four. The former ten were:

- Beaudesert
- Beenleigh
- Cleveland
- Coolangatta
- Coomera
- Nerang
- Southport
- Tamborine
- Tingalpa
- Waterford

The four resulting local government areas were:

- an enlarged Shire of Beaudesert, an amalgamation of Beaudesert and Tamborine with the western part of Waterford
- the new Shire of Albert, a merger of Beenleigh, Coomera, Nerang (except for the Burleigh Heads area), the southern part of Tingalpa and the eastern part of Waterford
- Town of South Coast, an amalgamation of the Towns of Southport and Coolangatta with the Burleigh Heads part of Nerang (which later became City of Gold Coast)
- the new Redland Shire, an amalgamation of Cleveland and the northern part of Tingalpa (which later became Redland City)

The Order came into effect on 10 June 1949, when the first elections were held.

== Chairmen ==
- 1927: Edwin James Franklin
- Thomas Strachan (several years)
