= Shire of Beenleigh =

Former local government area in Queensland, Australia

Coordinates: 27.7154°S 153.2012°E

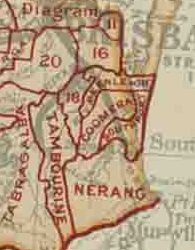
Map of Beenleigh Division and adjacent local government areas, March 1902. Legend: Cleveland Division (11), Tingalpa Division (16), Waterford Division (18), Yeerongpilly Division (20)

The Shire of Beenleigh is a former local government area in the south-east of Queensland, Australia, centred on the town of Beenleigh. It existed from 1879 to 1949.

== History ==
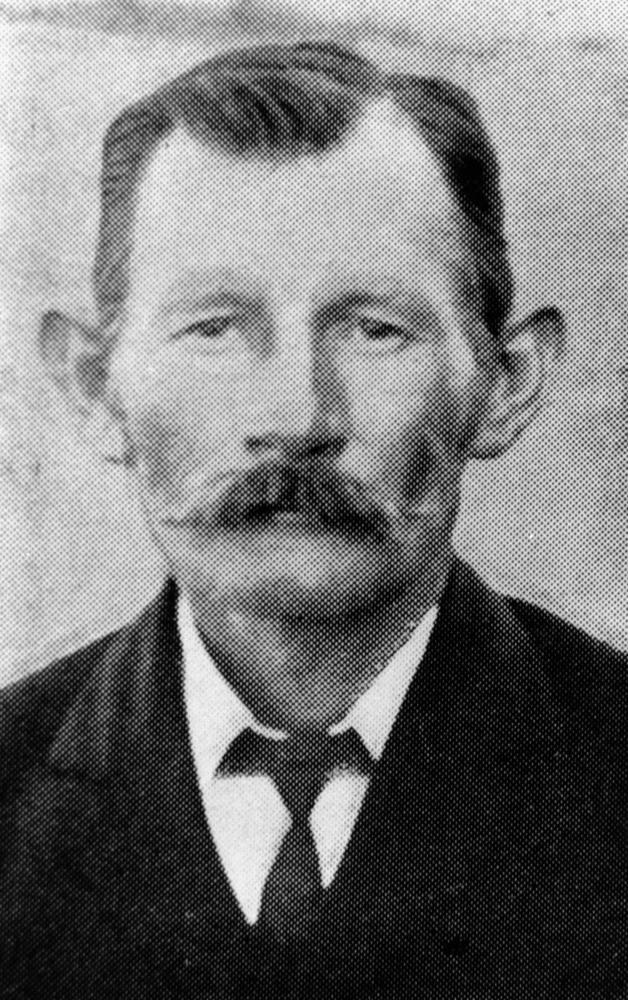
Councillor G. F. Rose, Chairman of the Beenleigh Shire Council, 1909

On 11 November 1879, the Beenleigh Division was created as one of 74 divisions within Queensland under the Divisional Boards Act 1879 with a population of 1578.

With the passage of the Local Authorities Act 1902, it became a Shire on 31 March 1903.

=== Amalgamations in 1948 ===
On 9 December 1948, as part of a major reorganisation of local government in South East Queensland, an Order in Council replaced ten former local government areas between the City of Brisbane and the New South Wales border with only four. The former ten were:

- Beaudesert
- Beenleigh
- Cleveland
- Coolangatta
- Coomera
- Nerang
- Southport
- Tamborine
- Tingalpa
- Waterford

The four resulting local government areas were:

- the new Shire of Albert, a merger of Beenleigh, Coomera, Nerang (except for the Burleigh Heads area), the southern part of Tingalpa and the eastern part of Waterford
- an enlarged Shire of Beaudesert, an amalgamation of Beaudesert and Tamborine with the western part of Waterford
- Town of South Coast, an amalgamation of the Towns of Southport and Coolangatta with the Burleigh Heads part of Nerang (which later became the City of Gold Coast)
- the new Redland Shire, an amalgamation of Cleveland and the northern part of Tingalpa (which later became Redland City)

The Order came into effect on 10 June 1949, when the first elections were held.

The former council chambers of the Shire were relocated to Beenleigh Historical Village in 1982.

== Chairmen ==
- 1880: Mr Davy, J.P.
- 1882: Isaac Shaw
- 1909: G. F. Rose
- 1927: Otto Kleinschmidt
- William Heinrich Heck (several years)
- Carl Frederich Wilhelm Rehfeldt
