= 2004 Gold Coast City Council election =

Local elections in Australia

- 27 March 2004
- Mayoral election
- Turnout: 80.9%
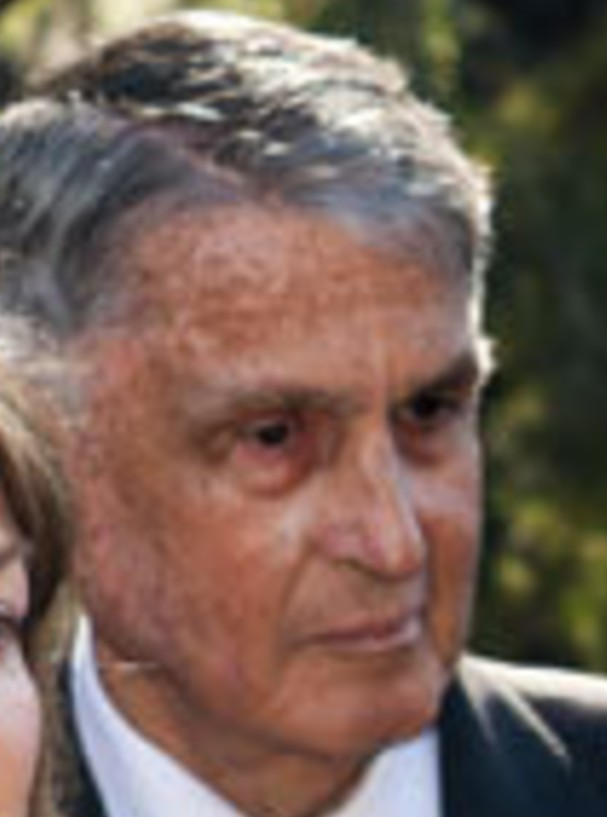

	First party	Second party	Third party
Candidate	Ron Clarke	Gary Baildon	Dean Vegas
Party	Independent	Independent	Independent
After preferences	50.37%	38.11%	11.53%
Mayor before election
Gary Baildon
Independent
Subsequent Mayor
Ron Clarke
Independent

The 2004 Gold Coast City Council election was held on 27 March 2004 to elect a mayor and 14 councillors to the City of Gold Coast. The election was held as part of the statewide local elections in Queensland, Australia.

Incumbent mayor Gary Baildon was defeated by former Olympian Ron Clarke.

== Campaign ==
Shortly before the election, prominent developer Brian Ray revealed he was the "kingmaker" who − along with several other prominent business figures − had contributed funding to a trust fund available to certain candidates, including Roxanne Scott, Brian Rowe, Greg Betts and Grant Pforr (the latter two were successful).

On the day before the election, nightclub operators spent more than $16,000 to send SMS messages to more than 75,000 people in a campaign against Gary Baildon because of a decision to reduce nightclub opening hours.

== Candidates ==
=== Mayoral candidates ===
Party	Candidate	Background
Greens	Ian Latto	Candidate for Southport at the February 2004 state election
Independent	Dean Vegas	Elvis Presley impersonator
Independent	Gary Baildon	Mayor of the Gold Coast since 1997
Independent	Ron Clarke	Olympian and businessman

=== Ward candidates ===
Ward	Held by	Candidates
Division 1	Ray Hackwood	Ray Hackwood; Linda Mina
Division 2	David Power	David Power; John Wayne
Division 3	Alan Rickard	Anne Bennett; David Childs; Grant J. Pforr; Fred Woodley
Division 4	Margaret Grummitt	Diane Brennan; Hans Heinrich; Pete Keech; Rob Molhoek; Wayne Skuthorpe
Division 5	Peter Young	Brian Rowe; Peter Young
Division 6	Dawn Crichlow	Dawn Crichlow; Roxanne Scott
Division 7	Max Christmas	Max Christmas; Julie Devery; Susie Douglas; Jim MacAnally; Don Magin; Terry Stollery
Division 8	Bob La Castra	Bob La Castra; Matthew Mackechnie; James Tayler
Division 9	Ted Shepherd	Guy Jones; Jill Pead; Ted Shepherd
Division 10	Eddy Sarroff	Steve Bryan; Niree-Anne Christison; Eddy Sarroff
Division 11	Jan Grew	Linda Brown; Jan Grew; Barry Jeffriess; Bruce Simmonds
Division 12	Peter Drake	Greg Betts; Stephen Cameron; Peter Drake; David Dunk; Scott Eade; Kevin J. Hinton; Grant O'Sullivan; Irene Wareing
Division 13	Daphne McDonald	Garry Ferrell; Daphne McDonald; Val Popova-Clark; Craig Waiwiri
Division 14	Sue Robbins	Karen Coates; Ken Hopgood; Sue Robbins; Bradley Stubbs
