= Shire of Coomera =

Local government area in South East Queensland, Australia

Coordinates: 27.8617°S 153.3128°E

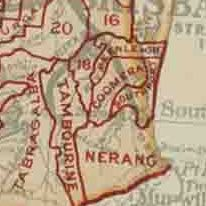
Map of Coomera Division and adjacent local government areas, March 1902. Legend: Tingalpa Division (16), Waterford Division (18), Yeerongpilly Division (20)

The Shire of Coomera was a local government area in South East Queensland, Australia. The shire, administered from Coomera, existed as a local government entity from 1879 until 1949.

== History ==
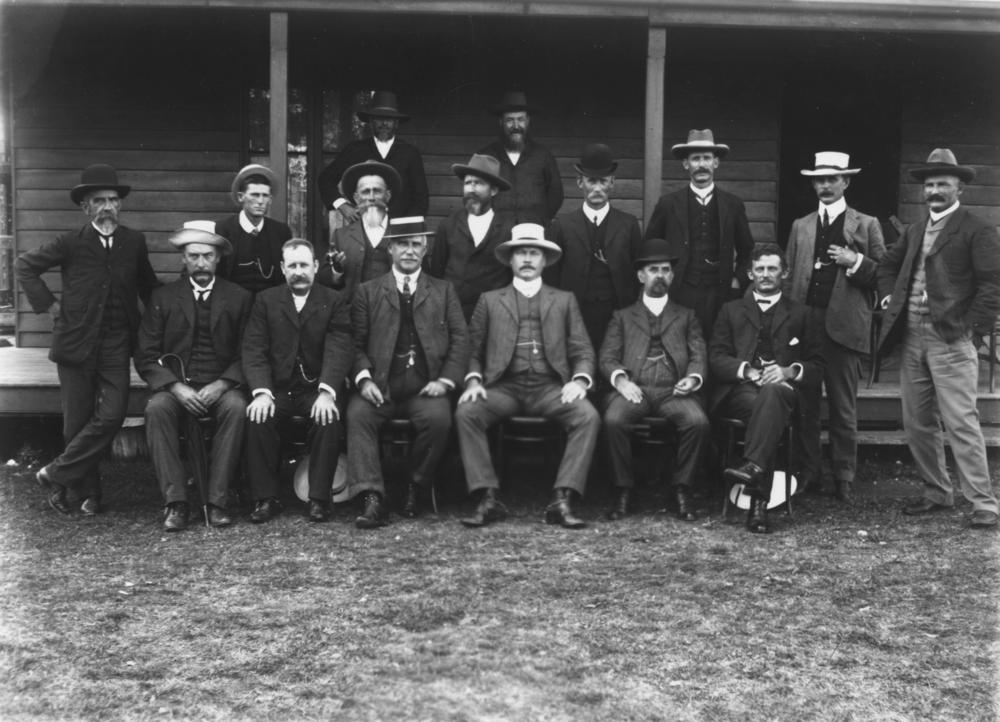
Coomera Shire Council members, ca. 1911

On 11 November 1879, the Coomera Division was created as one of 74 divisions within Queensland under the Divisional Boards Act 1879 with a population of 642.

On 6 July 1883, Southport Division was formed from part of subdivision No. 1 of Nerang Division and part of subdivision No. 1 of Coomera Division.

On 18 January 1884, there was an adjustment of boundaries between subdivision No. 1 of Tabragalba Division and subdivision No.2 of the Coomera Division.

With the passage of the Local Authorities Act 1902, the Coomera Division became the Shire of Coomera on 31 March 1903.

=== Amalgamations in 1948 ===
On 9 December 1948, as part of a major reorganisation of local government in South East Queensland, an Order in Council replacing ten former local government areas between the City of Brisbane and the New South Wales border with only four. The former ten were:

- Beaudesert
- Beenleigh
- Cleveland
- Coolangatta
- Coomera
- Nerang
- Southport
- Tamborine
- Tingalpa
- Waterford

The four resulting local government areas were:

- the new Shire of Albert: a merger of Beenleigh, Coomera, Nerang (except for the Burleigh Heads area), the southern part of Tingalpa and the eastern part of Waterford
- an enlarged Shire of Beaudesert, an amalgamation of Beaudesert and Tamborine with the western part of Waterford
- Town of South Coast, an amalgamation of the Towns of Southport and Coolangatta with the Burleigh Heads part of Nerang (which later became City of Gold Coast)
- the new Redland Shire, an amalgamation of Cleveland and the northern part of Tingalpa (which later became Redland City)

The Order came into effect on 10 June 1949, when the first elections were held.

== Chairmen ==
Chairman	Term
David Yaun	1880–1883
William Bailey	1884–1885
A. Robinson	1886
Samuel Grimes	1887
Richard Mayes	1900
J. Yaun	1904
John Beattie	1905
A. Thomson	1906
I. Hart	1907
J. Yaun	1908
T. Doherty	1909
John Joseph Johns	1910
James Frank Oxenford	1911–1913
John Siganto	1914
James Frank Oxenford	1915
Richard Mayes	1916–1917
John Beattie	1918
James Frank Oxenford	1919–1922
S. F. Walker	1922
T. Doherty	1923
A. Thomson	1923
John Joseph Johns	1924–1927
John Siganto	1927–1930
Charles Edwards	1930–1937
S. R. Black	1937–1946
William Frank Oxenford	1946–1949
