= Shire of Cleveland =

Local government area of Queensland, Australia

Coordinates: 27.5266°S 153.2664°E

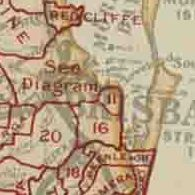
Map of Cleveland Division and adjacent local government areas, March 1902. Legend: Cleveland Division (11), Tingalpa Division (16), Waterford Division (18), Yeerongpilly Division (20), Belmont & Wynnum et al. Divisions ("See Diagram")

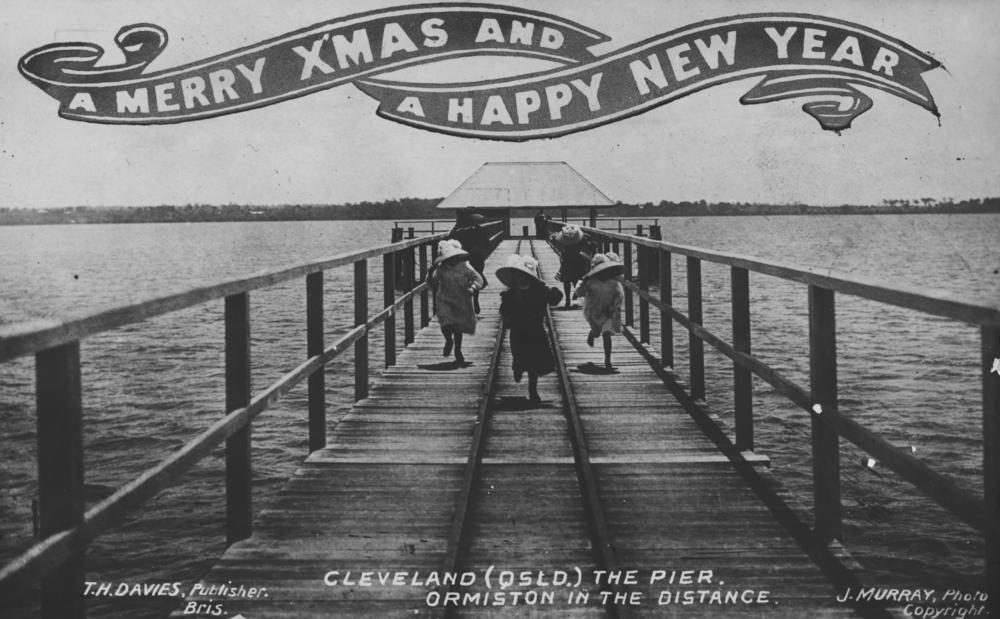
Christmas postcard featuring Cleveland pier, ca. 1908

The Shire of Cleveland is a former local government area in the south-east of Queensland, Australia, centred on the town of Cleveland beside Moreton Bay.

== History ==
On 11 November 1879, the Tingalpa Division was created as one of 74 divisions within Queensland under the Divisional Boards Act 1879. However, the residents of Cleveland sought to be independent of the division and on 29 May 1885, Cleveland Division was proclaimed as being separated from Tingalpa Division.

With the passage of the Local Authorities Act 1902, Cleveland Division became the Shire of Cleveland on 31 March 1903.

=== Amalgamations in 1948 ===
On 9 December 1948, as part of a major reorganisation of local government in South East Queensland, an Order in Council replacing ten former local government areas between the City of Brisbane and the New South Wales border with only four. The former ten were:

- Beaudesert
- Beenleigh
- Cleveland
- Coolangatta
- Coomera
- Nerang
- Southport
- Tamborine
- Tingalpa
- Waterford

The four resulting local government areas were:

- the new Redland Shire, an amalgamation of Cleveland and the northern part of Tingalpa (which later became Redland City)
- the new Shire of Albert, a merger of Beenleigh, Coomera, Nerang (except for the Burleigh Heads area), the southern part of Tingalpa and the eastern part of Waterford
- an enlarged Shire of Beaudesert, an amalgamation of Beaudesert and Tamborine with the western part of Waterford
- Town of South Coast, an amalgamation of the Towns of Southport and Coolangatta with the Burleigh Heads part of Nerang (which later became City of Gold Coast)

The Order came into effect on 10 June 1949, when the first elections were held.

== Chairmen ==
- 1895: W. Ross
- 1907: V.R.E. Drury
- 1927: George John Walter
