= Shire of Waterford =

Local government area of Queensland, Australia

Coordinates: 27.692°S 153.142°E

The Shire of Waterford is a former local government area in the south-east of Queensland, Australia, centred on the town of Waterford. It existed between 1879 and 1948.

== History ==
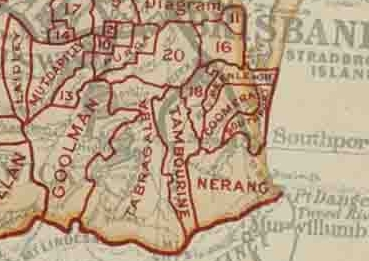
Map of Waterford Division and adjacent local government areas, March 1902. Legend: Tingalpa Division (16), Waterford Division (18), Yeerongpilly Division (20)

On 11 November 1879, the Waterford Division was created as one of 74 divisions within Queensland under the Divisional Boards Act 1879 with a population of 1567.

With the passage of the Local Authorities Act 1902, the Waterford Division became the Shire of Waterford on 31 March 1903.

On 16 August 1930, part of the Shire of Waterford was transferred to the Shire of Moreton.

=== Amalgamations in 1948 ===
On 9 December 1948, as part of a major reorganisation of local government in South East Queensland, an Order in Council replaced ten former local government areas between the City of Brisbane and the New South Wales border with only four. The former ten were:

- Beaudesert
- Beenleigh
- Cleveland
- Coolangatta
- Coomera
- Nerang
- Southport
- Tamborine
- Tingalpa
- Waterford

The four resulting local government areas were:

- the new Shire of Albert: a merger of Beenleigh, Coomera, Nerang (except for the Burleigh Heads area), the southern part of Tingalpa and the eastern part of Waterford
- an enlarged Shire of Beaudesert, an amalgamation of Beaudesert and Tamborine with the western part of Waterford
- Town of South Coast, an amalgamation of the Towns of Southport and Coolangatta with the Burleigh Heads part of Nerang (which later became City of Gold Coast)
- the new Redland Shire, an amalgamation of Cleveland and the northern part of Tingalpa (which later became Redland City)

The Order came into effect on 10 June 1949, when the first elections were held.

Thus the Shire of Waterford was abolished and split between the new Shire of Albert and the enlarged Shire of Beaudesert.

== Chairmen ==
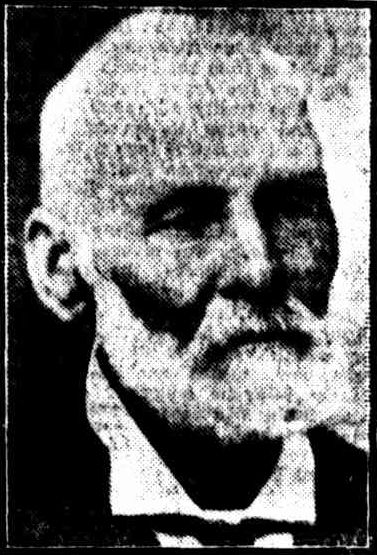
James Williamson, Chairman Waterford Divisional Board

- 1880– : James Williamson
- 1927: Martin Trangott Schneider
- Johann Gottlieb Schneider
