= Adam Darragh =

Australian basketball player

Personal information
- Born: 16 August 1979 (age 47) Gold Coast, Queensland
- Listed height: 181 cm (5 ft 11 in)
- Listed weight: 80 kg (176 lb)

Career information
- College: Martin Methodist (2001–2002)
- Playing career: 2003–2007
- Position: Guard
- Number: 20

Career history
- 2003–2005: Brisbane Bullets
- 2005–2006: West Sydney Razorbacks
- 2006–2007: New Zealand Breakers

Adam Darragh (born 16 August 1979) is an Australian professional basketball player. Born in Gold Coast, Queensland, Darragh attended Southport State High School throughout his upbringing and later enrolled in Martin Methodist College in Tennessee in 2001–02. He previously played in the Australian NBL for the Brisbane Bullets from 2003 to 2005 and the West Sydney Razorbacks during 2005–06. He then signed as a free agent with the New Zealand Breakers for 2006–07. He has also played many years in the Queensland Basketball League for the Gold Coast Rollers, his junior affiliated club.
