= 2004 Queensland local elections =

Australian local elections

← 2000	27 March 2004	2008 →

The 2004 Queensland local elections were held on 27 March 2004 to elect the mayors and councils of all local government areas in Queensland, Australia.

These were the final elections for a significant number of councils in Queensland, which were abolished in 2008 after an extensive local government reform process set up by the Beattie Government.

== See also ==
- 2004 Brisbane City Council election
- 2004 Gold Coast City Council election
