= Shire of Tingalpa =

Coordinates: 27°38′20.56″S 153°14′47″E

- Local government area
- Country: Australia
- State: Queensland
- Region: Brisbane
- Established: 1879
- Council seat: Mount Cotton

Area
  - Total: 310 km^{2} (120 sq mi)

Population
  - Total: 1,776 (1923 est.)
  - Density: 5.73/km^{2} (14.84/sq mi)

The Shire of Tingalpa was a local government area in the south-eastern suburbs of Brisbane, Queensland, Australia. The shire, administered from Mount Cotton, covered an area of 120 square miles (311 km^{2}), and existed as a local government entity from 1879 until 1949.

== History ==
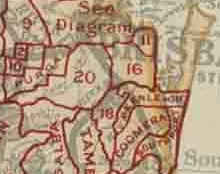
Map of Tingalpa Division and adjacent local government areas, March 1902. Legend: Cleveland Division (11), Tingalpa Division (16), Waterford Division (18), Yeerongpilly Division (20)

On 11 November 1879, the Tingalpa Division was created as one of 74 divisions within Queensland under the Divisional Boards Act 1879 with a population of 1,490.

However, the residents of Cleveland sought to be independent of the division and on 29 May 1885, Cleveland Division was separated from Tingalpa Division.

With the passage of the Local Authorities Act 1902, the Tingalpa Division became the Shire of Tingalpa on 31 March 1903.

On 1 October 1925, the shire lost areas west of the Tingalpa Creek to the new City of Brisbane.

=== Amalgamations in 1948 ===
On 9 December 1948, as part of a major reorganisation of local government in South East Queensland, an Order in Council replacing ten former local government areas between the City of Brisbane and the New South Wales border with only four. The former ten were:

- Beaudesert
- Beenleigh
- Cleveland
- Coolangatta
- Coomera
- Nerang
- Southport
- Tamborine
- Tingalpa
- Waterford

The four resulting local government areas were:

- the new Redland Shire, an amalgamation of Cleveland and the northern part of Tingalpa (which later became Redland City)
- the new Shire of Albert, a merger of Beenleigh, Coomera, Nerang (except for the Burleigh Heads area), the southern part of Tingalpa and the eastern part of Waterford
- an enlarged Shire of Beaudesert, an amalgamation of Beaudesert and Tamborine with the western part of Waterford
- Town of South Coast, an amalgamation of the Towns of Southport and Coolangatta with the Burleigh Heads part of Nerang (which later became City of Gold Coast)

The Order came into effect on 10 June 1949, when the first elections were held.

== Localities ==
- Mount Cotton
- Carbrook
- Daisy Hill
- Kingston
- Loganholme
- Loganlea
- Redland Bay
- Rochedale
- Slacks Creek
- Victoria Point
- Woodridge

== Chairmen ==
- 1880: Mr Greaves
- 1890: Hans Heinrich Heinemann
- 1927: August Stern
- Henry Heinemann (son of Hans Heinrich Heinemann)
