= Beaudesert Shire =

Coordinates: 27°59′15.01″S 152°59′43.49″E

Shire of Beaudesert
- Local government area
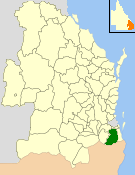
- Location within Queensland

- Country: Australia
- State: Queensland
- Region: South East Queensland
- Established: 1879
- Council seat: Beaudesert

Area
  - Total: 2,854.3 km^{2} (1,102.1 sq mi)

Population
  - Total: 62,902 (2006 census)
  - Density: 22.0376/km^{2} (57.0772/sq mi)
- Website: Shire of Beaudesert
LGAs around Shire of Beaudesert
| Ipswich | Logan | Logan |
| Boonah | Shire of Beaudesert | Gold Coast |
| Kyogle (NSW) | Kyogle (NSW) | Tweed (NSW) |

The Shire of Beaudesert was a local government area located in South East Queensland, Australia, stretching from the New South Wales border, along the Gold Coast hinterland to the urban fringes of the cities of Brisbane and Ipswich. The Shire covered an area of 2,854.3 square kilometres (1,102.1 sq mi), and existed from 1879 until its abolition on 15 March 2008, following which it was split between Logan City and the new Scenic Rim Region.

== History ==
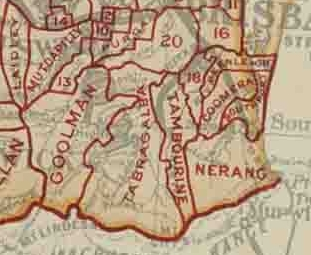
Map of Tabragalba Division and adjacent local government areas, March 1902. Legend: Yeerongpilly Division (20)

The Tabragalba Division was incorporated on 11 November 1879 under the Divisional Boards Act 1879 with a population of 869, centred on Beaudesert.

On 18 January 1884, there was an adjustment of boundaries between subdivision No. 1 of Tabragalba Division and subdivision No.2 of the Coomera Division.

With the passage of the Local Authorities Act 1902, Tabragalba Division became Shire of Tabragalba on 31 March 1903, and on 8 August 1903 was renamed Shire of Beaudesert by an Order in Council.

On 23 November 1912, a separate Town of Beaudesert was established to manage the town itself, but on 14 September 1929 it was merged back into the shire.

=== Amalgamations in 1948 ===
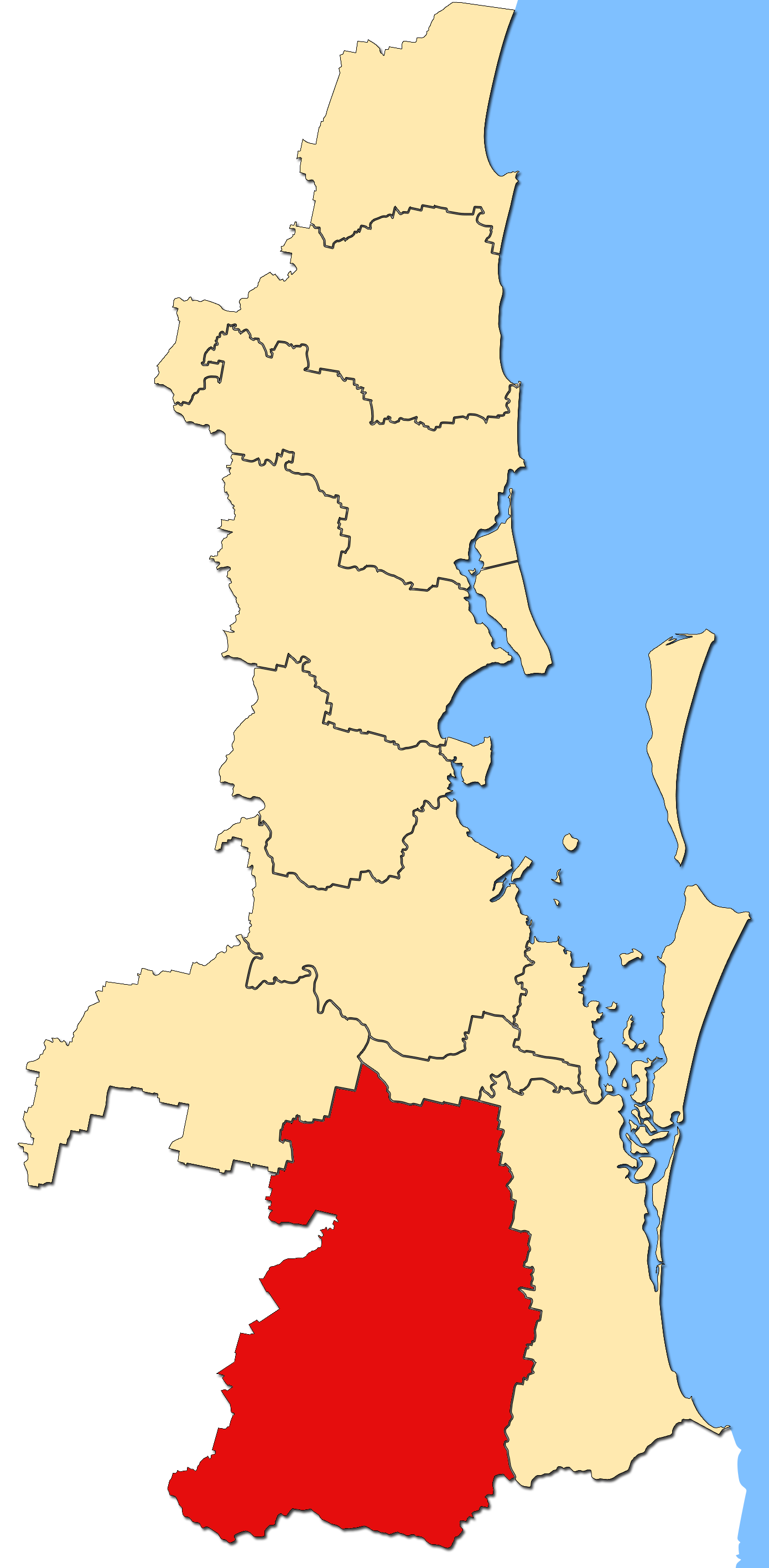
Former Beaudesert Shire

On 9 December 1948, as part of a major reorganisation of local government in South East Queensland, an Order in Council replacing ten former local government areas between the City of Brisbane and the New South Wales border with only four. The former ten were:

- Beaudesert
- Beenleigh
- Cleveland
- Coolangatta
- Coomera
- Nerang
- Southport
- Tamborine
- Tingalpa
- Waterford

The four resulting local government areas were:

- an enlarged Shire of Beaudesert, an amalgamation of Beaudesert and Tamborine with the western part of Waterford
- the new Shire of Albert: a merger of Beenleigh, Coomera, Nerang (except for the Burleigh Heads area), the southern part of Tingalpa and the eastern part of Waterford
- Town of South Coast, an amalgamation of the Towns of Southport and Coolangatta with the Burleigh Heads part of Nerang (which later became City of Gold Coast)
- the new Redland Shire, an amalgamation of Cleveland and the northern part of Tingalpa (which later became Redland City)

The Order came into effect on 10 June 1949, when the first elections were held.

The enlarged Shire of Beaudesert was split into four divisions with a total of eight councillors—Division 2 with four, Division 4 with two and the others with one each. The chairman (later mayor) was to be chosen from amongst the councillors. The new council was formally established at elections on 31 May 1949 and a Special Meeting was held on 7 June. It had grown 40% in population and gained 1,045 km^{2} (403 sq mi) in the process.

=== Growing suburbs ===
On 8 June 1978, the Shire of Logan was created out of parts of Beaudesert and the Shire of Albert. The council lost 146.1 km^{2} (56.4 sq mi) of its area and 11,550 people to Logan. At the 1979 council elections, Beaudesert was resubdivided into eight divisions each electing one councillor.

=== 2008 amalgamations ===
On 15 March 2008, under the Local Government (Reform Implementation) Act 2007 passed by the Parliament of Queensland on 10 August 2007, the Shire of Beaudesert was abolished and became one of only three Queensland councils, alongside Taroom and Tiaro, to be split in two. The northern area, which while still largely rural was part of Brisbane's growth corridor, became part of Logan City, while the southern rural section became part of the Scenic Rim Region alongside the Shire of Boonah.

Beaudesert became the administrative centre for the Scenic Rim Region and the Beaudesert Shire Council building now houses the Scenic Rim Regional Council. There are 6 Councillors and a Mayor for an area of 4,238sq km and a regional population of 38,000.

== Towns and localities ==
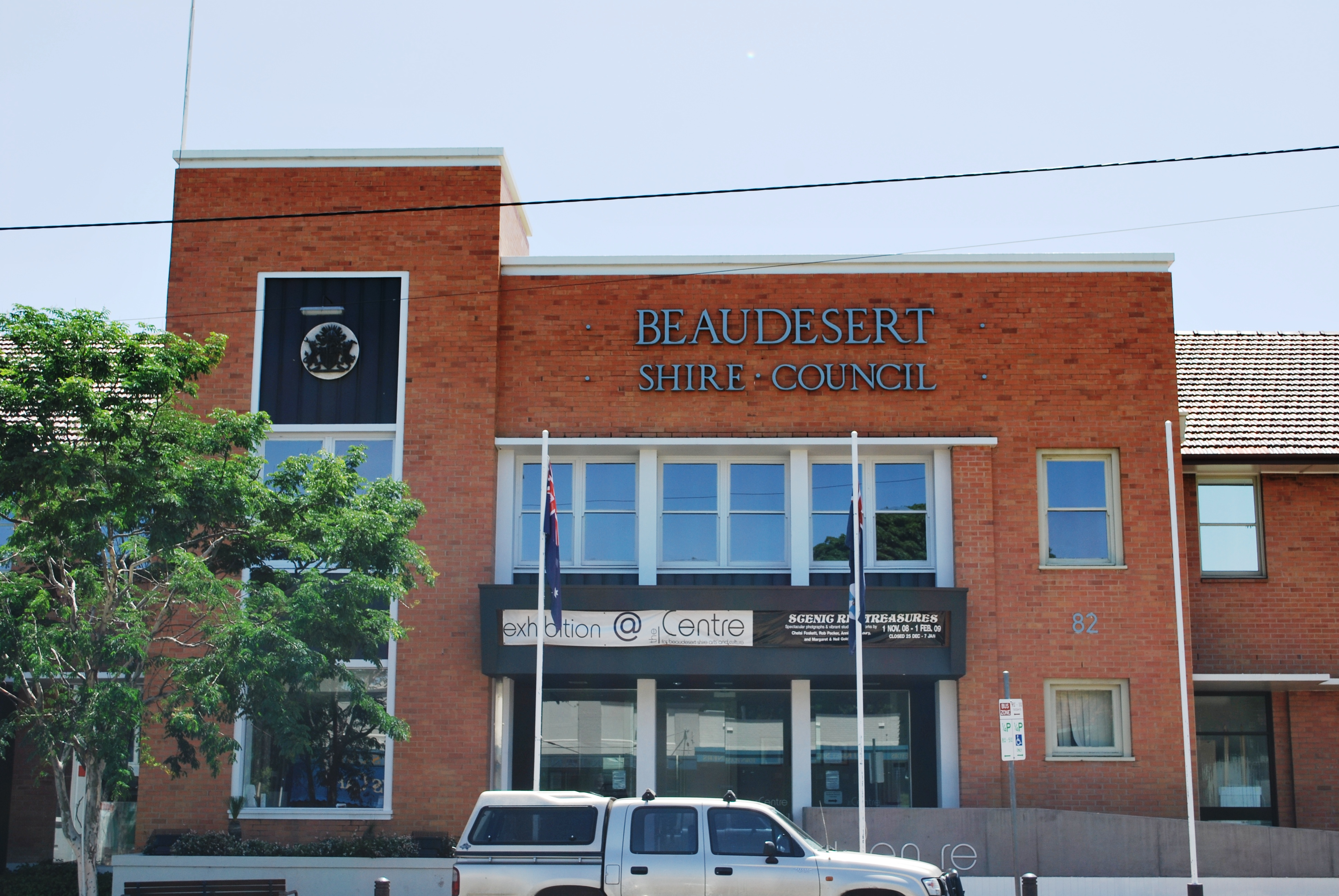
Offices of the former Beaudesert Shire Council, at 82 Brisbane Street, Beaudesert, 2008

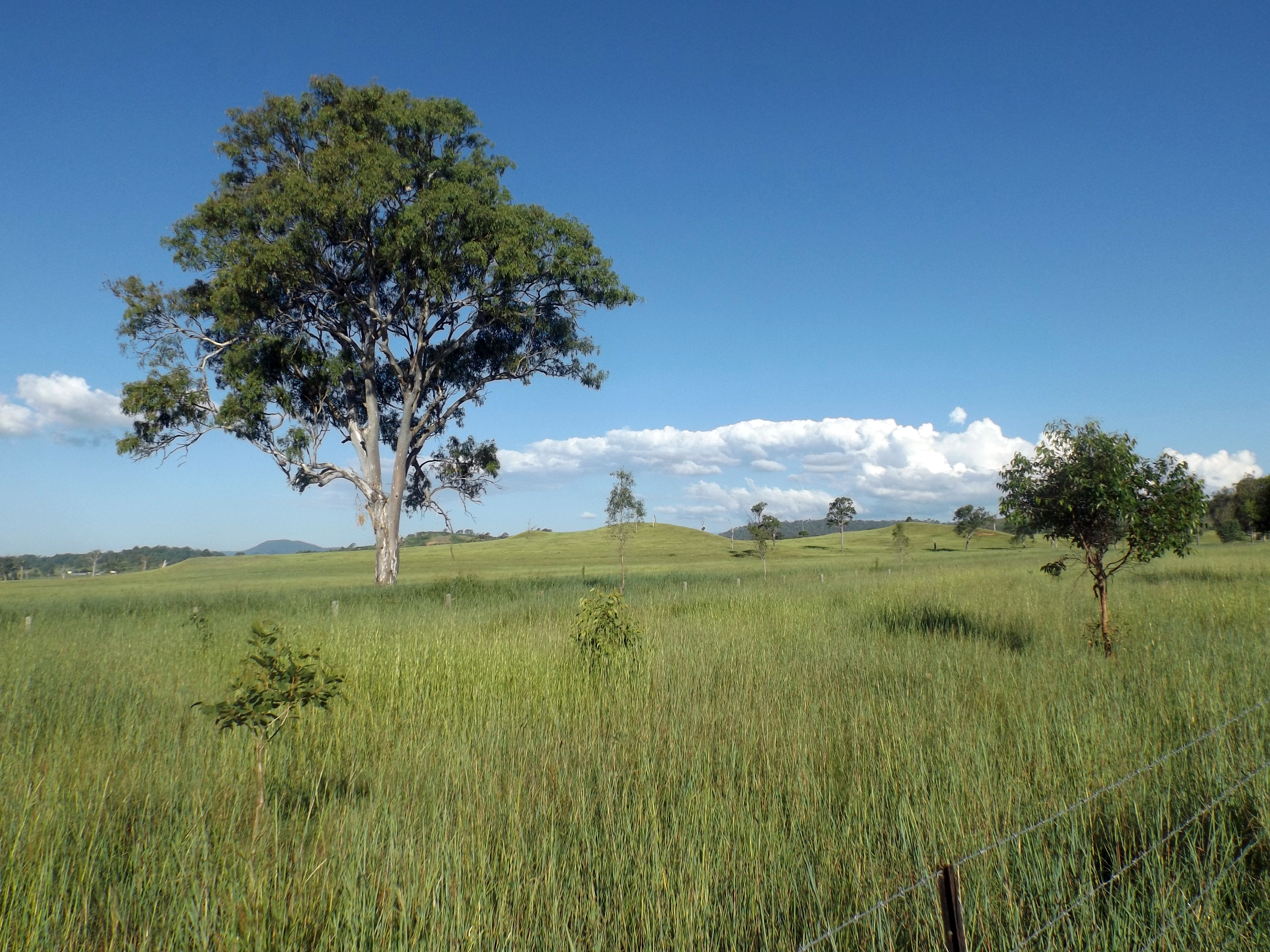
Markwell Creek Road at Cryna, 2014

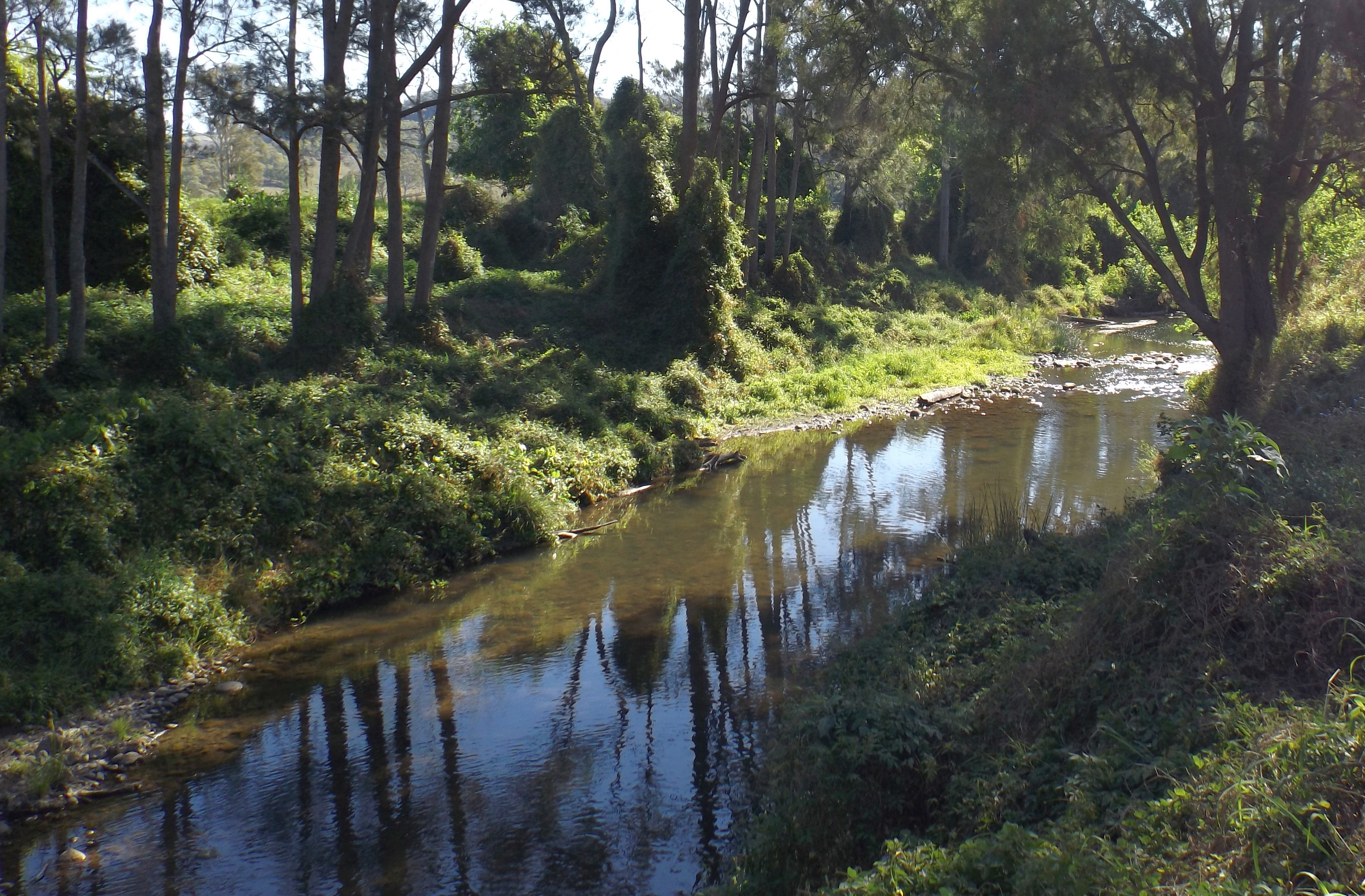
Christmas Creek at Lamington, 2014

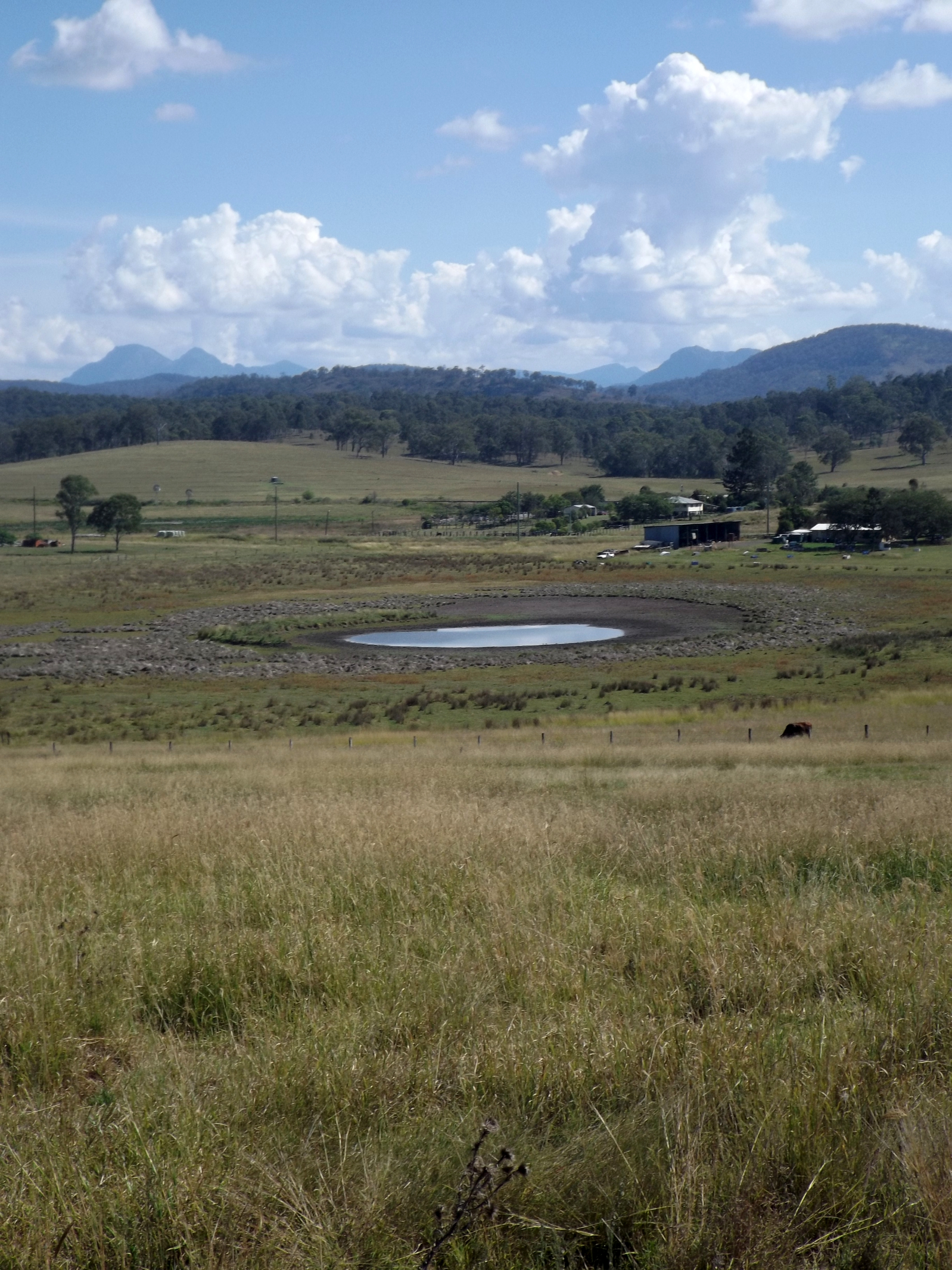
Dam and the peaks of the Scenic Rim from Tamrookum, 2014

The Shire of Beaudesert included the following settlements:

Northern Beaudesert section:

- Allenview
- Buccan
- Cedar Creek^{1}
- Cedar Grove
- Cedar Vale
- Chambers Flat
- Greenbank^{2}
- Jimboomba
- Kagaru^{3}
- Logan Reserve^{2}
- Logan Village
- Lyons
- Mundoolun
- Munruben
- New Beith
- North Maclean
- Park Ridge South
- South Maclean
- Stockleigh
- Tamborine^{3}
- Undullah^{3}
- Veresdale^{3}
- Veresdale Scrub
- Woodhill
- Yarrabilba

^{1} - split with the City of Gold Coast
^{2} - split with Logan City
^{3} - split with the Scenic Rim Region

Southern Beaudesert section:

- Beaudesert
- Beechmont
- Benobble
- Biddaddaba
- Birnam
- Boyland
- Bromelton
- Canungra
- Christmas Creek
- Cryna
- Gleneagle
- Hillview
- Innisplain
- Josephville
- Kerry
- Kooralbyn
- Lamington
- Lamington National Park
- Laravale
- Palen Creek
- Rathdowney
- Tabooba
- Tabragalba
- Tamborine Mountain
- Tamrookum
- Tamrookum Creek
- Witheren
- Wonglepong

== Population ==
| Year | Population |
|---|---|
| 1933 | 4,915 |
| 1947 | 5,368 # |
| 1954 | 9,543 |
| 1961 | 10,636 |
| 1966 | 12,095 |
| 1971 | 13,434 |
| 1976 | 20,172 |
| 1986 | 26,181 |
| 1991 | 36,349 |
| 1996 | 46,708 |
| 2001 | 53,240 |
| 2006 | 62,902 |

# The estimated 1947 population of the post-1949 area was 8,968.

== Chairmen and mayors ==
The chairmen and mayors of the Beaudesert Division and Shire of Beaudesert were:

- 1915–1916 Tom Plunkett
- 1927–1929: Joseph Hopkins
- 1949–1957: James McDonald Sharp
- 1957–1973: Euguene Tilley
- 1973–1977: Andrew Drynan
- 1977–1979: Eugene Tilley
- 1979–1991: Alan Struss
- 1991–1997: Michael Fraser
- 1997–2000: Joy Drescher
- 2000–2004: Ron Munn
- 2004–2008: Joy Drescher

The mayors of the Town of Beaudesert (1912–1929) were:

- 1916: De Burgh Bannatyne Bentinck Persse
- 1917: Stephen Mylett
- 1918–29: Montagu Selwyn Smith

== See also ==
- List of tramways in Queensland
