= Southport State High School =

Coordinates: 27°57′43.30″S 153°24′6.47″E

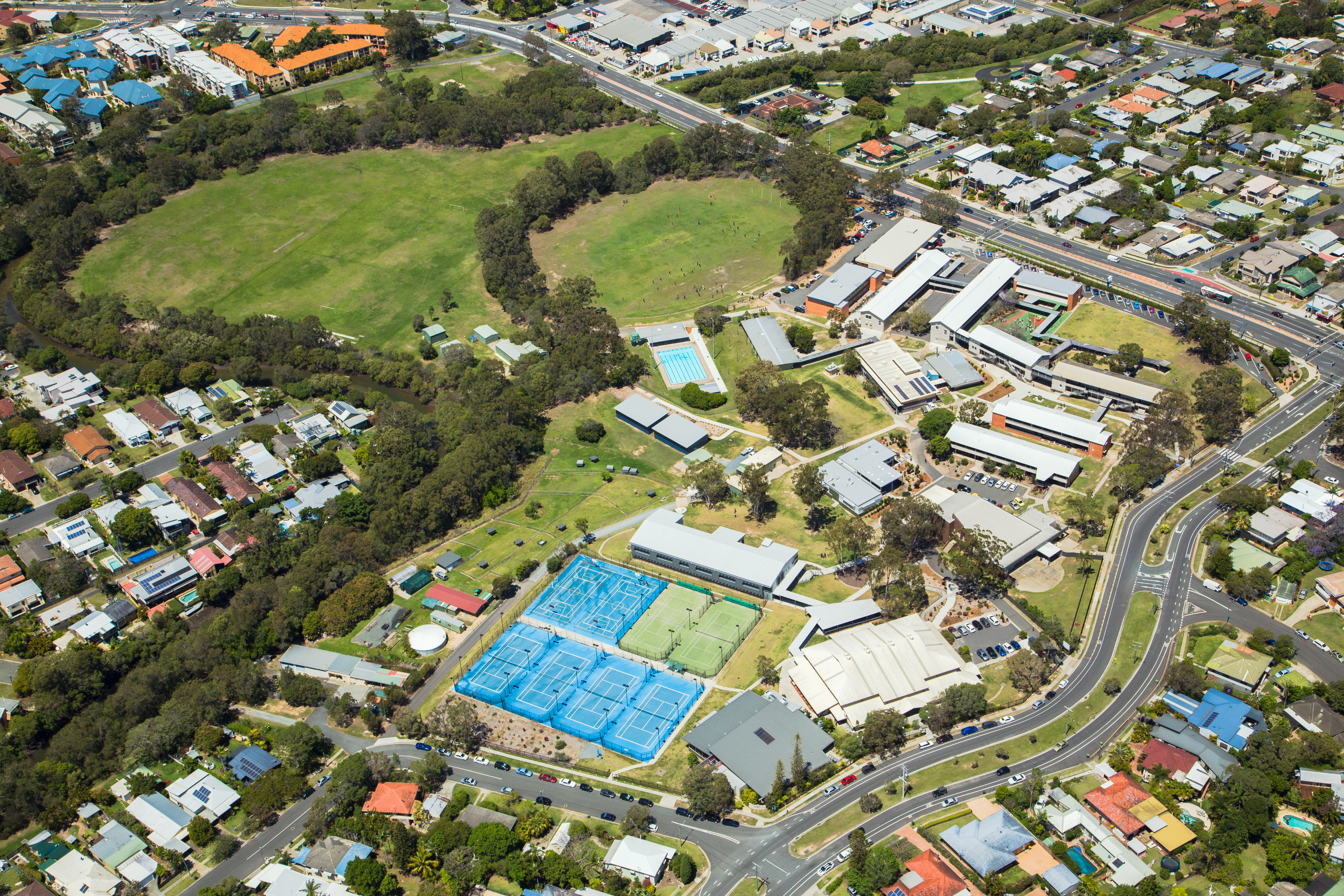
- Aerial view, 2013
- Southport, Queensland; Australia

Information
- Type: Public
- Motto: Respice Finem
- Opened: 1916
- School district: South East Queensland
- Principal: Greg Morgan
- Grades: 7–12

Southport State High School is a secondary school situated in Southport on the Gold Coast, Queensland in Australia. Southport State High School was the first public high school on the Gold Coast, celebrating its 100th centenary in 2016. 'Respice Finem' remains the school motto to this day, meaning 'look to the end result'. Some of the Southport State High School Buildings are listed on the Queensland Heritage Register.

== History ==
The Southport State School was originally built in 1879 in Scarborough Street on what is now the site for Southport Central Towers. From 1916, the primary school included a section, as a temporary measure until more suitable premises were decided upon, for students undertaking secondary education. It was this component of the school which was moved to a Smith Street location in March 1955 resulting in the creation of a custom built high school which served the entirety of the Gold Coast region.

On 4 October 2019, the school's Block B was destroyed by a suspicious fire.

== Facilities ==
- 25 metre, eight lane outdoor pool with professional instructing and swim club
- Specialist science labs
- Lecture theatre
- Specialised Junior Secondary block (Synergy Building)
- Professional tennis courts with in-house tennis professional and access available for private coaching
- Industrial kitchen
- Performing arts theatre
- Dance studio
- Music block
- Apple Mac edit suite
- Multi-purpose Sports Centre
- Tuck shop

== Excellence programs ==
Southport State High School offers excellence programs that extend high-achieving students through a range of specialist areas. These learning areas include academia, sport, music, performing arts and visual arts.

=== Academic Excellence ===
Students enrolled in the Academic Excellence Program (ACE) participate in Learning Enrichment Days and extension activities including STEM Club, Chess Club, Interact Club, Public Speaking and Debating to develop teamwork and communication skills.

=== Creative Arts Excellence ===
Students in Creative Arts Excellence regularly receive performance opportunities outside of the classroom through representation at Dramafest, Gold Coast Eisteddfod, Starbound Eisteddfod and participation at festivals and events, specialist workshops with industry professionals, excursions, school productions and musical showcases. Programs offered in Creative Arts Excellence include:

- Drama
- Music (instrument and voice)
- Visual art
- Musical theatre
- Dance

=== Sport Excellence ===
The Sport Excellence Programs are based on the 'Long Term Athlete Development' model created by Istvan Balyi. The model emphasises age-appropriate skills acquisition to maximise athletic potential. The six programs offered by Sport Excellence are:

- General sport
- AFL
- Basketball
- Netball
- Football
- Touch football

==== AFL Team Achievements ====
===== Senior Female (Years 10–12) =====
- AFL Queensland Schools Cup

(bronze) Third Place: 2018

== Apple Distinguished School ==
Southport State High School is an accredited Apple Distinguished School. The program promotes the use of Apple products by students and teachers in and out of the classroom.

== Violence ==
In 2009, a student at the school was charged with assault. In the same year, 303 students were suspended from the school. In 2014, a 14-year-old student was stabbed by his classmate.

== Notable alumni ==
- Lex Bell, politician and former Gold Coast mayor
- Annise Bradfield, Australian rules footballer with the Greater Western Sydney Giants
- Ricki-Lee Coulter, singer and television personality
- Russ Crane, former Chief of the Royal Australian Navy
- Adam Darragh, professional basketball player with the Brisbane Bullets
- Darcie Davies, Australian rules footballer with the Gold Coast Suns
- Stefan Dennis, actor on Australian soap opera Neighbours
- Olivia Gadecki, tennis player
- Michael Groom, mountaineer who famously climbed Mount Everest
- Fred Hilmer, academic and businessman
- Doug Jones, international arbitrator
- Peter Lawlor, politician
- Jodhi Meares, fashion designer and model
- Clive Palmer, politician and mining magnate
- Bob Quinn, politician
- Larry Sengstock, basketballer and former CEO of Basketball Australia
- Amy Shark, singer
- Miles Stewart, Olympic triathlete and current CEO of Triathlon Australia

== Notable staff ==
- Katrin Garfoot, former Commonwealth Games cyclist
- Steven McLuckie, former Australian rules footballer
- Jamie Stanton, Australian rules footballer with the Gold Coast Suns

== See also ==
- Education in Australia
- List of schools in Gold Coast, Queensland
