= 1995 Queensland local elections =

- 11 March 1995

The 1995 Queensland local elections were held on 11 March 1995 to elect the councils of three of the local government areas (LGAs) of Queensland, Australia.

The elections were held following several amalgamations which saw the abolishment of the Shire of Albert, Shire of Moreton and Shire of Mulgrave. Elections for these LGAs (and the LGAs they merged into) had been held only a year earlier in 1994.

== Background ==
On 19 March 1992, the Electoral and Administrative Review Commission, created two years earlier, produced its report External Boundaries of Local Authorities, and recommended a number of changes to local government boundaries and the amalgamation of some local governments.

=== Albert ===
Albert, created in 1948, had seen a rapid expansion from the late 1960s onwards. However, the Shire of Logan was separately incorporated in 1978, and Albert lost 110.0 km^{2} (42.5 sq mi) of its area and 54,650 people in the change − almost three-quarters of its population. With the astronomic growth levels experienced by the Gold Coast area from the late 1970s onwards, the new Albert grew from 18,753 at the 1976 census to 143,697 in 1991.

Although the commission's recommendations only included boundary adjustments between Albert and the City of Gold Coast, the outcome following much public debate was a decision by the Queensland Government to absorb Albert into Gold Coast City.

=== Moreton ===
Moreton was created in 1917 and represented an area surrounding, but not including, Ipswich. In 1988, the shire had a population of about 38,000 people and covered an area of 1813 square kilometres.

It merged into the City of Ipswich, although some of its boundaries fell under the City of Brisbane and the Shire of Esk.

=== Mulgrave ===
Mulgrave, formed in 1879, surrounded the City of Cairns in the Far North, and was administered from Cairns. It covered an area of 1,718.3 square kilometres (663.4 sq mi), and by the time of the 1991 census, 88% of it population resided within Cairns's metropolitan area.

The Commission recommended that the shire be merged into Cairns City, which happened when the Local Government (Cairns, Douglas, Mareeba and Mulgrave) Regulation 1994 was gazetted on 16 December 1994.
