= Ray Stevens (politician) =

Australian politician (born 1953)

Ray Stevens MP
- Stevens in 2012

Manager of Opposition Business in Queensland
- In office 31 January 2015 – 9 May 2016
- Leader: Lawrence Springborg
- Preceded by: Curtis Pitt
- Succeeded by: Jeff Seeney

Leader of the House of Queensland
- In office 30 March 2012 – 31 January 2015
- Premier: Campbell Newman
- Preceded by: Judy Spence
- Succeeded by: Stirling Hinchliffe
Shadow Ministry posts
Shadow Minister for Racing
In office 29 November 2010 – 11 April 2011
Leader	John-Paul Langbroek
Succeeded by	Tim Nicholls
Shadow Minister for Tourism
In office 6 April 2009 – 11 April 2011
Leader	John-Paul Langbroek
Preceded by	Rob Messenger
Succeeded by	Jann Stuckey
Shadow Minister for Public Works and Housing
In office 21 September 2006 – 5 April 2009
Leader	Jeff Seeney; Lawrence Springborg
Preceded by	Terry Rogers
Succeeded by	Jann Stuckey (Public Works); Rosemary Menkens (Housing)

Member of the Queensland Parliament for Mermaid Beach
- Incumbent
- Assumed office 21 March 2009
- Preceded by: Seat created

Member of the Queensland Parliament for Robina
- In office 9 September 2006 – 21 March 2009
- Preceded by: Bob Quinn
- Succeeded by: Seat abolished

Mayor of the Gold Coast
- In office 11 March 1995 – March 1997
- Preceded by: Gary Baildon
- Succeeded by: Gary Baildon

Mayor of Albert
- In office 26 March 1994 – 11 March 1995
- Preceded by: Gary Baildon
- Succeeded by: Council abolished

Personal details
- Born: 1 February 1953 (age 73) Townsville, Australia
- Party: Liberal National Party (since 2008)
- Other political affiliations: Liberal Party (until 2008)
- Children: 2
- Education: James Cook University and Macquarie University
- Occupation: Accountant, small business owner

Raymond Alexander Stevens (born 1 February 1953) is an Australian politician, currently serving as member of the Legislative Assembly of Queensland representing Mermaid Beach for the Liberal National Party. He previously served as Manager of Opposition Business in the Legislative Assembly.

== Early life ==
Born in Townsville, he received a Bachelor of Arts in Finance and Economics from James Cook University and Macquarie University, and was admitted to the Australian Association of Accountants in 1974, being employed by Price Waterhouse in Sydney. He returned to the family station, "Doncaster" in Richmond, before moving to the Gold Coast in 1979, running local businesses in the area.

== Political career ==
=== Local government ===
Stevens was a councillor on Albert Shire Council from 1988 to 1995, including a brief term as mayor beginning in 1994. After the amalgamation of Albert and Gold Coast City, he was elected mayor of the latter in 1995, serving until his defeat in 1997.

=== State parliament ===
Stevens was elected to state parliament in 2006 as the member for Robina, succeeding former state Liberal leader Bob Quinn. At this time he was also appointed as the Shadow Minister for Public Works and Housing from 2006 to 2009, with a brief stint from 2007 to 2008 as the Shadow Minister for Information and Communication Technology.

In 2008, Stevens joined the new Liberal National Party with the rest of his party. The redistribution ahead of the 2009 state election renamed his seat to Mermaid Beach; he was re-elected. And from 2009 to 2010 he was the Shadow Minister for Tourism and Fair trading, before he continued in that role as the Shadow Minister for Tourism and Racing from 2010 to 2011. From early 2011 until the election in 2012 Stevens was the Shadow Parliamentary Secretary for Racing.

With the Liberal National Party winning the 2012 Election, Stevens became the Leader of the House of Queensland and in October 2012 the Assistant Minister to the Premier on e-government.

On 11 September 2012, Stevens sparked racism claims after using the term "Jihad Jackie" in Parliament to describe opposition spokeswoman Jackie Trad (herself of Catholic-Lebanese heritage). While Stevens withdrew the remark in Parliament upon urging by house speaker, he staunchly maintained using the word Jihad to describe someone of Arabic heritage, on 11 September, was nothing he needed to apologise for. He subsequently said Trad needed to "harden up" and had a "glass jaw".

At a pre-polling booth on 21 January 2015, Stevens was filmed having a bizarre reaction to a journalist asking him questions about a $100 million sky rail project from Mudgeeraba to Springbrook. Stevens had previously stated he had approval from the Integrity Commissioner, but when the journalist asked Stevens for the Commissioner's advice to be released, Stevens refused to answer. When the journalist did not back down and asked how much he could make from the development, Mr Stevens then began to wave his hands and arms up and down in the journalist's face. "That Mermaid Ray really lost the plot, but without saying a word," Donovan said. "He started doing a dance and gyrating around — this is a Minister of the Crown, we're talking about, let me remind you."

Political offices
Preceded by Judy Spence	Leader of the House of the Legislative Assembly of Queensland; 2012–2015	Succeeded by Stirling Hinchliffe
Preceded by Lex Bell	Mayor of the Gold Coast; 1995–1997	Succeeded by Gary Baildon
Parliament of Queensland
Preceded by Bob Quinn	Member for Robina; 2006–2009	Seat abolished
New seat	Member for Mermaid Beach; 2009–present	Incumbent
