= Town of South Coast =

Local government area of Queensland, Australia

Coordinates: 27.967°S 153.407°E

The Town of South Coast was a local government area in South East Queensland, Australia.

== History ==
On 11 November 1879, the Nerang Division and Coomera Division were created as two of 74 divisions within Queensland under the Divisional Boards Act 1879.

On 14 July 1883, Southport Division was formed from parts of Nerang and Coomera Divisions.

On 9 Feb 1889, part of Southport Division was separated to be a municipal Shire of Southport but this shire was abolished on 30 June 1892 and the original division was restored.

With the passage of the Local Authorities Act 1902, the entire Southport Division became the Shire of Southport on 31 March 1903.

On 12 April 1918, the Shire of Southport became the Town of Southport.

=== Amalgamations in 1948 ===
On 9 December 1948, as part of a major reorganisation of local government in South East Queensland, an Order in Council replacing ten former local government areas between the City of Brisbane and the New South Wales border with only four. The former ten were:

- Beaudesert
- Beenleigh
- Cleveland
- Coolangatta
- Coomera
- Nerang
- Southport
- Tamborine
- Tingalpa
- Waterford

The four resulting local government areas were:

- the new Town of South Coast, an amalgamation of the Towns of Southport and Coolangatta with the Burleigh Heads part of Shire of Nerang
- the new Shire of Albert: a merger of Beenleigh, Coomera, Nerang (except for the Burleigh Heads area), the southern part of Tingalpa and the eastern part of Waterford
- an enlarged Shire of Beaudesert, an amalgamation of Beaudesert and Tamborine with the western part of Waterford
- the new Redland Shire, an amalgamation of Cleveland and the northern part of Tingalpa (which later became Redland City)

The Order came into effect on 10 June 1949, when the first elections were held.

== Controversy surrounding name ==
The proposed name South Coast was not very popular and many people agitated for a name that would better reflect the beautiful beaches and the popularity of the area for holidays, e.g. Pacific Paradise, Sun Coast. During the 1950s, the nickname Gold Coast became a popular way to refer to the South Coast area and on 23 October 1958, the Town of South Coast changed its name to Town of Gold Coast. Soon after, on 16 May 1959, it became City of Gold Coast.
