= Town of Coolangatta =

Local government area of Queensland, Australia

Coordinates: 28.1698°S 153.534°E

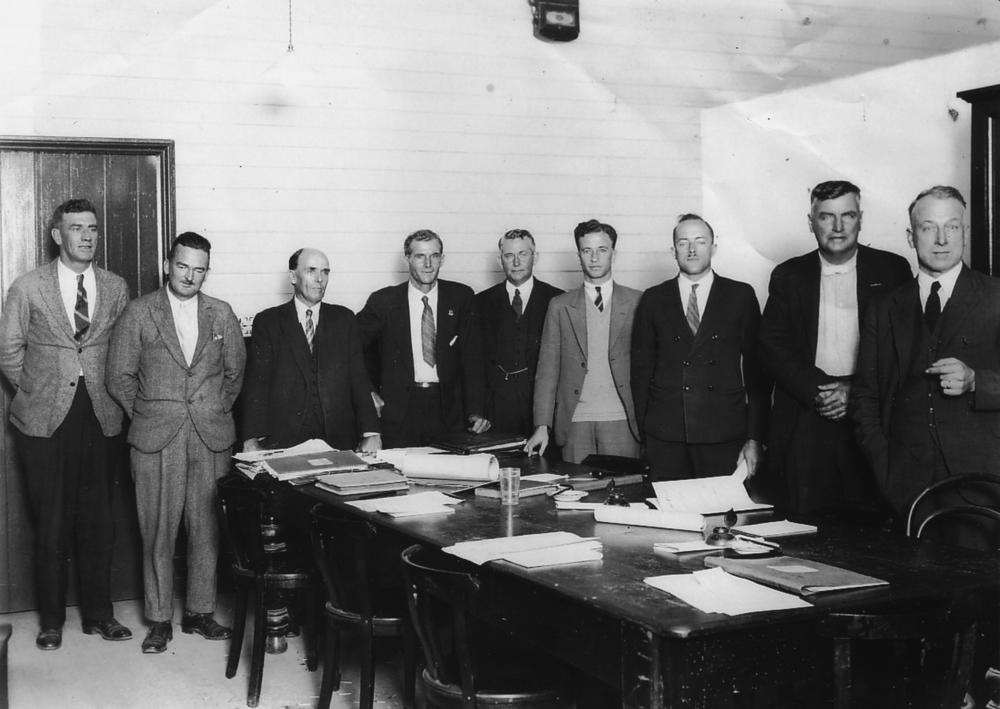
Aldermen of the Coolangatta Town Council in 1933

The Town of Coolangatta was a local government area in South East Queensland, Australia, centred on Coolangatta. It existed from 1914 to 1949.

== History ==
On 11 November 1879, the Nerang Division was created as one of 74 divisions within Queensland under the Divisional Boards Act 1879. With the passage of the Local Authorities Act 1902, Nerang Division became the Shire of Nerang on 31 March 1903.

On 12 June 1914, subdivision 3 of Shire of Nerang was separated to create the Town of Coolangatta.

=== Amalgamations in 1948 ===
On 9 December 1948, as part of a major reorganisation of local government in South East Queensland, an Order in Council replacing ten former local government areas between the City of Brisbane and the New South Wales border with only four. The former ten were:

- Beaudesert
- Beenleigh
- Cleveland
- Coolangatta
- Coomera
- Nerang
- Southport
- Tamborine
- Tingalpa
- Waterford

The four resulting local government areas were:

- Town of South Coast, an amalgamation of the Towns of Coolangatta and Southport with the Burleigh Heads part of Nerang (which later became City of Gold Coast)
- the new Shire of Albert: a merger of Beenleigh, Coomera, Nerang (except for the Burleigh Heads area), the southern part of Tingalpa and the eastern part of Waterford
- an enlarged Shire of Beaudesert, an amalgamation of Beaudesert and Tamborine with the western part of Waterford
- the new Redland Shire, an amalgamation of Cleveland and the northern part of Tingalpa (which later became Redland City)

The Order came into effect on 10 June 1949, when the first elections were held.

== Mayors ==
| Mayor | Term |
|---|---|
| John Lanham | 1914–1915 |
| John Gardiner | 1916 |
| George L. Gordon | 1917 |
| Robert George Johnston | 1918–1921 |
| John Gardiner | 1921–1924 |
| John Thomas Matters | 1924–1927 |
| R. C. Graham | 1927–1933 |
| S. W. (Bill) Winders | 1933–1946 |
| Len Peak | 1946–1948 |
