= Shire of Nerang =

Local government area of Queensland, Australia

Coordinates: 28.0590°S 153.344°E

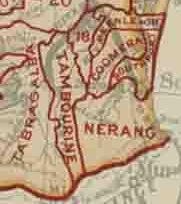
Map of Nerang Division and adjacent local government areas, March 1902

The Shire of Nerang was a local government area in South East Queensland, Australia. The shire existed as a local government entity from 1879 until 1949.

== History ==
On 11 November 1879, the Nerang Division was created as one of 74 divisions within Queensland under the Divisional Boards Act 1879 with a population of 652.

On 6 July 1883, Southport Division was formed from part of subdivision No. 1 of Nerang Division and part of subdivision No. 1 of Coomera Division.

With the passage of the Local Authorities Act 1902, the Nerang Division became the Shire of Nerang on 31 March 1903.

On 12 June 1914, part of Nerang Shire was separated to enable the establishment of the Town of Coolangatta.

In 1927 the council met in their offices at Mudgeeraba.

=== Amalgamations in 1948 ===
On 9 December 1948, as part of a major reorganisation of local government in South East Queensland, an Order in Council replacing ten former local government areas between the City of Brisbane and the New South Wales border with only four. The former ten were:

- Beaudesert
- Beenleigh
- Cleveland
- Coolangatta
- Coomera
- Nerang
- Southport
- Tamborine
- Tingalpa
- Waterford

The four resulting local government areas were:

- the new Shire of Albert: a merger of Beenleigh, Coomera, Nerang (except for the Burleigh Heads area), the southern part of Tingalpa and the eastern part of Waterford
- Town of South Coast, an amalgamation of the Towns of Southport and Coolangatta with the Burleigh Heads part of Nerang (which later became City of Gold Coast)
- an enlarged Shire of Beaudesert, an amalgamation of Beaudesert and Tamborine with the western part of Waterford
- the new Redland Shire, an amalgamation of Cleveland and the northern part of Tingalpa (which later became Redland City)

The Order came into effect on 10 June 1949, when the first elections were held.

== Chairmen ==
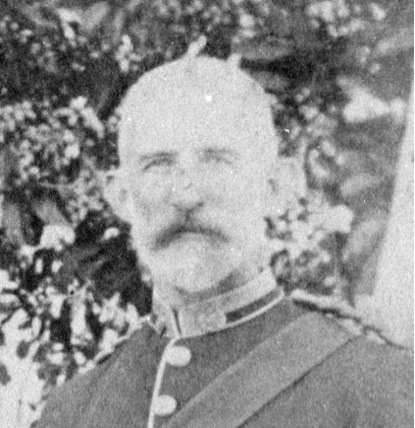
Walter John Browne, first chairman of the Nerang Divisional Board

- 1880–1881: Walter John Browne
- 1881–1884: Robert Hope
- 1914–1917: William Stephens
- 1917 – March 1928: Walter James Brake (died in office)
- April 1928 – 1948 (died in office): William Godfrey Holden (Goff) Rudd
- 1948–1949: Eric John Gaven, last chairman of Nerang Shire Council and first chairman of Albert Shire Council

William Stephens, a Member of the Queensland Legislative Assembly and a Member of the Queensland Legislative Council and mayor of the South Brisbane City Council, was a long-term councillor at Nerang, first serving in 1882 and serving for a total of 36 years.
