= Town of Southport =

Local government area of Queensland, Australia

Coordinates: 27°58′3.74″S 153°24′46.88″E

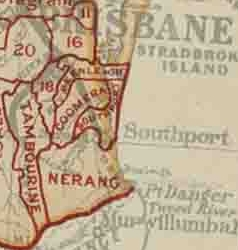
Map of Southport Division and adjacent local government areas, March 1902

The Town of Southport was a local government area in South East Queensland, Australia.

== History ==
On 11 November 1879, the Nerang and Coomera Divisions was created as two of 74 divisions within Queensland under the Divisional Boards Act 1879.

On 6 July 1883, Southport Division was formed from part of subdivision No. 1 of Nerang Division and part of subdivision No. 1 of Coomera Division.

On 6 February 1889, part of Southport Division was separated to be a municipal Shire of Southport, but this shire was abolished on 30 June 1892 and the original division was restored.

With the passage of the Local Authorities Act 1902, the entire Southport Division became the Shire of Southport on 31 March 1903.

On 12 April 1918, the Shire of Southport became the Town of Southport on 12 Apr 1918.

A new town hall was in opened in 1935 and listed on the Queensland Heritage Register in 1998.

=== Amalgamations in 1948 ===
On 9 December 1948, as part of a major reorganisation of local government in South East Queensland, an Order in Council replacing ten former local government areas between the City of Brisbane and the New South Wales border with only four. The former ten were:

- Beaudesert
- Beenleigh
- Cleveland
- Coolangatta
- Coomera
- Nerang
- Southport
- Tamborine
- Tingalpa
- Waterford

The four resulting local government areas were:

- Town of South Coast, an amalgamation of the Towns of Southport and Coolangatta with the Burleigh Heads part of Nerang (which later became City of Gold Coast)
- the new Shire of Albert: a merger of Beenleigh, Coomera, Nerang (except for the Burleigh Heads area), the southern part of Tingalpa and the eastern part of Waterford
- an enlarged Shire of Beaudesert, an amalgamation of Beaudesert and Tamborine with the western part of Waterford
- the new Redland Shire, an amalgamation of Cleveland and the northern part of Tingalpa (which later became Redland City)

The Order came into effect on 10 June 1949, when the first elections were held.

== Chairmen and mayors ==
Chairmen of the Division of Southport

Chairman	Term
Robert F. Johnston	1883, 1900–1902
William Charles Welsh	1884–1889
C. A. Beetham	1890–1891
George Andrews	1892
Thomas M. Kirk	1893–1896
W. Downs	1897
Edward Hicks	1898
Edward Proud	1899

Chairmen of the Shire of Southport

Chairman	Term
Theodor Lenneberg	1889
William Lather	1890–1891
Edward Hicks	1903, 1905, 1911
Edward Fass	1904, 1917
C. A. Beetham	1904*
Ernest Freeman	1906, 1913–1916
J. W. Proud	1907
H. Soegaard	1908
George Andrews	1909, 1912
John Siganto	1910

Mayors of the Town of Southport

Following Southport's change of status to a Town, Edward Hicks was elected its first mayor at a meeting on 11 May 1918. From then on, mayors were popularly elected at triennial elections.

Mayor	Term	Notes
Edward Hicks	1918–1921	
Edward Fass	1921–1924	
Washington Waters	1924–1927	
Joseph Hendry Grice	1927–1930	
C. H. Steadman	1930–1933	
Henry Wilson	1933–1936	
Joseph Wood Proud	1936–1948	

== Election results ==
=== 1933 ===
1933 Queensland local elections: Southport
Party	Candidate	Votes	%	±%
Independent	J. W. Proud (elected)	716		
Independent	J. R. Brown (elected)	666		
Independent	M. T. Anderson (elected)	568		
Independent	W. Waters (elected)	511		
Independent	A. R. Andrews (elected)	477		
Independent	E. H. Foreman (elected)	476		
Independent	A. A. Ledbury	475		
Independent	J. Shepard	427		
Independent	V. H. Whelan	423		
Independent	A. E. Reid	398		
