= Shire of Albert =

Coordinates: 27°59′56.32″S 153°20′19.77″E

- Local government area
- Country: Australia
- State: Queensland
- Region: South East Queensland
- Established: 1948
- Council seat: Nerang

Area
  - Total: 1,223.8 km^{2} (472.5 sq mi)

Population
  - Total: 143,697 (1991 census)
  - Density: 117.419/km^{2} (304.113/sq mi)
LGAs around Shire of Albert
| Logan | Redlands | Redlands |
| Beaudesert | Shire of Albert | Gold Coast |
| Tweed (New South Wales) | Tweed (New South Wales) | Gold Coast |

The Shire of Albert was a local government area in Queensland, located south of the capital, Brisbane, and taking in areas to the north and west of the Gold Coast. It was named after the Prince Consort of the United Kingdom, and husband of Queen Victoria, Prince Albert. When created in 1948, it was primarily a rural area, but its growth started in earnest in the late 1960s with the development of Logan on Brisbane's southern frontier. After the separate creation of Logan as a shire (later City) in 1978, Albert lost most of its population and became more centred upon the Gold Coast, which experienced a massive period of growth from then until the Shire's amalgamation with the City of Gold Coast in 1995.

== History ==
=== Divisional Boards ===
By the late 1870s, the Government of Queensland had become preoccupied with the idea of getting local residents to pay through rates for local services, which had become a massive cost to the colony and were undermaintained in many areas. The McIlwraith government initiated the Divisional Boards Act 1879 which created a system of elected divisional boards covering most of Queensland. It was assented by the Governor on 2 October 1879, and on 11 November 1879, the Governor gazetted a list of 74 divisions which would come into existence. Four of these—Nerang, Coomera, Beenleigh and Waterford—were in the Gold Coast region. Town dwellers had different needs to the rural landholders so Southport ratepayers lobbied the Queensland Government to create a separate Divisional Board so that rates monies raised by Southport landholders could be spent on town improvements. This resulted in the Southport Divisional Board on 14 July 1883.

=== Shires and towns ===
On 31 March 1903, following the enactment of the Local Authorities Act 1902, the divisions became shires. On 12 June 1914, the Coolangatta was created from part of the Shire of Nerang, and on 12 April 1918, Southport became a Town.

=== Amalgamations in 1948 ===
On 9 December 1948, as part of a major reorganisation of local government in South East Queensland, an Order in Council replacing ten former local government areas between the City of Brisbane and the New South Wales border with only four. The former ten were:

- Beaudesert
- Beenleigh
- Cleveland
- Coolangatta
- Coomera
- Nerang
- Southport
- Tamborine
- Tingalpa
- Waterford

The four resulting local government areas were:

- the new Shire of Albert: a merger of Beenleigh, Coomera, Nerang (except for the Burleigh Heads area), the southern part of Tingalpa and the eastern part of Waterford
- an enlarged Shire of Beaudesert, an amalgamation of Beaudesert and Tamborine with the western part of Waterford
- Town of South Coast, an amalgamation of the Towns of Southport and Coolangatta with the Burleigh Heads part of Nerang (which later became City of Gold Coast)
- the new Redland Shire, an amalgamation of Cleveland and the northern part of Tingalpa (which later became Redland City)

The Order came into effect on 10 June 1949, when the first elections were held.

=== Suburban growth ===
The northern part of the Shire expanded rapidly from the late 1960s onwards with the development of the Logan area, which had become a southeastern suburban growth corridor for Brisbane. A report produced in 1970 was the Albert Shire's first attempt at town planning. The first approved plan wasn't released until 1973. On 8 June 1978, the Shire of Logan was separately incorporated, and Albert lost 110.0 km^{2} (42.5 sq mi) of its area and 54,650 people in the change—almost three-quarters of its population. The effect of this change was to transform Albert into a purely Gold Coast-area council. With the astronomic growth levels experienced by the Gold Coast area from the late 1970s onwards, the new Albert grew from 18,753 at the 1976 census to 143,697 in 1991.

On 19 March 1992, the Electoral and Administrative Review Commission, created two years earlier, produced its report External Boundaries of Local Authorities, and recommended a number of changes to local government boundaries and the amalgamation of some local governments. Although their recommendations only included boundary adjustments between City of Gold Coast and Albert Shire, the outcome following much public debate was a decision by the Queensland Government to absorb Albert Shire into Gold Coast City. The Local Government (Albert, Beaudesert and Gold Coast) Regulation 1994 was gazetted on 16 December 1994, resulting in the amalgamation of the Shire of Albert into Gold Coast City at the 1995 local government elections.

== Towns and localities ==
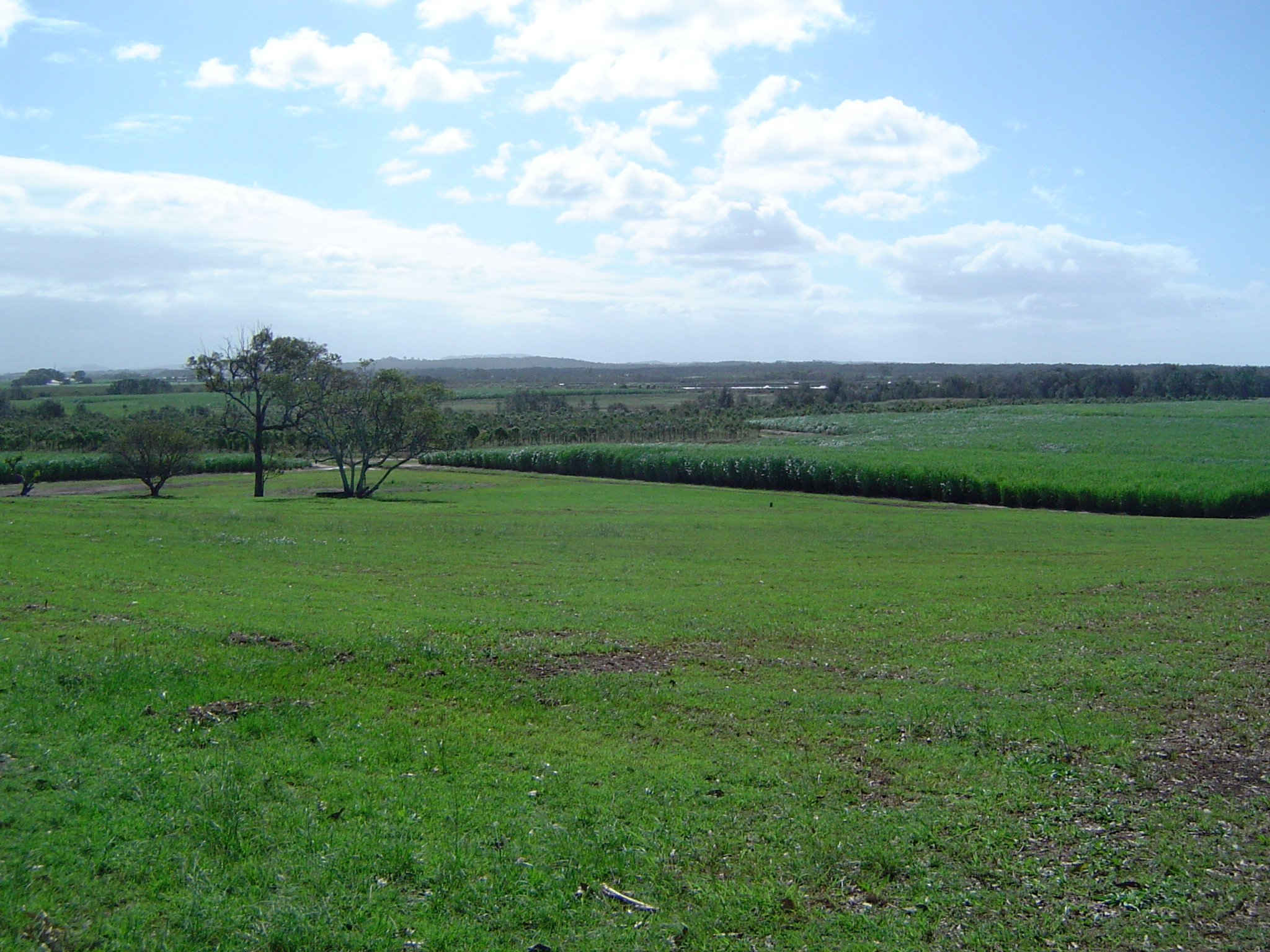
Sugar cane at Steiglitz, 2014

The Shire of Albert included the following settlements:

Gold Coast suburbs:

- Broadbeach Waters
- Burleigh Waters
- Carrara
- Clear Island Waters
- Coomera
- Currumbin Waters
- Elanora
- Gaven
- Helensvale
- Highland Park
- Hope Island
- Mermaid Waters
- Merrimac
- Nerang
- Oxenford
- Pacific Pines
- Robina
- Upper Coomera
- Varsity Lakes

Northern Albert region:

- Alberton
- Cedar Creek
- Gilberton
- Guanaba
- Jacobs Well
- Kingsholme
- Luscombe
- Maudsland
- Norwell
- Ormeau
- Ormeau Hills
- Pimpama
- South Stradbroke Island
- Southern Moreton Bay Islands
- Stapylton
- Steiglitz
- Willow Vale^{1}
- Wongawallan
- Woongoolba
- Yatala

Western Albert region:

- Advancetown
- Austinville
- Bonogin
- Clagiraba
- Currumbin Valley
- Gilston
- Lower Beechmont
- Mount Nathan
- Mudgeeraba
- Natural Bridge
- Neranwood
- Numinbah Valley
- Reedy Creek
- Springbrook
- Tallebudgera
- Tallebudgera Valley
- Tallai
- Worongary

^{1} - not to be confused with Willowvale of the Southern Downs Region

== Chairmen and mayors ==
The following served as chairmen of the Shire of Albert:

| Chairman | Term |
|---|---|
| Eric Gaven | 1949–1950 |
| Frank Oxenford | 1950–1952 |
| Alex Clark | 1952–1958 |
| Russ Hinze | 1958–1967 |
| Hugh Dunstan Muntz | 1967–1982 |
| Bill Laver | 1982–1994 |
| Ray Stevens | 1994–1995 |

In 1993, the Local Government Act Number 70 was introduced; it included that all heads of local government councils should be known as mayors and all other elected representatives were to be known as councillors.

== Population ==
The population of the Albert region is only offered from the 1947 census onwards. The 1949 Queensland Year Book (p. 42) notes the following populations.

| Local Authority | Area (sq.mi.) | 1933 | 1947 |
|---|---|---|---|
| Beenleigh | 100 | 2,322 | 2,421 |
| Coomera | 118 | 1,152 | 1,114 |
| Nerang | 245 | 3,730 | 4,029 |
| Waterford | 135 | 1,052 | 1,004 |
| Total | 598 | 8,256 | 8,568 |

The 1950 Year Book, which uses the new boundaries, gives an area of 511 sq mi (1,323 km^{2}) and a population of 7,261 (a difference of 1,307 people) for the Shire of Albert.

| Year | Population | Annual growth (%) |
|---|---|---|
| 1947 | 7,261 | N/A |
| 1954 | 8,714 | 2.64 |
| 1961 | 10,669 | 2.93 |
| 1966 | 13,782 | 5.25 |
| 1971 | 29,360 | 16.33 |
| 1976 | 72,062 | 19.67 |

Following the 1976 census, most of Albert's population were transferred to the new Logan local government area.

| Year | Population | Annual growth (%) |
|---|---|---|
| 1976 | 18,753 | N/A |
| 1981 | 54,870 | 23.95 |
| 1986 | 92,766 | 11.07 |
| 1991 | 143,697 | 9.15 |
