= Schilgen =

Schilgen is a German-language surname. Notable people with the surname include:

- Fritz Schilgen (1906–2005), German athlete
- Lennart Schilgen (born 1988), German songwriter, singer-songwriter and cabaret artist
- Philipp Anton Schilgen (1792–1857), German painter
- Wolf von Schilgen (1917–2015), Austrian author

== See also ==
- Schildgen
