= List of torchbearers who have lit the Olympic cauldron =

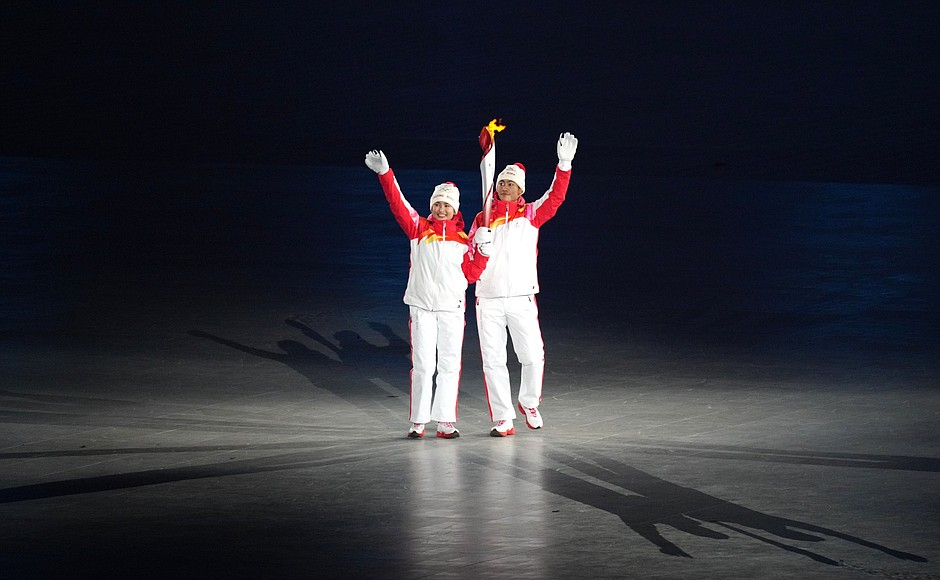
Dilnigar Ilhamjan and Zhao Jiawen lit the cauldron at the Winter Olympics in Beijing in 2022

The tradition of carrying the Olympic flame from Olympia, Greece, the birthplace of the Ancient Olympic Games, to the host city of the modern Olympic Games via a torch relay was first introduced in 1936, ahead of the 1936 Summer Olympics. Since then, famous athletes (active or retired) with significant sporting achievements while representing the host country, promising young athletes, or other individuals with symbolic significance have been selected as the last runners in the Olympic torch relay and consequently have the honour of lighting the Olympic cauldron at the opening ceremony.

== History ==
The first well-known major athlete to light the cauldron was nine-time Olympic champion Paavo Nurmi at the 1952 Summer Olympics in Helsinki. Other famous final torch bearers include 1960 decathlon gold medallist Rafer Johnson, who became the first person of African descent to light the cauldron at the 1984 Summer Olympics, French football star Michel Platini (1992), heavyweight boxing champion Muhammad Ali (1996), Australian sprinter Cathy Freeman (2000), the Canadian ice hockey player Wayne Gretzky (2010), the Brazilian marathon runner Vanderlei Cordeiro de Lima (2016) and the South Korean figure skating champion Yuna Kim (2018). Most recently, Italian alpine skiers Deborah Compagnoni, Sofia Goggia, and Alberto Tomba, all winners of gold medals, lit the Olympic Cauldron at the 2026 Milano Cortina Winter Olympics.

On other occasions, the people who lit the cauldron were not famous but nevertheless symbolized the Olympic ideals. Japanese runner Yoshinori Sakai was born in Hiroshima on August 6, 1945, the day the city was destroyed by an atomic bomb. He symbolized the rebirth of Japan after the Second World War when he lit the Olympic cauldron of the 1964 Summer Olympics. At the 1976 Summer Olympics in Montreal, two teenagers—representing the French- and the English-speaking parts of the country—symbolized the unity of Canada. Norway's Crown Prince Haakon lit the cauldron of the 1994 Winter Olympics, in honour of his father and grandfather, both Olympians. For the 2012 Summer Olympics in London, seven aspiring young athletes—each nominated by a former British Olympic champion—had the honour of lighting the cauldron.

== People who have lit the Olympic cauldron ==
Games	Location	Lighter	Sport	Note	Ref.
1936 Summer	Berlin	Fritz Schilgen	Athletics	Schilgen was not a competitor at the Olympics, but was chosen for his graceful running style.	
1948 Summer	London	John Mark	Athletics	Little-known former medical student from Cambridge University.	
1952 Winter	Oslo	Eigil Nansen	Non-athlete	Grandson of polar explorer Fridtjof Nansen. He is the first non-athlete to light the flame.	
1952 Summer	Helsinki	Paavo Nurmi	Athletics	Nurmi was a winner of nine Olympic gold medals in the 1920s; Kolehmainen won four Olympic gold medals. Nurmi lit a cauldron on field level before handing the torch to four football players who relayed the torch to the top of the tower. Kolehmainen then lit the final, higher-placed cauldron.	
1952 Summer	Helsinki	Hannes Kolehmainen	Athletics	Nurmi was a winner of nine Olympic gold medals in the 1920s; Kolehmainen won four Olympic gold medals. Nurmi lit a cauldron on field level before handing the torch to four football players who relayed the torch to the top of the tower. Kolehmainen then lit the final, higher-placed cauldron.	
1956 Winter	Cortina d'Ampezzo	Guido Caroli	Speed skating	Participant in the 1948, 1952, and 1956 Winter Olympics. Skating with the torch, he tripped over a television cable but kept the flame burning.	
1956 Summer	Melbourne	Ron Clarke (Melbourne)	Track and field	Wikne later participated in the 1964 Summer Olympics. After Wikne lit the brazier on the infield, the flame was passed on to Karin Lindberg and Henry Ericksson, who separately ran up the two towers of the Stockholm Olympic Stadium.	
1956 Summer	Melbourne	Hans Wikne (Stockholm)	Equestrianism	Wikne later participated in the 1964 Summer Olympics. After Wikne lit the brazier on the infield, the flame was passed on to Karin Lindberg and Henry Ericksson, who separately ran up the two towers of the Stockholm Olympic Stadium.	
1960 Winter	Squaw Valley	Ken Henry	Speed skating	Olympic champion in Men's 500 metres	
1960 Summer	Rome	Giancarlo Peris	Athletics	Track athlete of Greek descent. The Italian National Olympic Committee decided that the last torchbearer of the Olympics would be the winner of a junior cross country running race.	
1964 Winter	Innsbruck	Josef Rieder	Alpine skiing	Former Olympic athlete, competed in the 1956 Winter Olympics	
1964 Summer	Tokyo	Yoshinori Sakai	Athletics	Sakai was born on the same day the atom bomb exploded over his native Hiroshima. He did not participate in the Olympics.	
1968 Winter	Grenoble	Alain Calmat	Figure skating	Silver medalist at the 1964 Winter Olympics	
1968 Summer	Mexico City	Enriqueta Basilio	Athletics	Sprinter who participated in these Olympics; the first woman to light the Olympic cauldron.	
1972 Winter	Sapporo	Hideki Takada	Non-athlete	A sixteen year old Japanese student.	
1972 Summer	Munich	Günther Zahn	Athletics	Middle-distance runner. Winner of the West German junior athletics championships.	
1976 Winter	Innsbruck	Christl Haas	Alpine skiing	Haas won gold on downhill in 1964 Winter Olympics; Feistmantl won luge doubles in the same Games.	
1976 Winter	Innsbruck	Josef Feistmantl	Luge	Haas won gold on downhill in 1964 Winter Olympics; Feistmantl won luge doubles in the same Games.	
1976 Summer	Montreal	Sandra Henderson	Gymnastics	Two teenagers representing English and French Canadians. Neither of them participated in any Olympics.	
1976 Summer	Montreal	Stéphane Préfontaine	Athletics	Two teenagers representing English and French Canadians. Neither of them participated in any Olympics.	
1980 Winter	Lake Placid	Charles Morgan Kerr	Non-athlete	A psychiatrist from Arizona who had been elected from all 52 torch relay bearers to run the final leg.	
1980 Summer	Moscow	Sergei Belov	Basketball	Member of the Soviet basketball team, Olympic Champion at the 1972 Summer Olympics.	
1984 Winter	Sarajevo	Sanda Dubravčić	Figure skating	Best placed Winter Olympic athlete from the former Yugoslavia until that date. She finished 10th in the ladies figure skating event at the 1980 Winter Olympics.	
1984 Summer	Los Angeles	Rafer Johnson	Athletics	Olympic Champion at the Men's decathlon at 1960 Summer Olympics; the first person of African descent to light the Olympic cauldron.	
1988 Winter	Calgary	Robyn Perry	Figure skating	A 12-year-old schoolgirl and aspiring figure skater. Perry's choice symbolized the future of the Olympic movement, since in 1986, the International Olympic Committee had decided to implement new policies, including the change in the cycle between the Summer and Winter Olympic Games.	
1988 Summer	Seoul	Chung Sun-man	Non-athlete	Chung Sun-man was a schoolteacher. Sohn was a young Korean dancer. Kim Won-tak was a young track athlete who took part in that Games' marathon.	
1988 Summer	Seoul	Sohn Mi-chung	Non-athlete	Chung Sun-man was a schoolteacher. Sohn was a young Korean dancer. Kim Won-tak was a young track athlete who took part in that Games' marathon.	
1988 Summer	Seoul	Kim Won-tak	Athletics	Chung Sun-man was a schoolteacher. Sohn was a young Korean dancer. Kim Won-tak was a young track athlete who took part in that Games' marathon.	
1992 Winter	Albertville	Michel Platini	Association football	Platini took part with the French football team in the 1976 Summer Olympics. Grange was a future alpine skier (and older brother of future multiple-time alpine skiing Slalom world champion Jean-Baptiste Grange). Aged nine at the time, Grange became the youngest final lighter in history.	
1992 Winter	Albertville	François-Cyrille Grange	Alpine skiing	Platini took part with the French football team in the 1976 Summer Olympics. Grange was a future alpine skier (and older brother of future multiple-time alpine skiing Slalom world champion Jean-Baptiste Grange). Aged nine at the time, Grange became the youngest final lighter in history.	
1992 Summer	Barcelona	Antonio Rebollo	Archery	Paralympian who competed in the 1984, 1988, and 1992 Summer Paralympics, winning two silvers and a bronze. The only Paralympian ever to light the Olympic cauldron, Rebollo shot a flaming arrow over an open natural gas cauldron to ignite it.	
1994 Winter	Lillehammer	Haakon, Crown Prince of Norway	Non-athlete	then-Heir apparent to the throne of Norway. Though he was not an Olympian, both his father and grandfather took part in the Olympics and he lit the cauldron on their behalf. He was also the patron of the Games and his involvement was crucial to their realization. Also, his father declared the games opened.	
1996 Summer	Atlanta	Muhammad Ali	Boxing	1960 Summer Olympics light heavyweight boxing gold medalist; the first Muslim to light the Olympic cauldron.	
1998 Winter	Nagano	Midori Ito	Figure skating	Silver medalist at the 1992 Winter Olympics	
2000 Summer	Sydney	Cathy Freeman	Track and field	Silver medalist in 1996 and would later win at these games, both in the 400 metres. She is one of two people to light the cauldron and win a gold medal in the same games, alongside Teddy Riner. Cathy was also chosen as part of the celebration of 100 years of women being included in the Olympics, she was passed the Olympic flame in the final lighting of the flame by 5 other Australian women who are significant in Australian Olympic history. She is also the first person of indigenous descent to light the cauldron.	
2002 Winter	Salt Lake City	The 1980 U.S. Olympic ice hockey team	Ice hockey	The "Miracle on Ice" hockey team who upset the Soviet hockey team en route to the gold medal.	
2004 Summer	Athens	Nikolaos Kaklamanakis	Sailing	Winner of Olympic gold in 1996 and would win a silver in these Olympics.	
2006 Winter	Turin	Stefania Belmondo	Cross-country skiing	Winner of ten Olympic medals between 1992 and 2002, two of them gold. One of Italy's most decorated Olympians.	
2008 Summer	Beijing	Li Ning	Artistic gymnastics	Li won 6 medals (3 gold,2 silvers and 1 bronze) at the 1984 Summer Olympics. He was China's most successful athlete at their first Olympic appearance since 1952.	
2010 Winter	Vancouver	Steve Nash (indoor cauldron)	Basketball	Le May Doan was a winner of two gold medals in the 500 m in 1998 and 2002 and a bronze in the 1000 m in 1998. Nash is a two-time NBA MVP with the Phoenix Suns and a former member of the Canadian Olympic Basketball team, playing in 2000 Summer Olympics. Greene won gold in the giant slalom and silver in the slalom in 1968 Winter Olympics. Gretzky was a member of the Canadian ice hockey team and won four Stanley Cup titles as captain of the Edmonton Oilers (1984, 1985, 1987, 1988). He was the executive director of the Canadian men's hockey team in 2002, who won gold at that Games. During the opening ceremony, Nash and Greene lit a cauldron inside the BC Place indoor stadium. Gretzky then lit a second, outdoor cauldron near the Vancouver Convention Centre. Only the outdoor cauldron remained lit throughout the Games. Le May Doan was supposed to participate in the lighting of the indoor cauldron, but was left out when one of the four arms failed to raise due to mechanical problems. This was corrected at the beginning of the closing ceremony, when a joke was made about the mechanical error, and she was able to light the newly emerged fourth arm and relight the indoor cauldron to begin the closing ceremony.	
2010 Winter	Vancouver	Nancy Greene Raine (indoor cauldron)	Alpine skiing		
2010 Winter	Vancouver	Wayne Gretzky (outdoor cauldron)	Ice hockey		
2010 Winter	Vancouver	Catriona Le May Doan (closing ceremony)	Speed skating		
2012 Summer	London	Desirèe Henry	Track and field	The cauldron was lit by seven teenagers, each nominated by a veteran British Olympian: Airlie (Shirley Robertson); Duckitt (Duncan Goodhew); Henry (Daley Thompson); Kirk (Dame Mary Peters); MacRitchie (Sir Steve Redgrave); Reynolds (Lynn Davies); Tracey (Dame Kelly Holmes); Austin Playfoot later relit the cauldron in its new spot in the Olympic Stadium. Duckitt was the only non-athlete among them. Henry would later go on to win an Olympic bronze medal in the 4 × 100 m in 2016.	
2012 Summer	London	Katie Kirk	Track and field	The cauldron was lit by seven teenagers, each nominated by a veteran British Olympian: Airlie (Shirley Robertson); Duckitt (Duncan Goodhew); Henry (Daley Thompson); Kirk (Dame Mary Peters); MacRitchie (Sir Steve Redgrave); Reynolds (Lynn Davies); Tracey (Dame Kelly Holmes); Austin Playfoot later relit the cauldron in its new spot in the Olympic Stadium. Duckitt was the only non-athlete among them. Henry would later go on to win an Olympic bronze medal in the 4 × 100 m in 2016.	
2012 Summer	London	Aidan Reynolds	Track and field	The cauldron was lit by seven teenagers, each nominated by a veteran British Olympian: Airlie (Shirley Robertson); Duckitt (Duncan Goodhew); Henry (Daley Thompson); Kirk (Dame Mary Peters); MacRitchie (Sir Steve Redgrave); Reynolds (Lynn Davies); Tracey (Dame Kelly Holmes); Austin Playfoot later relit the cauldron in its new spot in the Olympic Stadium. Duckitt was the only non-athlete among them. Henry would later go on to win an Olympic bronze medal in the 4 × 100 m in 2016.	
2012 Summer	London	Adelle Tracey	Track and field	The cauldron was lit by seven teenagers, each nominated by a veteran British Olympian: Airlie (Shirley Robertson); Duckitt (Duncan Goodhew); Henry (Daley Thompson); Kirk (Dame Mary Peters); MacRitchie (Sir Steve Redgrave); Reynolds (Lynn Davies); Tracey (Dame Kelly Holmes); Austin Playfoot later relit the cauldron in its new spot in the Olympic Stadium. Duckitt was the only non-athlete among them. Henry would later go on to win an Olympic bronze medal in the 4 × 100 m in 2016.	
2012 Summer	London	Callum Airlie	Sailing	The cauldron was lit by seven teenagers, each nominated by a veteran British Olympian: Airlie (Shirley Robertson); Duckitt (Duncan Goodhew); Henry (Daley Thompson); Kirk (Dame Mary Peters); MacRitchie (Sir Steve Redgrave); Reynolds (Lynn Davies); Tracey (Dame Kelly Holmes); Austin Playfoot later relit the cauldron in its new spot in the Olympic Stadium. Duckitt was the only non-athlete among them. Henry would later go on to win an Olympic bronze medal in the 4 × 100 m in 2016.	
2012 Summer	London	Jordan Duckitt	Non-athlete (Young Ambassadors Group)	The cauldron was lit by seven teenagers, each nominated by a veteran British Olympian: Airlie (Shirley Robertson); Duckitt (Duncan Goodhew); Henry (Daley Thompson); Kirk (Dame Mary Peters); MacRitchie (Sir Steve Redgrave); Reynolds (Lynn Davies); Tracey (Dame Kelly Holmes); Austin Playfoot later relit the cauldron in its new spot in the Olympic Stadium. Duckitt was the only non-athlete among them. Henry would later go on to win an Olympic bronze medal in the 4 × 100 m in 2016.	
2012 Summer	London	Cameron MacRitchie	Rowing	The cauldron was lit by seven teenagers, each nominated by a veteran British Olympian: Airlie (Shirley Robertson); Duckitt (Duncan Goodhew); Henry (Daley Thompson); Kirk (Dame Mary Peters); MacRitchie (Sir Steve Redgrave); Reynolds (Lynn Davies); Tracey (Dame Kelly Holmes); Austin Playfoot later relit the cauldron in its new spot in the Olympic Stadium. Duckitt was the only non-athlete among them. Henry would later go on to win an Olympic bronze medal in the 4 × 100 m in 2016.	
2014 Winter	Sochi	Irina Rodnina	Figure skating	Both former Russian athletes won three gold medals at the Winter Olympics: Rodnina in figure skating and Tretiak in ice hockey (in addition to a silver)	
2014 Winter	Sochi	Vladislav Tretiak	Ice hockey	Both former Russian athletes won three gold medals at the Winter Olympics: Rodnina in figure skating and Tretiak in ice hockey (in addition to a silver)	
2016 Summer	Rio de Janeiro	Vanderlei Cordeiro de Lima (stadium cauldron)	Athletics	Winner of the bronze medal in the marathon of the 2004 Summer Olympics. Cordeiro de Lima was the first Latin American awarded the Pierre de Coubertin Medal after he was deliberately interrupted during that event.	
2016 Summer	Rio de Janeiro	Jorge Gomes (public cauldron)	Athletics	A second, outdoor cauldron was lit in front of Candelaria Church by a 14-year-old, who was part of a sports project in Rio de Janeiro.	
2018 Winter	Pyeongchang	Yuna Kim	Figure skating	Winner of Olympic gold in the ladies' singles in 2010 and silver in 2014.	
2020 Summer (Note: Held in 2021 due to the COVID-19 pandemic.)	Tokyo	Naomi Osaka (stadium cauldron)	Tennis	Japanese tennis player who participated in the Games, winner of four singles Grand Slams, and world #2 player at the time of the Games.	
2020 Summer	Tokyo	Ayaka Takahashi (public cauldron)	Badminton	A second, outdoor cauldron was lit at the Ariake Yume-no-Ohashi Bridge in Tokyo Waterfront by retired Japanese badminton player who won gold in 2016.	
2022 Winter	Beijing	Dilnigar Ilhamjan	Cross-country skiing	Cross-country skier Dilnigar Ilhamjan (Dinigeer Yilamujiang) and Nordic combined athlete Zhao Jiawen, both born in the 2000s, had the honour of lighting the Cauldron. Dilnigar qualified for the Beijing 2022, having become the first Chinese cross-country skiing medalist in an International Ski Federation-level event, finishing second in the opening women's leg of a three-leg sprint series in Beijing in March 2019. Zhao became the first Chinese athlete to compete in Nordic combined in a Winter Olympic Games. Three similar snowflakes were also erected as public flames, with one outside of the stadium lit by a volunteer, one in Yanqing District lit by speed skater Yu Jongjun, and the third in Zhangjiakou lit by skier Wang Wezhuo.	
2022 Winter	Beijing	Zhao Jiawen	Nordic combined		
2024 Summer	Paris	Marie-José Pérec	Athletics	Olympic champion at the Women's 400 metres at the 1992 Summer Olympics, Women's 200 metres at the 1996 Summer Olympics and the Women's 400 metres at the 1996 Summer Olympics.	
2024 Summer	Paris	Teddy Riner	Judo	Olympic champion in the superheavyweight category at the 2012 and 2016 games, the mixed team competition at the 2020 games and bronze medalist on same category at the 2008 and the 2020. He would go on to win the superheavyweight category at these same games, making him one of only two athletes to light the cauldron and win a gold medal at the same games after Cathy Freeman.	
2026 Winter	Milan and Cortina d'Ampezzo	Deborah Compagnoni (Milan cauldron)	Alpine skiing	Olympic champion at the Women's super-G at 1992 Winter Olympics, Women's giant slalom at the 1994 Winter Olympics, and the Women's giant slalom at the 1998 Winter Olympics.	
2026 Winter	Milan and Cortina d'Ampezzo	Sofia Goggia (Cortina d'Ampezzo cauldron)	Alpine skiing	Olympic champion at the Women's downhill at the 2018 Winter Olympics.	
2026 Winter	Milan and Cortina d'Ampezzo	Alberto Tomba (Milan cauldron)	Alpine skiing	Olympic champion at the Men's slalom and the Men's giant slalom at the 1988 Winter Olympics.	

=== Youth Olympics ===
Games	Location	Lighter	Sport	Note	Ref.
2010 Summer Youth	Singapore	Darren Choy	Sailing	A Singaporean sailor who participated in the Games.	
2012 Winter Youth	Innsbruck	Egon Zimmermann	Alpine skiing	Both Zimmerman and Klammer won the gold in the downhill event in 1964 and 1976 respectively, both years when Austria previously hosted the Winter Olympics. Gerstgraser was an athlete of the Austrian delegation competing in the Games.	
2012 Winter Youth	Innsbruck	Franz Klammer	Alpine skiing	Both Zimmerman and Klammer won the gold in the downhill event in 1964 and 1976 respectively, both years when Austria previously hosted the Winter Olympics. Gerstgraser was an athlete of the Austrian delegation competing in the Games.	
2012 Winter Youth	Innsbruck	Paul Gerstgraser	Nordic combined	Both Zimmerman and Klammer won the gold in the downhill event in 1964 and 1976 respectively, both years when Austria previously hosted the Winter Olympics. Gerstgraser was an athlete of the Austrian delegation competing in the Games.	
2014 Summer Youth	Nanjing	Chen Ruolin	Diving	Winner of back-to-back gold medals in diving in 2008 and 2012 Summer Olympics, in the 10 m and the 10 m synchronized. She would retain the latter's gold medal in 2016 Summer Olympics.	
2016 Winter Youth	Lillehammer	Princess Ingrid Alexandra of Norway	Non-athlete	Elder child of Crown Prince Haakon, who previously lit the cauldron in the 1994 Winter Olympics. Her grandfather declared the Games open.	
2018 Summer Youth	Buenos Aires	Santiago Lange	Sailing	As Buenos Aires 2018 was the first edition of an Olympic competition with gender equality, the lighting of the cauldron was carried out by a woman and a man. Pareto won bronze at Beijing 2008 and gold at Rio 2016 Olympics; Lange, won bronze at Athens 2004 and Beijing 2008 Olympics and was Olympic champion at Rio 2016 Games.	
2018 Summer Youth	Buenos Aires	Paula Pareto	Judo	As Buenos Aires 2018 was the first edition of an Olympic competition with gender equality, the lighting of the cauldron was carried out by a woman and a man. Pareto won bronze at Beijing 2008 and gold at Rio 2016 Olympics; Lange, won bronze at Athens 2004 and Beijing 2008 Olympics and was Olympic champion at Rio 2016 Games.	
2020 Winter Youth	Lausanne	Gina Zehnder	Figure skating	Youngest athlete of the Swiss delegation competing in the Games.	
2024 Winter Youth	Gangwon	Lee Jeong-min	Freestyle skiing	Youngest athlete of the South Korean delegation competing in the Games.	
2026 Summer Youth	Dakar	Abdourahmane Marième Sy	Fencing	Both were selected to represent the next generation of athletes in Senegalese sport.	
2026 Summer Youth	Dakar	Aïcha Diop	Judo	Both were selected to represent the next generation of athletes in Senegalese sport.	

== See also ==
- Olympic flame
- List of Olympic torch relays
