= Kim Won-tak =

South Korean runner (born 1964)

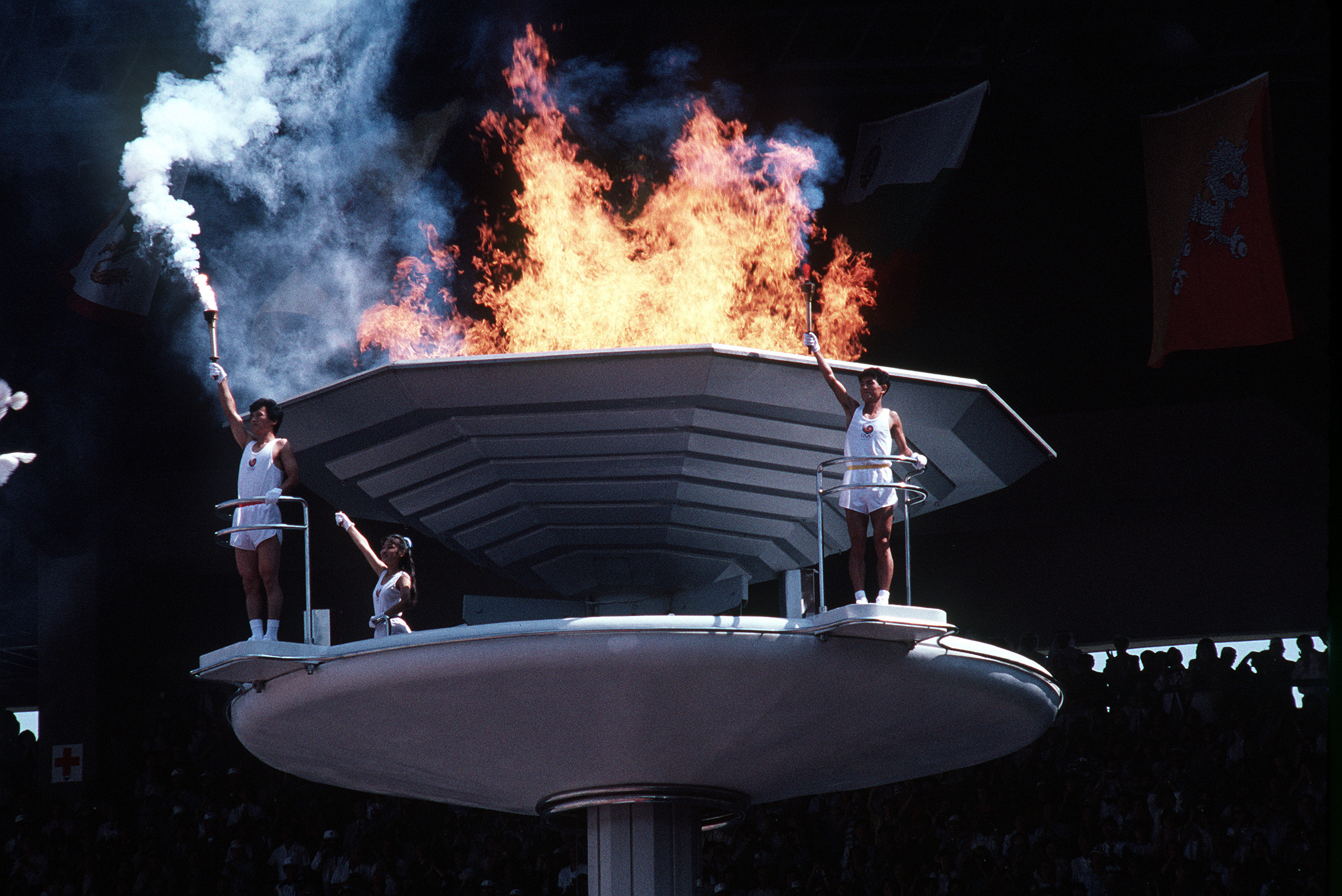
- Kim Won-Tak, Chong Son-man (teacher) und Son Mi-jong (dance student) during the lighting of the 1988 Summer Olympic cauldron

Personal information
- Born: July 21, 1964 (age 62)

Sport
- Sport: Marathon running
Medal record
Representing South Korea
Asian Games
Gold medal – first place	1990 Beijing	Marathon

Kim Won-Tak (born July 21, 1964) is a South Korean long-distance runner who competed in the late 1980s.

== Biography ==
He is best known for his role at the opening ceremony of the 1988 Summer Olympics in Seoul, when he shared the lighting of the Olympic Flame with fellow South Koreans Chung Sun-Man and Sohn Kee-Chung.

Kim also competed in those same games, finishing 18th in the men's marathon event.

== Achievements ==
Year	Competition	Venue	Position	Event	Notes
Representing South Korea
1988	Olympic Games	Seoul, South Korea	18th	Marathon	2:15:44
1991	World Championships	Tokyo, Japan	19th	Marathon	2:21:16

Olympic Games
Preceded by Robyn Perry	Final Olympic torchbearer 1988 Seoul; With: Chung Sun-Man & Sohn Kee-Chung	Succeeded by Michel Platini & François-Cyrille Grange
Preceded by Rafer Johnson	Final Summer Olympic torchbearer 1988 Seoul; With: Chung Sun-Man & Sohn Kee-Chung	Succeeded by Antonio Rebollo
