= François-Cyrille Grange =

French alpine skier (born 1983)

François-Cyrille Grange (born 1983) is a French alpine skier who competed in the early 2000s.

== Biography ==
He was known for colighting the Olympic Flame with Michel Platini at the 1992 Winter Olympics in Albertville.

Grange's only alpine skiing event was in France in 2000 where he finished 21st in the giant slalom and 40th in the slalom events.

His younger brother is World Champion Jean-Baptiste Grange.

Olympic Games
Preceded by Chung Sun-Man, Sohn Mi-Chung, & Kim Won-Tak	Final Olympic torchbearer Albertville 1992; With: Michel Platini	Succeeded by Antonio Rebollo
Preceded by Robyn Perry	Final Winter Olympic torchbearer Albertville 1992; With: Michel Platini	Succeeded by Haakon Magnus, Crown Prince of Norway
