= Antonio Rebollo =

Spanish Paralympic archer (born 1955)

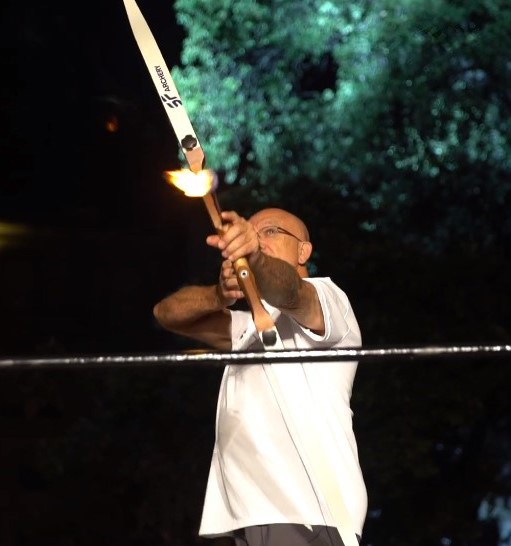
- Rebollo in 2017

Personal information
- Nationality: Spanish
- Born: Antonio Rebollo Liñán; 19 June 1955 (age 71) Madrid, Spain
Medal record
Men's para-archery
Representing Spain
Paralympic Games
Silver medal – second place	1984 Stoke Mandeville	Men's double FITA round integrated
Bronze medal – third place	1988 Seoul	Men's double FITA round open
Silver medal – second place	1992 Barcelona	Men's teams open

Antonio Rebollo Liñán (born 19 June 1955) is a Spanish Paralympic archer. During the opening ceremony of the 1992 Summer Olympics in Barcelona, he lit the Olympic Cauldron by shooting a flaming arrow over it, igniting the gases.

== Life and career ==
When Rebollo was eight months old, he contracted polio with both legs affected, the right one severely. He competed in archery, representing Spain at the 1984, 1988, and 1992 Summer Paralympics. He won a silver in 1984, bronze in 1988, and a second silver in 1992.

The opening ceremony of the 1992 Barcelona Olympics featured the Olympic Flame being ignited from afar by a flaming arrow. Rebollo was one of 200 archers considered for the position of firing the arrow. There were sunrise practices, along with wind machines to simulate various weather conditions, and flaming arrows that would often singe fingers. He was among four finalists, and was chosen two hours before the event.

There were no fears. I was practically a robot. I focused on my positioning and reaching the target. My feelings were taken from the people who described to me how they saw it. What they felt, their emotions, their cries. This is what made me realise what the moment actually meant.

— Antonio Rebollo, in a segment with NBC about the lighting of the cauldron during the opening ceremony of the 1992 Summer Olympics.

Olympic Games
Preceded by Michel Platini & François-Cyrille Grange	Final Olympic torchbearer Barcelona 1992	Succeeded by Haakon, Crown Prince of Norway
Preceded by Chung Sun-Man, Sohn Mi-Chung, & Kim Won-Tak	Final Summer Olympic torchbearer Barcelona 1992	Succeeded by Muhammad Ali
Preceded by Luc Sabatier	Final Paralympic Torchbearer; Barcelona 1992; With: Coral Bistuer	Succeeded by Helge Bjørnstad
Preceded by Lee Jae-oon & Kiifi Hyun-mi	Final Summer Paralympic Torchbearer; Barcelona 1992; With: Coral Bistuer	Succeeded by Mark Wellman
