= Hans Wikne =

Swedish equestrian (1914–1996)

Hans Wikne (11 September 1914 – 17 October 1996) was a Swedish equestrian rider who competed in the 1950s and 1960s. At the 1964 Summer Olympics in Tokyo, he finished fifth in the team dressage and 11th in the individual dressage events.

Eight years earlier, Wikne lit the Olympic Flame when the equestrian events were held in Stockholm in lieu of Australia's strict horse quarantine laws which prevented the competitions from taking place in host city Melbourne.

Olympic Games
Preceded by Guido Caroli	Final Olympic torchbearer Melbourne 1956; With: Ron Clarke	Succeeded by Ken Henry
Preceded by Paavo Nurmi and Hannes Kolehmainen	Final Summer Olympic torchbearer Melbourne 1956; With: Ron Clarke	Succeeded by Giancarlo Peris
