= John Mark (athlete) =

British sprinter (1925–1991)

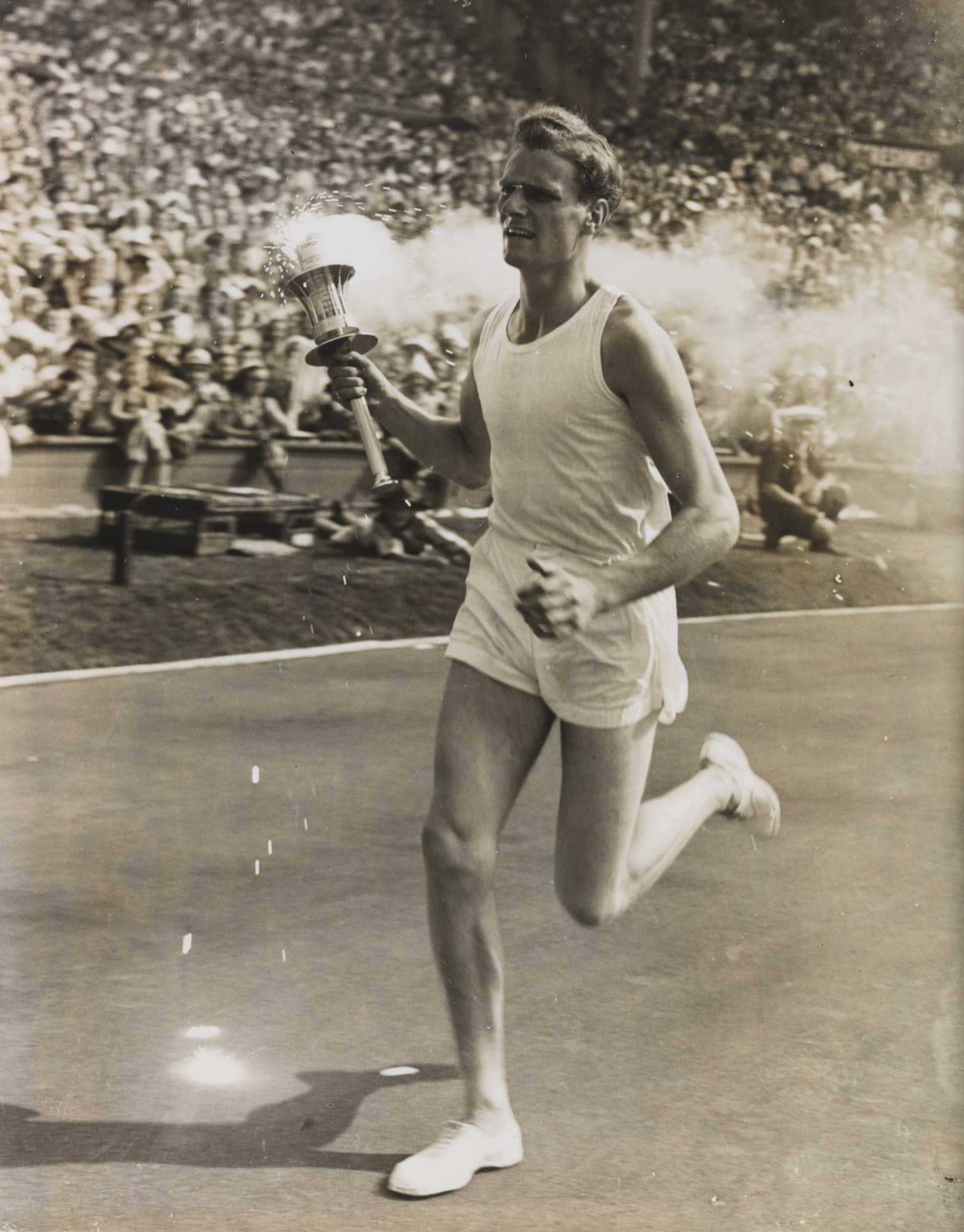
John Mark, Olympic torch bearer, London, 1948

John Mark (16 August 1925 – 8 December 1991) was a British track and field sprinter, best known for lighting the Olympic flame at the 1948 Summer Olympics in London.

== Biography ==
John Mark was educated at Cranleigh School, where he excelled at athletics, and won a place to study pre-medicine at Jesus College, Cambridge. Whilst at Cambridge he was a noted athlete and rugby forward, although he missed out on achieving his Blue due to injury. He served as president of the Cambridge University Athletic Club.

In 1947 Mark finished fourth in the AAA 440 yards and was selected to represent the United Kingdom in the 400 metres in Paris. He also won two AAA silver medals in the relay.

In late 1947, he was already on the British shortlist for selection for the 400 metres at the forthcoming London Olympics, when his Olympian good looks led to his being chosen to light the Olympic flame at the opening of the games. Thus on 29 July 1948 he carried the heavy Olympic torch on the final leg of its journey into Wembley Stadium and lit the flame in its specially designed bowl.

Already a medical student at St Mary's Hospital, Paddington, when the Olympics took place, Mark subsequently became a surgeon-lieutenant in the Royal Navy and then worked as a GP in a rural practice in Liss in Hampshire until his retirement. He died of a stroke following a holiday in the USA in 1991.

Olympic Games
Preceded by Fritz Schilgen	Final Olympic torchbearer London 1948	Succeeded by Eigil Nansen
Preceded by Fritz Schilgen	Final Summer Olympic torchbearer London 1948	Succeeded by Paavo Nurmi and Hannes Kolehmainen
