= Ron Clarke =

Australian long-distance runner (1937–2015)

Ron Clarke AO MBE
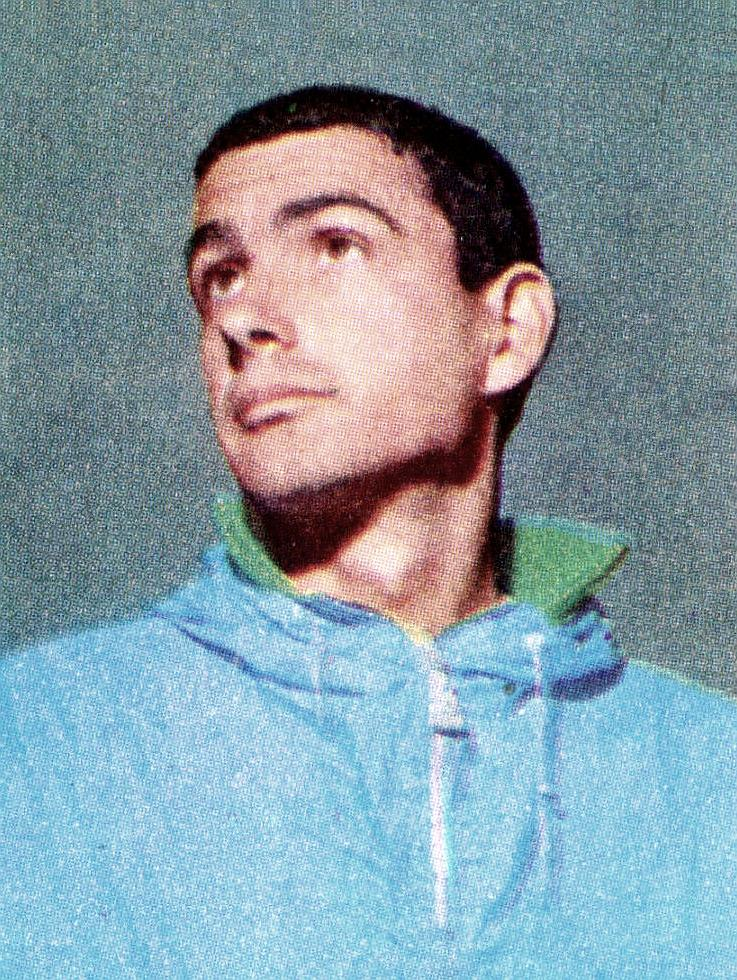
- Clarke circa 1967

Mayor of the Gold Coast
- In office 25 March 2004 – 27 February 2012
- Deputy: Daphne McDonald
- Preceded by: Gary Baildon
- Succeeded by: Tom Tate

Personal details
- Born: Ronald William Clarke; 21 February 1937 Melbourne, Victoria, Australia
- Died: 17 June 2015 (aged 78) Southport, Queensland, Australia
- Party: Independent
- Spouse: Helen Clarke
- Occupation: Athlete
- Sports career
- Height: 183 cm (6 ft 0 in)
- Weight: 72 kg (159 lb)
- Sport: Athletics
- Events: 5,000, 10,000 m, marathon
- Club: Glenhuntly Athletics Club

Sports achievements and titles
- Personal bests: 5,000 m – 13:16.6 (1966); 10,000 m – 27:39.89 (1965); Marathon – 2:20:26 (1964)
Medal record
Men's athletics
Representing Australia
Olympic Games
Bronze medal – third place	1964 Tokyo	10,000 metres
Commonwealth Games
Silver medal – second place	1962 Perth	3 miles
Silver medal – second place	1966 Kingston	3 miles
Silver medal – second place	1966 Kingston	6 miles
Silver medal – second place	1970 Edinburgh	10,000 metres

Ronald William Clarke (21 February 1937 – 17 June 2015) was an Australian athlete, writer, and the Mayor of the Gold Coast from 2004 to 2012. He was one of the best-known middle- and long-distance runners in the 1960s, notable for setting seventeen world records.

== Early life and family ==
Clarke was born 21 February 1937 in Melbourne, Victoria. He attended Essendon Primary School, Essendon High School (now part of Essendon Keilor College) and Melbourne High School. His brother Jack Clarke and father Tom played Australian rules football in the Victorian Football League with Essendon. He was a qualified accountant.

In 1956, when Clarke was still a promising 19-year-old, he was chosen to light the Olympic Flame in the Melbourne Cricket Ground during the opening ceremonies of the 1956 Summer Olympics in Melbourne.

== Athletic career ==
During the 1960s, Clarke won 9 Australian championships and 12 Victorian track championships ranging from 1500 m to 6 miles (9.7 km).

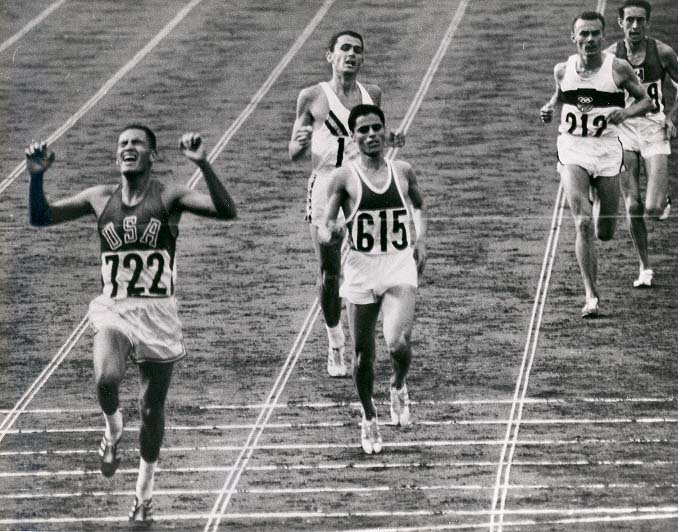
Ron Clarke (in third place and second from left behind #615) at the 1964 Summer Olympics. At the fore are Billy Mills (722) and Mohammed Gammoudi (615).

He won the bronze medal in the 10,000 metre (m) race at the 1964 Summer Olympics when he was upset by Billy Mills, and never won an Olympic gold medal. However, Emil Zátopek gave him one of his own gold medals, which Clarke described as one of his most cherished presents. At the 1968 Summer Olympics in Mexico City, Clarke collapsed and nearly died from altitude sickness sustained during the gruelling 10,000 m race final. Despite training in the Alps to get acclimatised to high altitudes at Mexico City, this could not put him on par with many opponents from Africa, who had always run at high altitude (with the notable exception of 5,000 m gold medalist and 10,000 m bronze medalist Mohammed Gammoudi of Tunisia, who was born and lived not far above sea level). Clarke finished in sixth place, but remembered nothing of the last lap. He recovered sufficiently to compete in the 5,000 metre heats a few days later.

In the 1962 British Empire and Commonwealth Games, he won silver in the 3-mile event, and in the 1966 Games he won silver medals in the 3 miles (4.8 km) and 6 miles (9.7 km) events.

During a 44-day European tour in 1965, he competed 18 times and broke 12 world records, including the 20,000 m (12.4 miles). On 10 July, at London's White City Stadium, during the 1965 AAA Championships, he became the first man to run 3 miles in under 13 minutes, lowering the world record to 12:52.4. Four days later, in Oslo, he lowered his own 10,000 m world record by 36.2 seconds to 27:39.4, becoming the first man to break the 28 minute barrier. Clarke went on to win the British AAA title again in 1966 and 1967.

=== World records ===
Distance	Time / distance	Location	Date	Note
5000 m	13:34.8	Hobart, Australia	1965-01-16	
5000 m	13:33.6	Auckland, New Zealand	1965-02-01	
5000 m	13:25.8	Los Angeles, United States	1965-06-04	
5000 m	13:16.6	Stockholm, Sweden	1966-07-05	
10,000 m	28:15.6	Melbourne, Australia	1963-12-18	
10,000 m	27:39.4	Oslo, Norway	1965-07-14	
20,000 m	59:22.8	Geelong, Australia	1965-10-27	As part of 1-hour world record.
1 hour	20,232 m	Geelong, Australia	1965-10-27	
2 miles	8:19.8	Västerås, Sweden	1967-07-27	
2 miles	8:19.6	London, England	1968-08-24	
3 miles	13:07.6	Melbourne, Australia	1964-12-03	
3 miles	13:00.4	Los Angeles, United States	1965-06-04	As part of 5000 m world record.
3 miles	12:52.4	London, England	1965-07-10	
3 miles	12:50.4	Stockholm, Sweden	1966-07-05	As part of 5000 m world record.
6 miles	27:17.8	Melbourne, Australia	1963-12-18	
6 miles	26:47.0	Oslo, Norway	1965-07-14	As part of 10,000 m world record
10 miles	47:12.8	Melbourne, Australia	1965-03-04	

In 1965, Clarke beat the 10,000-metre world record in Turku, Finland, with a time of 28:14.0; however, it was never ratified, as it was said that permission to run was requested too late.

== Political career ==
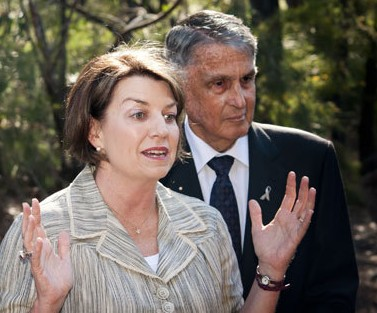
Clarke (right) with Queensland premier Anna Bligh at the sod-turning event for Griffith University light rail station in 2010

Clarke was elected mayor of the Gold Coast in 2004, defeating incumbent Gary Baildon. Clarke and his wife, Helen, first came to the Gold Coast for a holiday in 1957. The couple returned almost every year thereafter, and in 1995, after 14 years abroad, mainly in Europe, came back for good. He was re-elected in 2008.

Clarke resigned as Mayor of the Gold Coast on 27 February 2012, when he announced his nomination to run as an independent candidate for the seat of Broadwater in the 2012 Queensland state election. Clarke failed in this campaign, coming fourth and recording only a 4.6% primary vote.

Former Australian Football League CEO Andrew Demetriou stated that Clarke as Mayor of the Gold Coast played a major role in the AFL establishing a new team Gold Coast Suns on the Gold Coast.

In 2011, Clarke was part of the lobbying team that secured the 2018 Commonwealth Games for the Gold Coast, Queensland.

== Business career ==
Clarke notably co-founded the Lifestyle fitness club in 1974 with footballer Terry Moore, and it soon became the largest chain of commercial gymnasiums in Australia.

== Honours ==
In 1966, Clarke was appointed a Member of the Order of the British Empire (MBE) "In recognition of service to athletics".

In 2000, he was awarded the Australian Sports Medal for "Significant contribution as a competitor (Athletics)".

In 2001, he was awarded the Centenary Medal for "Distinguished service to the eco-tourism industry".

In the 2013 Queen's Birthday Honours List, he was appointed an Officer of the Order of Australia (AO) "for distinguished service to the community through a range of leadership roles with local government and philanthropic organisations, and to the promotion of athletics."

== Awards and recognition ==
- 1965 – awarded the Prix Du President by the French Sports Academy
- 1965 – Helms Award for Australasia
- 1965 – ABC's Sportsman of the Year
- 1965 – Track & Field News Male Athlete of the Year
- 1965 – BBC Sportsman of the Year – Overseas Personality
- 1965 – World Sportsman of the Year by the International Association of Sports Writers
- 1982 – awarded Victorian Father of the Year.
- 1985 – inaugural inductee into the Sport Australia Hall of Fame
- 2000 – inaugural inductee into the Athletics Australia Hall of Fame in 2000.
- 2022 - Sport Australia Hall of Fame Legend

In 2005, Geelong Athletics honoured Clarke with an athletics meet to commemorate the 40th anniversary of his breaking the world record for the 20,000 metres and his one-hour run at Landy Field in October 1965. This meet is held annually as part of the Athletics Australia National Meet Series.

On 15 March 2006, Ron Clarke was one of the final four runners who carried the Queen's Baton around the MCG stadium during the 2006 Commonwealth Games Opening Ceremony in Melbourne, Victoria, Australia.

Emil Zátopek had great respect for Ron Clarke. In 1966 (often erroneously noted as 1968), he invited the Australian to Czechoslovakia, and as a parting gift he gave him his 1952 Olympic 10,000-metre gold medal with the following words: "Not out of friendship but because you deserve it."

== Death ==
Clarke died of kidney failure on 17 June 2015 at Allamanda Hospital in Southport, Queensland. Clarke is survived by his wife Helen and sons Marcus and Nicolas. His daughter Monique died of breast cancer in 2009.

Prime Minister Tony Abbott and Opposition Leader Bill Shorten paid tribute to Clarke in Parliament on the day of his death by stating that a great Australian had been lost with his death. Herb Elliott, an Australian 1500-metre Olympic gold medallist, said "Ron was a great man. His contribution to athletics was enormous. He was also a wonderful contributor to public health through lifestyle programs and gymnasiums and the communities in which he lived. Ron will be greatly missed".

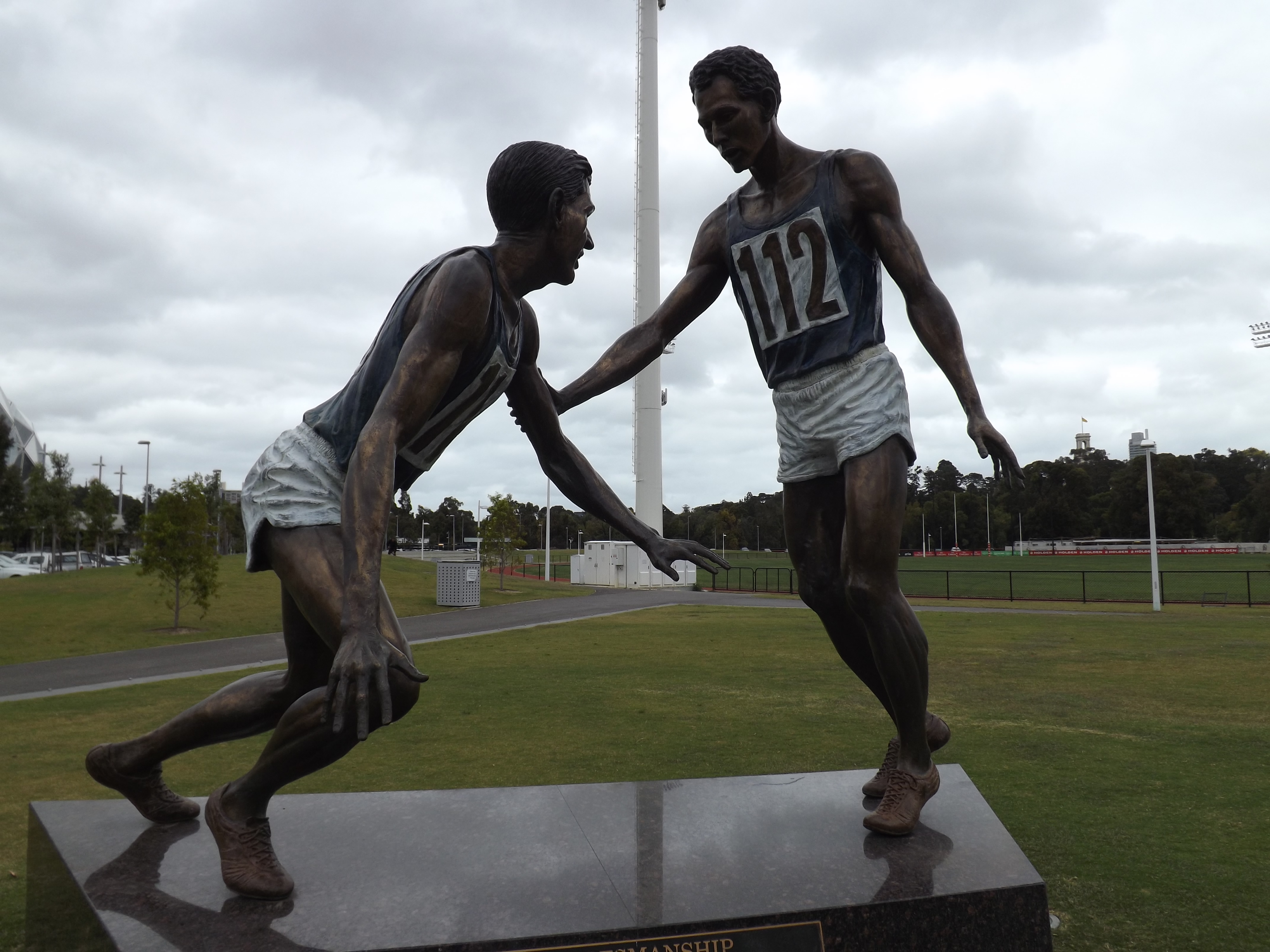
Mitch Mitchell's sculpture depicting Clarke and Landy

John Landy, who famously helped Clarke when he fell during a mile race at the 1956 Australian Championships, said, "Ron Clarke, by his running feats inspired Australian distance runners and in a world sense, demonstrated the potential athletics achievements possible." Frank Shorter, the 1972 Olympic marathon gold medallist, said: "Ron Clarke was my idol. I grew up seeing Ron Clarke in the dark blue singlet with the V on it – to me that was the symbol of running."

== Bibliography ==
- The Measure of Success : a personal perspective. South Melbourne, Vic. : Lothian Books, 2004.
- Run Easy. Melbourne : Information Australia, 2001.
- Never Say Never : Couran Cove Resort from dream to reality. Avalon, N.S.W. : Banyan Tree Creative Services, 1999.
- Fixing the Olympics. Melbourne : Information Australia, 1999.
- Enjoying Life : a champion's guide to the good life. Melbourne : Information Australia, 1999.
- Total Living : for everyone who wants to be fitter, trimmer and smarter. London : Pavilion, 1995.
- Ron Clarke's Running Book. Collingwood, Vic. : Outback Press, 1979.
- Successful Athletics : from beginner to expert in forty lessons, with Raelene Boyle. Melbourne : Thomas Nelson, 1976.
- Ron Clarke Talks Track edited by Jon Hendershott. Los Altos, California : Tafnews, 1972.
- Athletics the Australian Way. Melbourne : Lansdowne, 1971.
- The Lonely Breed, with Norman Harris. London : Pelham, 1967.
- The Unforgiving Minute, as told to Alan Trengrove. London : Pelham, 1966.

== See also ==
- Olympic medalists in athletics
- Mayor of the Gold Coast

Records
Preceded by (Soviet Union) Pyotr Bolotnikov	Men's 10,000 m World Record Holder; 18 December 1963 – 3 September 1972	Succeeded by (Finland) Lasse Virén
Awards and achievements
Preceded by (New Zealand) Peter Snell	Track & Field Athlete of the Year; 1965	Succeeded by (United States) Jim Ryun
Sporting positions
Preceded by (Kenya) Kipchoge Keino	Men's 5000 m Best Year Performance; 1966–1968	Succeeded by (New Zealand) Dick Taylor
Olympic Games
Preceded by Guido Caroli	Final Olympic torchbearer Melbourne 1956; With: Hans Wikne	Succeeded by Ken Henry
Preceded by Paavo Nurmi and Hannes Kolehmainen	Final Summer Olympic torchbearer Melbourne 1956; With: Hans Wikne	Succeeded by Giancarlo Peris
Political offices
Preceded by Gary Baildon	Mayor of the Gold Coast; 2004–2012	Succeeded by Tom Tate
