= Guido Caroli =

Italian speed skater (1927–2021)

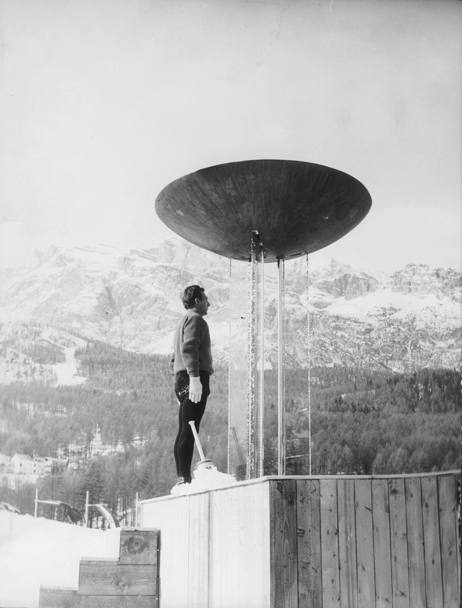

Guido Caroli (9 May 1927 – 8 September 2021) was an Italian speed skater who competed from the late 1940s to the mid-1950s. He is best known for falling with the Olympic flame, which he lit at the 1956 Winter Olympics in Cortina d'Ampezzo. Caroli also competed in three Winter Olympics, earning his best finish of 28th in the 10,000 m event at Oslo in 1952. He died on 8 September 2021, at the age of 94.

Olympic Games
Preceded by Paavo Nurmi and Hannes Kolehmainen	Final Olympic torchbearer Cortina d'Ampezzo 1956	Succeeded by Ron Clarke & Hans Wikne
Preceded by Eigil Nansen	Final Winter Olympic torchbearer Cortina d'Ampezzo 1956	Succeeded by Ken Henry
