= Robyn Perry =

Canadian figure skater (born 1975)

Robyn Ainsworth (born Robyn Perry in 1975) is a former figure skater who lit the Olympic Flame, as a 12-year-old schoolgirl, in the opening ceremony for the 1988 Winter Olympics.

== Biography ==
On February 13, 1988, she was the final runner in the Olympic torch relay and was chosen to ignite the giant cauldron at McMahon Stadium, kicking off the Calgary Winter Olympics. Downhill skier Ken Read and speed skater Cathy Priestner handed off the torch to her. During the ascent, Perry had to yell to one of the athletes to get out of her way.

In an interview with the 2010 Winter Olympics website, Perry stated that she had many amazing experiences because of this. Perry now directs We Care Home Health Services in North Calgary.

Olympic Games
Preceded by Rafer Johnson	Final Olympic torchbearer Calgary 1988	Succeeded by Chung Sun-Man, Sohn Mi-Chung, & Kim Won-Tak
Preceded by Sanda Dubravčić	Final Winter Olympic torchbearer Calgary 1988	Succeeded by Michel Platini & François-Cyrille Grange
