= Hannes Kolehmainen =

Finnish long-distance runner

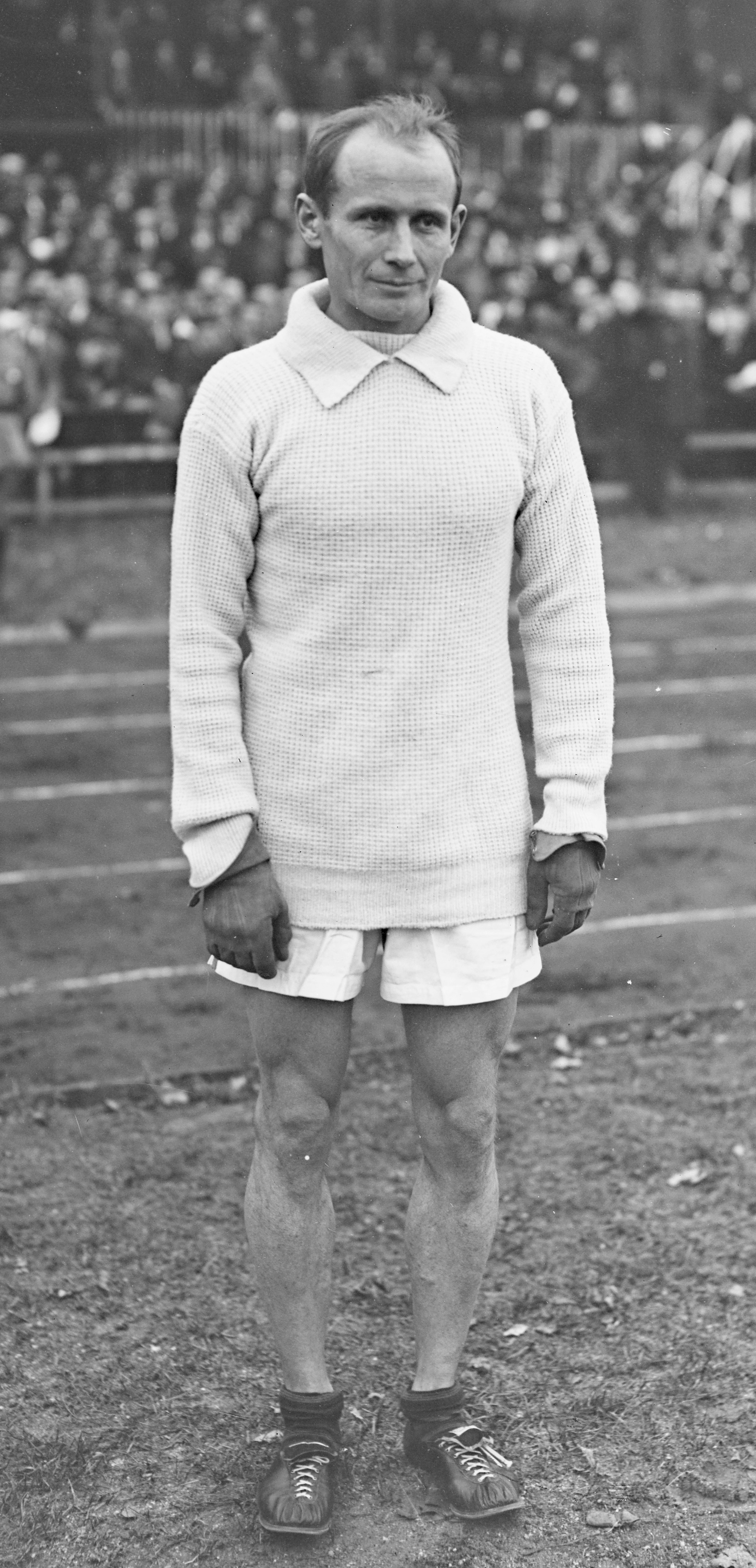
- Kolehmainen in 1920

Personal information
- Born: 9 December 1889 Kuopio, Grand Duchy of Finland, Russian Empire (present-day Finland)
- Died: 11 January 1966 (aged 76) Helsinki, Finland
- Height: 1.68 m (5 ft 6 in)
- Weight: 57 kg (126 lb)

Sport
- Sport: Running
- Club: Helsingin Jyry; FAAC, New York
Medal record
Representing Finland
Olympic Games
Gold medal – first place	1912 Stockholm	5000 metres
Gold medal – first place	1912 Stockholm	10000 metres
Gold medal – first place	1912 Stockholm	Individual cross country
Gold medal – first place	1920 Antwerp	Marathon
Silver medal – second place	1912 Stockholm	Team cross country

Juho Pietari "Hannes" Kolehmainen (Finnish: [ˈhɑnːes ˈkolehmɑi̯nen]; 9 December 1889 – 11 January 1966) was a Finnish four-time Olympic gold medalist and a world record holder in middle- and long-distance running. He was the first in a generation of great Finnish long-distance runners, often named the "Flying Finns". Kolehmainen competed for a number of years in the United States, wearing the Winged Fist of the Irish American Athletic Club. He also enlisted in the 14th Regiment of the National Guard of New York, and became a U.S. citizen in 1921.

== Biography ==
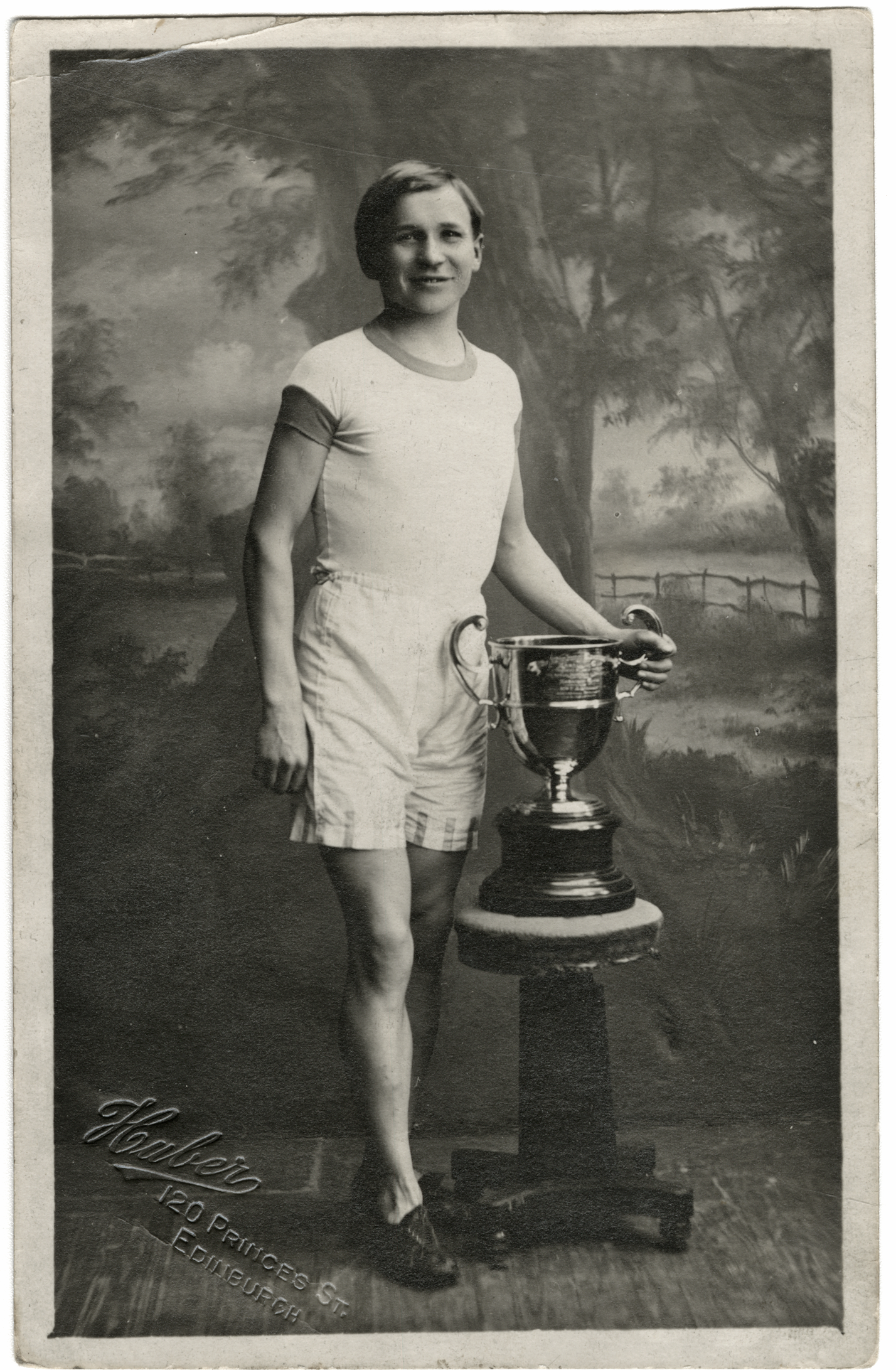
Portrait of Hannes Kolehmainen, [ca. 1912]

Kolehmainen a bricklayer by trade, was from a sportive family from Kuopio – his brothers William and Tatu were also strong long-distance runners.

Kolehmainen won the 1911 British AAA Championships 4 miles title at the 1911 AAA Championships.

Hannes was one of the stars of the 1912 Summer Olympics in Stockholm, winning three gold medals. His most memorable was the one in the 5000 m. In that event, he ran a heroic duel with Frenchman Jean Bouin. After leading the field together for most of the race, Bouin was only defeated by Kolehmainen in the final metres, in world record time. In addition, Kolehmainen won the 10,000 m and the now-discontinued cross country event. With the Finnish team, he also obtained a silver place in the cross country team event.

Kolehmainen's sportive career was interrupted by the First World War, but he remained an athlete to be reckoned with, although his specialty had now shifted to the longer distances, especially the marathon. At the first post-war Olympics in Antwerp, he won the gold medal in this event. He would also enter the Olympic marathon in 1924, but did not complete that race.

By then, Kolehmainen had found a worthy successor in Paavo Nurmi. Together with Nurmi, as the final link in the torch relay, he lit the Olympic Flame at the 1952 Summer Olympics in Helsinki. He died in that same city, fourteen years later.

== Personal life ==
Kolehmainen was reported by journalists to be a vegetarian whilst training. However, his actual diet consisted of fish, eggs, ice cream, oatmeal, toast and tea.

Records
Preceded by Jean Bouin	Men's 3,000 m World Record Holder; 24 September 1911 – 24 May 1912	Succeeded by Bror Fock
Preceded by Bror Fock	Men's 3,000 m World Record Holder; 12 July 1912 – 15 July 1918	Succeeded by John Zander
Preceded by Alfred Shrubb	Men's 5,000 m World Record Holder; 10 June 1912 – 12 September 1922	Succeeded by Paavo Nurmi
Preceded by (Sweden) Alexis Ahlgren	Men's Marathon World Record Holder; 22 August 1920 – 12 October 1925	Succeeded by (United States) Albert Michelsen
Olympic Games
Preceded by Eigil Nansen	Final Olympic torchbearer Helsinki 1952; With: Paavo Nurmi	Succeeded by Guido Caroli
Preceded by John Mark	Final Summer Olympic torchbearer Helsinki 1952; With: Paavo Nurmi	Succeeded by Ron Clarke & Hans Wikne
