= Mark Wellman =

American paralegic climber

Mark Wellman is an author, filmmaker, paralympian, and motivational speaker, who is best known for his 1989 ascent of The Shield on El Capitan in Yosemite National Park, which was the first ascent of the famous cliff by a paraplegic. He has appeared on National television speaking about his ascent. He has written a biography, Climbing Back, as well as given many powerful speeches for himself and other paraplegics. Wellman lit the cauldron for the opening of the 1996 Summer Paralympics in Atlanta after carrying the flaming torch up a 120-foot rope.

== Ascent of El Capitan ==
7 years before the El Capitan ascent Wellman, then aged 21, lost the use of his legs when he fell 100 feet off a mountain in the Sierra Nevadas, injuring his spine. However, he became the first paraplegic to climb El Capitan, over the course of six days. While he climbed up the mountain, a friend named Mike Corbett accompanied him and supported his slips.

Olympic Games
| Preceded by Helge Bjørnstad | Final Paralympic Torchbearer; Atlanta 1996 | Succeeded by Naoya Maruyama |
| Preceded by Antonio Rebollo & Coral Bistuer | Final Summer Paralympic Torchbearer; Atlanta 1996 | Succeeded by Louise Sauvage |
