= Giancarlo Peris =

Italian track athlete

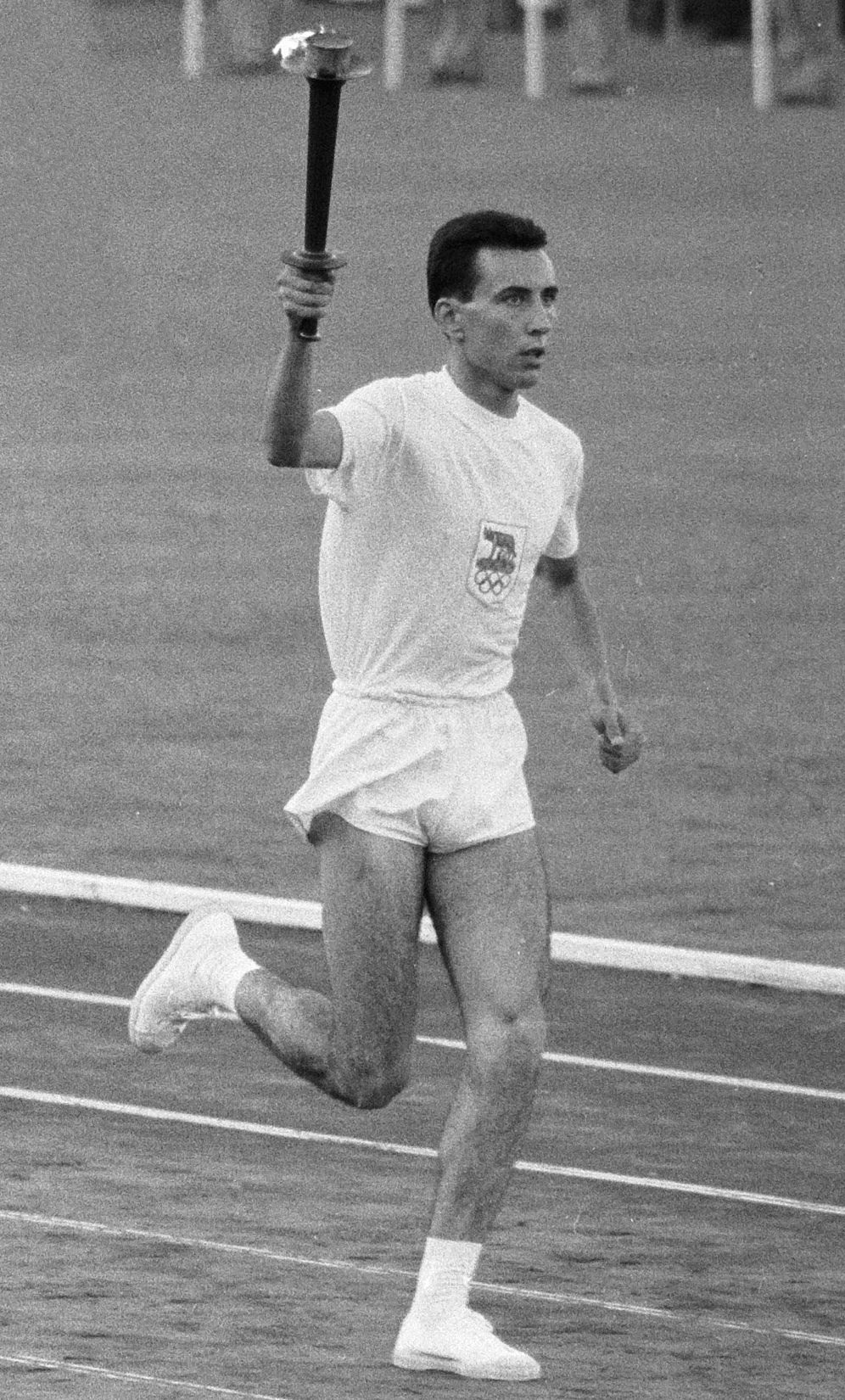
- Giancarlo Peris with the Olympic torch at the 1960 Summer Olympics opening ceremony

Personal information
- Nationality: Italian
- Born: 4 November 1941 (age 84) Civitavecchia, Kingdom of Italy

Sport
- Country: Italy
- Sport: Athletics
- Event: Cross country running

Giancarlo Peris (born 4 November 1941), is an Italian track athlete of Greek descent, was the final bearer of the Olympic torch for the 1960 Summer Olympics in Rome, Italy.

== Biography ==
Peris was born in Civitavecchia, a port city on the Tyrrhenian Sea 70 kilometers northwest of Rome. The Italian National Olympic Committee decided that the last torchbearer of the Olympic Games would be the winner of a junior Cross country running race. Peris won and was chosen to be the last torchbearer. Peris was also a promising track athlete and few months before the opening of the Olympic games he competed for his country's national junior/youth team against Poland.

He later became a teacher of history and Italian at the technical high-school "G. Baccelli" of Civitavecchia. He also coached at a small athletics club.

== See also ==
- 1960 Summer Olympics

Olympic Games
| Preceded by Ken Henry | Final Olympic torchbearer Rome 1960 | Succeeded by Josl Rieder |
| Preceded by Ron Clarke & Hans Wikne | Final Summer Olympic torchbearer Rome 1960 | Succeeded by Yoshinori Sakai |
