= Josl Rieder =

Austrian alpine skier (1932–2019)

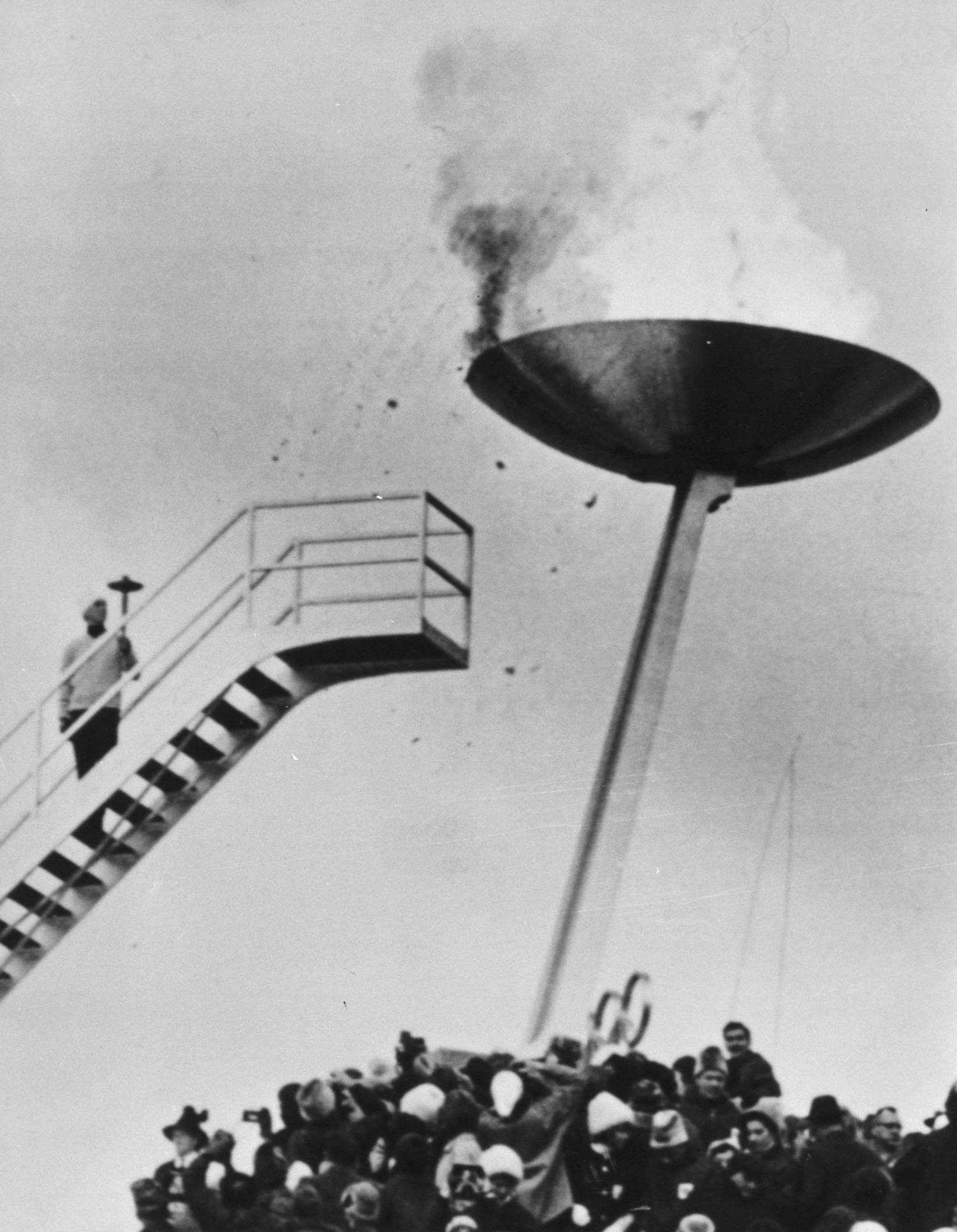
- Rieder lighting the Olympic cauldron in 1964

Personal information
- Born: 3 December 1932 Lermoos, Austria
- Died: 15 June 2019 (aged 86)
- Height: 162 cm (5 ft 4 in)
- Weight: 60 kg (132 lb)

Sport
- Sport: Alpine skiing
- Club: SC Lermoos
Medal record
Representing Austria
World Championships
Gold medal – first place	1958 Bad Gastein	Slalom
Silver medal – second place	1958 Bad Gastein	Giant slalom
Silver medal – second place	1958 Bad Gastein	Combination

Josef "Josl" Rieder (3 December 1932 – 15 June 2019) was an Austrian alpine skier. He competed at the 1956 Winter Olympics in Cortina d'Ampezzo, but was disqualified in the downhill event and failed to finish the slalom. He lit the Olympic Flame at the 1964 Winter Olympics in Innsbruck. At the FIS Alpine World Ski Championships 1958, he won three medals with a gold in slalom and silvers in the giant slalom and combination events.

Olympic Games
Preceded by Giancarlo Peris	Final Olympic torchbearer Innsbruck 1964	Succeeded by Yoshinori Sakai
Preceded by Ken Henry	Final Winter Olympic torchbearer Innsbruck 1964	Succeeded by Alain Calmat
