= Eigil Nansen =

Norwegian human rights activist (1931–2017)

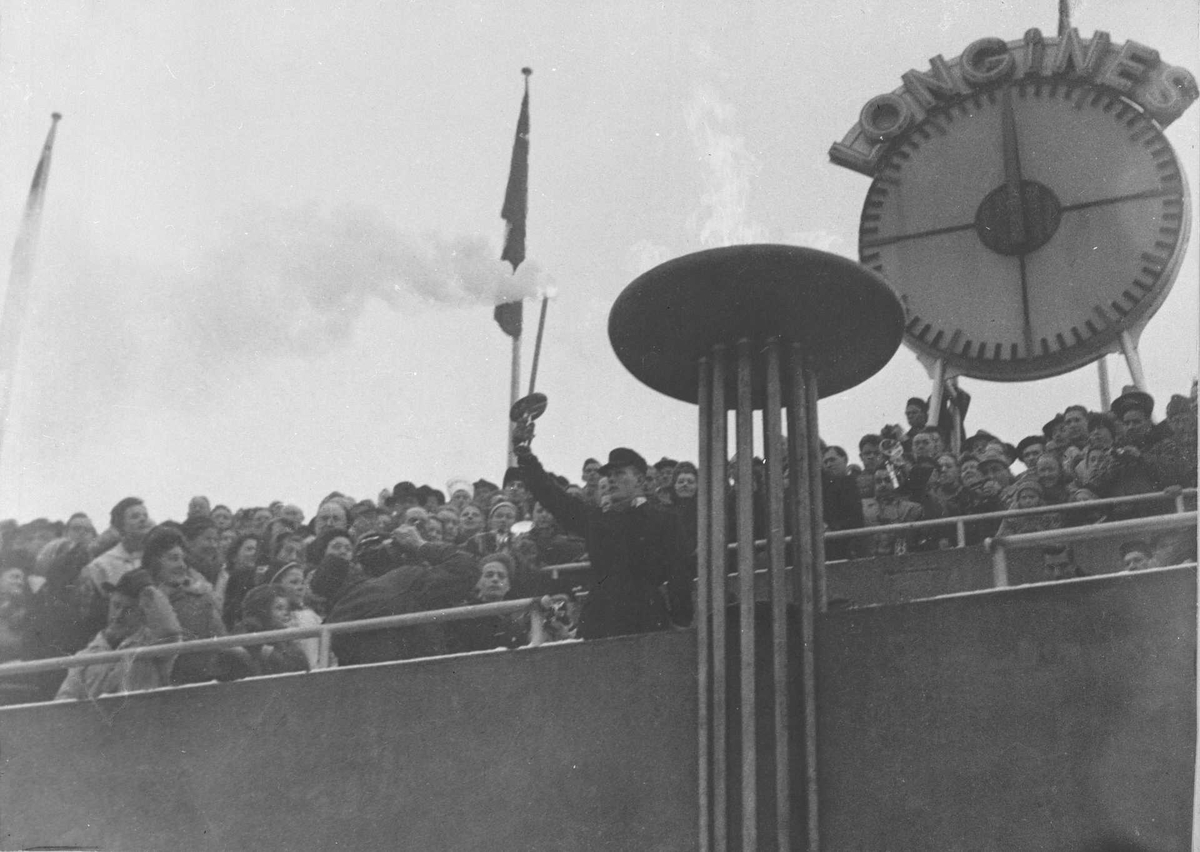
The opening ceremony of the 1952 Winter Olympics in Oslo. Eigil Nansen with the Olympic Torch.

Eigil Nansen (18 June 1931 – 27 February 2017) was the son of architect and humanist Odd Nansen and the grandson of explorer and humanist Fridtjof Nansen.

In 1991, he won The Lisl and Leo Eitinger Prize for his work with refugees and human rights. Nansen is also known for lighting the first Winter Olympic cauldron, in 1952.

Olympic Games
Preceded by John Mark	Final Olympic torchbearer Oslo 1952	Succeeded by Paavo Nurmi and Hannes Kolehmainen
Preceded by First Final Torchbearer	Final Winter Olympic torchbearer Oslo 1952	Succeeded by Guido Caroli
