= Ken Henry (speed skater) =

American speed skater (1929–2009)

Medal record

Men's speed skating

Representing the United States

Olympic Games
| Gold medal – first place | 1952 Oslo | 500 m |

Kenneth "Ken" Charles Henry (January 7, 1929 – March 1, 2009) was a speed skater from the United States.

== Biography ==
Henry won the gold medal in the 500 m at the 1952 Winter Olympics held in Oslo, Norway, in front of 28,000 people at Bislett Stadium in a time of 43.2 seconds. Two weeks later, he won the same title in the annual World Meet at Hamar, Norway. His 1952 Olympic gold medal time was one tenth of one second short of the record time set in 1948 by Finn Helgesen of Norway.

Henry competed in three Olympics. In 1948, he came fifth in the 500 metre event at the Winter Olympics of St. Moritz, Switzerland. The 1956 Winter Olympics were the third for the American in the 500 m event in Cortina d'Ampezzo, Italy. In between, Henry finished fourth overall in both the 1949 and 1950 World Allround Championships.

Henry has always lived in the Chicago area. He began skating when he was nine years old near Edison Park in Chicago. He later starred at Taft High School.

He won the Chicago Tribune-sponsored Silver Skates titles in 1946 and 1947, as well as the Intermediate National and North American Outdoor Championships when he was seventeen years of age.

At Northern Illinois University, he majored in physical education, and played on the golf team. He graduated in 1955. Henry became the golf club professional at Glen Flora Country Club in Waukegan, Illinois in 1955, a position he held until 1994. Henry lived in Lake Bluff, Illinois for most of his adult life.

At the 1960 Winter Olympics in Squaw Valley, California, Henry was chosen to light the final torch at the opening ceremony. These were the first televised Olympics, and the outdoor ceremony was produced by Walt Disney. In Lausanne, Switzerland, where the International Olympic Committee has its headquarters, there is an exhibit displaying all the torches from each of the Olympic opening ceremonies. Henry is listed as the final torch bearer, along with some background information on the travel of the 1960 torch itself.

Henry served as a coach on the American men's and women's Olympic speed skating team in the late 1960s and early 1970s.

In 2001, Henry was inducted into the Chicagoland Sports Hall of Fame.

Olympic Games
| Preceded by Ron Clarke and Hans Wikne | Final Olympic torchbearer Squaw Valley 1960 | Succeeded by Giancarlo Peris |
| Preceded by Guido Caroli | Final Winter Olympic torchbearer Squaw Valley 1960 | Succeeded by Josl Rieder |
