= 1952 Summer Olympics torch relay =

- Host city: Helsinki, Finland
- Countries visited: Greece, Germany, Denmark, Sweden, Finland
- Distance: 7,492 kilometres (4,655 mi)
- Torchbearers: 3,042
- Start date: 25 June 1952
- End date: 19 July 1952
- Torch designer: Aukusti Tuhka
- No. of torches: 22

The 1952 Summer Olympics torch relay was the symbolic transport of the Olympic flame from Olympia, Greece, to the venue of the 1952 Summer Olympics in Helsinki, Finland, where it featured as part of the opening ceremony.

== Relay elements ==
=== Flame ===
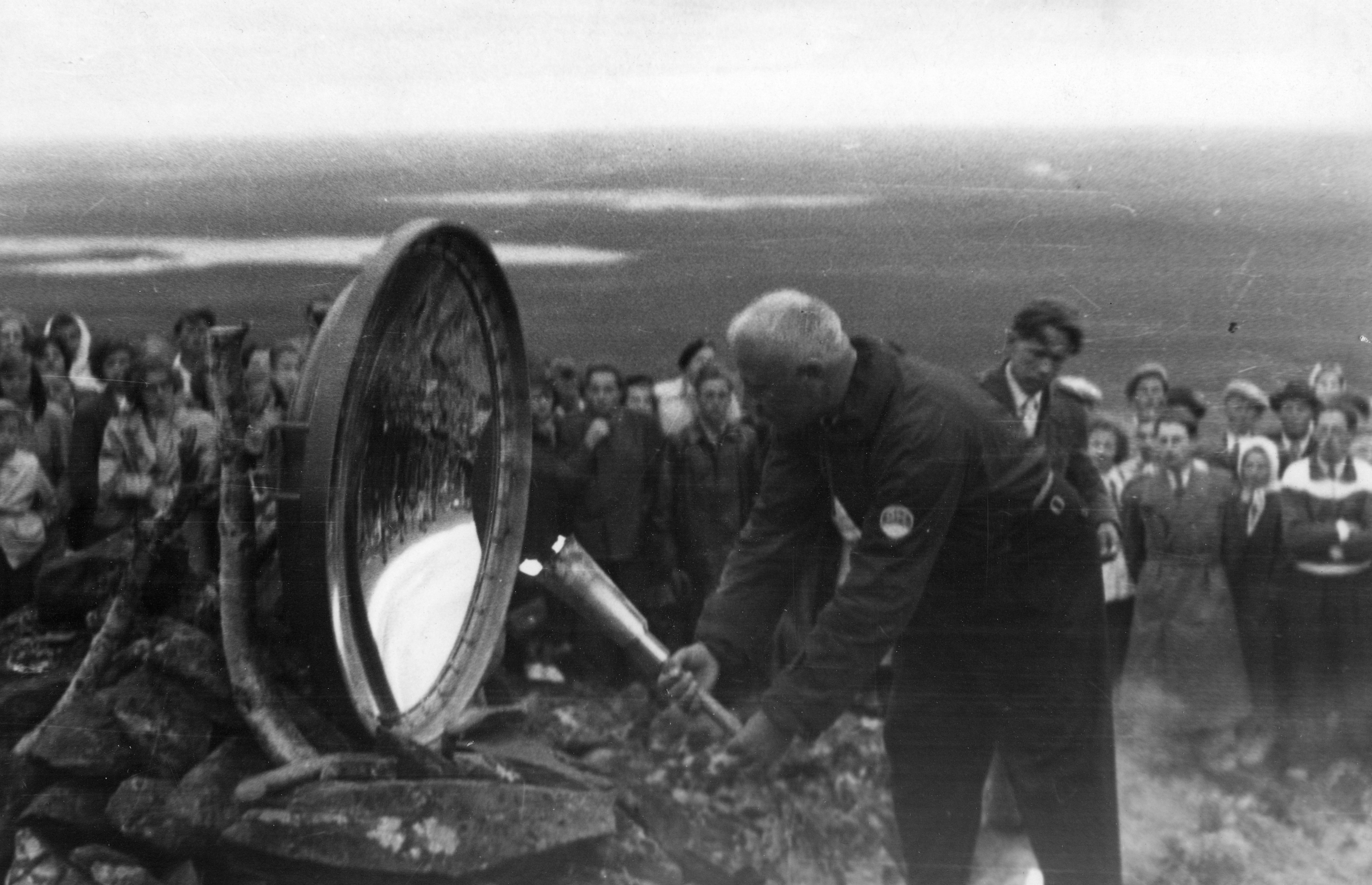
The Midnight Sun Torch being lit on top of Pallastunturi

The 1952 Olympic flame was lit at a ceremony using the sun's rays in Olympia, from where it started its journey on 25 June.

On 6 July, a second flame was lit on top of the Taivaskero peak of Pallastunturi fell in the Finnish Lapland. The intention had been to ignite it with the rays of the midnight sun, but due to overcast conditions that night some additional 'tricks' were required.

This 'Midnight Sun Torch' was carried 378 kilometres (235 mi) south to the city of Tornio near the Swedish border, where it met the one from Olympia, the latter having meanwhile been carried north the length of Sweden. The two flames were merged for the remainder of their journey.

=== Torch ===
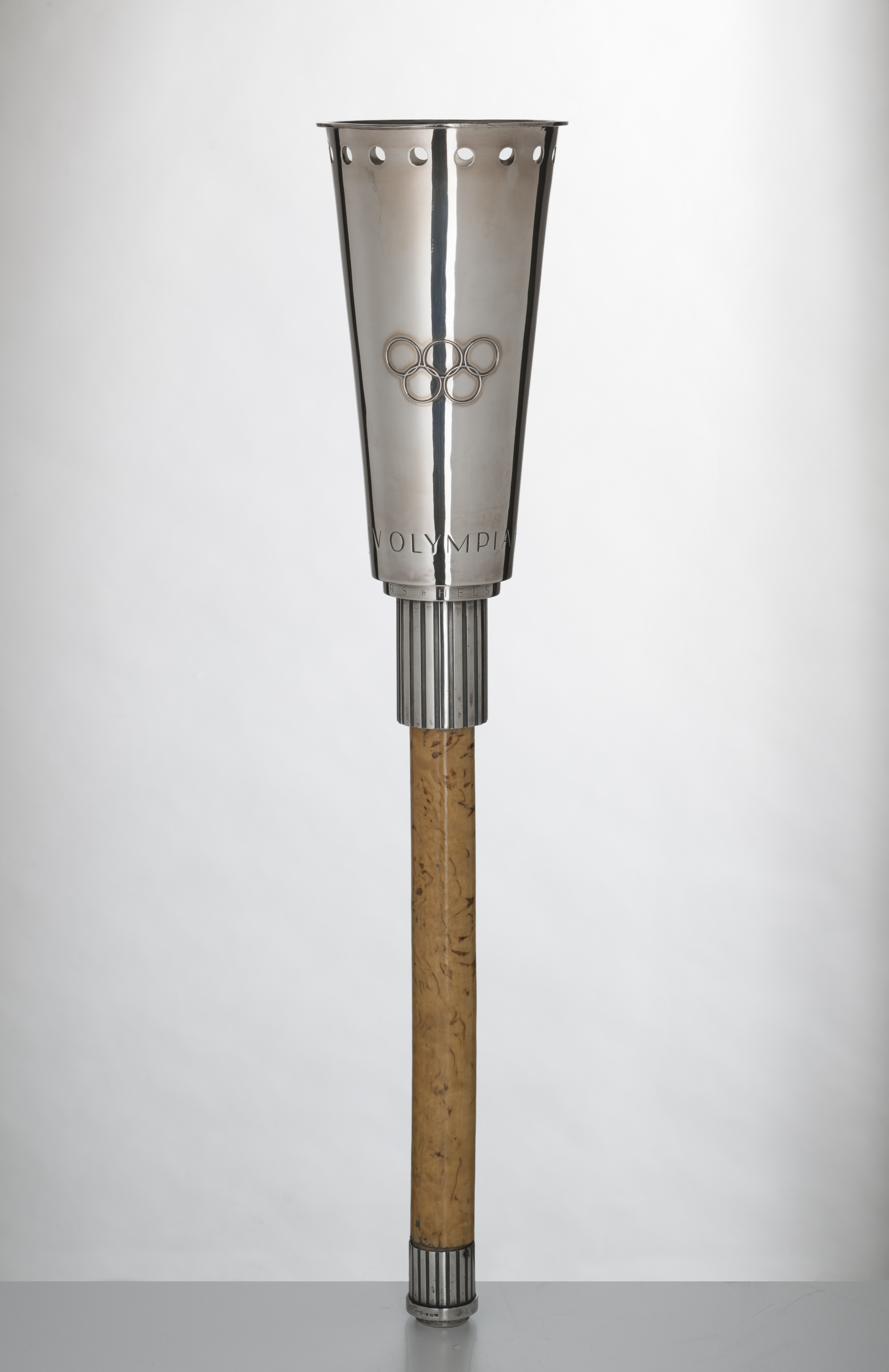
1952 Summer Olympics torch

The torches were made of either solid silver or silver-plated brass, with a lacquered curly birch handle.

The fuel was liquid gas contained in a cartridge which was quick and easy to replace. For this reason, only 22 torches were needed, as well as 1,600 fuel cartridges.

Because of the small number produced, the 1952 torch is a rarity not found in many collections, and therefore highly collectable: at a 2011 auction in Paris, one was sold for the record price of €290,000 or nearly US$400,000.

The torch was designed by Finnish graphic designer and visual artist Aukusti Tuhka and manufactured by the precious metals company Kultakeskus.

=== Route ===
The flame was carried from Olympia to Athens, from where it was flown to Aalborg, Denmark, via two intermediary stops in West Germany (in Munich and Düsseldorf). There were celebrations held at each stop of the journey. This was the first time the Olympic flame was flown out of Greece.

Next, the flame traversed Denmark over land and water by different modes of transport, finishing with crossing the Øresund strait from Copenhagen to Malmö, Sweden.

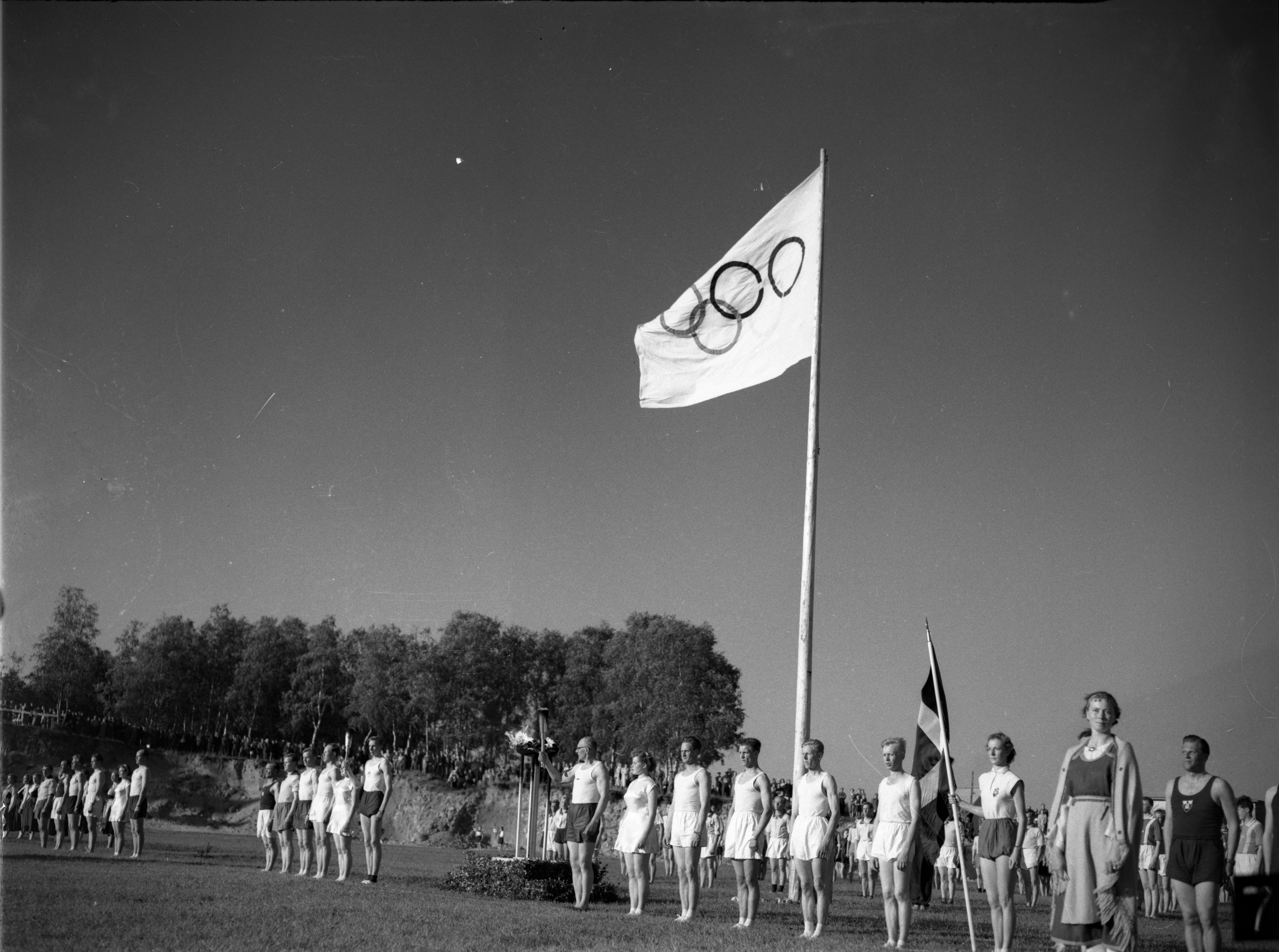
Merging of the Olympia and Pallastunturi flames at ceremony in Tornio

In Sweden the flame was carried overland via Gothenburg to Stockholm, where on 4 July it was kept burning overnight at the 1912 Olympics stadium. Afterwards it continued its journey north, eventually leaving Sweden by crossing the northern land border to Finland, where it was united with the 'Midnight Torch' flame on 8 July.

Over the next ten days the torch was carried south by 1,350 runners, arriving in Helsinki on the opening day of the games, 19 July. On its final stage through the city of Helsinki, the relay procession was fronted by a police car in radio contact with the organisers at the stadium, with the intention of adjusting the relay pace as needed. Consequently, the torch arrived at the stadium with perfect timing.

The distances and methods of transport in each country were as follows:

Country	Distance	Carried by
Greece	342 kilometres (213 mi)	Runners
Greece to Denmark	3,125 kilometres (1,942 mi)	Flight
Denmark	505 kilometres (314 mi), incl. 55 kilometres (34 mi) sea crossing to Sweden	Runners, cyclists, horse riders, canoeists, sailors
Sweden	2,392 kilometres (1,486 mi)	Runners
Finland	1,128 kilometres (701 mi)	Runners

The total relay distance was 7,492 kilometres (4,655 mi), excluding the separate 'Midnight Sun Torch' relay from Pallastunturi to Tornio.

The route took in the cities of, among others, Aalborg, Aarhus, Copenhagen, Malmö, Gothenburg, Stockholm, Uppsala, Tornio, Oulu, Jyväskylä, Tampere and Hämeenlinna, before reaching Helsinki.

A commemorative copper medal was given to each person carrying the torch on its journey.

== Lighting of the cauldron ==
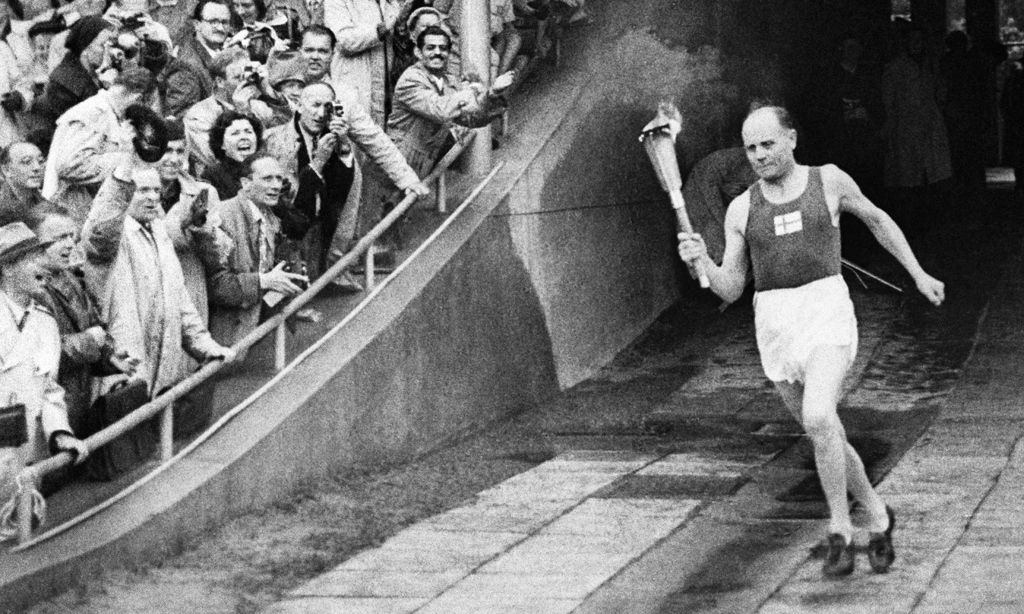
Paavo Nurmi entering the Olympic stadium

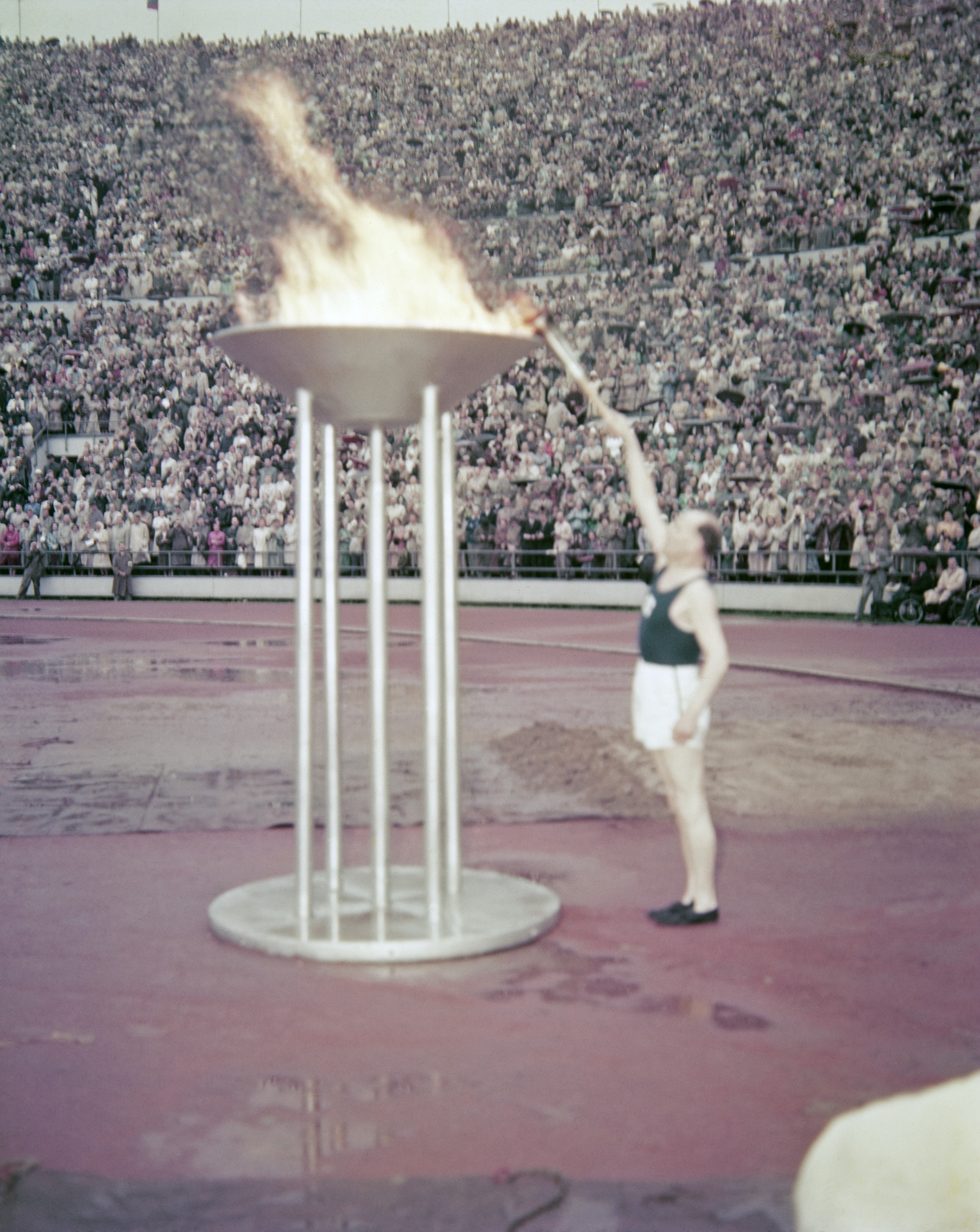
Nurmi lighting the temporary ground-level cauldron

The flame was brought to the Helsinki Olympic Stadium by the Finnish long-distance runner Paavo Nurmi, himself a winner of multiple gold and silver medals at the 1920, 1924 and 1928 Olympics. He used the torch to light a temporary cauldron on the stadium field.

The actual cauldron was situated on top of the stadium tower, 72 metres (236 ft) above the ground. Four players from a Helsinki football club ran up the tower with the torch, passing it to another Finnish long-distance runner, Hannes Kolehmainen, also a winner of multiple medals at the 1912 and 1920 Olympics, who finally lit the main cauldron.

== See also ==
- 1952 Summer Olympics
- Pallastunturi
- 1952 Winter Olympics torch relay
