= Yoshinori Sakai =

Japanese athlete

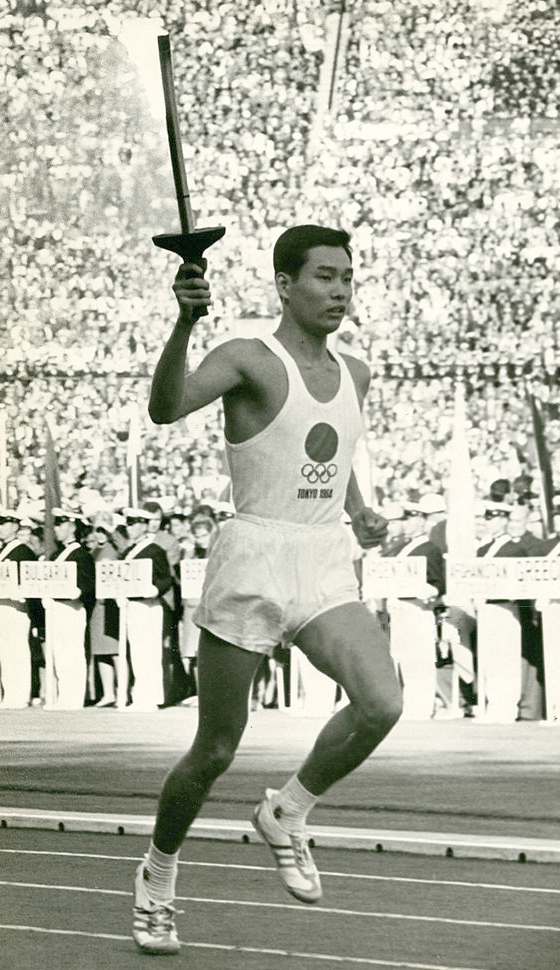
- Yoshinori Sakai at the 1964 Olympics

Personal information
- Born: August 6, 1945 Miyoshi, Hiroshima, Japan
- Died: September 10, 2014 (aged 69) Tokyo, Japan

Sport
- Country: Japan
- Sport: Athletics
- Club: Waseda University
Medal record
Asian Games
Gold medal – first place	1966 Bangkok	4×400 m relay
Silver medal – second place	1966 Bangkok	400 m

Yoshinori Sakai (坂井 義則, Sakai Yoshinori; August 6, 1945 – September 10, 2014) was the Olympic flame torchbearer who lit the cauldron at the 1964 Summer Olympic Games in Tokyo.

== Biography ==
Sakai was born in Hiroshima on 6 August 1945, the day an atomic bomb was dropped on that city. He was chosen for the role to symbolize Japan's postwar reconstruction and peace. An enthusiastic part-time athlete, at the time of the 1964 Olympics he was a member of Waseda University's running club. The nineteen-year-old was coached in the ceremonial duty by Teruji Kogake, a triple jump world record-holder turned coach. He never actually competed in any events at the Olympics.

Two years after the Olympics, he won a gold medal in the 4 × 400 m relay and a silver in the 400 m at the 1966 Asian Games. He joined Fuji Television in 1968 as a journalist and worked mainly in the fields of news and sports.

He died of cerebral bleeding in Tokyo at age 69, on September 10, 2014.

Olympic Games
Preceded by Josl Rieder	Final Olympic torchbearer Tokyo 1964	Succeeded by Alain Calmat
Preceded by Giancarlo Peris	Final Summer Olympic torchbearer Tokyo 1964	Succeeded by Norma Enriqueta Basilio de Sotelo
