= Archery at the 1984 Summer Paralympics – Men's double FITA round integrated =

Men's double FITA round integrated at the VII Paralympic Games
- Paralympic Archery
- Competitors: 29 from 15 nations

Medalists
1st place, gold medalist(s)		Jan Thulin	Sweden
2nd place, silver medalist(s)		Antonio Rebollo	Spain
3rd place, bronze medalist(s)		Raimo Tirronen	Finland

The Men's double FITA round integrated was an archery competition at the 1984 Summer Paralympics.

The Swedish archer, Jan Thulin won the gold medal.

== Results ==
Rank	Athlete	Points
1st place, gold medalist(s)	Jan Thulin (SWE)	2375
2nd place, silver medalist(s)	Antonio Rebollo (ESP)	2266
3rd place, bronze medalist(s)	Raimo Tirronen (FIN)	2236
4	T. Mancini (ITA)	2230
5	Rene Ducret (FRA)	2218
6	Manfred Boeckers (FRG)	2179
7	R. Schinn (AUS)	2176
8	Marco Schreiner (LUX)	2160
9	Hak Young Lee (KOR)	2155
10	S. Siilin (FIN)	2153
11	Manfred Brenne (FRG)	2123
12	George Hamart (FRA)	2110
13	A. Molanari (ITA)	2105
14	Finn Larsen (DEN)	2101
15	J. Alku (FIN)	2093
16	G. Klein (HUN)	2093
17	E. Bofareull (ESP)	2059
18	Daniel Lelou (FRA)	2039
19	Nicolai Babkin (SWE)	2026
20	Arne Tjernell (SWE)	2021
21	Hilmar Butenhoff (FRG)	2018
22	S. Ahlinder (SWE)	1941
23	J. Johansen (NOR)	1941
24	W. Law (HKG)	1894
25	Sune Appelkvist (SWE)	1810
26	J. Karlsson (SWE)	1724
27	V. Langford (GBR)	1539
28	P. Hilderley (GBR)	1300
29	G. Palumbo (USA)	914
