= 1952 Winter Olympics torch relay =

- Host city: Oslo, Norway
- Countries visited: Norway
- Distance: 225 km (140 miles)
- Torchbearers: 94
- Start date: 13 February 1952
- End date: 15 February 1952
- No. of torches: 95

The 1952 Winter Olympics torch relay was the first time that a flame was transported as part of the build-up to the Winter Olympics. While similar to the inaugural Summer Olympics torch relay of 1936 the Olympic Flame did not start in Olympia, instead the relay began in Morgedal, Norway, the birthplace of competitive skiing. Indeed, the Norwegian Olympic Committee were keen to stress that this was not the traditional transfer of the Olympic flame but a separate event that symbolised the use of torches while skiing in the dark. It was not until the 1964 Winter Olympics that the relay could be said to transport a true Olympic flame originating from Olympia.

== Organization ==
Olav S. Bjaaland, a teacher in Morgedal, proposed the idea of a cross-country ski relay from Morgedal to Oslo in 1948. The process was seen as a good way to mark the commencement of the Games. The International Olympic Committee (IOC) agreed that the relay could go ahead, including winning support from the IOC president, but that this relay would not carry the true Olympic flame as had been established as protocol in the Summer Games since 1936. Instead this torch was passed in the same way that Norwegian skiers historically did while travelling in the dark. Organisational duties were given to the committee for decorations and ceremonies. The flame would not be lit in Olympia, and a location would be chosen that symbolised the birthplace of skiing and Winter events. Since the 1964 relay the process has changed to bring the relay in line with the Summer Olympics and to officially carry the Olympic flame. While there were attempts to give the "Morgedal Flame" the same significance as the Olympic flame the IOC have insisted that all Olympic Games should use the symbolic fire lit in Olympia.

== Relay elements ==
=== Torch ===
The nine inch long torch was designed to cope with any weather condition that the relay team would face. Its cylindrical handle was topped off by a large, oval collar that depicted the Olympic rings, the year, and an arrow pointing from the start and end points of the relay (Morgedal and Oslo).

=== Torch-bearers ===
A total of 94 renowned skiers or their descendants participated in the relay, the names of whom remained secret until they began their leg of the journey.

=== Route ===
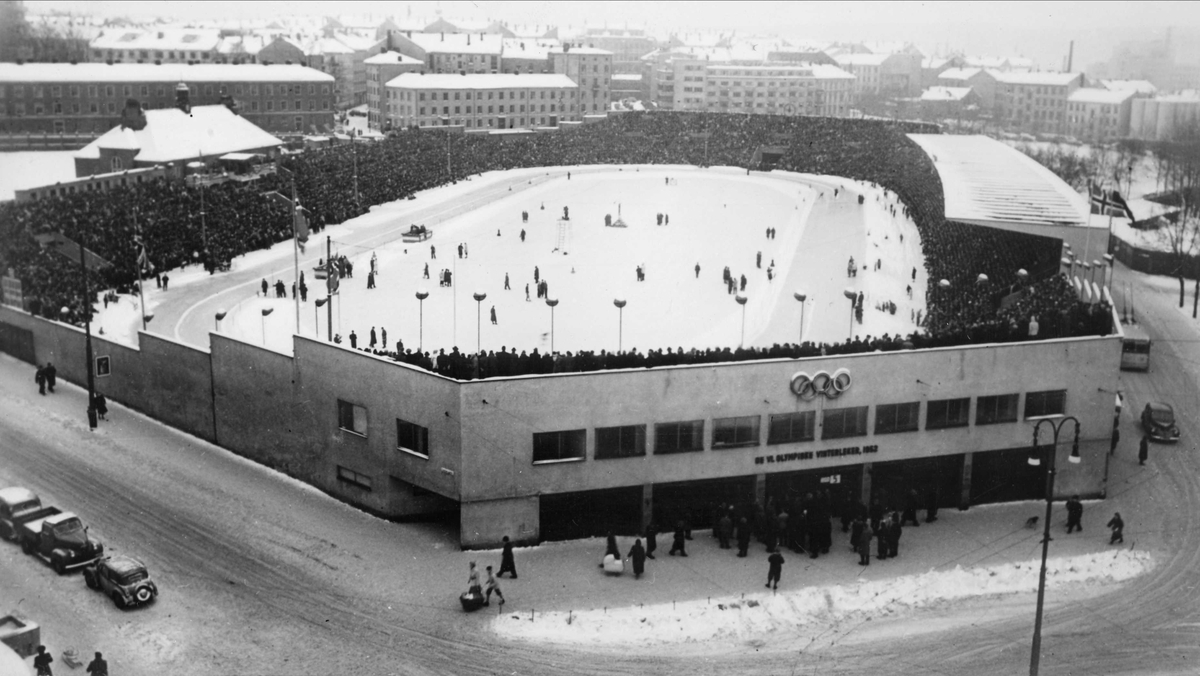
The stadium in Bislett, the final destination of the relay

The relay began on 13 February at the Morgedal home of Sondre Norheim, a pioneer in competitive skiing. The location was chosen to celebrate the birthplace of skiing and the origins of such sporting events. In 1868 Norheim had skied from Morgedal to Oslo to compete in a skiing competition that was being hosted in the city.

It would be fitting for a person of high regard to start the relay. Olav Bjaaland, the grandfather of the man who proposed the relay, was a member of the 1911 South Pole expedition. He was given the honour of kindling the fire, and did so by lighting a pine torch in the hearth of Norheim's home. He then passed the flame to the first relay skier. The torch relay then followed the route that Norheim is believed to have taken to Oslo.

=== Lighting of the cauldron ===
The final stretch of the relay to Bislett was undertaken by ski champion Lauritz Bergendahl on 15 February. On arrival at the Marathon Gate of the Stadium he passed the torch to the final torch-bearer, Eigil Nansen, grandson of explorer, winter event champion and Nobel Peace Prize-winning diplomat Fridtjof Nansen. Nansen skied with the torch around the snow embankment before walking up to and lighting the "Olympic Altar".

== See also ==
- 1952 Summer Olympics torch relay
