= Curly birch =

Variety of flowering plant

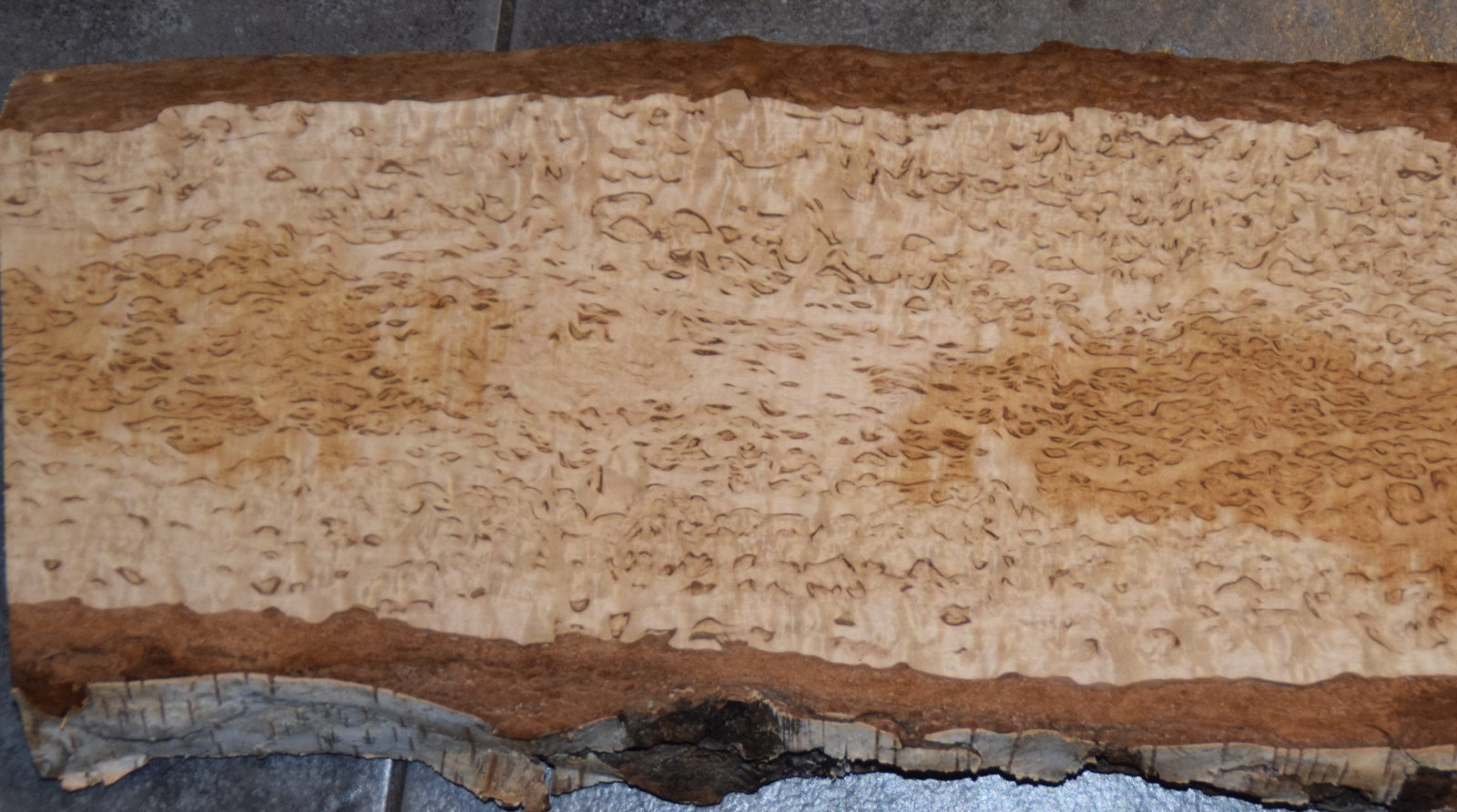
Curly birch wood

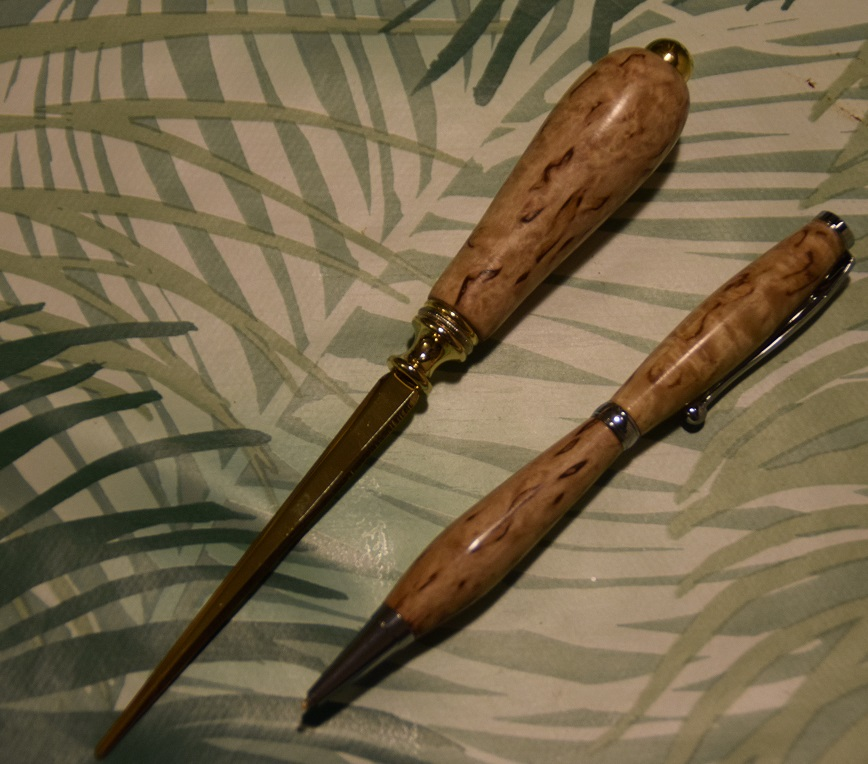
Pen and letter opener

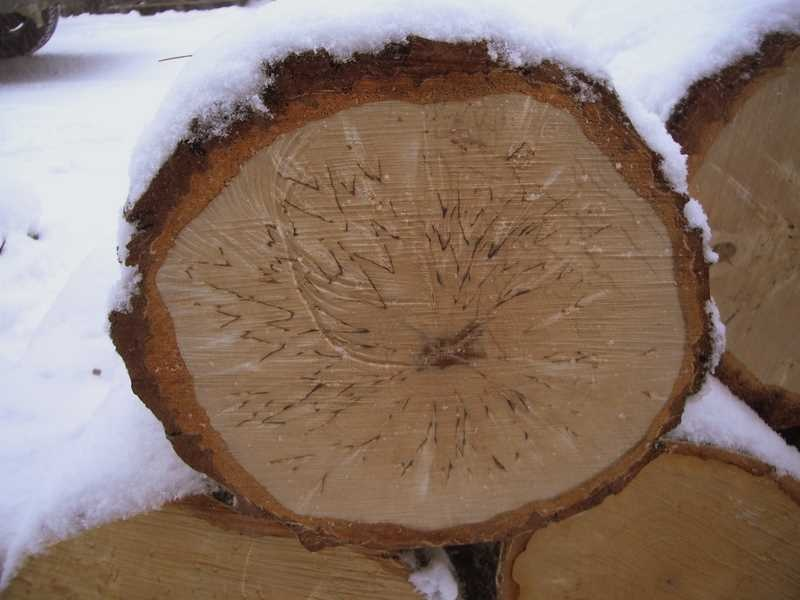
V pattern in the cross-sectional view

Curly birch (Betula pendula var. carelica) is a variant of the plant species silver birch (also known as warty birch, European white birch, or East Asian white birch) with a genetic defect that causes the tree to twist on the stem with curls. The annual rings are oriented incorrectly, which gives the wood a fiery appearance. The variant originally comes from Karelia in Finland and Russia. The curliness is passed on in up to 70% of all trees in the next generation. Common spring birch is also sometimes referred to as masur birch, but one should only use that term for trees that have the real curliness.

== The wood ==
The annual rings are wavelike and irregular, with brown curly-grained wood tissue cells often exhibiting a V pattern in the cross-sectional view. If this pattern continues evenly across the entire surface, the result is a starlike pattern (a.k.a. curly-grain blossom). The longitudinal section of the stem exhibits lenslike patterns. The wood of curly birch is dense and very heavy, when freshly felled it can rise to 930 kg/m^{3}, and at 12% moisture approx. 700–730 kg/m^{3}. Curly birch exhibits some exceptional leaf forms, but these cannot be used as certain identifiers. The irregular bud formation connected to curly-grainedness results in abundant branching and bushy habit among curly birches.

Curly birch wood is used for furniture, musical instruments and decorative items.

== Distribution ==
The curly birch is found naturally only in Europe and only in small separate areas. In Finland, it occurs naturally in Southern Finland up to the latitude of Jyväskylä, and especially in former swidden areas. In the other Nordic countries, curly birch occurs in parts of southern Sweden and in the most south-easterly parts of Norway. In addition to the above, curly birch is to be found in the Russia (Karelia, Ingria, and some other western areas), in the Baltic countries, and in Belarus. There also are scattered stands of curly birch in Central Europe. However, curly birch is most abundant in Finland and in the Karelia region of Russia.
