= Brenda Deen Schildgen =

American historian

Brenda Deen Schildgen is a distinguished professor emerita and former chair of comparative literature at the UC Davis specializing in the European Middle Ages, the Bible as Literature, Dante, the relationship between history and fiction, and Jewish, Christian, and Moslem relations in the European Middle Ages.

Brenda Deen Schildgen was born to the family of naturalized immigrants to Great Britain, Anna Friedman and Nasir Din, Jewish mother and Muslim father, married in London in 1942.

== Education ==
Deen Schildgen received a PhD in Comparative Literature from Indiana University Bloomington. Her MA thesis was entitled The Theophilus Legend: Three Versions. M.A., Comparative Literature, Indiana University Bloomington. She received her PhD in Comparative Literature also at Indiana University in 1972 with a dissertation titled Geoffrey Chaucer's Canterbury Tales and Juan Ruiz' El Libro de Buen Amor. In 1989, she completed an M.A. in Religious Studies (thesis: "Habits of the mind: prejudice and ideology in the reading of the Gospel of Mark"), University of San Francisco; B.A., English and French, University of Wisconsin–Madison.

== Books ==
- 2025 Boccaccio Defends Literature
- 2021: Dante and Violence: Domestic, Civic, Cosmic (William and Katherine Devers Series in Dante and Medieval Italian Literature)
- 2012: Divine Providence: A History: The Bible, Virgil, Orosius, Augustine, and Dante
- 2008: Heritage or Heresy: Destruction and Preservation of Art and Architecture in Europe
- 2003: (with Van Den Georges Abbeele) A World of Fables
- 2002: Dante and the Orient, translated into Italian (2015) and Arabic (2010)
- 2001: Pagans, Tartars, Jews, and Moslems in Chaucer's Canterbury Tales
- 1999: Power and Prejudice: Reception of the Gospel of Mark
- 1998: Crisis and Continuity: Time in the Gospel of Mark

She is also the co-editor of several books including Other Renaissances.

== Awards ==
- 2022: Helen and Howard Marraro Prize for Dante and Violence; award quotation: "This persuasive, well-written, and meticulously researched work explores how Dante’s Commedia Divina approached the impact of violence, broadly conceived from warfare to forced marriage, on the household, especially women, 'civic and political domains,' and on 'the divine or cosmic realm.'"
- 2008: University of California, Davis Prize for Undergraduate Teaching and Scholarly Achievement
- 1999: recipient of a Best Academic Book Choice award for Power and Prejudice
