= Fritz Schilgen =

German athlete

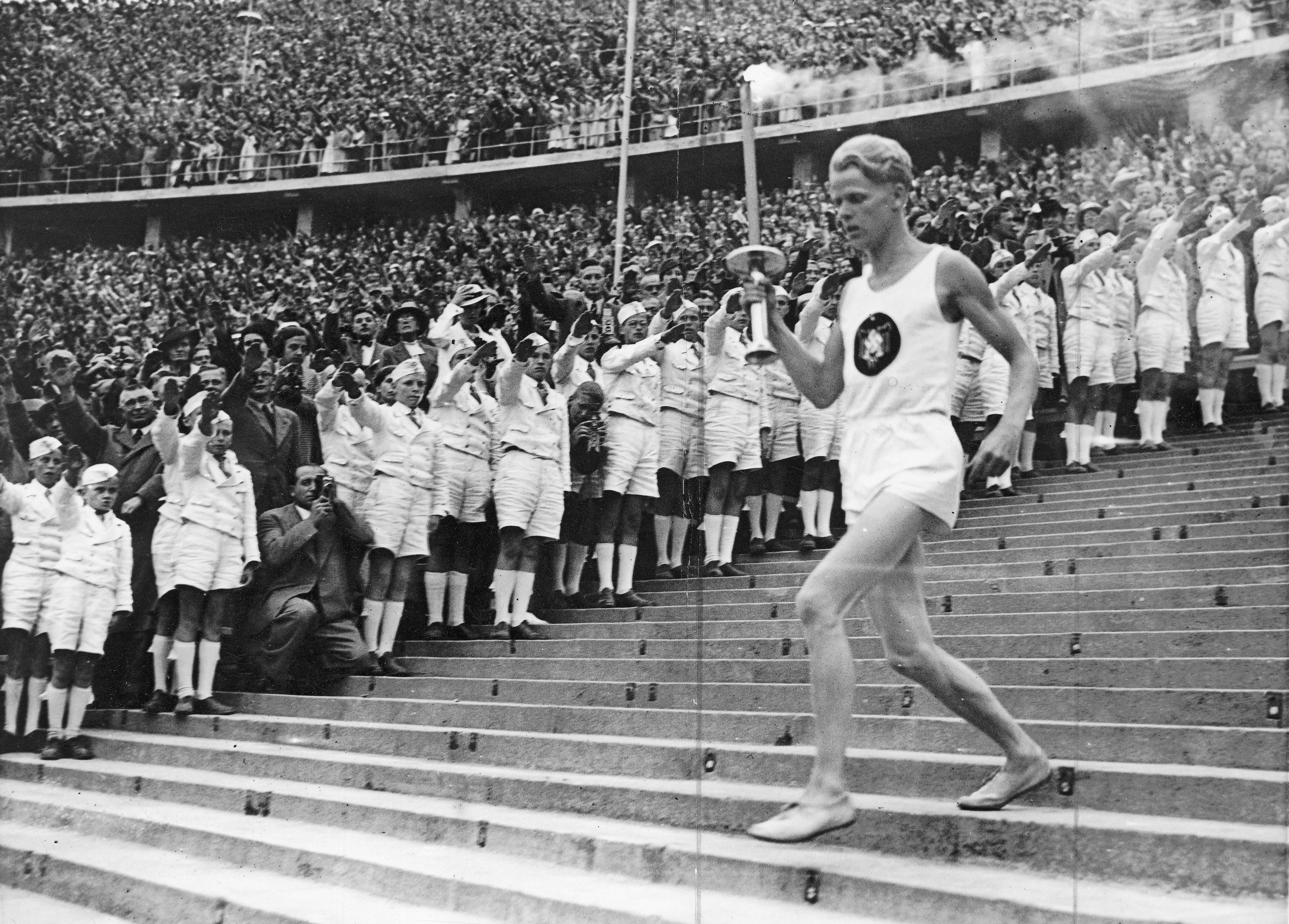
- Schilgen at the 1936 Olympics
- Born: 8 September 1906; Kronberg im Taunus, Grand Duchy of Hesse, German Empire
- Died: 12 September 2005 (aged 99); Kronberg im Taunus, Hesse, Germany
- Occupation: Athlete

Fritz Schilgen (8 September 1906 – 12 September 2005) was a German athlete and the final torchbearer of the first Olympic torch relay at the 1936 Summer Games.

== Biography ==
Schilgen was born in 1906 in Kronberg im Taunus, near Frankfurt, the second son of the principal of the Kronberger high school. After the First World War, he began his career as a middle- and long-distance runner. He studied electrical engineering at Darmstadt University of Technology; in his career as an engineer he developed 35 patents. Schilgen finished in third place in the German Championships in 1929, 1931, and 1933 in the 1500-metre run, representing the sports club ASC Darmstadt. He also won the silver medal in the 4 x 400 metres relay at the 1928 World University Games, and the bronze medal in the 5000 metres run at those games in 1930– in a stadium having a telecommunications system Schilgen himself had designed.

On 21 March 1936, he married Ursula Gerlach. They had five children: Walter, Regine, Sibylle, Michael and Horst.

Schilgen was chosen by the organizers of the relay as a "symbol of German sporting youth" and for his beautiful and graceful running style, as determined by the aesthetics commission. His dramatic lighting of the flame in the Olympic Stadium is captured in Olympia, a Nazi propaganda film about the Games by Leni Riefenstahl, who also helped devise the torch relay and select Schilgen as final torchbearer. Schilgen himself did not compete in the Olympics.

Schilgen's involvement in the Olympics continued after the 1936 Games. After the Second World War he was a consultant to the Olympic Committee. He helped to plan the 1972 Summer Olympics in Munich. At the age of 90, Schilgen participated as a torchbearer again before the 1996 Summer Olympics. The 1996 Games celebrated the centennial of the modern Olympic Games, and Schilgen had the honour of lighting the cauldron in Berlin's Olympic Stadium once again. Schilgen died in Kronberg in 2005 at the age of 99.

== See also ==
Olympic Games
| Preceded by First Final Torchbearer | Final Summer Olympic torchbearer Berlin 1936 | Succeeded by John Mark |
