= 1984 Summer Olympics torch relay =

- Host city: Los Angeles, California, United States
- Countries visited: Greece, United States
- Distance: 9,375 miles (15,088 km)
- Torchbearers: 3,636
- Start date: May 8, 1984
- End date: July 28, 1984
- Torch designer: Newhart, Turner Industries
- No. of torches: 4,500

The 1984 Summer Olympics torch relay was run from May 8 until July 28, prior to the 1984 Summer Olympics in Los Angeles. It was commonly referred to as the AT&T Olympic Torch Relay, reflecting the lead sponsor of the event. The relay crossed the United States from New York City to Los Angeles, with 3,636 torchbearers running with the torch along a 9,375-mile (15,088 km) route. It was by far the longest Olympic torch relay that had been organized up to that point, creating the precedent for the Olympic flame to tour all parts of the host country rather than traveling directly to the opening ceremony.

It was the first torch relay to be funded primarily by corporate sponsorships, a decision which received backlash from Greek organizers, who threatened not to light the flame until days before the relay began. It was also the first time in Olympic history that ordinary members of the public, rather than carefully selected teams of runners, were permitted to carry the Olympic torch. That changed in LA as any person could become the torchbearer. Through the "Youth Legacy Kilometer" program, any person or group which donated $3,000 to selected charities would be permitted to run with the torch for 1 kilometer (0.62 mi). The program raised nearly $11 million for the YMCA of the USA, the Boys Club of America, the Girls Club of America, and the Special Olympics.

The relay culminated in the Olympics' opening ceremony on July 28. Rafer Johnson was the final torchbearer who lit the cauldron, becoming the first black athlete in history to do so.

== Torch ==
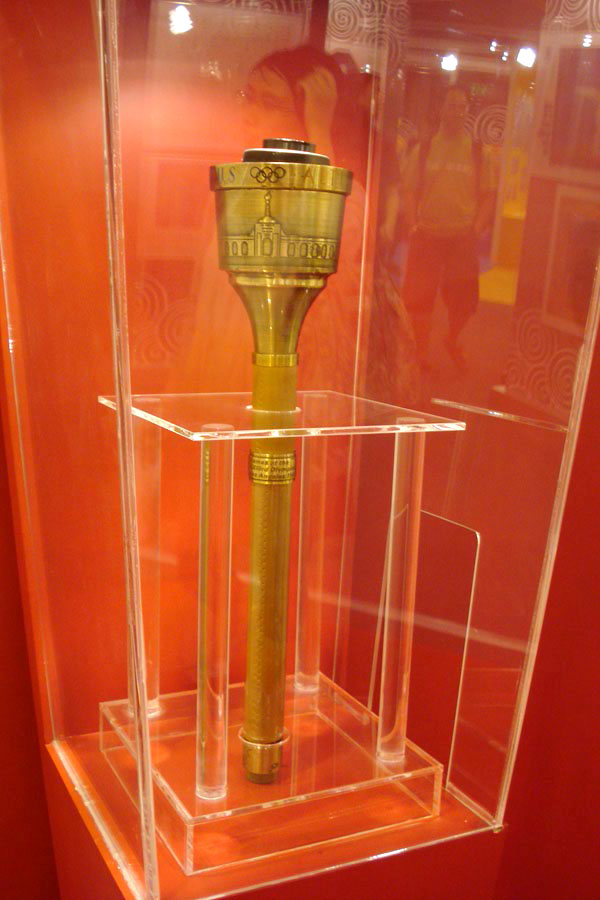
A torch from the relay

The aluminum torch, designed with a brass finish and leather handle that gave it an antique look, was 56.5 centimeters (22.2 in) long and weighed 1,000 grams (35 oz). Etched on the ring of the torch were the words of the Olympic motto ("Citius, Altius, Fortius") with the Olympic rings between each word. They were manufactured by Turner Industries of Sycamore, Illinois, and each one was numbered. After the trial run in March, the original design of the torch was found to be flawed. The valve was found to be recessed too deeply inside the bowl of the torch and was extinguished too easily. The type of propane and the valve used for its release were also adjusted to ensure that it would remain lit wherever possible.

== Organization ==
Planning for the relay began in 1981, when the idea of the Youth Legacy Kilometer program was first conceived. Under this program, individuals and organizations could sponsor a kilometer of the relay, which would give them the right to carry the torch along that segment of the route or to choose others who would be allowed to do so. The cost to sponsor a kilometer was $3,000, the proceeds of which would be donated to charity. Peter Ueberroth, chair of the Los Angeles Olympic Organizing Committee (LAOOC), later wrote that he first conceived of the idea of running the torch across the length of the country, which had not been done before. There was no torch relay when Los Angeles hosted the Olympics in 1932; the only previous Olympic torch relays in the United States had been in the lead-up to the 1960 Winter Olympics, where it was taken from Los Angeles to a ski resort near Lake Tahoe, and the 1980 Winter Olympics, traveling from Yorktown, Virginia, to Lake Placid, New York. A closer precedent had occurred in 1963, when an unofficial Olympic-inspired flame was run from Los Angeles to Detroit to promote that city's bid for the 1968 Summer Olympics, which was unsuccessful. Although his fellow organizers were extremely skeptical that a cross-country relay would be practical, Ueberroth continued to push for it and eventually succeeded.

Shortly after AT&T became a sponsor of the Olympic Games in 1982, organizers tasked the company's Long Lines Division with handling the logistics of the relay event. AT&T employees would also be responsible for carrying the flame in areas where a sponsor had not been found. AT&T's role in the relay coincided with the company being forced to divest its regional operating companies at the beginning of 1984; the Long Lines Division was not affected by the divestiture. The Boys Club of America, the Girls Club of America, and the YMCA of the USA shared responsibility for marketing the event and for disbursing the funds raised as part of the relay. Additional sponsors included Burson-Marsteller, the PR agency of AT&T, which helped to organize the relay provided the majority of the staffing for the events; Levi Strauss & Co., which provided the runner uniforms; Converse, which supplied the shoes; and General Motors, which built custom GMC and Buick vehicles to follow and support the runners, specially designed to travel at slow speeds for long periods of time.

At the 86th IOC Session in New Delhi, India, in March 1983, the LAOOC presented its plans for the relay. Under the LAOOC's initial proposal, the relay would have started in early April and lasted for nearly four months, more than twice the length of any previous Olympic torch relay. The Hellenic Olympic Committee (HOC), responsible for lighting the flame in Olympia, conveying it to Athens, and handing it over to the host nation, opposed the plan, claiming that the sponsorships were commercializing the symbol of the Olympic flame. Furthermore, the HOC refused to stage its portion of the torch relay so early, since the torch had traditionally been carried through Greece by children who would still be in school in April. As a result, the relay was scaled back to last less than three months, but the dispute over the sponsorship program remained unresolved.

Plans for the relay and a preliminary route were first publicly announced on July 28, 1983, one year before the Games' opening ceremony, in two simultaneous press conferences in New York City and Los Angeles. The proposed route would have begun on May 8, 1984, in New York, then passed through all 50 states (Alaska and Hawaii being visited only by branch routes which would split off from the main torch in Seattle) before arriving in Los Angeles for the opening ceremony.

However, given the later start date, organizers realized that this route, covering over 16,000 miles (26,000 km), would require runners to carry the torch 24 hours a day and would be logistically impractical. Additionally, the Youth Legacy Kilometer program had fallen below expectations, with only 2,000 of the available 10,000 kilometers sponsored by the end of 1983. Political consultant Wally McGuire was tasked with designing a more realistic route, which was shortened to 9,375 miles (15,088 km) through 33 states and the District of Columbia. McGuire presented his proposal to the LAOOC on January 3, 1984, and details about the new route were made public the next day. Two advance teams, one starting from New York and one starting from Los Angeles, surveyed and finalized the route, meeting in Steamboat Springs, Colorado, on February 15.

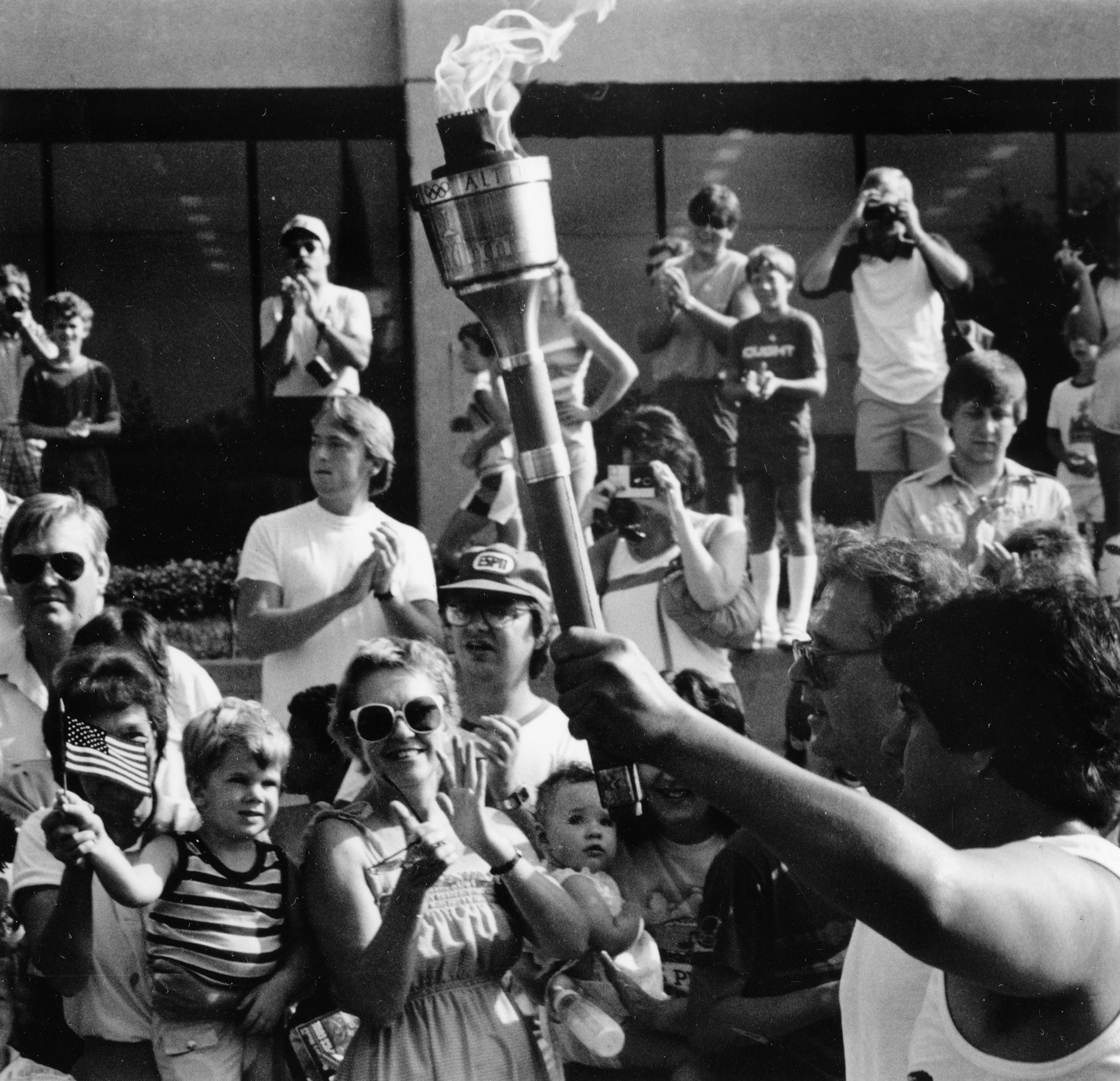
Olympic torch at the University of Texas at Arlington, 1984

On February 1, Kimon Koulouris, the Greek minister of sports, announced that the government would not allow the flame to be used for commercial purposes, jeopardizing the relay plans. The mayor of Olympia, Spyros Foteinos, added that the town also would not agree to participate in the event if it was commercialized, saying that the American delegation would have to light the flame themselves. During IOC meetings at the Winter Olympics which began a few days later in Sarajevo, this opposition continued. In response, the LAOOC agreed to stop accepting new sponsorships on March 20, and the Greek delegation tentatively agreed to participate in the relay. In order to keep Greek participation in the relay to a minimum, and to avoid the possibility of protests along the route there, organizers considered transmitting the flame to New York in the form of a laser beam by satellite, as had been done in 1976 between Athens and Montreal.

LAOOC general manager Harry Usher insisted that "we have not commercialized the torch run" and that "the object is to carry the torch with the same dignity it has always had in Olympic tradition." This reputation was further damaged, however, after the Caesars Tahoe Palace casino resort sponsored 50 kilometers of the Nevada route and announced that it would raffle them off to customers, who would win a place in the relay, a two-night stay at the resort, and a cash prize of $1,984. The LAOOC forced Caesars to scale back its promotion. Ultimately, seven of the kilometer segments were given to winning customers, 42 went to local organizations, and the remaining kilometer was given to 1976 decathlon winner Bruce Jenner (now known as Caitlyn Jenner), who had signed a promotional contract with Caesars.

A test run for the relay was held from March 18 through March 24, from Trenton, New Jersey, to Cleveland, Ohio, following the same route on the same days of the week as the relay. Based on this experience, the design of the torch was modified to ensure that the flame would not go out during the run, and other logistical changes were made.

Despite the compromise that had been worked out between Greek and American officials, on April 25, eight days before the planned lighting ceremony at Olympia, the Hellenic Athletics Federation told its members not to participate in the relay to Athens in protest. The next day, the Olympia ceremony was abruptly canceled. According to Peter Ueberroth's memoirs, IOC president Juan Antonio Samaranch, who had assured the LAOOC throughout the dispute that the flame would be handed over without problems, dispatched two students to Olympia, where they lit their own Olympic flame and brought it back to IOC headquarters in Lausanne, Switzerland. With their leverage over the flame removed, Ueberroth wrote, the Greek organizers agreed to hold an official lighting ceremony. Reportedly, American organizers also threatened not to allow Greek athletes to walk in the Parade of Nations first at the opening ceremony, as is traditional.

== Relay and notable torchbearers ==
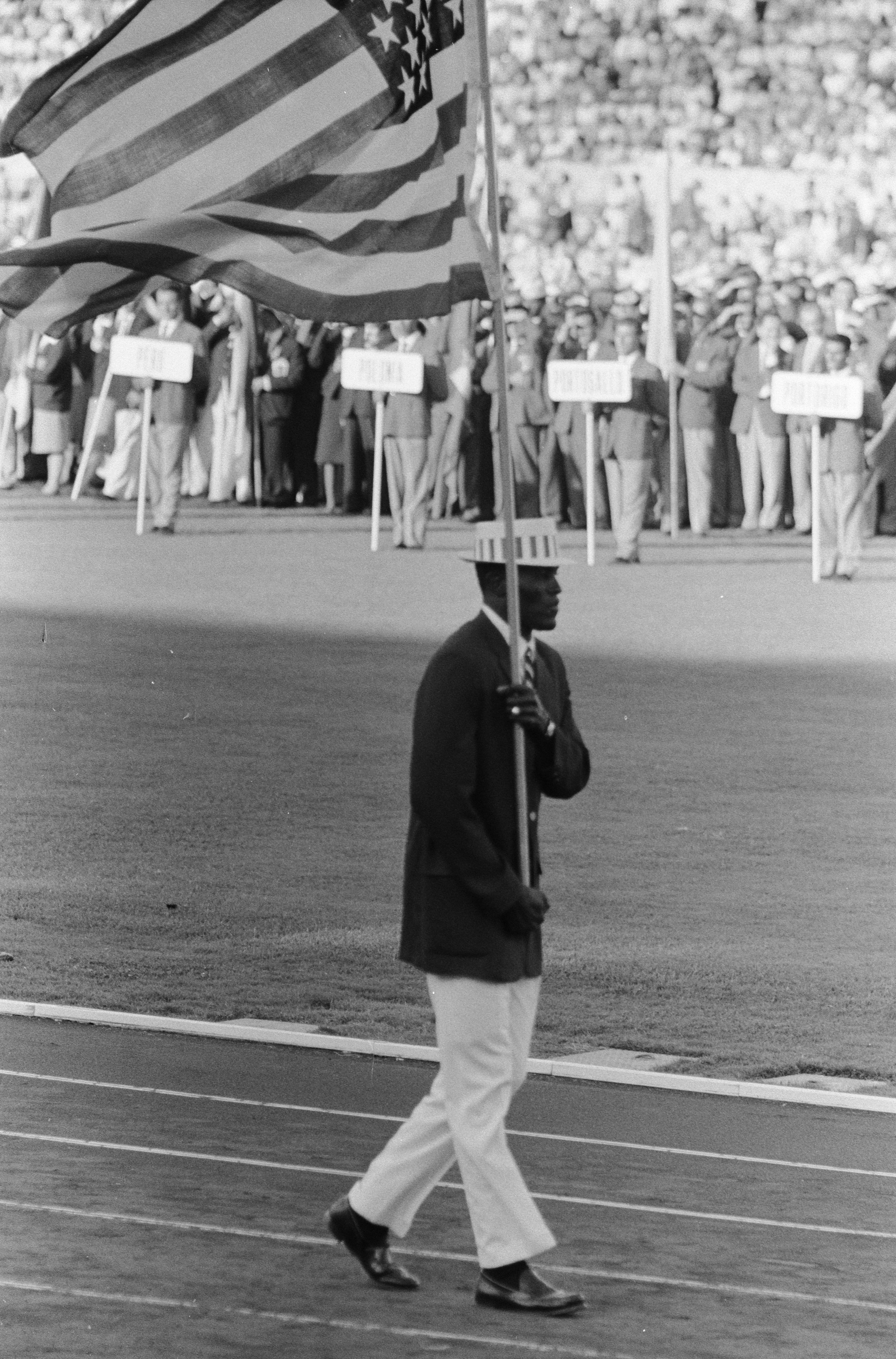
Rafer Johnson, pictured here as a flagbearer at the 1960 Games, carried the torch in New York City and Dallas before lighting the cauldron in Los Angeles.

The flame was lit in a private ceremony at Olympia on May 7, with spectators not permitted as was usual. It was then flown by helicopter to Athens, and carried on a jet airliner owned by the U.S. federal government to New York. The flame was brought to the United Nations Plaza on the morning of May 8, where a cauldron was lit by 1960 Olympic decathlon champion Rafer Johnson. He became the first black athlete to do so in world history. The first kilometer of the relay was run by Bill Thorpe Jr., grandson of Jim Thorpe, and Gina Hemphill, granddaughter of Jesse Owens. The second kilometer was run by Abel Kiviat, the oldest living American to have competed in the Olympics at the age of 91. Two hours after the relay began, the Soviet Union announced it would boycott the Olympics. Olympic boxer Mark Breland also carried the torch in Manhattan.

Unlike later Olympic torch relays, the 1984 event was run entirely on foot, with no other means of transportation used after the flame landed in New York. In areas where no people or organizations had signed up for the Youth Legacy Kilometer program, the torch was carried by a series of "cadre" runners who were members of the Telephone Pioneers of America, a non-profit organization consisting of current and former AT&T employees. At all times, the torch runners were accompanied by a caravan of support vehicles, custom-designed for the relay by sponsor General Motors. The torch was run for roughly 14 to 20 hours per day at a pace of roughly seven miles per hour.

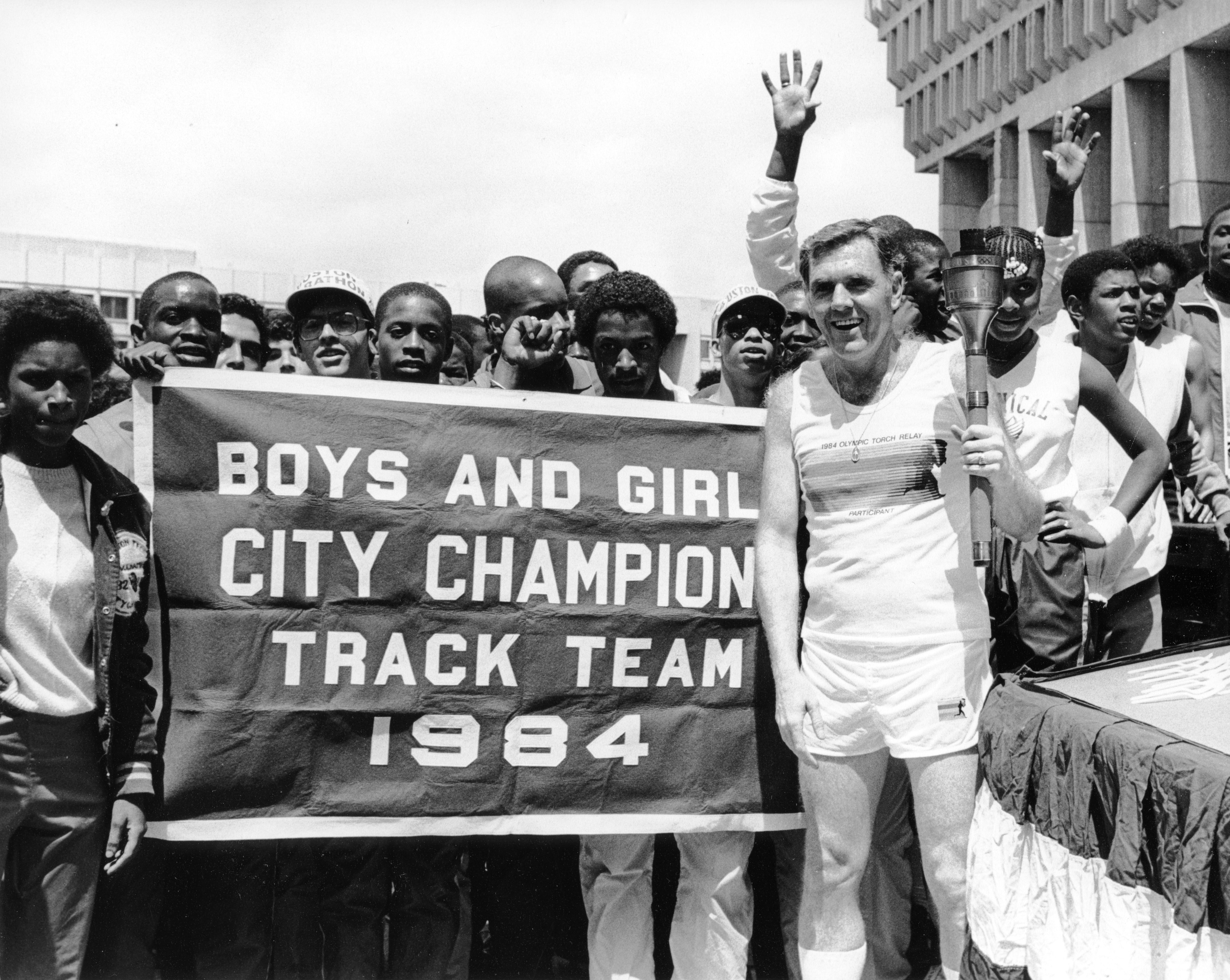
Boston mayor Raymond Flynn holds the torch in front of City Hall.

From New York, the relay first traveled northeast to Boston, then backtracked across Connecticut, New York, and New Jersey to reach Philadelphia. Olympic basketball gold medalist and U.S. senator Bill Bradley ran a kilometer in Trenton, New Jersey. Paralyzed news reporter Chris O'Donoghue carried the torch in his wheelchair in Baltimore. In Washington, D.C., the torch was brought to the White House, where it was greeted by President Ronald Reagan.

West of Washington, the relay traversed the Appalachian Mountains in West Virginia on its way to Pittsburgh. The flame visited Cleveland and Detroit in late May. The route briefly looped through Chicago, where it was carried by Olympic athlete Willye White and Chicago Bears star running back Walter Payton, before returning eastward into Indiana on its way to Indianapolis. The run through Indianapolis on May 26 took place in the midst of Memorial Day weekend festivities leading up to the 1984 Indianapolis 500, which was held the following day. Gary Romesser, who had won the 500 Festival Mini-Marathon the previous day, carried the torch at the head of the 500 Festival Parade.

Muhammad Ali ran with the torch in his hometown of Louisville, Kentucky, while another Olympic gold medalist from the state, Tamara McKinney, started the next day's leg in Lexington. The First Lady of Tennessee, Leslee "Honey" Alexander, wife of Governor Lamar Alexander, carried the torch onto the University of Tennessee campus in Knoxville.

From Knoxville, the torch traveled south through the Great Smoky Mountains to Atlanta, then followed U.S. Route 78 west to Memphis, Tennessee. Olympic hurdler Thomas Hill ran with the torch in Blytheville, Arkansas, as it skirted the bank of the Mississippi River up to St. Louis. Wilma Rudolph carried it under the Gateway Arch, handing it to St. Louis Cardinals star player Ozzie Smith. Missouri governor Kit Bond held the torch at the state capitol in Jefferson City, while Kansas City saw the relay's oldest torchbearer, 99-year-old Ansel Stubbs, pass the flame to its youngest, 4-year-old Katie Johnston.

The relay crossed the eastern part of Kansas southward to Oklahoma. In Oklahoma City, governor George Nigh was joined by Jim Thorpe's son Richard Thorpe for a ceremony at the state capitol. Rafer Johnson carried the torch again in Dallas, Texas, passing it onward to Dallas Cowboys player Bob Hayes (the only athlete with both an Olympic gold medal and a Super Bowl ring). In nearby Azle, a runner was burned by the torch and required medical attention. The border between Farwell, Texas, and Texico, New Mexico, was officially designated as the halfway point of the cross-country route, as it was reached on June 17, the 41st day of the 82-day relay.

After passing through Albuquerque, the torch was taken northward into Colorado. Hank Kashiwa carried the torch into Denver. Governor Richard Lamm received the flame on the mile-high step of the Colorado State Capitol and ran with it for a kilometer before passing it to Denver mayor Federico Peña, who carried it down the 16th Street Mall – both politicians dressed in the official runner's uniform. The torch was then carried through the Rocky Mountains, crossing the Continental Divide at Berthoud Pass. Henry Marsh and mayor Ted Wilson ran with the torch in Salt Lake City, Utah. Christin Cooper was the grand marshal of a torch parade in Twin Falls, Idaho.

The torch crossed northeastern Oregon and much of Washington state before reaching the Pacific coast at Seattle, where it was carried by Hugh Foley. Johnny Bumphus ran with it in nearby Tacoma. Proceeding southward to Portland, the torch followed the Willamette Valley to Eugene, then crossed the Cascade Mountains to Klamath Falls. On July 11, the flame was brought into the host state of California at Hatfield, near Tulelake.

Eagle Lake Road in Lassen County, California, reportedly the only county-maintained road used in the California leg of the relay as opposed to state and federal highways and city streets, was renamed Route of the Olympic Torch, a name it still bears today. The torch briefly left California to pass through Reno, Nevada, where a local resident was killed in a vehicular accident when traffic was halted for the relay, as well as the state capital of Carson City. The segment sponsored by Caesars Tahoe brought the torch back into California the next day, with Jenner carrying the torch along the casino row in Stateline, Nevada, on its way to South Lake Tahoe.

Nancy Ditz carried the torch across the Golden Gate Bridge into San Francisco. The arrival of the torch on July 16 coincided with the opening of the 1984 Democratic National Convention, which also took place in San Francisco that same day. The Democratic candidates nominated at the convention, Walter Mondale and Geraldine Ferraro, had watched the torch pass by while staying in South Lake Tahoe a few days earlier. Mayor Lionel Wilson carried the torch through Oakland, while Congressman Ed Zschau brought it onto the Stanford University campus.

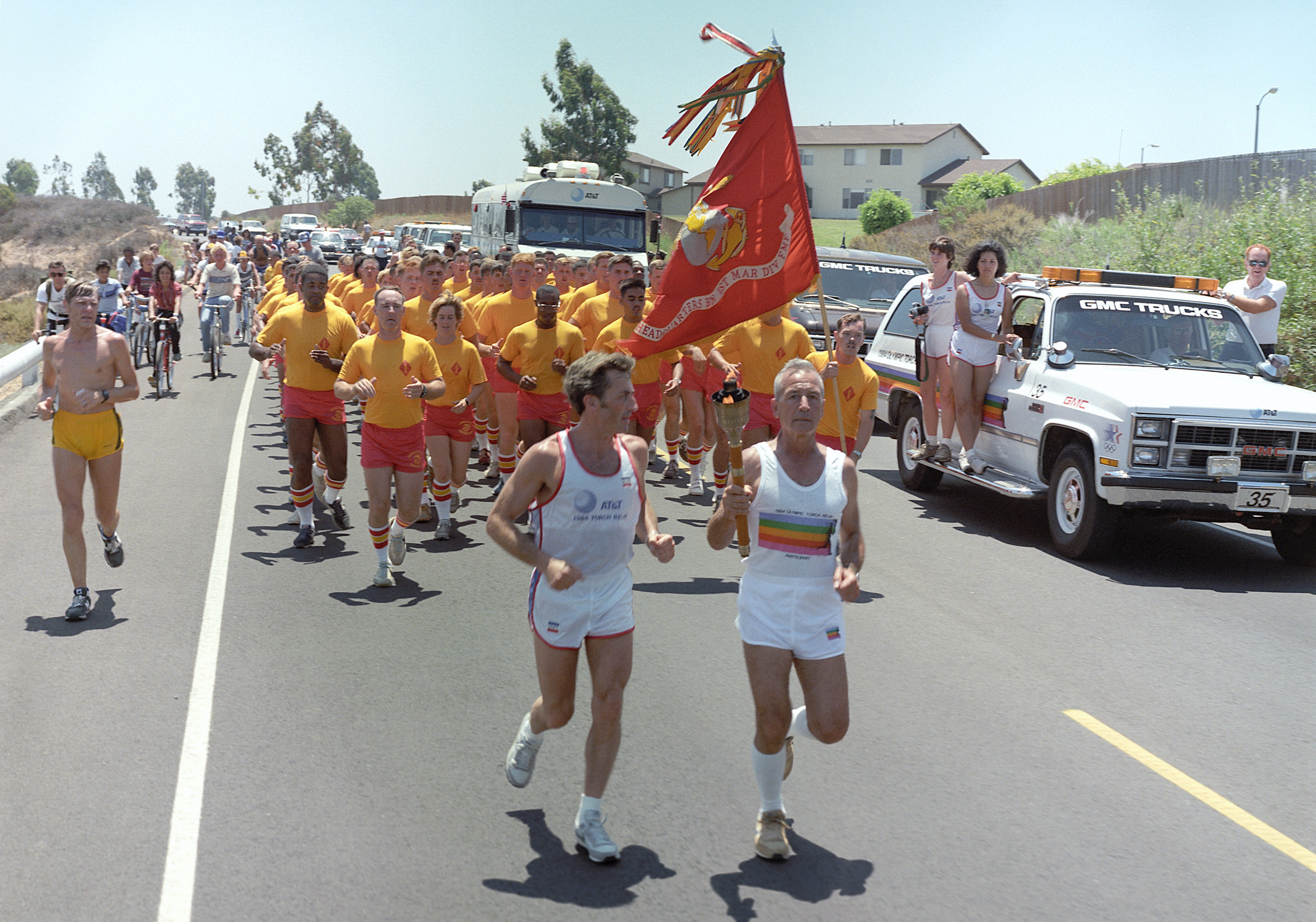
A platoon of Marines carries the torch across Marine Corps Base Camp Pendleton.

George Christie, a prominent member of the Hells Angels Motorcycle Club, carried the torch in his hometown of Ventura. O.J. Simpson carried the torch up the California Incline into Santa Monica, bringing it into the Los Angeles area. One of the only cities to be added to the relay route after it was initially announced, while many were removed due to logistical constraints and a lack of donations, was San Diego, where local residents raised over $550,000 for the Youth Legacy Kilometer program. The San Diego leg of the relay, in which the torch was carried by mayor Roger Hedgecock and Padres star Steve Garvey, was described as raising the city's spirits after the murder of 20 people in the San Ysidro McDonald's massacre a few days earlier. In order to get permission to run the torch across Marine Corps Base Camp Pendleton, organizers allowed a platoon of Marines to carry it there.

The relay culminated on July 28, with the Olympics opening ceremony at Los Angeles Memorial Coliseum. Gina Hemphill, who had been one of the first torchbearers in New York, carried the torch into the stadium and circled the track before delivering it to Rafer Johnson, who lit the cauldron.

The torchbearers, 3,636 in all, came from a wide variety of backgrounds. The 1984 relay was the first to invite nominations from the public, a system replicated in future relays. It was also the first to charge torchbearers for their participation. Anybody who could raise the entry fee would be able to sponsor one kilometer and bear a torch themselves or designate a person to do so. The Youth Legacy Kilometer program raised nearly $11 million – a third of the $30 million organizers had hoped to raise – all of which was given to charities. The YMCA received the largest proportion of the funds, amounting to around $3.9 million, while smaller amounts went to the Boys Clubs, Girls Clubs, and the Special Olympics.

In parallel with the torch relay, a group of Native American athletes held "The Longest Run", starting at the Onondaga Reservation near Syracuse, New York, on May 28, 1984, and culminating on July 19 at Whittier Narrows Recreation Area near Los Angeles, for the opening of the Jim Thorpe Memorial Pow-Wow and Native Games there. The event honored Thorpe, whose 1912 Olympic medals, stripped over an amateurism controversy, had officially been reinstated in January 1983 thirty years after his death. It was also patterned after the American Indian Movement's Longest Walk protest march of 1978.

== Route ==
(Route is approximate where sources are unclear or unavailable)

Date	Locations	Map
May 8	New York: New York City (United Nations Plaza, Central Park, Empire State Building, City Hall, Battery Park, World Trade Center, Bronx Zoo), Pelham Manor, New Rochelle, Larchmont, Mamaroneck, Rye, Port Chester Connecticut: Greenwich, Stamford, Westport, Bridgeport, West Haven (University of New Haven)	1984 Summer Olympics torch relay is located in Connecticut
May 9	Connecticut: West Haven, Old Lyme, Niantic, Waterford, New London (United States Coast Guard Academy), Mystic (Mystic Seaport), Stonington, Pawcatuck Rhode Island: Westerly, Narragansett, South Kingstown, North Kingstown, East Greenwich, Warwick, Providence, Pawtucket Massachusetts: North Attleboro	1984 Summer Olympics torch relay is located in Connecticut
May 10	Massachusetts: North Attleboro, Foxborough, Walpole, Norwood, Dedham, Boston (Massachusetts State House, Faneuil Hall, Freedom Trail, Old North Church, Government Center), Cambridge (Harvard University), Watertown, Waltham, Wayland, Sudbury, Marlborough, Auburn, Charlton Connecticut: Storrs (University of Connecticut)	1984 Summer Olympics torch relay is located in Massachusetts
May 11	Connecticut: Storrs, Manchester, East Hartford, Hartford (Connecticut State Capitol), West Hartford, Farmington, Bristol, Wolcott, Waterbury, Middlebury, Woodbury, Southbury, Newtown, Danbury New York: Brewster, Carmel, Mahopac, Baldwin Place, Shrub Oak, Mohegan Lake, Peekskill, West Point (United States Military Academy)	1984 Summer Olympics torch relay is located in Massachusetts
May 12	New York: West Point, Stony Point, Suffern New Jersey: Mahwah, Lincoln Park, Towaco, Montville, Boonton, Parsippany, Morris Plains, Morristown, Bernardsville, Bedminster, Bridgewater Township, Somerville, Hillsborough Township, Montgomery Township, Princeton, Lawrence Township (Rider College)	1984 Summer Olympics torch relay is located in New Jersey
May 13	New Jersey: Lawrence Township, Trenton Pennsylvania: Morrisville, Philadelphia (Independence Hall, Liberty Bell, Philadelphia Museum of Art), Yeadon, Chester, Marcus Hook Delaware: Wilmington (Rodney Square), Elsmere, Newark (University of Delaware) Maryland: Havre de Grace, Aberdeen, Edgewood (Aberdeen Proving Ground)	1984 Summer Olympics torch relay is located in New Jersey
May 14	Maryland: Edgewood, Baltimore (Harborplace), Annapolis, Bowie Washington, D.C. (White House, United States Capitol, Jefferson Memorial, Lincoln Memorial) Virginia: Arlington (Arlington National Cemetery), Fairfax	1984 Summer Olympics torch relay is located in Maryland
May 15	Virginia: Fairfax, Winchester West Virginia: Romney	1984 Summer Olympics torch relay is located in Maryland
May 16	West Virginia: Romney, U.S. Route 50 Maryland: U.S. Route 50 West Virginia: U.S. Route 50, Clarksburg	1984 Summer Olympics torch relay is located in West Virginia
May 17	West Virginia: Clarksburg, Shinnston, Fairmont, Morgantown Pennsylvania: Washington	1984 Summer Olympics torch relay is located in West Virginia
May 18	Pennsylvania: Washington, Upper St. Clair, Mount Lebanon, Dormont, Pittsburgh (Schenley Park, University of Pittsburgh, Market Square, Point State Park), Sewickley, Ellwood City, New Castle Ohio: Youngstown, Canfield, Berlin Lake	1984 Summer Olympics torch relay is located in West Virginia
May 19	Ohio: Berlin Lake, Akron, Fairlawn, Bedford, Maple Heights, Shaker Heights, Cleveland Heights, East Cleveland, Cleveland, Lakewood, Bay Village	1984 Summer Olympics torch relay is located in Ohio
May 20	Ohio: Bay Village, Sheffield Lake, Sandusky, Port Clinton, Toledo Michigan: Monroe	1984 Summer Olympics torch relay is located in Ohio
May 21	Michigan: Monroe, Detroit (Hart Plaza, Grand Circus Park), Pontiac, Flint (Sarvis Center)	1984 Summer Olympics torch relay is located in Michigan
May 22	Michigan: Flint, Owosso, East Lansing (Michigan State University), Lansing (Michigan State Capitol), Potterville, Charlotte, Bellevue, Battle Creek (Battle Creek Y Center)	1984 Summer Olympics torch relay is located in Michigan
May 23	Michigan: Battle Creek, Athens, Leonidas, Sturgis, White Pigeon, Mottville, Edwardsburg, Niles, Three Oaks, New Buffalo Indiana: Michigan City, Gary (Fifth Avenue and Burr Street)	1984 Summer Olympics torch relay is located in Michigan
May 24	Indiana: Gary, Hammond, East Chicago, Whiting, Hammond Illinois: Chicago (Daley Plaza), Harvey, South Holland, Calumet City Indiana: Hammond, Highland, Schererville, St. John, Lake Village	1984 Summer Olympics torch relay is located in Indiana
May 25	Indiana: Lake Village, Kentland, Gravel Hill, West Lafayette (Purdue University), Lafayette, Elizaville	1984 Summer Olympics torch relay is located in Indiana
May 26	Indiana: Elizaville, Sheridan, Indianapolis (Hoosier Dome), Greenwood, Columbus, Reddington, Seymour, Uniontown	1984 Summer Olympics torch relay is located in Indiana
May 27	Indiana: Uniontown, Crothersville, Scottsburg, Jeffersonville Kentucky: Louisville (Clark Memorial Bridge, Kentucky Center for the Arts), Shelbyville, Frankfort (Kentucky Governor's Mansion), Versailles, Lexington (Keeneland Race Course)	1984 Summer Olympics torch relay is located in Kentucky
May 28	Kentucky: Lexington, Richmond, Berea (Berea College), Lexington, London, Corbin, Barbourville, Pineville (Pine Mountain State Resort Park)	1984 Summer Olympics torch relay is located in Kentucky
May 29	Kentucky: Pine Mountain, Middlesboro, Cumberland Gap Tennessee: Cumberland Gap, La Follette, Knoxville (University of Tennessee), Gatlinburg (Sugarlands Visitor Center)	1984 Summer Olympics torch relay is located in Tennessee
May 30	Tennessee: Gatlinburg, Great Smoky Mountains National Park North Carolina: Great Smoky Mountains National Park, Cherokee, Bryson City, Andrews, Murphy Georgia: Blairsville	1984 Summer Olympics torch relay is located in Tennessee
May 31	Georgia: Blairsville, Dahlonega, Dawsonville, Cumming, Alpharetta, Roswell, Sandy Springs, Atlanta (Chastain Park, Georgia Governor's Mansion, Colony Square), Mableton	1984 Summer Olympics torch relay is located in Tennessee
June 1	Georgia: Mableton, Austell, Douglasville, Villa Rica, Temple, Bremen, Tallapoosa Alabama: Heflin, Oxford, Lincoln, Pell City, Leeds	1984 Summer Olympics torch relay is located in Tennessee
June 2	Alabama: Leeds, Birmingham, Adamsville, Graysville, Sumiton, Jasper, Carbon Hill, Winfield, Hamilton Mississippi: Fulton, Tupelo (U.S. Route 78 at Auburn Road)	1984 Summer Olympics torch relay is located in Tennessee
June 3	Mississippi: Tupelo, Sherman, Blue Springs, New Albany, Myrtle, Hickory Flat, Holly Springs Tennessee: Memphis (Beale Street) Arkansas: West Memphis, Jericho, Turrell (Turrell High School)	1984 Summer Olympics torch relay is located in Tennessee
June 4	Arkansas: Turrell, Wilson, Luxora, Blytheville Missouri: Steele, Portageville, Sikeston	1984 Summer Olympics torch relay is located in Missouri
June 5	Missouri: Sikeston, Benton, Kelso, Scott City, Cape Girardeau, Jackson, Old Appleton, Sainte Genevieve, Festus (border with Crystal City)	1984 Summer Olympics torch relay is located in Missouri
June 6	Missouri: Crystal City, Herculaneum, Arnold, St. Louis (Gateway Arch, Forest Park, Francis Olympic Field), Ladue, Ballwin, Ellisville, Gray Summit, Union, Beaufort, Gerald, Rosebud, Drake, Mount Sterling	1984 Summer Olympics torch relay is located in Missouri
June 7	Missouri: Mount Sterling, Linn, Loose Creek, Jefferson City (Missouri State Capitol), St. Martins, California, Tipton, Syracuse, Sedalia, Warrensburg	1984 Summer Olympics torch relay is located in Missouri
June 8	Missouri: Warrensburg, Lee's Summit, Raytown, Kansas City (Country Club Plaza, Crown Center) Kansas: Kansas City, Shawnee, Lawrence	1984 Summer Olympics torch relay is located in Kansas
June 9	Kansas: Lawrence, Topeka (Kansas State Capitol), Carbondale, Lyndon, Burlington, Yates Center, Buffalo, Altoona	1984 Summer Olympics torch relay is located in Kansas
June 10	Kansas: Altoona, Neodesha, Independence, Caney Oklahoma: Dewey, Bartlesville, Tulsa, Jenks, Sapulpa	1984 Summer Olympics torch relay is located in Oklahoma
June 11	Oklahoma: Sapulpa, Bristow, Stroud, Chandler, Arcadia, Edmond, Oklahoma City, Norman (University of Oklahoma, Memorial Stadium)	1984 Summer Olympics torch relay is located in Oklahoma
June 12	Oklahoma: Norman, Noble, Purcell, Wayne, Paoli, Pauls Valley, Wynnewood, Davis, Sulphur, Dickson, Mannsville, Madill, Willis (Lake Texoma Lodge)	1984 Summer Olympics torch relay is located in Oklahoma
June 13	Oklahoma: Willis Texas: Sherwood Shores, Whitesboro, Collinsville, Tioga, Pilot Point, Aubrey, Cross Roads, Frisco, Dallas, Grand Prairie	1984 Summer Olympics torch relay is located in Texas
June 14	Texas: Grand Prairie, Arlington, Fort Worth, Azle, Reno, Springtown, Jacksboro, Jermyn, Loving, Olney	1984 Summer Olympics torch relay is located in Texas
June 15	Texas: Olney, Megargel, Westover, Seymour, Red Springs, Vera, Benjamin, Guthrie, Dickens	1984 Summer Olympics torch relay is located in Texas
June 16	Texas: Dickens, Crosbyton, Lubbock, Littlefield	1984 Summer Olympics torch relay is located in Texas
June 17	Texas: Littlefield, Farwell New Mexico: Texico, Clovis, Melrose, Fort Sumner	1984 Summer Olympics torch relay is located in New Mexico
June 18	New Mexico: Fort Sumner, Vaughn, Encino, Willard, Estancia	1984 Summer Olympics torch relay is located in New Mexico
June 19	New Mexico: Estancia, Moriarty, Tijeras, Albuquerque, Bernalillo, La Bajada	1984 Summer Olympics torch relay is located in New Mexico
June 20	New Mexico: La Bajada, Santa Fe, Española, Ojo Caliente, Tres Piedras Colorado: Antonito	1984 Summer Olympics torch relay is located in New Mexico
June 21	Colorado: Antonito, La Jara, Alamosa, Mosca, Hooper, Moffat, Mineral Hot Springs, Villa Grove, Poncha Springs, Nathrop, Johnson Village	1984 Summer Olympics torch relay is located in Colorado
June 22	Colorado: Johnson Village, Antero Junction, Hartsel, Lake George, Florissant, Divide, Woodland Park, Cascade, Manitou Springs, Colorado Springs (United States Olympic Training Center, United States Air Force Academy)	1984 Summer Olympics torch relay is located in Colorado
June 23	Colorado: Colorado Springs, Franktown, Parker, Denver (Colorado State Capitol, Civic Center, 16th Street Mall), Golden	1984 Summer Olympics torch relay is located in Colorado
June 24	Colorado: Golden, Idaho Springs, Empire, Berthoud Pass, Winter Park, Fraser, Tabernash, Granby, Hot Sulphur Springs, Kremmling	1984 Summer Olympics torch relay is located in Colorado
June 25	Colorado: Kremmling, Steamboat Springs, Milner, Hayden, Craig	1984 Summer Olympics torch relay is located in Colorado
June 26	Colorado: Craig, Maybell, Elk Springs, Blue Mountain, Dinosaur Utah: Jensen, Vernal (Uintah High School)	1984 Summer Olympics torch relay is located in Utah
June 27	Utah: Vernal, Gusher, Roosevelt, Myton, Duchesne, Fruitland, Heber City	1984 Summer Olympics torch relay is located in Utah
June 28	Utah: Heber City, Park City, Snyderville, Kimball Junction, Salt Lake City (Salt Lake Temple, Utah State Capitol), North Salt Lake, Bountiful, Centerville, Farmington, Fruit Heights, Kaysville, Layton, South Weber, Uintah, South Ogden, Washington Terrace, Ogden, North Ogden, Pleasant View, Willard, Perry, Brigham City, Bear River City, Elwood, Tremonton	1984 Summer Olympics torch relay is located in Utah
June 29	Utah: Tremonton, Garland, Snowville Idaho: Burley, Murtaugh	1984 Summer Olympics torch relay is located in Idaho
June 30	Idaho: Murtaugh, Hansen, Kimberly, Twin Falls, Filer, Hagerman, Bliss, Glenns Ferry, Mountain Home	1984 Summer Olympics torch relay is located in Idaho
July 1	Idaho: Mountain Home, Boise (Idaho State Capitol), Meridian, Nampa, Caldwell Oregon: Ontario, Farewell Bend State Recreation Area	1984 Summer Olympics torch relay is located in Idaho
July 2	Oregon: Farewell Bend, Baker City, La Grande, Meacham, Umatilla Indian Reservation (Deadman Pass)	1984 Summer Olympics torch relay is located in Idaho
July 3	Oregon: Deadman Pass, Pendleton, Stanfield, Hermiston, Umatilla Washington: Kennewick, Pasco, Eltopia, Mesa	1984 Summer Olympics torch relay is located in Washington (state)
July 4	Washington: Mesa, Othello, Moses Lake, Ephrata, Quincy, Wenatchee, Cashmere	1984 Summer Olympics torch relay is located in Washington (state)
July 5	Washington: Cashmere, Leavenworth, Skykomish, Stevens Pass, Bothell, Lake Forest Park	1984 Summer Olympics torch relay is located in Washington (state)
July 6	Washington: Lake Forest Park, Seattle, Fife, Tacoma Nisqually Reservation, Olympia (Washington State Capitol), Tenino, Grand Mound, Centralia	1984 Summer Olympics torch relay is located in Washington (state)
July 7	Washington: Centralia, Chehalis, Winlock, Vader, Castle Rock, Kelso, Longview Oregon: Rainier, St. Helens, Portland, Milwaukie, Gladstone, Oregon City (Clackamette Park)	1984 Summer Olympics torch relay is located in Oregon
July 8	Oregon: Oregon City, Canby, Barlow, Hubbard, Woodburn, Brooks, Salem (Oregon State Capitol), Independence, Corvallis, Monroe, Junction City, Eugene	1984 Summer Olympics torch relay is located in Oregon
July 9	Oregon: Eugene, Glenwood, Springfield, Oakridge, Crescent Lake Junction	1984 Summer Olympics torch relay is located in Oregon
July 10	Oregon: Crescent Lake Junction, Chemult, Chiloquin, Klamath Falls (Oregon Institute of Technology)	1984 Summer Olympics torch relay is located in Oregon
July 11	Oregon: Klamath Falls, Merrill California: Tulelake, Newell, Adin	1984 Summer Olympics torch relay is located in Northern California
July 12	California: Adin, Stones Landing, Spaulding, Janesville, Susanville, Honey Lake	1984 Summer Olympics torch relay is located in Northern California
July 13	California: Honey Lake, Doyle, Hallelujah Junction Nevada: Reno, Carson City, Lake Tahoe–Nevada State Park (Spooner Lake Dam)	1984 Summer Olympics torch relay is located in Northern California
July 14	Nevada: Spooner Lake, Stateline California: South Lake Tahoe, Jackson	1984 Summer Olympics torch relay is located in Northern California
July 15	California: Jackson, Sacramento, Davis, Winters, Napa, Vallejo, Novato (Hamilton Army Airfield)	1984 Summer Olympics torch relay is located in San Francisco Bay Area
July 16	California: Novato, Marinwood, Terra Linda, San Rafael, Larkspur, Corte Madera, Mill Valley, Sausalito, San Francisco (Golden Gate Bridge, The Presidio, Golden Gate Park, City Hall, San Francisco–Oakland Bay Bridge), Oakland, San Leandro, Hayward (San Mateo–Hayward Bridge), Foster City, San Mateo, Redwood City, Atherton, Menlo Park, Palo Alto (Stanford University), Mountain View, Sunnyvale, Santa Clara (Santa Clara University)	1984 Summer Olympics torch relay is located in San Francisco Bay Area
July 17	California: Santa Clara, San Jose, Morgan Hill, Gilroy, Castroville, Watsonville, Pajaro, Las Lomas, Salinas, Fort Ord, Del Rey Oaks, Seaside, Monterey, Pacific Grove, Carmel-by-the-Sea	1984 Summer Olympics torch relay is located in Northern California
July 18	California: Carmel, Carmel Valley, Greenfield, King City, San Ardo, Bradley, San Miguel, Paso Robles, Templeton, Atascadero, Santa Margarita	1984 Summer Olympics torch relay is located in Northern California
July 19	California: Santa Margarita, San Luis Obispo, Shell Beach, Pismo Beach, Grover Beach, Arroyo Grande, Nipomo, Santa Maria, Vandenberg Air Force Base, Lompoc, Goleta, Isla Vista (University of California, Santa Barbara, Olympic Village)	1984 Summer Olympics torch relay is located in southern California
July 20	California: Isla Vista, Goleta, Carpinteria, Santa Barbara, Ventura, Port Hueneme, Oxnard, Point Mugu, Malibu (Pepperdine University)	1984 Summer Olympics torch relay is located in southern California
July 21	California: Malibu, Santa Monica (Santa Monica Pier), Los Angeles (Brentwood, Los Angeles, Westwood, Century City), Beverly Hills, Los Angeles (Hollywood), Sherman Oaks, Van Nuys, Encino, Woodland Hills, Canoga Park	1984 Summer Olympics torch relay is located in the Los Angeles metropolitan area
July 22	California: Canoga Park, Northridge, Panorama City, North Hollywood, Burbank, Glendale, Pasadena, Temple City, El Monte, Alhambra, Monterey Park, East Los Angeles, Whittier, West Covina, San Dimas	1984 Summer Olympics torch relay is located in the Los Angeles metropolitan area
July 23	California: San Dimas, La Verne, Pomona, Montclair, Claremont, Upland, Ontario, Mira Loma, Norco, Corona, Lake Elsinore, Wildomar, Murrieta, Escondido	1984 Summer Olympics torch relay is located in the Los Angeles metropolitan area
July 24	California: Escondido, San Diego (Rancho Bernardo), Poway, San Diego, Miramar, La Mesa, central San Diego, Linda Vista, National City, Chula Vista, La Jolla	1984 Summer Olympics torch relay is located in southern California
July 25	California: La Jolla, Del Mar, Oceanside, Camp Pendleton, San Clemente, San Juan Capistrano, Laguna Niguel, Dana Point, South Laguna, Laguna Beach, Corona del Mar, Newport Beach, Irvine, Costa Mesa	1984 Summer Olympics torch relay is located in southern California
July 26	California: Costa Mesa, Santa Ana, Orange, Anaheim, Cypress, Buena Park (Independence Hall at Knott's Berry Farm), Fullerton, La Mirada, Norwalk, Santa Fe Springs, Downey, Paramount, Compton, Long Beach (Long Beach Shoreline Marina)	1984 Summer Olympics torch relay is located in the Los Angeles metropolitan area
July 27	California: Long Beach, Carson, Torrance, Rancho Palos Verdes, Redondo Beach, Hermosa Beach, Manhattan Beach, Playa del Rey, Marina del Rey, Los Angeles (Koreatown, Silver Lake, Hollywood, Crenshaw Boulevard and 71st Street)	1984 Summer Olympics torch relay is located in the Los Angeles metropolitan area
July 28	California: Los Angeles, Inglewood, Los Angeles (Watts), Gardena, Hawthorne, Los Angeles (Memorial Coliseum, opening ceremony)	1984 Summer Olympics torch relay is located in the Los Angeles metropolitan area

== Legacy ==
The 1984 torch relay was the first to last longer than two months, the first to be substantially funded by corporate sponsorships, and the first to visit all the major cities of the host country rather than traveling directly to the host city. This model has been followed by most Olympic torch relays that have occurred since. No Summer Olympics torch relay since 1992 has lasted for less than two months.

The relay, and the gathering of millions of people who watched as it was carried through their communities, was widely regarded as bolstering national pride in the United States. In his nomination speech at the 1984 Republican National Convention, President Ronald Reagan hailed the relay as a patriotic triumph and argued that it demonstrated that his administration was succeeding in its efforts to revitalize America. At the end of the year, Lance Morrow of Time magazine reflected on the relay as part of a revival of patriotic sentiment during 1984 after the difficulties associated with the 1970s. According to Morrow, Americans saw the torchbearers as running "away from Jimmy Carter's 'malaise,' away from gas shortages and hostage crises and a sense of American impotence and failure and limitation and passivity, away from dishonored Presidents and a lost war. Away from what had become an American inferiority complex. Away from descendant history. Running away from the past, into the future. Or away from the bad past anyway, the recent, misbegotten past, and into a better past, all mythy and sweetly vigorous, into that America where the future was full of endless possibility."

While the torch relay was the first major cross-country event of its kind, it was followed by, and likely helped to inspire, similar events. Hands Across America, which aimed to raise money for America's hungry and homeless, and the Great Peace March, a protest for nuclear disarmament, were staged in 1986. Both events crossed the nation between New York and Los Angeles, with the continuity of the journey from coast to coast being a significant part of each, and both sought to cover the logistical costs of their events with multi-million-dollar contributions from corporate sponsors.
