= 1980 Summer Olympics opening ceremony =

- Part of 1980 Summer Olympics
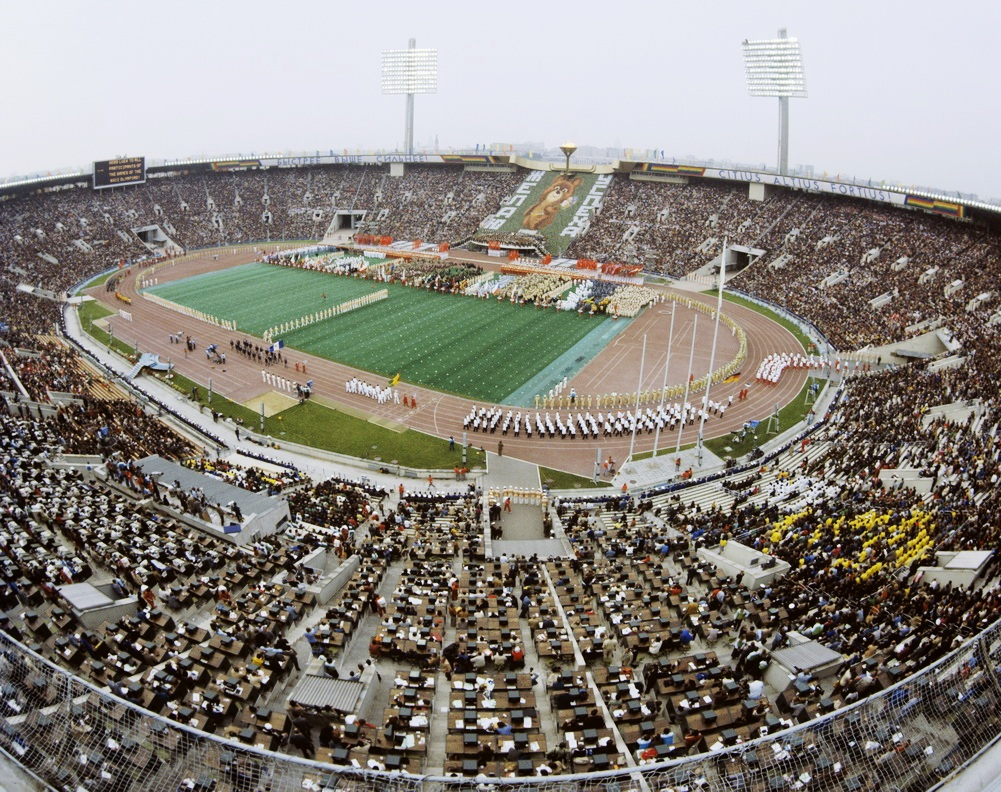
- The Opening Ceremony at the Central Lenin Stadium
- Date: 19 July 1980; 46 years ago
- Time: 15:46 – 17:00 MSK (UTC+3)
- Venue: Central Lenin Stadium
- Location: Moscow, Russian SFSR, USSR; 55°42′56″N 37°33′5″E
- Filmed by: Central Television of the USSR

The Opening Ceremony of the 1980 Summer Olympics was the official opening ceremony held in the afternoon at 16:00 Moscow Time (UTC+3) on 19 July 1980 in the Grand Arena of the Central Lenin Stadium. It was attended by the Chairman of the Presidium of the Supreme Soviet of the USSR, Leonid Brezhnev, and IOC President Lord Killanin.

Due to changes made to the Olympic charter in 1979, it became mandatory for the organizing country to demonstrate various elements of its culture during the opening and closing ceremonies. While the Montréal ceremonies were simpler and more austere, Moscow's opening ceremony started a trend which changed the format of the ceremonies. Prior to 1976, Olympic opening ceremonies were truly "ceremonial", consisting of just the parade of nations and rituals associated with the official opening of the Games. The USSR authorities wanted to put on a spectacle to impress the rest of the world, so highly produced artistic performances were included after the protocolar elements finished. Since then, subsequent opening ceremonies had a high level artistic programs, and it is now seen as an important aspect of the Games.

== Sequence of events ==
- Countdown of Kremlin Clock chimes at 16:00 Moscow Time.
- Fanfare by the Herald Trumpeters: "Moscow Fanfare" by Soviet musician and composer A. Golovin.
- Introduction of the Soviet leader, Leonid Brezhnev.
- Playing of the national anthem of the Soviet Union. The card stunt displayed the coat of arms of the USSR.
- Chariots of Fire: Parade of Greek chariots in the stadium, followed by red flags with the emblem of the Moscow Olympics on them. The song "Stadium of my Dreams" (Russian: Стадион моей мечты, Stadion moyey mechti) was heard.
- Parade of nations. Greece enters first, the Soviet Union, as a host nation, last, per tradition. Other delegations enter in Cyrillic alphabetical order
- Welcoming remarks by the chairman of the Moscow Olympic Organizing Committee "OCOG-80", Ignati Novikov.
- Speech by the President of the International Olympic Committee, Lord Killanin, his final Olympic Opening Ceremony speech.
- Soviet leader Leonid Brezhnev opened the Olympic Games.
- Handover of the Olympic flag by young athletes Stéphane Préfontaine and Sandra Henderson (1976 Summer Olympic Games last torchbearers) representing the Montreal City. Although the mayor, Jean Drapeau, wished to attend, the US-led boycott was supported by the Canadian government which turned the trip to Moscow impossible. The flag was received by IOC President Killanin, who passed it to the First Secretary of the Moscow gorkom of the CPSU, Viktor Grishin.

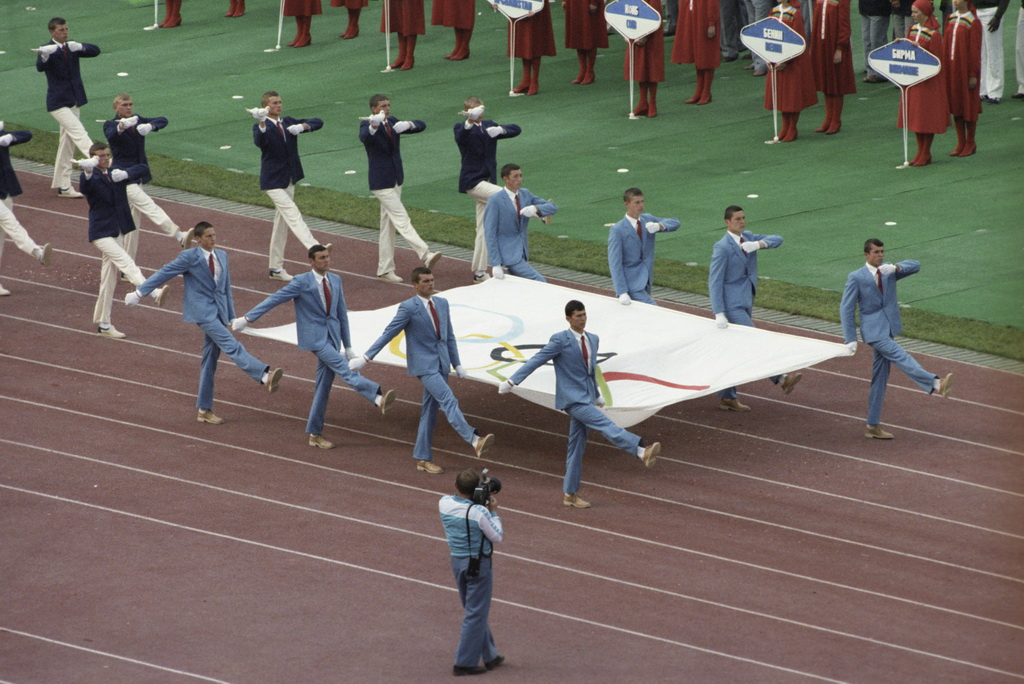
Olympic Flag in the stadium. RIAN photo.

- Entry of the Olympic Flag. The flag was carried by eight Masters of Sports of the USSR accompanied by another 22 representing the Summer Games held until Moscow. The flag was raised to the Olympic Anthem, sung in Russian.
- Entrance of the Olympic flame.
  - The flame was carried into the stadium by triple jumper Viktor Saneyev.
  - The last runner was Sergei Belov, a member of the Soviet Union national basketball team. Belov ascended to the cauldron through a path of cards created by the card stunt.
- Olympic Oath, taken by gymnast Nikolai Andrianov.
- Judges' Oath, taken by wrestling referee Alexander Medved.
- Exit of the Athletes

=== Cultural Segment ===
- Salyut 6 crew Leonid Popov and Valery Ryumin sent their greetings to the Olympians and wished good luck to all in a live sound communication between the station and the Central Lenin Stadium. Pictures of them appeared on the stadium's scoreboard and their voices were broadcast at the stadium via the loud speakers.

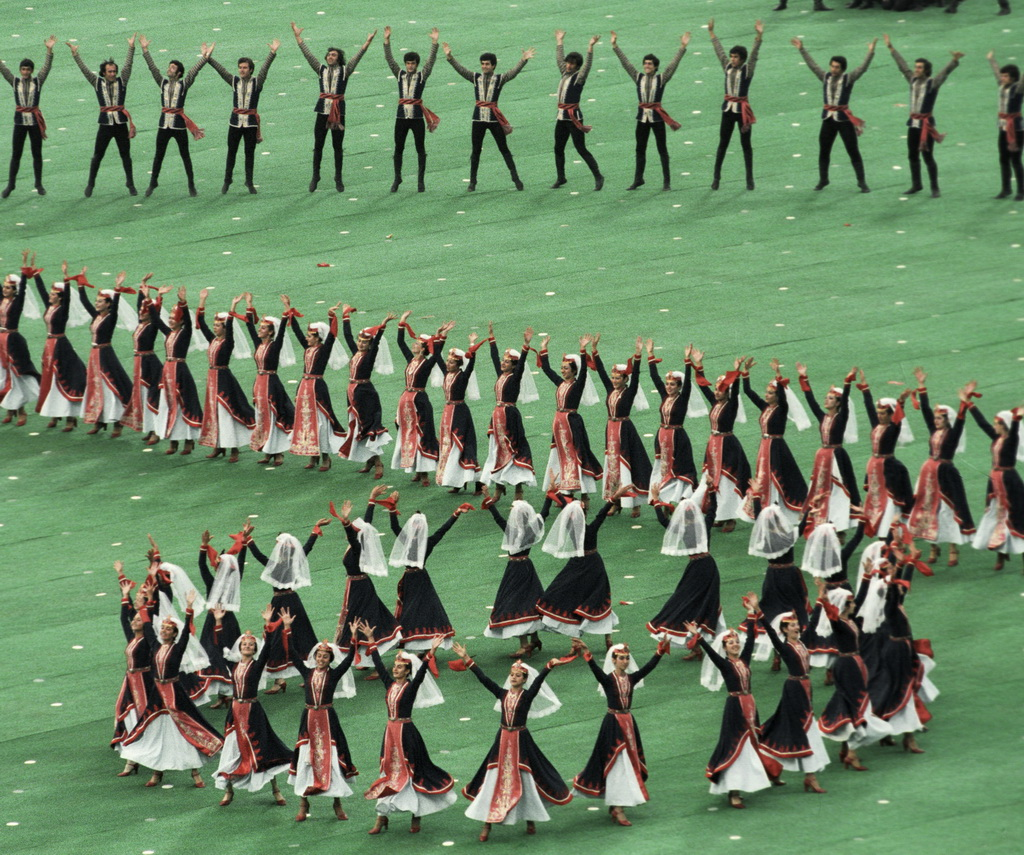
Friendship of the Peoples dance suite. RIAN photo.

After the Salyut 6 crew greetings the cultural performances started under the theme of the Friendship of the Peoples.

  - Friendship of the Peoples: A dance suite featuring the traditional dances of the 15 Soviet republics. The performers entered in this order: Belarus, Kazakhstan, Turkmenistan, Tajikistan, Kyrgyzstan, Estonia, Latvia, Lithuania, Azerbaijan, Armenia, Georgia, Ukraine, Uzbekistan, Moldova, and Russia. The Russian finale also featured troikas and a final performance by the performers from all the republics (to the tune of the Russian folk song Kalinka). The song "Wide Is My Motherland" (Широка страна моя родная, from the movie Circus) was also heard at the beginning and end of the suite.
  - Gymnasts' performance, including ribbon, ball and pommel horse displays.
  - Misha: Scores of performers donned as Misha, the Moscow Olympics mascot, dance in the stadium field.
  - Children's performance, beginning with a boys' pole horse performance, followed by a girls' doll performance. Gymnastic maneuvers were done by the performance in each part of the segment, which ended with the boys and girls mixed together, forming groups of "troikas", then leaving the scene.
  - Performance of acrobats and trampoline gymnastics display.

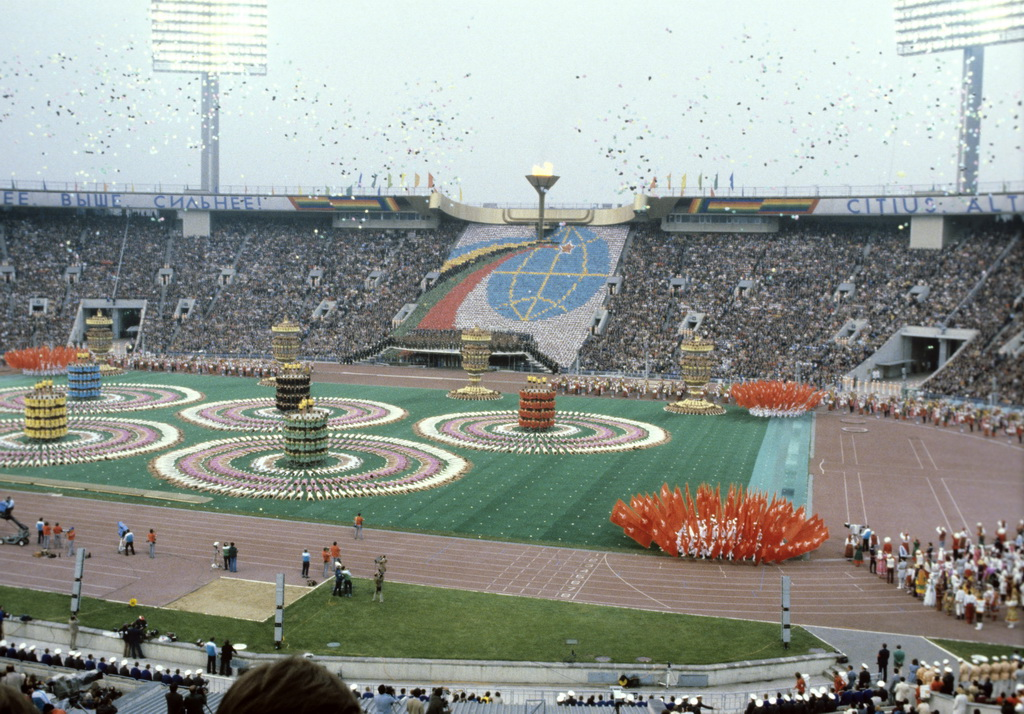
Five pillars - five Olympic Rings. RIAN photo.

  - Appearance of five pillars in the configuration of the Olympic Rings. Each pillar held performers forming "human vases". Eugen Doga's famous wedding waltz from the 1978 movie A Hunting Accident could be heard throughout this segment. The same music would later be used in the finale of the opening ceremonies of the 1986 Goodwill Games and during the opening ceremony of the 2014 Winter Olympics in Sochi.
  - Finale: Performers from throughout the opening ceremony re-entered the stadium as the Moscow Olympics' theme song "Moscow Gives the Start" (Старт даёт Москва, Start dayot Moskva) was sung, and would later exit again. Balloons were released. The card stunt at this time was showing the Moscow 1980 Olympic logo.
- Both the opening and closing ceremonies were shown in Yuri Ozerov's 1981 film O, Sport, You - the Peace! (Russian: О спорт, ты - мир!).

== Anthems ==
- National Anthem of the Soviet Union
- Red Army Choir and the Bolshoi Theater Chorus - Olympic Hymn
