= 1980 Summer Olympics boycott =

International protest against the Soviet invasion of Afghanistan

Boycotting countries: Adhered to the US-led boycott Competed under IOC flag or under its own NOC flag Withdrew for other reasons Not invited by the IOC

The United States led a boycott of the 1980 Summer Olympics, held in Moscow, to protest against the Soviet invasion of Afghanistan. More than 60 countries joined the boycott to varying degrees, affecting athletes, fans, and international relations. The absence of so many competitors changed the outcomes of some events, led to alternative competitions, and provoked a retaliatory boycott by the Soviet Union and its allies of the 1984 Summer Olympics in Los Angeles.

== Background ==
The Western governments first considered boycotting the Moscow 1980 Summer Olympics after the Soviet invasion of Afghanistan, discussing it at a December 20, 1979, NATO meeting. Earlier in the mid-1970s, human rights groups had proposed Olympic boycotts to pressure the Soviet Union over human rights violations, but interest was limited. The idea gained traction when Soviet dissident Andrei Sakharov called for a boycott in early January 1980. President Jimmy Carter joined the appeal, setting a deadline for the Soviet withdrawal or warning of potential consequences, including a U.S.-led Olympic boycott. Canada also announced it would join the boycott if Soviet forces did not leave Afghanistan by February 20, 1980. Carter proposed moving the Olympics to Greece permanently to avoid politicization, but the IOC rejected the idea.

== Geopolitical context ==
The boycott of the 1980 Summer Olympics occurred against the background of heightened Cold War tensions following the Soviet invasion of Afghanistan in December 1979. The United States government stated that participation in the Moscow Games conflicted with international opposition to the Soviet military intervention. President Jimmy Carter linked the question of Olympic participation to the U.S. response to the invasion of Afghanistan.

== Decision to boycott ==
In January 1980, President Carter announced that the United States would not participate in the Moscow Olympics unless Soviet forces withdrew from Afghanistan. The announcement prompted debate within the U.S. government, Congress, and the United States Olympic Committee, particularly regarding the consequences for athletes who had qualified for the Games.

The United States subsequently encouraged allied and non-aligned countries to support the boycott. Some governments agreed to withdraw their teams, while others declined or adopted partial measures, resulting in varying levels of participation at the Games. As part of these efforts, former heavyweight boxing champion Muhammad Ali undertook diplomatic visits to several African countries at the request of the Carter administration to advocate support for the boycott.

== International response ==
=== Soviet reaction and negotiation attempts ===
The Soviet government rejected calls to cancel or relocate the Games and continued preparations for the Moscow Olympics. Soviet officials described the boycott as political interference in sport and responded through diplomatic channels and state media.

Diplomatic discussions involving the United States, the International Olympic Committee (IOC), and other governments took place in the months preceding the Games, but these did not result in a change to the U.S. decision to boycott.

=== IOC reaction ===
The International Olympic Committee opposed the boycott, maintaining that the Olympic Games should remain independent of political disputes and expressing concern about the impact on athletes. The IOC did not formally sanction either participating or boycotting nations; however, it permitted athletes from some boycotting countries to compete under the Olympic flag rather than their national flags, subject to decisions made by individual national Olympic committees.

== Impact on athletes and on the Games ==
The boycott had a major impact on athletes, many of whom had trained their entire lives for the Olympics. Some participated in alternative events such as the Liberty Bell Classic, which could not match the prestige of the actual Olympics. The absence of top competitors changed event outcomes and the overall competition landscape.

Some athletes competed despite their governments' official stance, often under neutral flags. These examples show how personal ambition sometimes clashed with political pressure, resulting in a complex and uneven participation landscape. President of the IOC Lord Killanin permitted National Olympic Committee (NOC)-qualified athletes to compete at the Games without their national flags or anthems (which allowed NOCs to send athletes in a non-national context), but this did not allow other individuals lacking NOC sanction to participate in the Games, as this was perceived by the IOC as a potential weakening of their authority. Four competitors (including one athlete) from New Zealand competed independently and marched under their NOC flag because the government officially supported the boycott. The athletes of 16 countries did not fly their national flags. Instead, Olympic flags were raised, and the Olympic Anthem replaced their national anthems at the medal ceremonies. There was one awards ceremony where three Olympic flags were raised, that being the men's individual pursuit in cycling.

At the opening ceremony's Parade of Nations, the 16 partially boycotting countries sent only a flag-bearer to march after the placard-bearer, without the rest of the delegation following the flag-bearer.

Traditionally, the mayor of the previous host city (Montreal, Canada) hands over the Olympic flag, but Montreal Mayor Jean Drapeau was prevented from attending due to the boycott. Sandra Henderson and Stéphane Préfontaine, the final torchbearers at the previous games, participated in his place.

Closing ceremony protocol rules dictated that the flag of the next host should be raised, but the United States "strongly objected" to the IOC's plans to enforce this rule. During the 83rd IOC Session just before the Games, IOC Director Monique Berlioux discovered a "loophole" where the French and English versions of the rules differed; one version stated to use the flag of the "country of the organizing city," while the other stated to use the flag of the "organizing city." Berlioux as well as Los Angeles Olympic Organizing Committee head Peter Ueberroth agreed to use the Los Angeles city flag instead. The Olympic hymn was played in place of the United States national anthem.

The Antwerp flag was received by an IOC member from the United States instead of the mayor of Los Angeles, Tom Bradley; there was no handover to Los Angeles ceremony at the closing.

Many athletes who had trained their entire lives were deeply affected by the boycott. Swimmer Jesse Vassallo reflected on the missed opportunity, recalling a conversation with President Jimmy Carter: "How would you have done in Moscow?" Vassallo answered, "I would have won two golds and a silver." He remembered Carter's pained reaction, highlighting the personal frustration of athletes sidelined for political reasons.

At least five national teams participated at the Games under the Olympic flag rather than their respective national or NOC flags, as doing the latter would have denoted that their participation was officially sanctioned by their respective nations:

- Australia
- Andorra
- Denmark
- Ireland
- Puerto Rico

== Legacy of the boycott ==
While the political impact of the boycott was limited, it left a lasting impression on athletes and international sport. Many athletes expressed frustration and disappointment, and the decision is often debated as a controversial political move.

In April 1981, a Federal District court in Manhattan approved the settlement of two suits involving more than 9,000 Americans who were seeking refunds of payments they had made for trips to the Olympics that were canceled in wake of the boycott.

When the boycott was first announced, tour deposits of over 10 million dollars were refunded by the Russian Travel Bureau, the only agency authorized to book American tours during the Olympics. Although the Soviet Union kept about $7.2 million collected by the Bureau, they had agreed to set aside $1.8 million as credits to be paid back over five years.

Under the April 1981 settlement the remunerations were increased: Americans who had canceled their trips before 1 March 1980 were reimbursed a total 85 percent of their costs, while those who had canceled after that date were reimbursed 63 percent.

== Non-participating countries ==
Sixty-eight National Olympic Committees that were invited to the 1980 Summer Olympics, plus Qatar, did not participate for various reasons, including support for the boycott and economic reasons (Qatar's National Olympic Committee was recognized in February of that year, but not in time to assemble a delegation to be sent).

Boxer Muhammad Ali traveled to Tanzania, Nigeria, and Senegal to unsuccessfully convince their leaders to join the boycott. He did, however, successfully convince the Kenyan government to do so.

Many countries ultimately joined the U.S. in a full boycott of the Games. These included Japan and West Germany, where Chancellor Schmidt was able to convince the West German Olympic Committee to support the boycott. China, the Philippines, Chile, Argentina and Norway also boycotted the Games entirely. Taiwan refused to participate as a result of the 1979 Nagoya Resolution, in which the People's Republic of China agreed to participate in IOC activities if Taiwan was referred to as "Chinese Taipei NOC". However, the Sino-Soviet split during that time led China to refuse sending a delegation to the 1980 Summer Olympics as well.

Some of these countries competed at the alternative "Liberty Bell Classic" or Olympic Boycott Games held in Philadelphia that same year. Israel joined the boycott to protest Soviet military aggression, but also because of the poor relations between the two countries. Both nations did not maintain diplomatic relations and often communicated through third countries.

The governments of the United Kingdom, France, and Australia supported the boycott, but left any final decision over the participation of their country's athletes to their respective NOCs and the decision of their individual athletes. The United Kingdom and France sent a much smaller athletic delegation than would have originally been possible. The British associations that governed equestrian sports, hockey, shooting and yachting completely boycotted the 1980 Summer Olympics.

Spain, Italy, Sweden, Iceland and Finland, although the latter under a heavy Russian influence at the time, were other principal nations representing western Europe at the Games. Of these, Spain and Italy participated under a neutral flag with the Olympic anthem playing in any ceremony. Italian athletes serving in its military corps could not attend the Games, however, because of the national government's official support of the boycott. Many events were affected by the loss of participants, and some US-born athletes who were citizens of other countries, such as Italy and Australia, did compete in Moscow.

A firm enemy of the United States under Ayatollah Khomeini's new theocracy, Iran also boycotted the Moscow Games after Khomeini joined the condemnation by the United Nations and the Organisation of Islamic Cooperation of the invasion of Afghanistan. Independently of the United States, the Islamic Conference urged a boycott of Moscow after the invasion; the Ayatollah meanwhile accused Moscow of arming the Baluchis against his regime.

Among the 60 countries that joined the boycott to varying degrees, some fully withdrew, while others allowed athletes to compete under neutral flags. Each country's decision reflected a mix of political pressure, national interest, and individual athlete choice. The following countries participated in the boycott:

- Albania
- Antigua and Barbuda
- Argentina
- Bahamas
- Bahrain
- Bangladesh
- Barbados
- Belize
- Bermuda
- Bolivia
- Canada
- Cayman Islands
- Central African Republic
- Chad
- Chile
- China
- Egypt
- El Salvador
- Fiji
- Gabon
- The Gambia
- West Germany
- Ghana
- Haiti
- Honduras
- Hong Kong
- Indonesia
- Iran
- Israel
- Ivory Coast
- Japan
- Kenya
- South Korea
- Liberia
- Liechtenstein
- Malawi
- Malaysia
- Mauritania
- Mauritius
- Monaco
- Morocco
- Netherlands Antilles
- Niger
- Norway
- Pakistan
- Panama
- Papua New Guinea
- Paraguay
- Philippines
- Qatar
- Saudi Arabia
- Singapore
- Somalia
- Sudan
- Suriname
- Swaziland
- Chinese Taipei (Taiwan)
- Thailand
- Togo
- Tunisia
- Turkey
- United Arab Emirates
- United States
- Upper Volta
- Uruguay
- Virgin Islands
- North Yemen
- Zaire

== Altered participation ==
During the 1980 Moscow Olympics, several nations and athletes participated under modified conditions due to the U.S.-led boycott. While some governments officially withdrew their athletes from the Games, individual competitors often chose to participate under neutral flags or alternative arrangements, balancing personal ambition with political pressure.

=== Nations that did not participate in the opening ceremony ===
Seven countries participated in the Games under the Olympic flag without taking part in the opening ceremony:

- Belgium
- France
- Italy
- Luxembourg
- Netherlands
- San Marino
- Switzerland

=== National teams represented at the opening ceremony by Chef de Mission ===
Two nations sent one representative each (Chef de Mission) who entered the Olympic stadium during the opening ceremony under the Olympic flag; for each country this was a token gesture, as their governments allowed individual national sports federations and in some cases individual athletes to take part in the Games if they chose to do so. Ireland also competed under the Olympic flag, rather than its own:

- Great Britain – Richard Palmer
- Ireland – Ken Ryan

=== Nations that competed under their respective NOC flag ===
Some nations competed under the flag of their National Olympic Committee:

- Spain
- Portugal
- New Zealand

== Alternative events ==
Events were staged separately in several sports, including the Liberty Bell Classic for track and field and the USGF International Invitational for gymnastics. The U.S.–Cuban 12-bout card at the Charlotte Coliseum (on Independence Boulevard, now Bojangles' Coliseum) on February 10, 1980, became the only meeting between Cuban and American boxers and was an important event in boxing; called "one of the prime matches of the year," by U.S. boxing coach Tom Johnson.

== See also ==
- 1984 Summer Olympics boycott
- 1986 Asian Games
- List of Olympic Games boycotts
