= 1976 Summer Olympics torch relay =

- Host city: Montreal, Canada
- Countries visited: Greece, Canada
- Distance: 775 km
- Torchbearers: 1,214 (approx.)

The 1976 Summer Olympics torch relay celebrated the first time that a Canadian city had hosted the Games. Convention states that the flame should be lit at Olympia in Greece and then transported to Athens, making its way onwards to the host city. On this occasion, a signal was sent via satellite to transmit the flame to Ottawa, where it would then make its way to the 1976 Summer Olympics opening ceremony in Montreal and a second ceremony in Kingston, Ontario.

== Relay elements ==
=== Torch ===
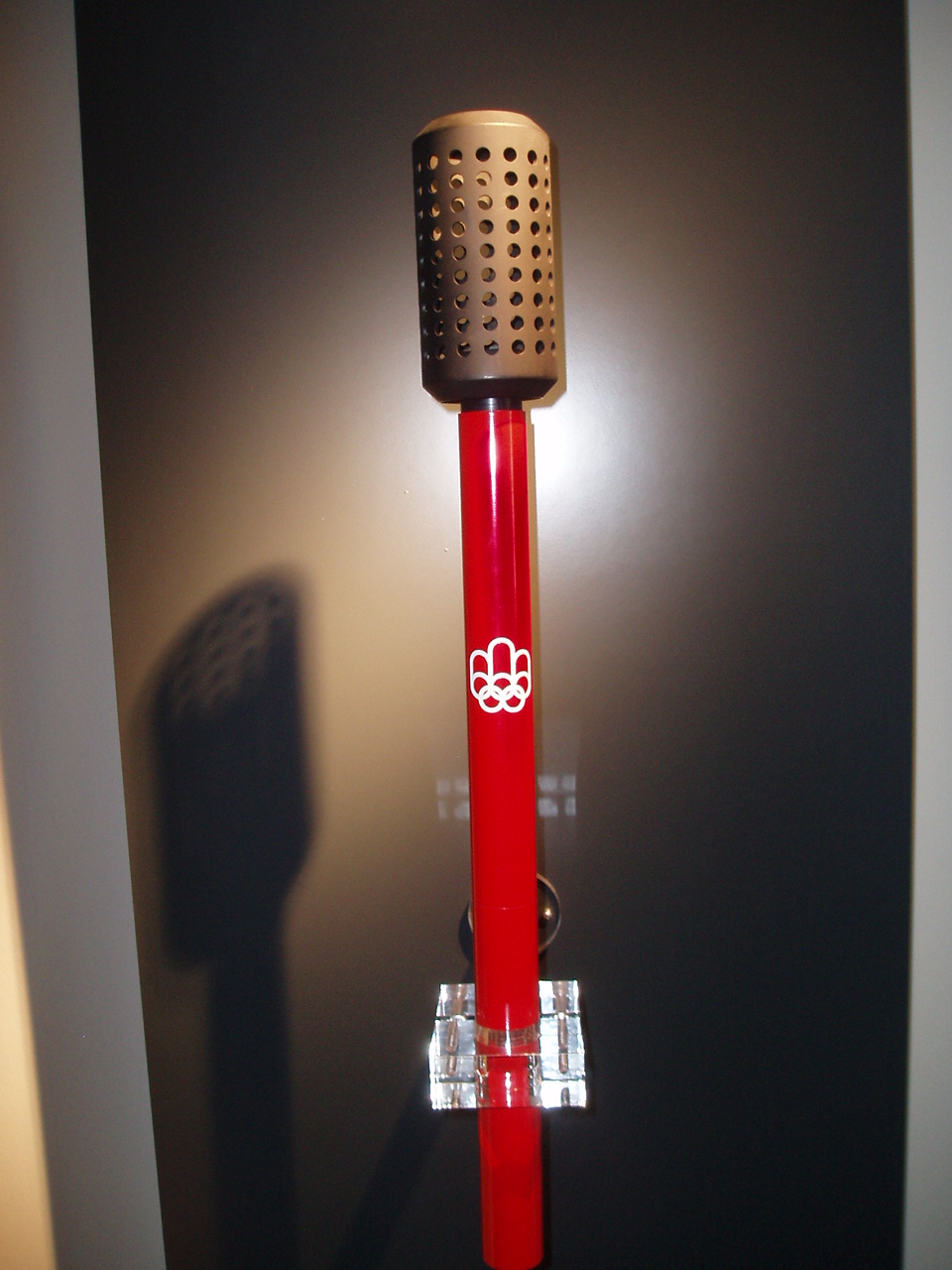
One of the torches used in the relay, showing the logo of the Games on the handle.

The torch was primarily made of aluminium and weighed 836 grams. It was fuelled by olive oil in part to further strengthen the link to the Greek origins of the events.

=== Torch-bearers ===
There were around 1,214 torch-bearers who travelled a combined total of 775 km through Greece and Canada. For the section of the relay within Canada, there were more than 4,000 applicants for just over 700 positions. Various criteria were enforced to ensure the quality of the runners, including the ability to run a kilometre in five minutes or less. For the first time, a computer was used to select the torch-bearers based on these criteria. Unsuccessful candidates were encouraged to escort the torch-bearer during their run.

As well, organizers published the "Flame Bearer's Guide," a pamphlet to help torchbearers prepare for the relay. The guide, completed several months before the event, contained rules and specific details about how torchbearers should carry the torch and how to transfer the flame.

=== Route ===
During the bidding process, the Canadian Olympic Committee and the OCO'76 considered reproducing the route taken by the country's discoverer, Jacques Cartier. However, they realized it would be very similar to the 1968 Summer Olympics torch relay held in Mexico, which retraced the route traversed by Christopher Columbus. Several alternatives were considered, but there were also issues related to the budget and duration of the relay, as there was already a consensus that the torch relay would take five days between Ottawa and Montreal.

As per tradition, the torch was lit at the Temple of Hera in Olympia and traveled throughout Greek territory for a week until reaching the Panathenaic Stadium in Athens. Given the logistical issue, the torch would have to go to Canada, but as budget and time would be tight, organizers devised a creative solution to move the fire to the other side of the Atlantic without the use of the sea. In Athens, the Olympic flame lit a 90 cm urn in front of a sensor that detected ionised particles, and was then encoded into impulses and sent via satellite to Ottawa. The arrival of the signal activated a laser that recreated the Olympic flame in an equal 90 cm urn in the Canadian city.

=== Continuation of the relay ===
Though the flame had reached the Olympic Stadium and was used to mark the opening of the Games, the relay actually continued to a second venue. The flame was taken to Kingston, Ontario, the site of sailing and yachting events, using a variety of unusual transportation methods. Horseback, bicycle, and canoes helped transport the flame to the city, in addition to the more traditional running relay.

=== Lighting of the cauldron ===
For the first time in the history of the torch relay, two athletes lit the cauldron. The two final torch-bearers, Stéphane Préfontaine and Sandra Henderson, were 15 and 16 years old, respectively.

== Route ==
=== Route in Greece ===
1. Olympia
2. Krestena
3. Zacharo
4. Kyparissia
5. Filiatra
6. Gargalianoi
7. Nestoras
8. Pylos
9. Messene
10. Kalamata
11. Sparta
12. Tripoli
13. Nafplio
14. Argos
15. Corinth
16. Megara
17. Eleusis
18. Athens

=== Route in Canada ===
Location	Map
Parliament Hill; Ottawa; Masson-Angers; Thurso; Montebello; Hawkesbury; Rigaud; Terrasse-Vaudreuil; Sainte-Anne-de-Bellevue; Lachine; Mount Royal	1976 Summer Olympics torch relay is located in Ontario-Quebec
Île Perrot; Cornwall; Long Sault; Upper Canada Village; Maitland; Saint Lawrence; Gananoque; Kingston; Montreal	1976 Summer Olympics torch relay is located in Ontario-Quebec
