= Christl Haas =

Austrian alpine skier (1943–2001)

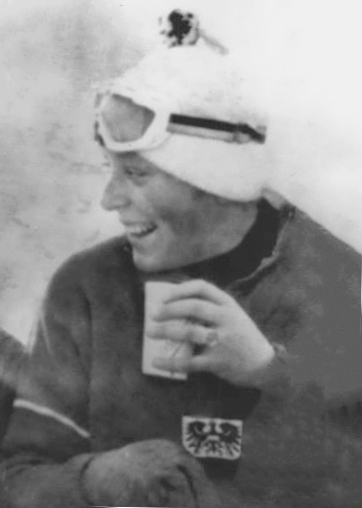
- Christl Haas in 1962

Personal information
- Born: 19 September 1943 Kitzbühel, Tyrol, Nazi Germany
- Died: 8 July 2001 (aged 57) Manavgat, Turkey
- Height: 177 cm (5 ft 10 in)
- Weight: 70 kg (154 lb)

Sport
- Sport: Alpine skiing
- Club: Kitzbüheler Ski Club
Medal record
Representing Austria
Olympic Games
Gold medal – first place	1964 Innsbruck	Downhill
Bronze medal – third place	1968 Grenoble	Downhill
World Championships
Gold medal – first place	1962 Chamonix	Downhill
Silver medal – second place	1964 Innsbruck	Combined

Christl Haas (19 September 1943 – 8 July 2001) was an Austrian Alpine skier. She competed at the 1964 and 1968 Winter Olympics and won a gold and a bronze medal, respectively.

== Biography ==
Haas grew up in Hahnenkamm, Kitzbühel, known for its alpine skiing courses. At the World Cup she won four downhill competitions in total. At the Alpine skiing World Championship 1962 in Chamonix, France, she won gold in the downhill competition.

Haas became a national hero as a twenty-year-old Olympic champion in the downhill event at the first Innsbruck Winter Olympics. She became an instant superstar in her homeland as she won the gold medal in her home nation. Haas followed up her success at Innsbruck with a bronze medal at the 1968 Winter Olympics in Grenoble, France.

After retiring from competitions Haas became a ski instructor and opened a sporting goods store in Sankt Johann. As an Austrian gold medalist, Haas was selected with luger Josef Feistmantl to light the Olympic torch for the opening of the 1976 Winter Olympics on 4 February 1976. In 2001, she had a heart attack while swimming in the Mediterranean Sea at Antalya, Turkey and died as a result.

== Notes and references ==
Olympic Games
Preceded by Günther Zahn	Final Olympic torchbearer 1976 Innsbruck; With: Josef Feistmantl	Succeeded by Stéphane Préfontaine and Sandra Henderson
Preceded by Hideo Takada	Final Winter Olympic torchbearer 1976 Innsbruck; With: Josef Feistmantl	Succeeded by Charles Morgan Kerr
