= 1960 Winter Olympics torch relay =

- Host city: Squaw Valley (now Olympic Valley), United States
- Countries visited: Norway, Denmark, United States
- Distance: 1,000 km (600 miles)
- Torchbearers: 600
- Start date: 31 January 1960
- End date: 18 February 1960
- Torch designer: John Hench

The 1960 Winter Olympics torch relay was held in the leadup to the 1960 Winter Olympics in Squaw Valley (now Olympic Valley), California, in the United States, from January 31 to February 18, 1960. It was the first torch relay in the Americas, although a flame had previously been lit at the 1932 Summer Olympics in Los Angeles. For the final time, the Olympic flame was not lit in the Greek city of Olympia. The relay instead began in Morgedal, Norway, as had been done for the first Winter Olympics torch relay in 1952.

== Organization ==
The responsibility for organizing the torch relay, in addition to the opening and closing ceremonies, fell to the Pageantry Committee and its chairman Walt Disney. Disney brought many employees of his company WED Enterprises (now known as Walt Disney Imagineering), who had recently designed and begun operating Disneyland, to organize these events.

The committee intended for the flame to be lit in Olympia, Greece, which was the established tradition for Summer Olympics but had never been done before in the Winter Olympics. However, the Hellenic Olympic Committee, which is responsible for lighting the flame at Olympia and transporting it through Greece before it is handed off to the organizing committee of the current Olympics, was only informed of these plans a few days before the relay was set to begin. With no torches on hand to relay the flame through Greece, no arrangements having been made for the transportation of the flame out of Greece, and winter weather that made the traditional lighting of the flame from the rays of the sun unlikely, the HOC turned down the organizing committee's request on January 28, just four days before the flame was supposed to arrive in Los Angeles. The Games' organizers quickly turned to the Norwegian Olympic Committee, asking them to light the flame at Morgedal, the birthplace of competitive skiing, as had been done for the 1952 relay. Norwegian officials agreed, and the flame was lit at Morgedal on January 31, where it was carried to Sondre Norheim's chalet by skier Olav Nordskog. It was then transported by car through Oslo to Copenhagen, Denmark, from which it was flown to Los Angeles.

== Torch ==
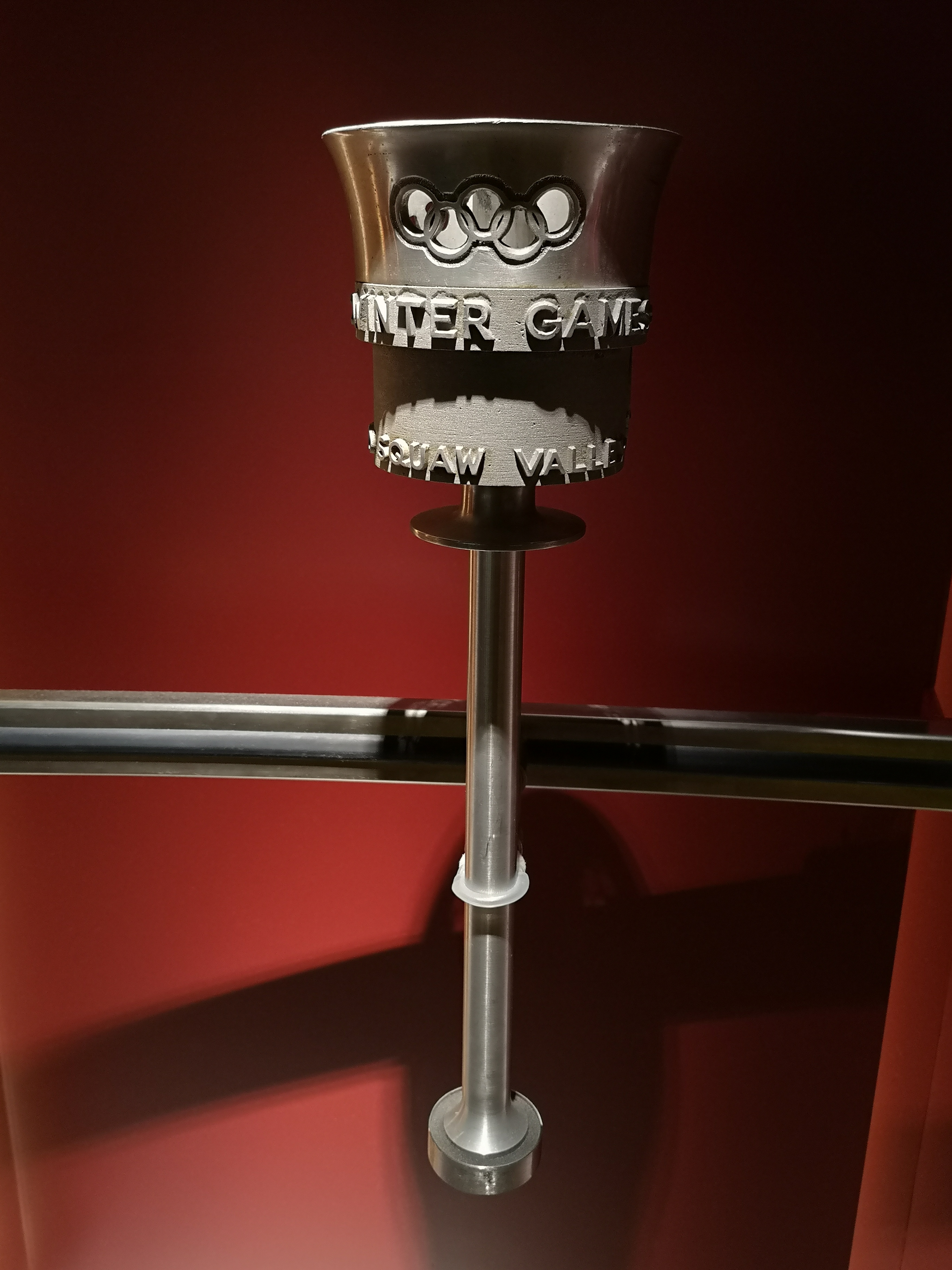
A torch from the relay at the Olympic Museum in Lausanne, Switzerland.

The torch was designed by Disney artist John Hench, who modeled it after the torches used in 1948 and 1956. The International Olympic Committee credits Ralph Lavers, who created the 1948 torch, as co-designing the 1960 torch with Hench. However, Hench found these torches to be too top-heavy and difficult to carry, and produced a smaller model which has influenced the design of later Olympic torches. The torch bears the inscriptions "VIII Olympic Winter Games 1960" and "Olympia to Squaw Valley", reflecting the canceled plan to light the flame in Greece.

== Route ==
Map of the route through California.

The Olympic flame arrived at Los Angeles International Airport on the morning of February 1, 1960. A Scandinavian Airlines jet liner carried it over the North Pole on its way to the United States. From the airport, a helicopter carried the torch to Los Angeles Memorial Coliseum, where the opening and closing ceremonies of the 1932 Summer Olympics had been held. Shot put champion Parry O'Brien was the first American to carry the torch, handing it to Los Angeles mayor Norris Poulson.

The first segment of the relay was run entirely on foot from Los Angeles to Stockton, with runners carrying the flame for roughly six hours per day and typically stopping in the mid-afternoon. For most of its journey across California, the torch was carried by high school athletes from all around the state. The California Interscholastic Federation organized the selection of torchbearers, with high school coaches allowed to choose one student each. Approximately 600 students participated in the relay, each one carrying the flame for one mile. Renault, a sponsor of the 1960 Winter Olympics, provided pace cars which followed the relay, picked up and dropped off runners, and supplied them with torches and fuel. The cars were driven by officers of the California Highway Patrol.

On the first day of the relay, the torch was carried from Los Angeles to Glendale and into the San Fernando Valley before stopping for the night in Burbank. Gymnasts from Burbank's John Burroughs High School, including a young Dan Haggerty, formed a human pyramid that lifted the torch up and used it to light a large replica torch in front of City Hall. Similar lighting ceremonies were staged in many of the towns the relay passed through, and these torches continued burning until the Olympics ended.

On February 2, the runners passed through San Fernando, Newhall, and Castaic (the latter two now part of Santa Clarita), then following the Ridge Route before stopping for the night in Gorman.

Entering the San Joaquin Valley, the arrival of the flame coincided with the opening of the first segment of eight-lane freeway that would become Interstate 5 in Grapevine, and the torchbearers and pace cars were the first to use the new roadway. The relay's third day ended in Bakersfield.

On February 4, the runners passed through Delano, where a flock of doves was released. In Earlimart, runners followed the recessed freeway through town, but after an outcry from local residents who had expected the torch to stop, they were given an offshoot of the flame. From Tipton, another offshoot flame was carried eastward to Porterville while the primary flame continued north. The relay stopped for the evening in Tulare, with Olympians Bob Mathias and Sim Iness (both of whom grew up in Tulare) carrying the torch into town.

The next day, the relay stopped briefly in Kingsburg and Selma, where the lighting of the torch coincided with the unveiling of a memorial to local resident Ancel Robinson, who had broken the world record in the low hurdles in 1957. Runners officially ended the day on the steps of the Memorial Auditorium in Fresno, where the torch was greeted by Olympic athlete and former Fresno mayor Gordon Dunn and Olympic figure skater Carole Ormaca. Another offshoot flame was carried from Fresno to Sanger.

The relay's sixth day had the torch stop in Madera and end its run in Merced. On February 7, the run passed through Atwater, Livingston, and Delhi before a midday stop in Turlock, then proceeded through Ceres before finishing the day in Modesto. The final day of the first running segment took the torch to Ripon before it arrived in Stockton at noon on February 8.

From Stockton, the torch boarded the motor yacht Adventuress, part of the ceremonial "Great Golden Fleet", and sailed down the San Joaquin River to the Ferry Building in San Francisco. It was then run through the city before ending the day at City Hall. The next day, the Adventuress carried the torch back across the San Francisco Bay for a ceremony at Jack London Square in Oakland, before returning it to Stockton in the evening.

The foot relay resumed on February 10, with runners carrying the torch north from Stockton, through Thornton, and into Sacramento, where Governor Pat Brown lit a cauldron on the steps of the California State Capitol. The next day, it was run through Roseville and Auburn. While Auburn was the planned stopping point for February 11, runners continued that day to carry the torch all the way to Colfax, before it was driven back to Auburn to spend the night. On February 12, Lincoln's Birthday, the torch was driven to Colfax for the final running leg to Emigrant Gap.

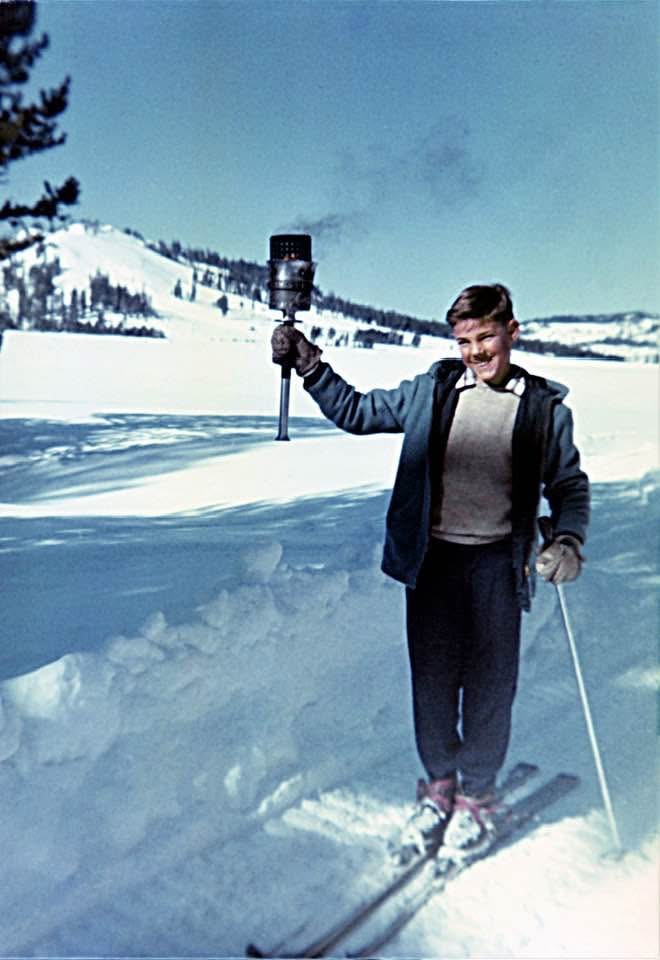
12 year old Dave Watts of Soda Springs CA carries the torch thru Donner Summit on the way to Squaw Valley

From Emigrant Gap, the torch was carried through the Sierra Nevada mountains by cross-country skiers, who brought it to the summit of Little Papoose Peak, just above the resort complex which had been built for the Games. While preparing for the final leg of the relay, organizers found that their torches could not withstand the anticipated high winds and would be blown out. As a result, instead of the standard torch design, a souvenir torch capable of holding a road flare was used. This souvenir had been given to a U.S. Olympic Committee member in Tulare, who had to give it back the day before the opening ceremonies.

Upon reaching the summit of Little Papoose Peak on the afternoon of February 18, the torch was brought down the ski jump ramp by Andrea Mead Lawrence, accompanied by an honor guard of eight members of the National Ski Patrol. Lawrence entered Blyth Arena, the opening ceremony venue, and passed the flame on to speed skater Ken Henry. Henry circled the ice rink, then lit the cauldron to mark the beginning of the Games.
