= Farewell Bend State Recreation Area =

State park in Oregon, United States

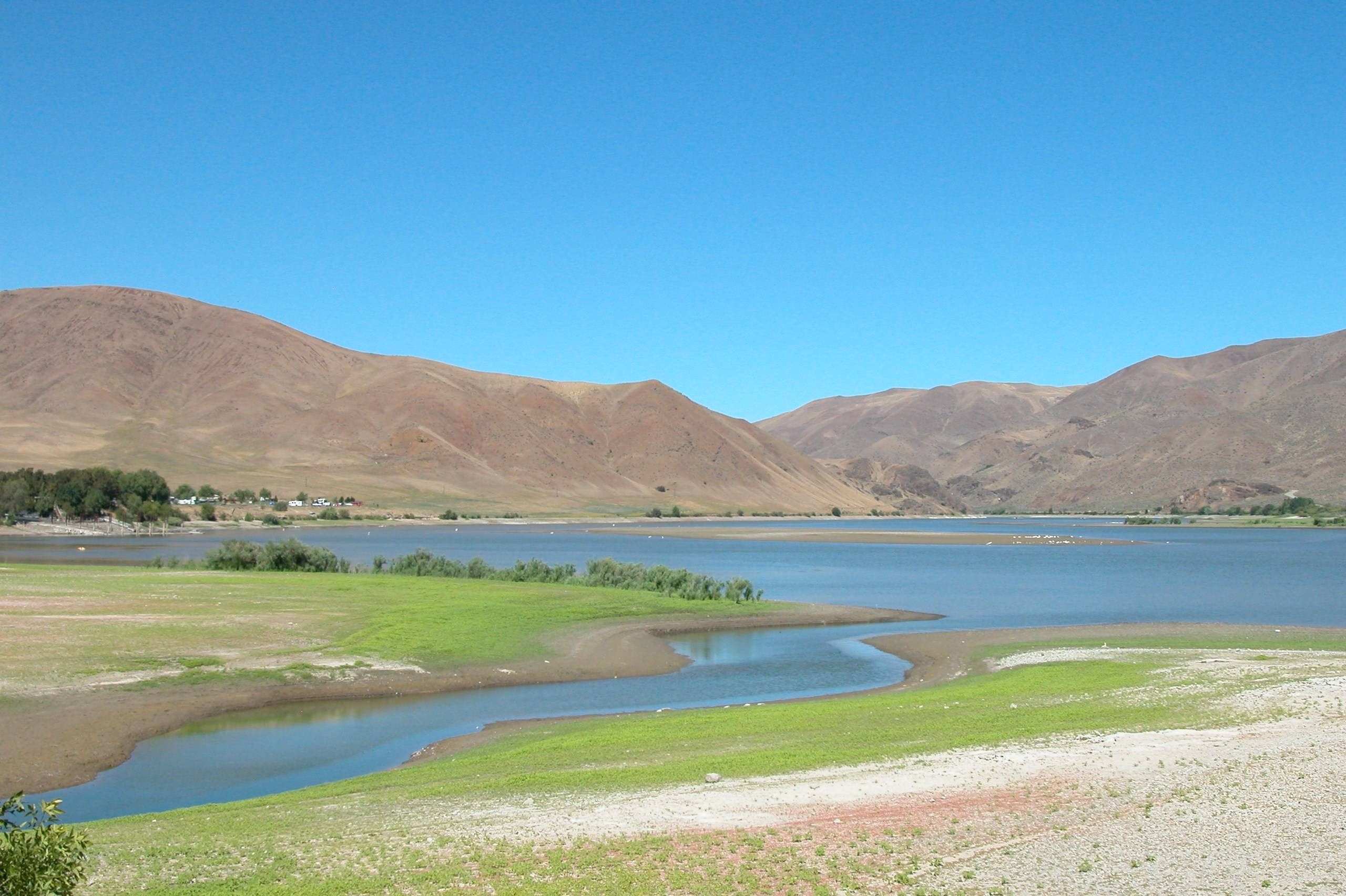

- Location within Oregon Location within the United States
- Type: Public, state
- Location: Baker County, Oregon
- Nearest city: Ontario
- Coordinates: 44°18′28″N 117°13′25″W
- Operator: Oregon Parks and Recreation Department

Farewell Bend State Recreation Area is a state park in Baker County, Oregon, United States, about 25 miles (40 km) northwest of Ontario. Farewell Bend was the last stop on the Oregon Trail along the Snake River where travelers could rest and water and graze their animals before the trail turned north through more rugged country to follow the Burnt River.

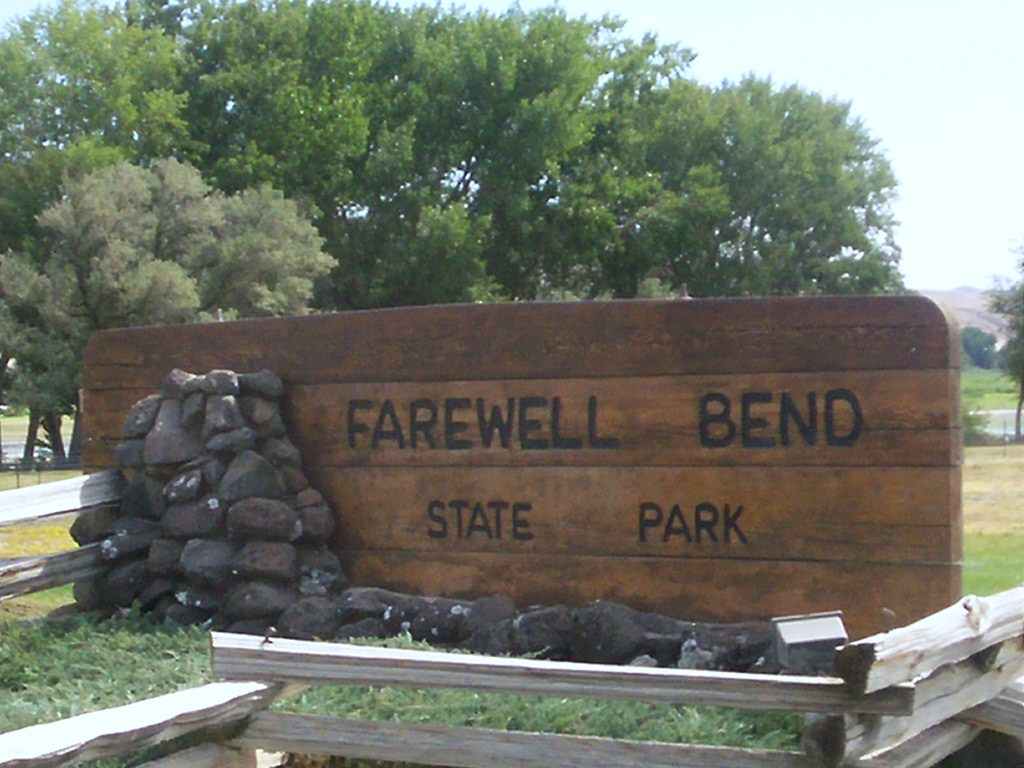
Park sign
