= Fresno Memorial Auditorium =

- U.S. National Register of Historic Places
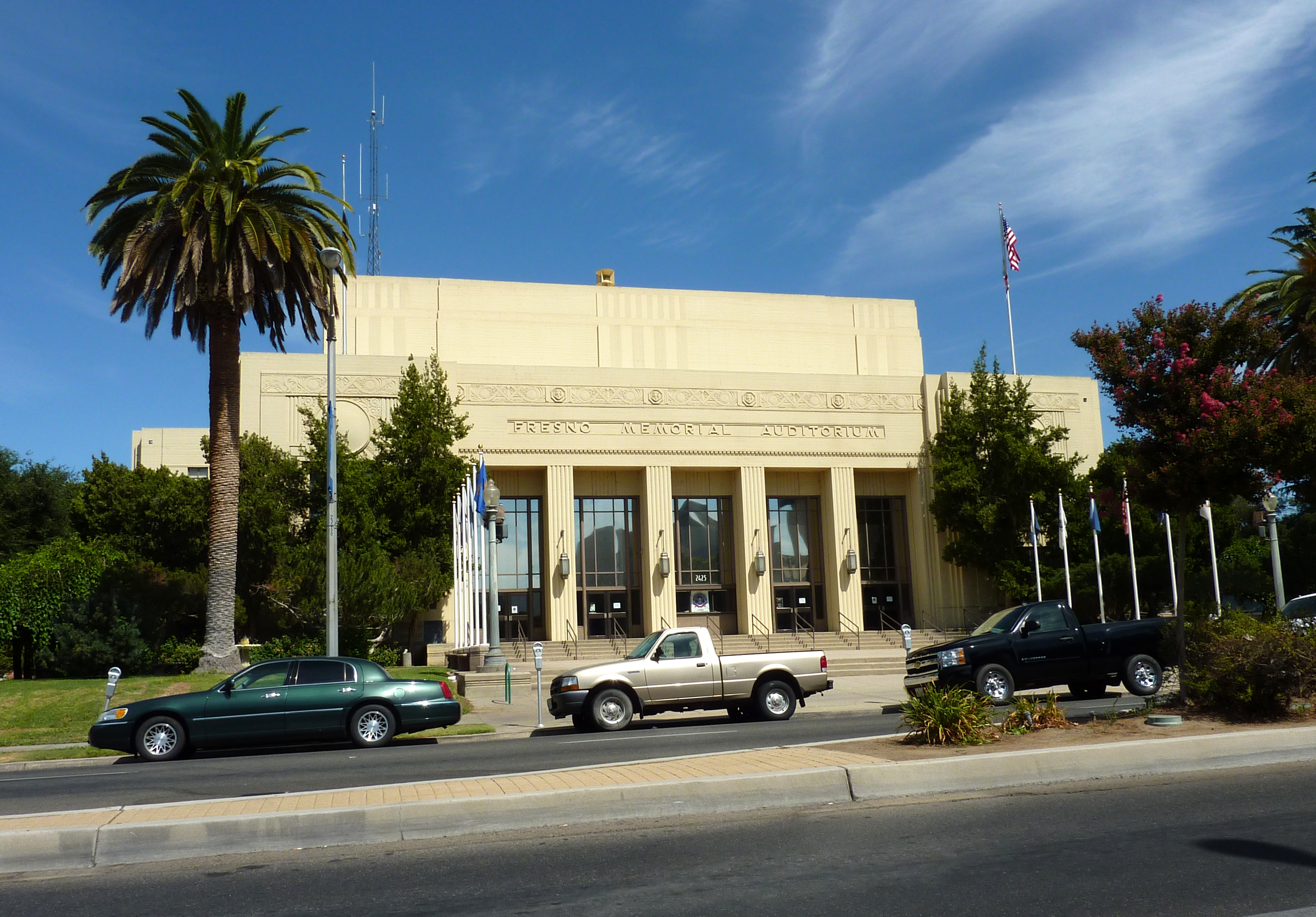

- Location within California
- Location: 2425 Fresno St., Fresno, California
- Coordinates: 36°44′23″N 119°47′15″W
- Area: 2.9 acres (1.2 ha)
- Built by: Trewhitt & Shields Company
- Architect: Allied Architects of Fresno
- Architectural style: Art Deco, Moderne
- NRHP reference No.: 94000427
- Added to NRHP: May 10, 1994

The Fresno Memorial Auditorium, at 2425 Fresno St. in Fresno, California, was listed on the National Register of Historic Places in 1994. Besides the one contributing building, the listing included two contributing objects and a contributing site on 2.9 acres (1.2 ha).

It has also been known as Veterans Memorial Auditorium. It was built during 1935–36 to accommodate a wide range of activities and performances. To take just one arbitrary example, Tallulah Bankhead performed in The Little Foxes here on January 9, 1941.

It was designed in Moderne and Art Deco style by "Allied Architects of Fresno"; it was built by contractor Trewhitt & Shields Company.
