= 1992 Summer Olympics torch relay =

- Host city: Barcelona, Catalonia, Spain
- Countries visited: Greece, Spain
- Distance: 5,940 kilometres (3,690 mi)
- Torchbearers: 9,484
- Start date: 5 June 1992
- End date: 25 July 1992
- Torch designer: André Ricard
- No. of torches: 9,484

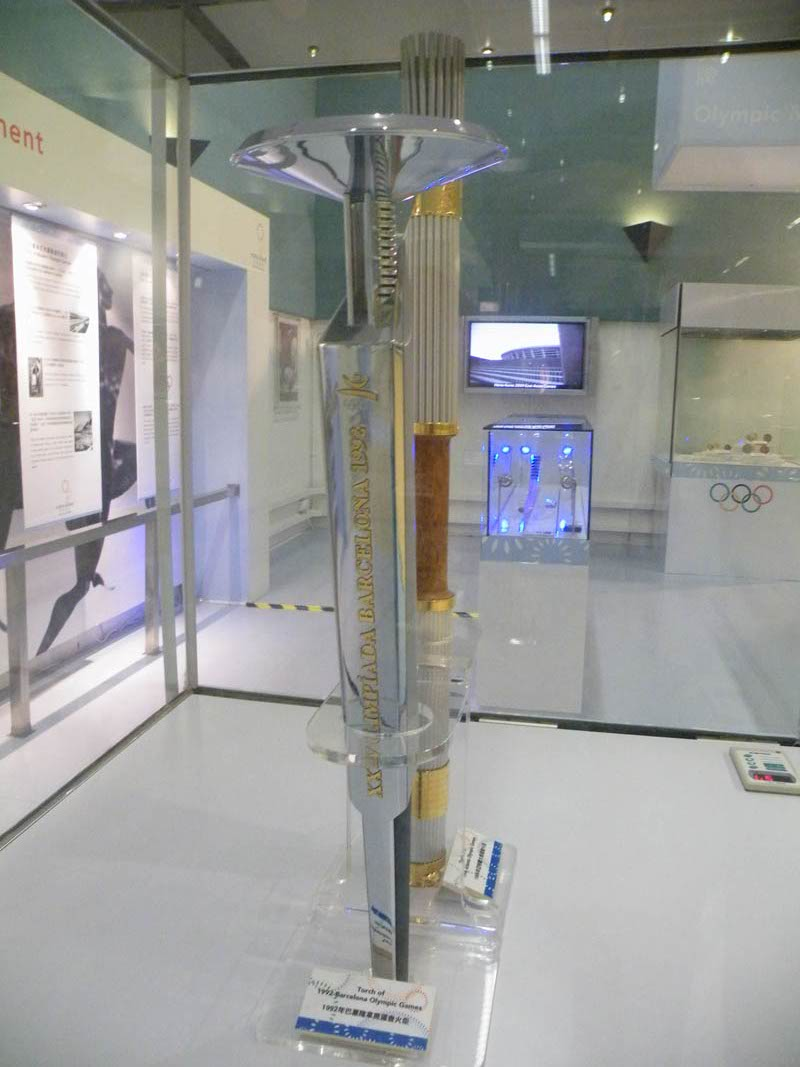
A torch from the relay

The 1992 Summer Olympics torch relay was run from 5 June until 25 July, prior to the 1992 Summer Olympics in Barcelona. The route covered 5,940 kilometres (3,690 mi) and involved 9,484 torchbearers (8,885 on foot and 599 on bicycle).

On 5 June, the Olympic fire was lit in Olympia and carried by relay to Athens. On June 9, in the port of Piraeus, it was embarked on the Spanish Navy frigate Cataluña. On 13 June, it arrived in Empúries, where it began its thirty-eight day journey all around Spain passing through 652 towns. In addition to on foot, the torch was carried by bicycle, plane, ship and hydrofoil. On 25 July, Herminio Menéndez entered the Estadi Olímpic de Montjuïc with the torch at the opening ceremony, he gave the last relief to Juan Antonio San Epifanio who lit an arrow that Antonio Rebollo shot to the cauldron, igniting the flame.

== Route ==
Date	Map
June 5: Olympia; June 7: Athens	1992 Summer Olympics torch relay is located in Greece
June 13 (day 1): Empúries; June 14 (day 2): Girona; June 20 (day 3): Lleida	1992 Summer Olympics torch relay is located in Catalonia
June 21 (day 4): Zaragoza; June 21 (day 4): Huesca; June 22 (day 5): Jaca	1992 Summer Olympics torch relay is located in Aragon
June 23 (day 6): Pamplona	1992 Summer Olympics torch relay is located in Navarre
June 24 (day 7): Logroño	1992 Summer Olympics torch relay is located in La Rioja, Spain
June 25 (day 8): Vitoria-Gasteiz; June 26 (day 9): Bilbao	1992 Summer Olympics torch relay is located in the Basque Country
June 27 (day 10): Santander	1992 Summer Olympics torch relay is located in Cantabria
June 27 (day 10): Gijón; June 28 (day 11): Oviedo	1992 Summer Olympics torch relay is located in Asturias
June 29 (day 12): Lugo; June 30 (day 13): La Coruña; July 1 (day 14): Santiago de Compostela; July 2 (day 15): Vigo; July 3 (day 16): Ourense	1992 Summer Olympics torch relay is located in Galicia
July 4 (day 17): Ponferrada; July 5 (day 18): León; July 6 (day 19): Valladolid; July 7 (day 20): Segovia	1992 Summer Olympics torch relay is located in Castile and León
July 8 (day 21): Madrid	1992 Summer Olympics torch relay is located in Community of Madrid
July 9 (day 22): Toledo	1992 Summer Olympics torch relay is located in Castilla-La Mancha
July 10 (day 23): Cáceres; July 10 (day 23): Badajoz; July 11 (day 24): Mérida	1992 Summer Olympics torch relay is located in Extremadura
July 12 (day 25): Huelva; July 13 (day 26): Seville	1992 Summer Olympics torch relay is located in Andalusia
July 14 (day 27): Santa Cruz de Tenerife; July 14 (day 27): Las Palmas	1992 Summer Olympics torch relay is located in Canary Islands
July 15 (day 28): Málaga; July 16 (day 29): Granada; July 17 (day 30): Almería	1992 Summer Olympics torch relay is located in Andalusia
July 18 (day 31): Murcia	1992 Summer Olympics torch relay is located in Murcia
July 19 (day 32): Alicante; July 20 (day 33): Valencia; July 20 (day 33): Castellón de la Plana	1992 Summer Olympics torch relay is located in Valencian Community
July 21 (day 34): Tortosa; July 22 (day 35): Tarragona	1992 Summer Olympics torch relay is located in Catalonia
July 23 (day 36): Palma de Majorca	1992 Summer Olympics torch relay is located in Balearic Islands
July 24 (day 37): Barcelona; July 25 (day 38): Estadi Olímpic de Montjuïc	1992 Summer Olympics torch relay is located in Barcelona districts
