= Sandra Henderson =

Canadian gymnast

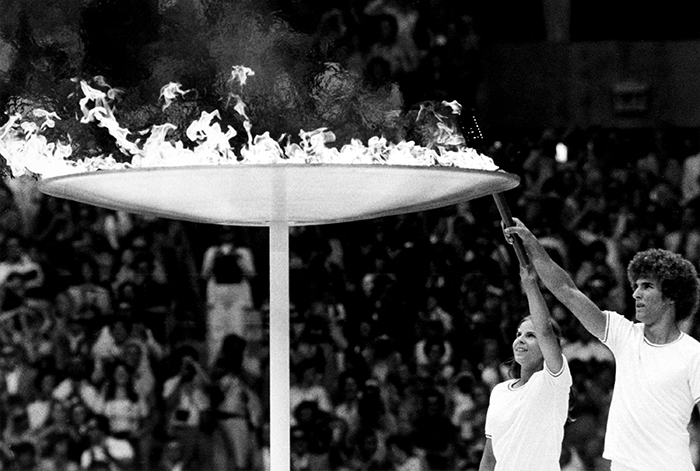
Préfontaine and Henderson lighting the Olympic Flame

Sandra James (née Henderson c. 1960) is a former Canadian gymnast best known for co-lighting the Olympic Flame with Stéphane Préfontaine at the 1976 Summer Olympics in Montreal. She appeared on the front page of Sports Illustrated.

Sandra Henderson tried out for the Olympic gymnastics team at the age of 16 to compete in the 1976 Summer Games, but did not make it due to injuries. She retired from gymnastics in 1977 but continued competing at the university level when she was a student at the University of Toronto.

== 1980 Olympics ==
At the beginning of the 1980 Summer Olympics Henderson, along with Stéphane Préfontaine, were given the task of delivering the Olympic flag from Montreal mayor Jean Drapeau to Lord Killanin in Moscow. Historically the Olympic flag was passed from host city mayor to the next host city mayor, but Canada was one of 64 countries that boycotted the games that year.

Olympic Games
| Preceded by Christl Haas and Josef Feistmantl | Final Olympic torchbearer Montreal 1976; With: Stéphane Préfontaine | Succeeded by Charles Morgan Kerr |
| Preceded by Günther Zahn | Final Summer Olympic torchbearer Montreal 1976; With: Stéphane Préfontaine | Succeeded by Sergei Belov |
