= Stéphane Préfontaine =

Canadian track athlete

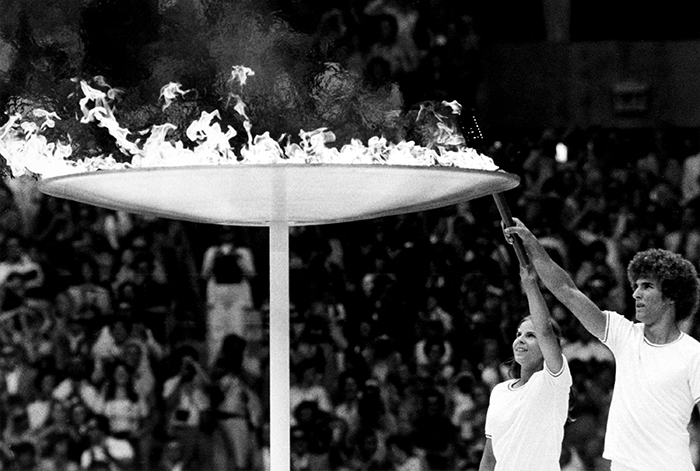
Préfontaine (right) and Henderson lighting the Olympic Flame

Stéphane Préfontaine (born c. 1961) is a Canadian track athlete best known for co-lighting the Olympic Flame with Sandra Henderson at the 1976 Summer Olympics in Montreal.

== Biography ==
Préfontaine attempted to compete in the athletics competition for Canada at the 1984 Summer Olympics in Los Angeles, but abandoned his dream after suffering tendon injuries.

He later earned his law degree from the University of Montreal, then a Masters of Law from Columbia University in New York. After earning his law degrees, Préfontaine studied philosophy and political science in France at the Institut d’Études Politiques de Paris (Institute of Political Studies of Paris in French), earning a first-year doctorate. While practising law, he also earned a Master of Business Administration in finance at McGill University in Montreal.

Préfontaine started his law practice in 1989 before going into venture capital in 2004. That same year he was part of the 2004 Summer Olympics torch relay when it returned to Montreal. He later founded Préfontaine Capital Inc., an independent investment advisory firm.

Olympic Games
Preceded by Christl Haas and Josef Feistmantl	Final Olympic torchbearer Montreal 1976; With: Sandra Henderson	Succeeded by Charles Morgan Kerr
Preceded by Günther Zahn	Final Summer Olympic torchbearer Montreal 1976; With: Sandra Henderson	Succeeded by Sergei Belov
