= Nerang–Murwillumbah Road =

Road in Queensland, Australia

Nerang–Murwillumbah Road Queensland

General information
- Type: Rural road
- Length: 36.4 km (23 mi)
- Route number(s): State Route 97 (Nerang – Natural Bridge)

Major junctions
- North end: Beaudesert–Nerang Road (State Route 90) Nerang; Mount Nathan Road (State Route 90) Nerang
- Beechmont Road; Latimers Crossing Road (State Route 42); Pine Creek Road
- South end: Numinbah Road (NSW Tourist Drive 34) Numinbah, New South Wales

Location(s)
- Major settlements: Advancetown, Numinbah Valley

Nerang–Murwillumbah Road is a continuous 36.4 kilometres (22.6 mi) road route in the Gold Coast region of Queensland, Australia. The entire road is signed as State Route 97. Nerang–Murwillumbah Road (number 201) is a state-controlled district road, rated as a local road of regional significance (LRRS).

== Route Description ==
The Nerang–Murwillumbah Road commences at an intersection with Beaudesert–Nerang Road and Mount Nathan Road (State Route 90) in Nerang. The road runs south-west, passing the south-eastern tip of Mount Nathan and then that of Clagiraba, while following the north-western boundary of Advancetown. It passes the exit to Beechmont Road as it turns south into Advancetown, and soon passes the exit to Advancetown–Mudgeeraba Road (Latimers Crossing Road) (State Route 42). The road again turns south-west, passing through Advancetown village before reaching the north-western extremity of Advancetown Lake, the body of water retained by the Hinze Dam.

The road continues in a southerly direction, following the western shore of the lake, until it reaches the south-western extremity. Here it crosses the Nerang River and passes the exit to Gold Coast-Springbrook Road (Pine Creek Road). It follows the river generally south through Numinbah Valley to Natural Bridge, crossing it on two more occasions. It then leaves the river and follows a ridge line, climbing until it reaches the Queensland / New South Wales border, where it ends. The physical road continues into New South Wales as Numinbah Road (Tourist Drive 34).

Land use along the road is primarily rural, with much natural bushland.

== Road condition ==
Nerang–Murwillumbah Road is fully sealed. It has about 11.5 kilometres (7.1 miles) with an incline greater than 5%, about 7.9 kilometres (4.9 miles) greater than 10%, and about 2.4 kilometres (1.5 miles)greater than 15%. The height above sea level at the border crossing is 405 metres (1,329 ft).

== History ==
The township of Nerang was surveyed in 1865. It became important to the surrounding district because it was the head of navigation on the Nerang River and the site of the first crossing for wheeled vehicles. From 1871 a Cobb & Co coach service ran from Brisbane, and river transport became more regular. The first industry to flourish was timber cutting, later followed by dairying and crop farming as tracts of native timber were cleared. The railway arrived in 1889.

Timber cutting began in Numinbah Valley soon after cedar was discovered there in 1845, and in the Advancetown area in the 1870s, with a saw mill established in 1881. Bullock teams hauled timber to Nerang for dispatch to customers, at first by ship and later by train. The village of Advancetown began as a rest stop for the bullock teams. In the 1860s surveyors mapping the Queensland / New South Wales border discovered a route from Numinbah Valley to the Tweed Valley in New South Wales. This, combined with the clearance of timber, led to settlers moving into the area.

The road first cut for bullock teams became a necessity for settlers, and improvements were made to support the operation of new farms.

== Upgrade ==
=== Improve safety ===
A project to improve safety on the road, at a cost of $37.5 million, was under construction in November 2021.

== Intersecting state-controlled roads ==
This road intersects with the following state-controlled roads:

- Beechmont Road
- Advancetown–Mudgeeraba Road

=== Beechmont Road ===
Beechmont Road
- Location: Nerang–Murwillumbah Road, Advancetown to Binna Burra Road, Beechmont
- Length: 18.3 km (11.4 mi)

Beechmont Road is a state-controlled district road (number 2020). It is rated as a local road of regional significance (LRRS). It runs from Nerang–Murwillumbah Road in Advancetown to Binna Burra Road in Beechmont, a distance of 18.3 kilometres (11.4 mi). This road has no major intersections.

=== Advancetown–Mudgeeraba Road ===
Advancetown–Mudgeeraba Road
- Location: Nerang–Murwillumbah Road, Advancetown to Pacific Motorway, Mudgeeraba
- Length: 13.0 km (8.1 mi)
- Route number: 42

Advancetown–Mudgeeraba Road is a state-controlled district road (number 2041), rated as a local road of regional significance (LRRS). It is signed as State Route 42. The western end is named Latimers Crossing Road. The road runs from Nerang–Murwillumbah Road in Advancetown to the Pacific Motorway in Mudgeeraba, a distance of 13.0 kilometres (8.1 mi). This road intersects with Hinze Dam Road in Gilston.

== Associated state-controlled roads ==
The following state-controlled roads are associated with the intersecting roads described above:

- Binna Burra Road
- Hinze Dam Road

=== Binna Burra Road ===
Binna Burra Road
- Location: Beechmont Road, Beechmont to Binna Burra Road, Binna Burra
- Length: 10.7 km (6.6 mi)

Binna Burra Road is a state-controlled district road (number 2021), rated as a local road of regional significance (LRRS). It runs from Beechmont Road in Beechmont to the end of Binna Burra Road in Binna Burra, a distance of 10.7 kilometres (6.6 mi). This road has no major intersections.

A project to repair extensive bushfire damage to Binna Burra Road was completed in November 2020.

=== Hinze Dam Road ===
Hinze Dam Road
- Location: Advancetown–Mudgeeraba Road, Gilston to Spillway Road, Advancetown
- Length: 3.3 km (2.1 mi)

Hinze Dam Road is a state-controlled district road (number 2107), rated as a local road of regional significance (LRRS). It runs from Advancetown–Mudgeeraba Road in Gilston to the Spillway Road in Advancetown, a distance of 3.3 kilometres (2.1 mi). This road has no major intersections.

== Major intersections ==
All distances are from Google Maps. The entire route is in the Gold Coast local government area.

Location	km	mi	Destinations	Notes
Nerang / Mount Nathan midpoint	0	0.0	Beaudesert–Nerang Road (State Route 90) – north–east – Nerang; Mount Nathan Road – north–west – Mount Nathan	Northern end of Nerang–Murwillumbah Road. Road runs south–west as State Route 97.
Advancetown / Clagiraba midpoint	2.9	1.8	Beechmont Road – south–west – Beechmont	
Advancetown	4.2	2.6	Latimers Crossing Road (part of Advancetown–Mudgeeraba Road) (State Route 42) – south-east – Mudgeeraba	
Numinbah Valley	17.9	11.1	Pine Creek Road (part of Gold Coast–Springbrook Road) – north–east, then south–east – Springbrook	
Natural Bridge / Numinbah, New South Wales midpoint	36.4	22.6	Numinbah Road (NSW Tourist Drive 34) – south – Murwillumbah, New South Wales	Southern end of Nerang–Murwillumbah Road (State Route 97). Physical road continues into New South Wales as Numinbah Road (Tourist Drive 34).
1.000 mi = 1.609 km; 1.000 km = 0.621 mi

== See also ==
- List of road routes in Queensland
- List of numbered roads in Queensland
