= Lower Beechmont, Queensland =

Lower Beechmont Queensland
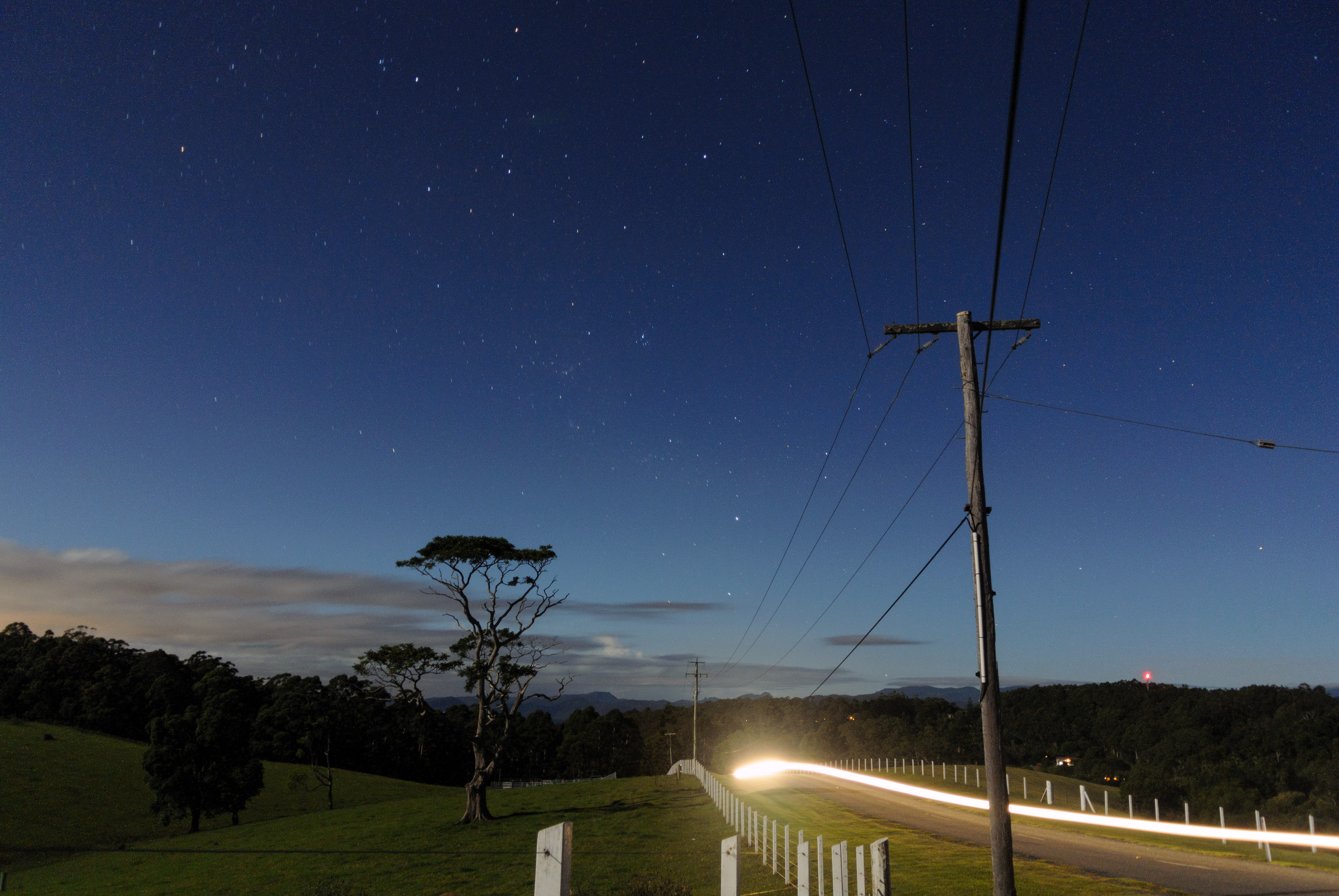
- Lower Beechmont on a brightly lit evening, 2015

- Coordinates: 28.0458°S 153.2422°E
- Population: 1,067 (2021 census)
  - Density: 64.67/km^{2} (167.5/sq mi)
- Postcode(s): 4211
- Area: 16.5 km^{2} (6.4 sq mi)
- Time zone: AEST (UTC+10:00)
- Location: 24.9 km (15 mi) WSW of Surfers Paradise; 87.4 km (54 mi) SSE of Brisbane
- LGA(s): City of Gold Coast
- State electorate(s): Mudgeeraba
- Federal division(s): Wright
Mean max temp	Mean min temp	Annual rainfall
36.8 °C; 98 °F	5.8 °C; 42 °F	1,637 mm 64.4 in
Suburbs around Lower Beechmont:
Witheren	Clagiraba	Advancetown
Witheren	Lower Beechmont	Advancetown
Beechmont	Beechmont	Advancetown

Lower Beechmont is a rural residential locality in the City of Gold Coast, Queensland, Australia. It is situated in the Gold Coast hinterland. In the 2021 census, Lower Beechmont had a population of 1,067 people.

== Geography ==
Lower Beechmont is situated on the northern extent of the Lamington Plateau formed by the Lismore/Beechmont Basalt flow from the Tweed Volcano, a large shield volcano. Beechmont Range, a prominent spur of the McPherson Range which runs through the locality roughly north to south, was created by the erosion of the volcanic shield by the Nerang and Coomera Rivers, and forms the divide between the north and south catchment areas of the Gold Coast hinterland.

Beechmont Road runs along the ridge of the range with housing on or close to the road to access the views. There is little development on the steep mountain sides. The locality is bordered by the Canungra Military Area to the west, Advancetown Lake catchment reserve to the south-east, and Lower Beechmont Conservation Area to the north.

Originally settled as farmland, the area has transformed in recent years to become a dormitory town of the Gold Coast as the city has grown westwards. Local government planning restrictions limit the area to low density housing in order to preserve the bush backdrop of the city.

== Indigenous Inhabitants ==
Lower Beechmont falls within the Yugambeh language region which stretches from the Logan River at Beenleigh, west to Beaudesert and south to the Tweed River. The Yugambeh people are the traditional owners of this area and have had a connection to the land for over 24,000 years. It is believed the area has been inhabited at least 6,500 years prior to European settlement by the Wanggeriburra clan, one of many Yugambeh family groups from the region encompassing the Lamington Plateau, Beechmont, Mundoolun and Tabragalba. Along with the Kombumerri clan, they traveled across the mountains of the Beechmont Range during migrations to and from coastal and inland areas.

== History ==
British settlement of the area started around 1860 with timber getters coming in search of valuable rainforest timbers such as red cedar and white beech trees. The first permanent settlers arrived in 1889 with the establishment of the dairy farming and banana growing.

Mr Armitage was an early settler in the area in the 1860s. Armitage Creek is named after him.

Ernest Bellis was a long time resident of the area. In the 1860s he was a 'oxen conductor' working a team of oxen to take timber down to Layhey's sawmill in Canungra. Bellis Creek is named after him.

Lower Beechmont State School was officially opened on 6 October 1922. The school suffered from low student enrollments and was closed a number of times the late 1920s and 1930s However it continued operating until 1967, when it finally closed due to continuing low student numbers. It was located near the intersection of Beechmont Road and Lower Beechmont School Road (approx 28.0641°S 153.2351°E).

Thomas (Tommy) Joseph Tarlington owned a 640-acre (260 ha) property on the northern end of the Beechmont plateau in 1930s, previously owned by Armitage. Tarlington retired to Bega in New South Wales where he died in 1946. The property was sold to Mr Chisholm in 1946 but retained the Tarlington name. Tarlington Pinches was the name given to the section of Beechmont Road, near Elimbah Court, where it descends from the plateau. The road continues to be narrow and dangerous to this day. Mr Chisholm established a sheep stud in 1953. He also established a goat stud.

During the construction of Beechmont Road in 1931, Laurie Hinde and Frankie Berg, who operated a team of horses for the construction, dug a hole in the rock and packed it with soil for a little bottle tree adjacent to Clagirba Creek on the original alignment of the road. The tree became a significant landmark for travelers on the mountain for many years until its death in early 2014. A new bottle tree has since been planted by Glenn Brinkman, a resident of Bottletree Lane, at the same location.

A daily mail service was established in September 1947 and a telephone office opened in March 1949. Despite requests by the local council as early as 1948, electricity was not supplied until 1961.

By the late 1960s, rural activities in the area had significantly declined. Residential development of the area started in the early 1980s and is now the predominant land use.

== Demographics ==
In the 2016 census, Lower Beechmont recorded a population of 1,046 people, 49.9% female and 50.1% male. The median age of the Lower Beechmont population was 42 years, 4 years above the national median of 38. Children aged 0 – 14 years made up 17.4% of the population and people aged 65 years and over made up 14.9% of the population. 69% of people living in Lower Beechmont were born in Australia. The other top responses for country of birth were England 8.2%, New Zealand 6.4%, South Africa 1.4%, Scotland 1.1% and Germany 1.1%. 91% of people spoke only English at home; the next most common languages were German 1.5%, Afrikaans 0.3%, Italian 0.3%, Slovak 0.3% and Japanese 0.3%.

In the 2021 census, Lower Beechmont had a population of 1,067 people.

== Education ==
There are no schools in Lower Beechmont. The nearest government primary schools are Gilston State School in Gilston to the east, Beechmont State School in neighbouring Beechmont to the south-west, and Canungra State School in Canungra to the west. The nearest government secondary school is Nerang State High School in Nerang to the north-east.

== Amenities ==
=== Syd Duncan Park ===
Syd Duncan Park is a large green expanse situated on the southern side of the rise above Beechmont Road. The park provides views of the Numinbah Valley and Advancetown Lake, and across to Currumbin and Tallebudgera Valleys.

The park was named after Mr Syd Duncan, who operated a dairy farm at the site and donated the land to the council for use as a community park. Mr Duncan had lost everything in a house fire in November 1950 and was substantially assisted by the community to recover.

The park is home to a community-built nature play space, which includes a dry creek bed, timber structures for physical and imaginative play, a tunnels embankment slide, basketball court and more.

=== Lower Beechmont Conservation Area ===
The Lower Beechmont Conservation Area is one of the largest conservation areas managed by the Gold Coast City Council. Covering 775 hectares, it is part of the habitat corridor between Canungra and Coombabah and is a critical link between Mount Tamborine and Springbrook.

The area was purchased using the Open Space Preservation Levy paid by Gold Coast ratepayers and forms an important piece of the green backdrop of the city. Fauna surveys have revealed the presence of 257 species, including twenty species listed as threatened under State or Commonwealth legislation.

The lookout off the end of Freemans Road offers views across the city and out to sea. On clear days it is possible to see out over Moreton Bay and glimpse the buildings of Brisbane.

== Community groups ==
The Beechmountain branch of the Queensland Country Women's Association meet in Lower Beechmont. In the 2019 bushfires, the branch provided a 24/7 service providing 6,000 meals for hundreds of firefighters.

The Lower Beechmont Rural Fire Brigade is at 2 Mirani Street (28.0643°S 153.2357°E). It was established in 1986 to protect the local community from the threat of bushfire. It is made up of local volunteer firefighters and is a member of the Rural Fire Service Queensland.
