= Beaudesert–Nerang Road =

Road in Queensland, Australia

Beaudesert–Nerang Road Queensland

General information
- Type: Road
- Length: 58.9 km (37 mi)
- Route number(s): State Route 90

Major junctions
- East end: Southport–Nerang Road, Nerang
- Nerang–Murwillumbah Road; Beaudesert–Beenleigh Road
- West end: Mount Lindesay Highway, Beaudesert

Location(s)
- Major suburbs: Nerang, Canungra, Beaudesert

Beaudesert–Nerang Road (State Route 90) is a major inter-regional arterial road that connects the township of Beaudesert with the Gold Coast via Canungra. The road commences in Nerang on the western edge of the Gold Coast and travels west through the Gold Coast hinterland and terminates in central Beaudesert at the intersection of Mount Lindesay Highway (National Route 13).

It is a state-controlled road (number 202) of which part is in the regional network and part in the district network. The district part is rated as a local road of regional significance (LRRS).

A section of Beaudesert–Nerang Road is now known locally (with Local and State Government approval) as Mount Nathan Road. This runs between the Nerang–Murwillumbah Road intersection in Nerang and The Oval Drive intersection in Mount Nathan. Another section of the official road between Wonglepong and Tabragalba is bypassed by State Route 90, which follows Mundoolun Connection Road from Wonglepong to Tamborine, and Beaudesert-Beenleigh Road from there to Tabragalba.

== Route description ==
The road starts in Nerang at an intersection with Ferry Street. It runs south-west as Price Street and then west and south-west to an intersection with Nerang–Murwillumbah Road, where it turns west as Mount Nathan Road. It then turns north to Mount Nathan, where the name reverts, leaving the Nerang River catchment for that of the Coomera River. From there it turns west and south-west, following the Coomera River valley upstream to Witheren, crossing the river three times. At Witheren the road passes Kokoda Barracks, the headquarters of the Australian Army’s Land Warfare Training Centre. From there it crosses a watershed to Canungra, where it encounters Canungra Creek, a tributary of the Albert River.

From Canungra it runs north-west, following the Canungra Creek valley downstream towards Tamborine. At an intersection in Wonglepong the named road turns west while State Route 90 continues north on Mundoolun Connection Road to an intersection with Beaudesert-Beenleigh Road, where it turns south-west, crossing the Albert River and continuing generally south-west, following the Albert River valley upstream towards Beaudesert. At an intersection in Tabragalba the named road enters from the east and continues south-west as State Route 90. It then turns west and north-west, entering Beaudesert as Albert Street and William Street. It ends at an intersection with the Mount Lindesay Highway.

This road is part of a network that enables access to Tamborine Mountain from four lowland points, thus providing alternatives in case of flooding, other natural disasters, or planned maintenance.

== Upgrades ==
=== Safety improvements ===
A project to provide safety improvements to sections of Beaudesert–Nerang Road and Beaudesert-Beenleigh Road, at a cost of $24 million, was due for completion in mid-2022.

=== Intersection improvement ===
A project to upgrade the intersection with Oxenford–Coomera Gorge Road, at a cost of $4.9 million, was expected to begin in early 2022.

== Major Intersections ==
| LGA | Location | km | mi | Destinations | Notes |
|---|---|---|---|---|---|
| City of Gold Coast | Nerang | 0 | 0.0 | Southport–Nerang Road – north–east as Price Street – Southport; Nerang–Broadbeach Road – south–east as Ferry Street – Broadbeach; Nerang Connection Road – north–west as Ferry Street – Pacific Motorway | Eastern terminus of road. State Route 90 continues south–east. Road runs south–west as Price Street (State Route 90) changing to Beaudesert–Nerang Road as it leaves the town of Nerang. |
| City of Gold Coast | Nerang | 4.1 | 2.5 | Nerang–Murwillumbah Road – south–west – Advancetown | Road turns west as Mount Nathan Road |
| City of Gold Coast | Mount Nathan, Maudsland midpoint | 8.3 | 5.2 | The Oval Drive – south–west – Mount Nathan | Road continues north west as Beaudesert–Nerang Road |
| Scenic Rim Region | Wonglepong | 31.9 | 19.8 | Beaudesert–Nerang Road (no shield) – west – Tabragalba; Wonglepong Road – east – Wonglepong | State Route 90 continues north as Mundoolun Connection Road |
| Scenic Rim Region | Tamborine | 41.2 | 25.6 | Beaudesert–Beenleigh Road – north–east – Tamborine township | State Route 90 continues south west as Beaudesert–Beenleigh Road |
| Scenic Rim Region | Tabragalba | 51.2 | 31.8 | Beaudesert–Nerang Road (no shield) – east – Wonglepong | State Route 90 continues south west as Beaudesert–Nerang Road |
| Scenic Rim Region | Beaudesert | 58.9 | 36.6 | Mount Lindesay Highway – north – Jimbooma, – south–west – Rathdowney; Brisbane Street – south – Beaudesert | Western terminus of road. State Route 90 continues west via Mount Lindesay Highway to Coulson. |
1.000 mi = 1.609 km; 1.000 km = 0.621 mi: Route transition

== See also ==
- List of numbered roads in Queensland
