= Clagiraba, Queensland =

Clagiraba
- Suburb
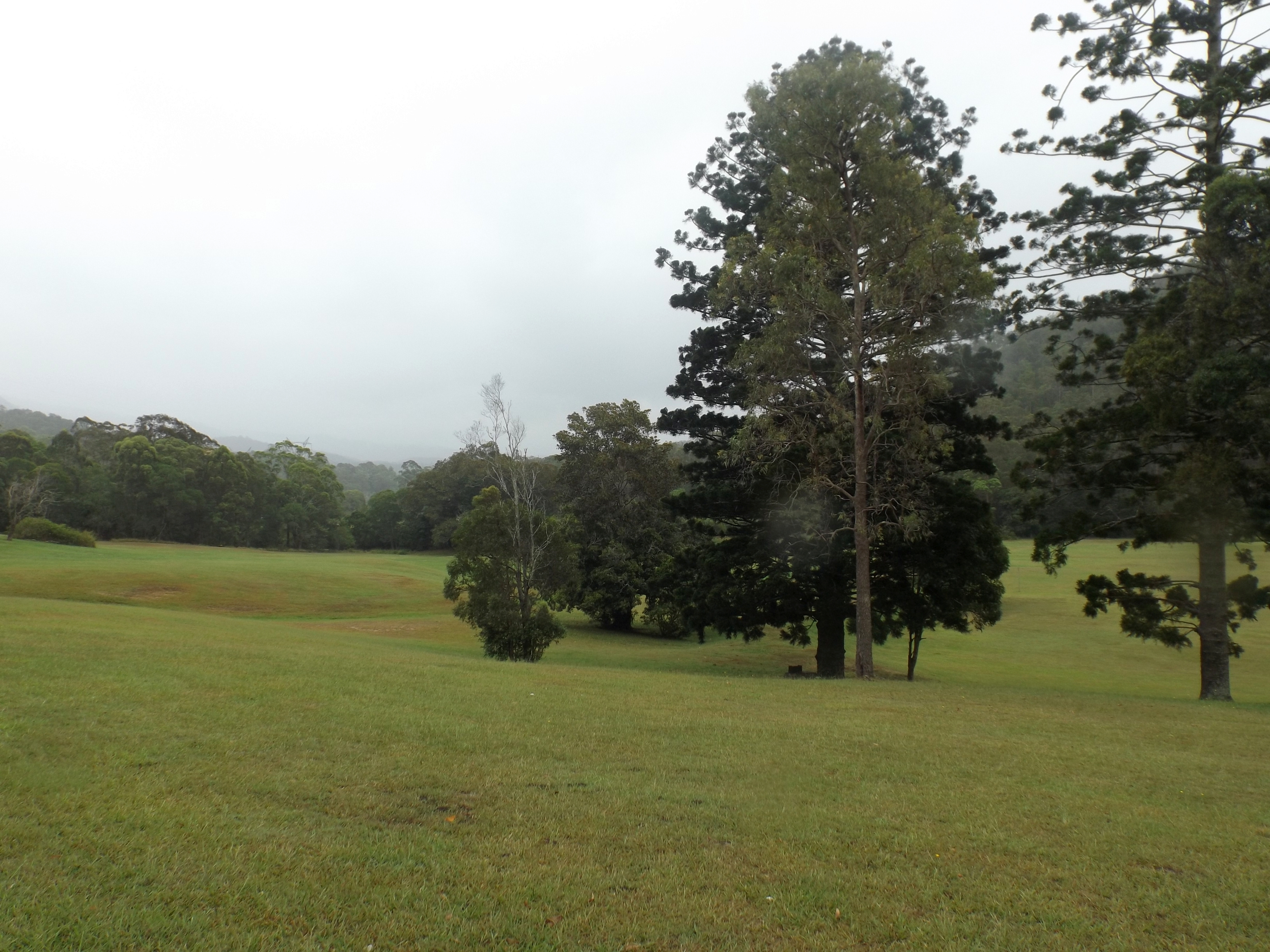
- Little Clagiraba Reserve, 2016

- Interactive map of Clagiraba
- Coordinates: 27.995°S 153.2441°E
- Country: Australia
- State: Queensland
- City: Gold Coast
- LGA: City of Gold Coast
- Location: 11.0 km (6.8 mi) W of Nerang; 16.4 km (10.2 mi) SE of Tamborine Mountain; 19.0 km (11.8 mi) W of Southport; 21.0 km (13.0 mi) W of Surfers Paradise; 73.9 km (45.9 mi) S of Brisbane

Government
  - State electorates: Mudgeeraba; Theodore
  - Federal division: Forde

Area
  - Total: 27.8 km^{2} (10.7 sq mi)

Population
  - Total: 651 (2021 census)
  - Density: 23.42/km^{2} (60.65/sq mi)
- Time zone: UTC+10:00 (AEST)
- Postcode: 4211
Suburbs around Clagiraba
Tamborine Mountain	Guanaba	Mount Nathan
Witheren	Clagiraba	Mount Nathan
Witheren	Lower Beechmont	Advancetown

Clagiraba is a rural locality in the City of Gold Coast, Queensland, Australia. In the 2021 census, Clagiraba had a population of 651 people.

== Geography ==
Clagiraba is 25 kilometres (16 mi) west of Surfers Paradise in the Gold Coast's hinterland. It is between Mount Nathan and Witheren and also encompasses the southern end of Tamborine Mountain.

Beaudesert-Nerang Road (State Route 90) runs through from east to south-west. Nerang–Murwillumbah Road (State Route 97) runs along a part of the south-eastern boundary.

== History ==
Clagiraba is named from Clagiraba Creek, a tributary of the Coomera River. The name Clagiraba is derived from the indigenous name 'Kalagareebah' meaning young or single men's ground. This was a region where young Indigenous men were taken during their initiation ceremony.

== Demographics ==
In the 2011 census, the suburb recorded a population of 561 people.

In the 2016 census, Clagiraba had a population of 601 people.

In the 2021 census, Clagiraba had a population of 651 people.

== Education ==
There are no schools in Clagiraba. The nearest government primary schools are St Bernard State School in neighbouring Tamborine Mountain to the north-west, Gaven State School in Oxenford to the north-east, Nerang State School in Nerang to the east, Gilston State School in Gilston to the south-east, and Canungra State School in Canungra to the south-west. The nearest government secondary schools are Tamborine Mountain State High School in neighbouring Tambourine Mountain to the north-west, Pacific Pines State High School in Pacific Pines to the north-east, and Nerang State High School in Nerang to the east.

== Amenities ==
There are a number of parks in the area:

- Clagiraba Road Causeway Reserves (27.9889°S 153.2440°E)
- Coolbunbin Creek Reserve (28.0078°S 153.2859°E)
- Freeman Family Park (28.0225°S 153.2497°E)
- Henri Robert Drive Reserve (27.9799°S 153.2471°E)
- Heritage Drive Reserve (27.9720°S 153.2521°E)
- King Parrot Reserve (27.9677°S 153.2293°E)
- Little Clagiraba Reserve (27.9953°S 153.2584°E)
- Lower Beechmont Conservation Area (28.0116°S 153.2564°E)
- Mango Tree Park (27.9905°S 153.2389°E)
- Scenic Reserve (28.0318°S 153.2528°E)
- Stewart Road Parklands (27.9605°S 153.2541°E)

== Facilities ==
Clagiraba Rural Fire Station is at 177 Clagiraba Road near Little Clagiraba Reserve (27.9956°S 153.2569°E).
