= Natural Bridge, Queensland =

Natural Bridge Gold Coast, Queensland
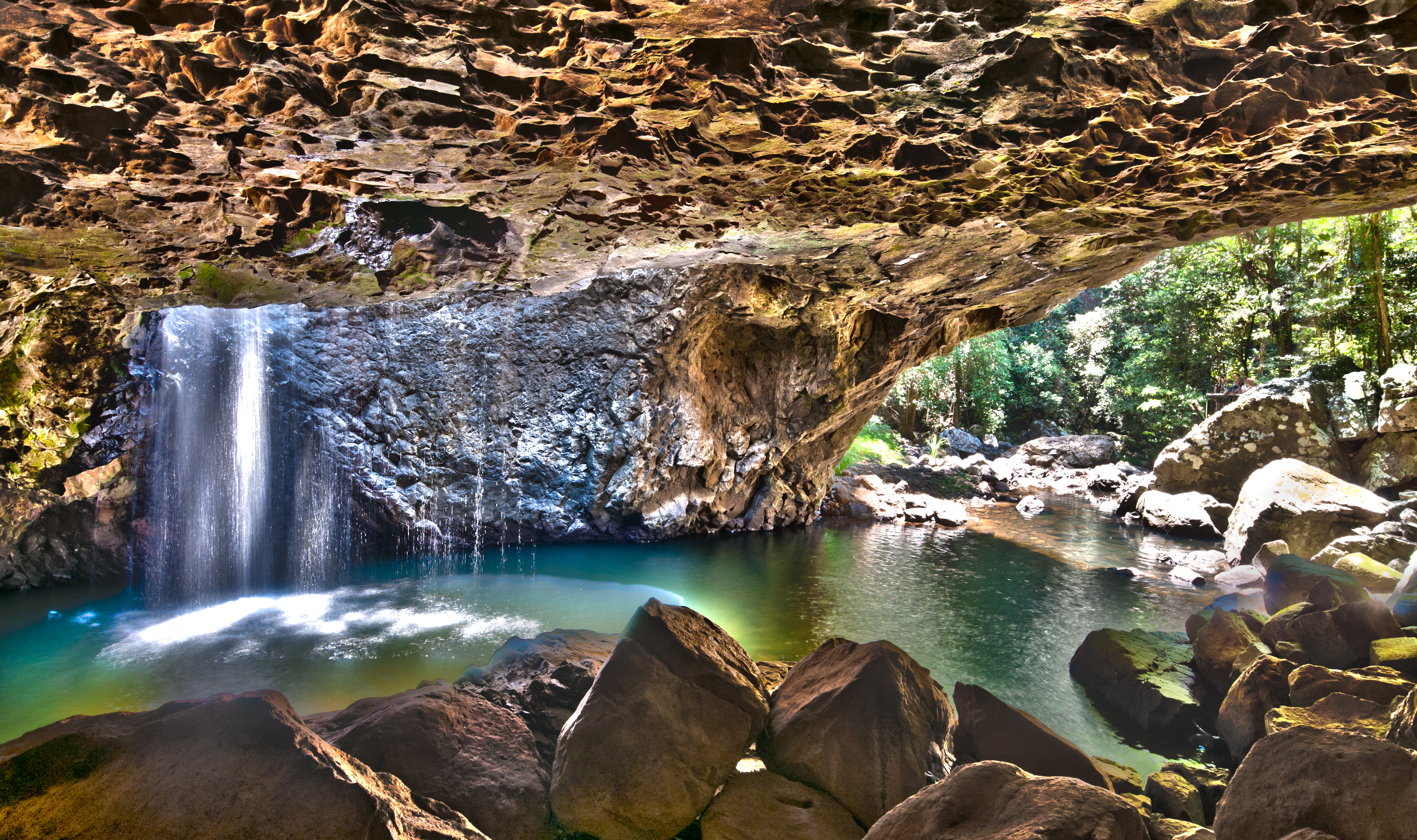
- Natural Bridge cave and waterfall, 2012

- Coordinates: 28.2205°S 153.2286°E
- Population: 90 (2021 census)
  - Density: 2.14/km^{2} (5.54/sq mi)
- Established: 1979
- Postcode(s): 4211
- Area: 42.1 km^{2} (16.3 sq mi)
- Time zone: AEST (UTC+10:00)
- Location: 35.3 km (22 mi) SSW of Nerang; 45.8 km (28 mi) SW of Southport; 46.8 km (29 mi) SW of Surfers Paradise; 107 km (66 mi) S of Brisbane
- LGA(s): City of Gold Coast
- State electorate(s): Mudgeeraba
- Federal division(s): McPherson
Suburbs around Natural Bridge:
| Beechmont | Numinbah Valley | Springbrook |
| Binna Burra | Natural Bridge | Springbrook |
| Limpinwood (NSW) | Numinbah (NSW) | Numinbah (NSW) |

Natural Bridge is a rural locality in the City of Gold Coast, Queensland, Australia. It borders New South Wales. In the 2021 census, Natural Bridge had a population of 90 people.

== Geography ==
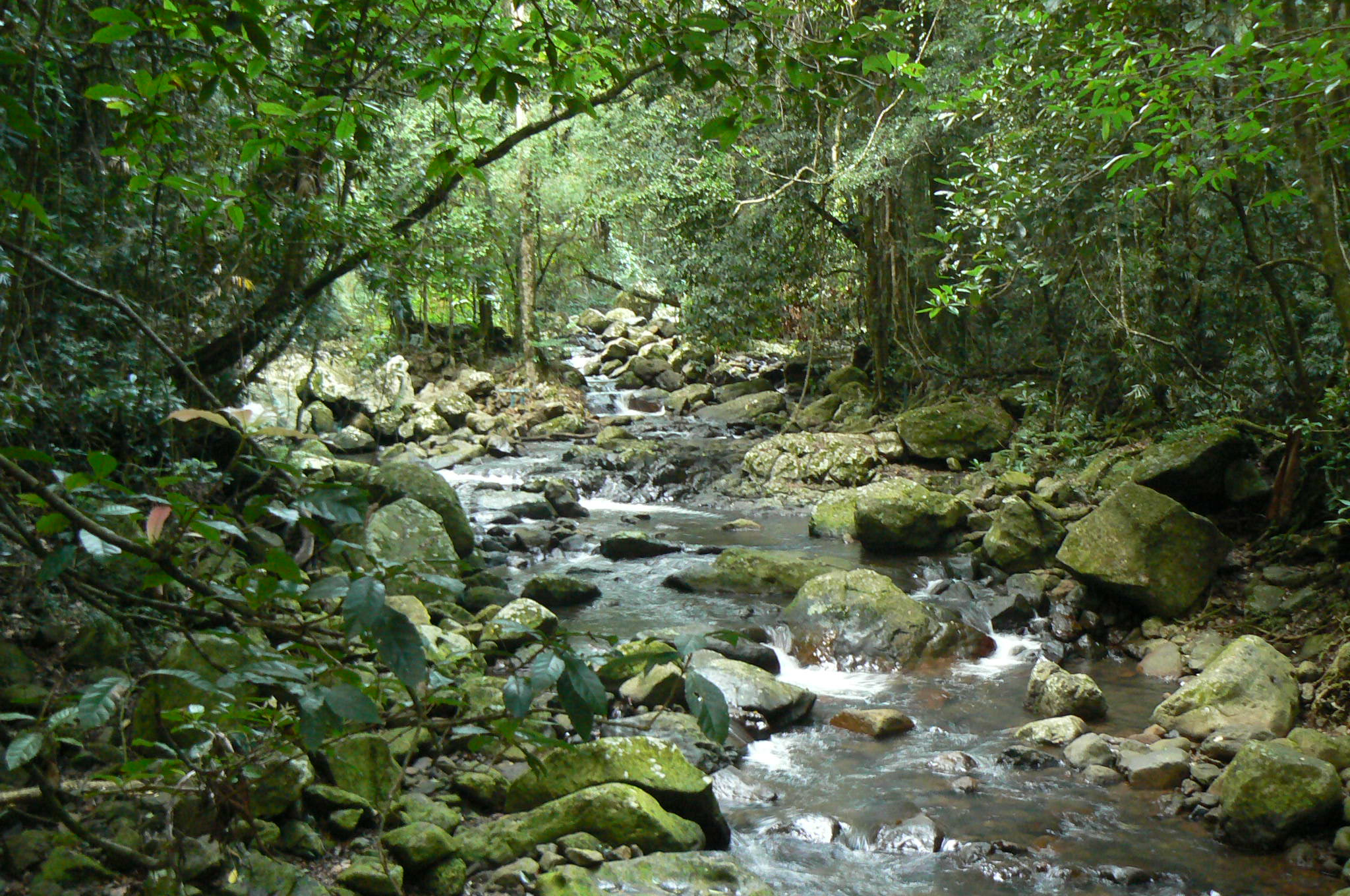
Cave Creek, 2016

Natural Bridge is in the far south-west of the City of Gold Coast in South East Queensland. Its name is taken from a natural rock arch in Springbrook National Park. A waterfall along Cave Creek, a tributary of the Nerang River flows through the arch. Natural Bridge is located at the southern extent of the Nerang River valley on the southern border with New South Wales, between the Springbrook plateau and Binna Burra in the Scenic Rim Region.

The western half of Natural Bridge is protected within Lamington National Park. The rugged landscape here is dotted with waterfalls, lookouts and peaks rising above 1,100 metres. The valley is traversed along its length via the Nerang–Murwillumbah Road which continues south.

== History ==
Numinbah Upper State School opened on 31 January 1939. In 1957 it was renamed Natural Bridge State School. It closed on 13 December 1991. The school was located at 3160 Nerang Murwillumbah Road (28.2203°S 153.2349°E).

During 2020 and 2021, the Queensland borders were closed to most people due to the COVID-19 pandemic. Border crossing points were either closed or had a Queensland Police checkpoint to allow entry to only those people with an appropriate permit. The Nerang-Murwillumbah Road at Natural Bridge had a police checkpoint.

== Demographics ==
In the 2016 census, Natural Bridge had a population of 108 people.

In the 2021 census, Natural Bridge had a population of 90 people.

== Education ==
There are no schools in Natural Bridge. The nearest government primary school is Numinbah Valley State School in neighbouring Numinbah Valley to the north. The nearest government secondary school is Nerang State High School in Nerang to the north-east.

== Amenities ==
The Police Citizens Youth Club operates the Bornhoffen camp as a community-based group accommodation centre.

== Attractions ==
The Natural Bridge section of Springbrook National Park contains one of the largest glowworm colonies in Australia. In 2007, 280,000 people visited Natural Bridge.

== See also ==
- McPherson Range
- Scenic Rim
