= Mount Nathan, Queensland =

Mount Nathan
- Suburb
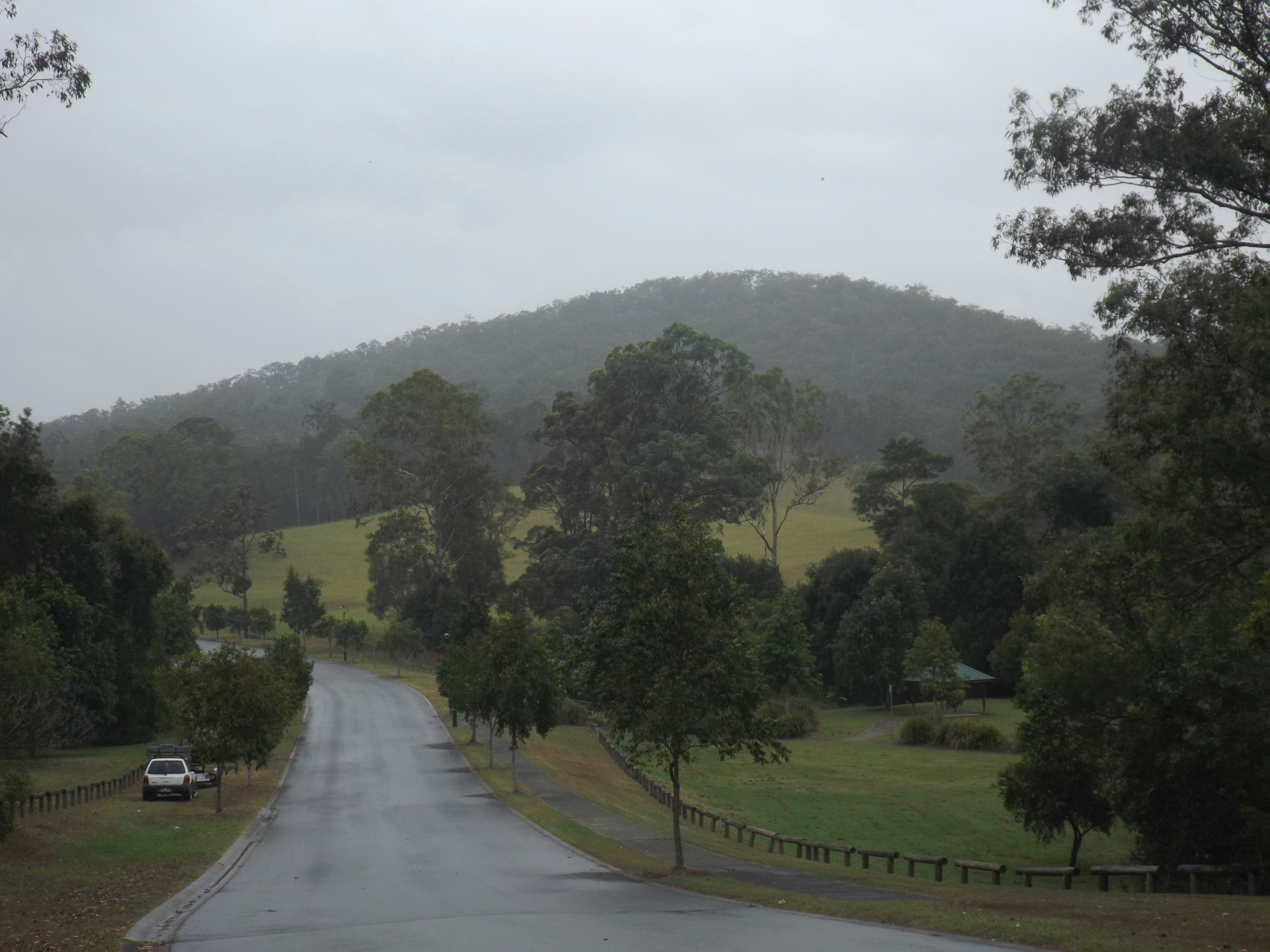
- Nathanvale Road, 2016

- Interactive map of Mount Nathan
- Coordinates: 27.9825°S 153.2675°E
- Country: Australia
- State: Queensland
- LGA: City of Gold Coast
- Location: 11.7 km (7.3 mi) NW of Nerang; 19.6 km (12.2 mi) W of Southport; 21.7 km (13.5 mi) WNW of Surfers Paradise; 70.3 km (43.7 mi) S of Brisbane

Government
  - State electorates: Gaven; Theodore
  - Federal division: Wright

Area
  - Total: 14.6 km^{2} (5.6 sq mi)

Population
  - Total: 1,375 (2021 census)
  - Density: 94.2/km^{2} (243.9/sq mi)
- Time zone: UTC+10:00 (AEST)
- Postcode: 4211
Suburbs around Mount Nathan
Guanaba	Guanaba	Maudsland
Clagiraba	Mount Nathan	Nerang
Clagiraba	Advancetown	Nerang

Mount Nathan is a rural locality in the City of Gold Coast, Queensland, Australia. In the 2021 census, Mount Nathan had a population of 1,375 people.

== Geography ==
Mount Nathan is situated in the Gold Coast hinterland in South East Queensland.

Mount Nathan Road / Beaudesert-Nerang Road (State Route 90) runs along the eastern boundary, and then passes through from north-east to west, a major passage to Scenic Rim Region.

Nerang–Murwillumbah Road (State Route 97) runs along a part of the south-eastern boundary.

== History ==
Silkwood Steiner School opened in 1997.

== Demographics ==
In the 2016 census, Mount Nathan recorded a population of 1,214 people, 49.7% female and 50.3% male. The median age of the Mount Nathan population was 41 years, 3 years above the national median of 38, with 76.1% of people having been born in Australia. The other top responses for country of birth were England 6.5%, New Zealand 5.0%, South Africa 0.9%, USA 0.8% and Sri Lanka 0.7%. 91.6% of people spoke only English at home; the next most common languages were Mandarin (0.5%), Japanese (0.4%), German and French (0.3%).

In the 2021 census, Mount Nathan had a population of 1,375 people.

== Education ==
Silkwood Steiner School is a private primary and secondary (Prep-12) school for boys and girls at 27 & 39 Shepherd Hill Lane (28.0033°S 153.2911°E). In 2017, the school had an enrolment of 575 students with 44 teachers (41 full-time equivalent) and 39 non-teaching staff (32 full-time equivalent).

There are no government schools in Mount Nathan. The nearest government primary schools are St Bernard State School in Tamborine Mountain to the west, Gaven State School in Oxenford to the north-east, and Nerang State School in neighbouring Nerang to the east. The nearest government secondary school is Nerang State High School in Nerang to the east.
