= Electoral district of Theodore =

State electoral district of Queensland, Australia

Theodore Queensland—Legislative Assembly
- Map of the electoral district of Theodore, 2017
- State: Queensland
- Dates current: 2017–present
- MP: Mark Boothman
- Party: Liberal National Party
- Namesake: Ted Theodore
- Electors: 35,641 (2020)
- Area: 106 km^{2} (40.9 sq mi)
- Demographic: Outer-metropolitan
- Coordinates: 27.927°S 153.2716°E
Electorates around Theodore:
Coomera	Coomera	Broadwater
Scenic Rim	Theodore	Bonney
Scenic Rim	Mudgeeraba	Gaven

Theodore is an electoral district of the Legislative Assembly in the Australian state of Queensland. It was created in the 2017 redistribution, and was won at the 2017 election by Mark Boothman. It is named after former Queensland Premier, Ted Theodore. From results of the most recent election, Theodore is a marginal seat for the Liberal National Party with a margin of 3.7%.

== Geography ==
Located on the Gold Coast, taking in parts of the abolished district of Albert, Theodore consists of the suburbs (whole or in part) of Coomera, Upper Coomera, Oxenford, Helensvale, Maudsland, Wongawallan, Pacific Pines, Guanaba, Clagiraba and Mount Nathan.

== Members for Theodore ==
Member	Party	Term
Mark Boothman	Liberal National	2017–present

== Election results ==
2024 Queensland state election: Theodore
Party	Candidate	Votes	%	±%
Liberal National	Mark Boothman	15,875	49.6	+5.4
Labor	Rita Anwari	8,600	26.9	−11.3
One Nation	Cassandra Duffill	2,815	8.8	+1.7
Greens	Andrew Stimson	2,350	7.4	+0.4
Animal Justice	Chloe Snyman	1,412	4.4	+4.4
Family First	Eleanor McAlpine	928	2.9	+2.9
Total formal votes		31,980	95.3	
Informal votes		1,564	4.7	
Turnout		33,544		
Two-party-preferred result
Liberal National	Mark Boothman	20,137	63.0	+9.6
Labor	Rita Anwari	11,843	37.0	−9.6
Liberal National hold		Swing	+9.6	

== See also ==
- Electoral districts of Queensland
- Members of the Queensland Legislative Assembly by year
- Category:Members of the Queensland Legislative Assembly by name
