= The Grand Golf Club =

Golf club in Australia

- Location of the golf course in Queensland
- 28°00′58″S 153°18′23″E

Club information
- Location: Gilston, Gold Coast, South East Queensland, Australia
- Established: 1997
- Type: Private
- Tournaments: Australian Open (2001)
- Website: www.thegrandgolfclub.com.au
- Designed by: Greg Norman
- Par: 72
- Length: 6,209 metres (20,371 ft) (Open)

The Grand Golf Club is a privately–owned and membership–based golf club located in the suburb of Gilston in the Gold Coast hinterland of South East Queensland, Australia. While the street address is located in Gilston, the course is located on the opposite side of the Nerang River in Advancetown. It hosted the Australian Open in 2001, won by Stuart Appleby, an Australian.

The Grand Golf Club has its entrance at 364 Gilston Road, Gilston. Most of the course is in neighbouring Advancetown, accessed by a bridge over the Nerang River.

This private club has a 19-hole golf course designed by Greg Norman at a cost of A$30 million for its then Japanese owners. The course opened in 1990; however with no funds available for the daily operation of the course, it closed in dramatic circumstances after just one day. The course stayed untouched for five years and became unkempt and overgrown before a consortium of Australian business people acquired the course and established The Grand Golf Club. After 18 months of restoration, led by Norman, the course was re-opened in 1997 by Greg Norman. In 2004 and again in 2006 the course was ranked by Golf Australia within the top 35 golf courses in Australia.

== See also ==
- Golf in Australia
- Sports in Queensland
