= Guanaba =

- Suburb
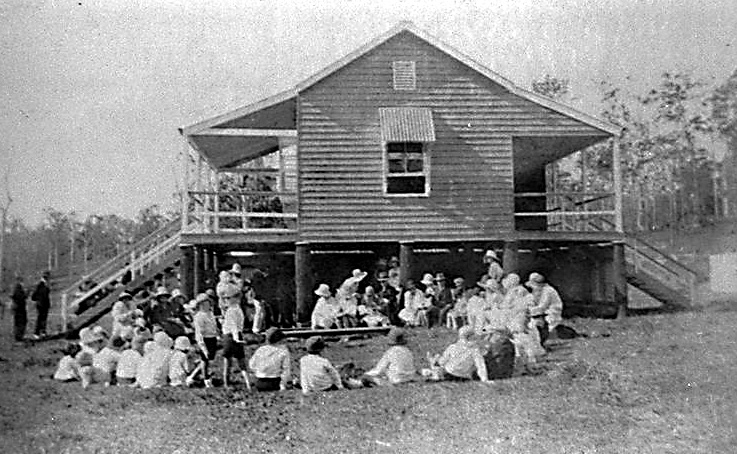
- Official opening of Guanaba State School, June 1930

- Interactive map of Guanaba
- Coordinates: 27.9375°S 153.2411°E
- Country: Australia
- State: Queensland
- City: Gold Coast
- LGA: City of Gold Coast
- Location: 25.4 km (15.8 mi) WNW of Southport; 27.5 km (17.1 mi) WNW of Surfers Paradise; 72.3 km (44.9 mi) SSE of Brisbane CBD

Government
  - State electorate: Theodore
  - Federal division: Wright

Area
  - Total: 22.1 km^{2} (8.5 sq mi)

Population
  - Total: 852 (2021 census)
  - Density: 38.55/km^{2} (99.85/sq mi)
- Time zone: UTC+10:00 (AEST)
- Postcode: 4210
Suburbs around Guanaba
Tamborine Mountain	Wongawallan	Upper Coomera
Tamborine Mountain	Guanaba	Maudsland
Tamborine Mountain	Clagiraba	Mount Nathan

Guanaba is a semi-rural locality in the City of Gold Coast, Queensland, Australia. In the 2021 census, Guanaba had a population of 852 people.

== Geography ==
The locality consists of small acreages focused around the equestrian community.

The eastern boundary of Guanaba follows the Coomera River. Tamborine National Park occupies a section in the west where elevations reach to around 40 metres (130 ft) above sea level.

== History ==
Guanaba State School was established circa March 1930 using a school building relocated from the former Carrara State School in 1929. It was officially opened on Arbor Day circa June 1930. It closed circa 1942.

The first polo club on the Gold Coast was established at Guanaba in 1974. Following the sale of the property in 2019, it became a private luxury resort.

In 2005, the set for the fictional town of Ambrose in the 2005 horror film House of Wax was constructed in Gunanba off Hollindale Road.

== Demographics ==
In the 2011 census, Guanaba recorded a population of 798 people, 49.6% female and 50.4% male. The median age of the Guanaba near population was 43 years, 6 years above the national median of 37. 74.1% of people living in Guanaba were born in Australia. The other top responses for country of birth were England 7.5%, New Zealand 4.6%, Netherlands 1.5%, Germany 1.3%, Ireland 0.9%. 91.7% of people spoke only English at home; the next most common languages were 1% Mandarin, 0.8% Dutch, 0.6% German, 0.4% French, 0.4% Greek.

In the 2016 census, Guanaba had a population of 793 people.

In the 2021 census, Guanaba had a population of 852 people.

== Education ==
There are no schools in Guanaba. The nearest government primary schools are:

- St Bernard State School in neighbouring Tamborine Mountain to the south-west
- Highland Reserve State School in neighbouring Upper Coomera to the north-east
- Gaven State School in Oxenford to the north-east

The nearest government secondary schools are:

- Tamborine Mountain State High School in neighbouring Tamborine Mountain to the south-west
- Upper Coomera State College in neighbouring Upper Coomera to the north-east
- Pacific Pines State High School in Pacific Pines to the east
