= Hinze Dam =

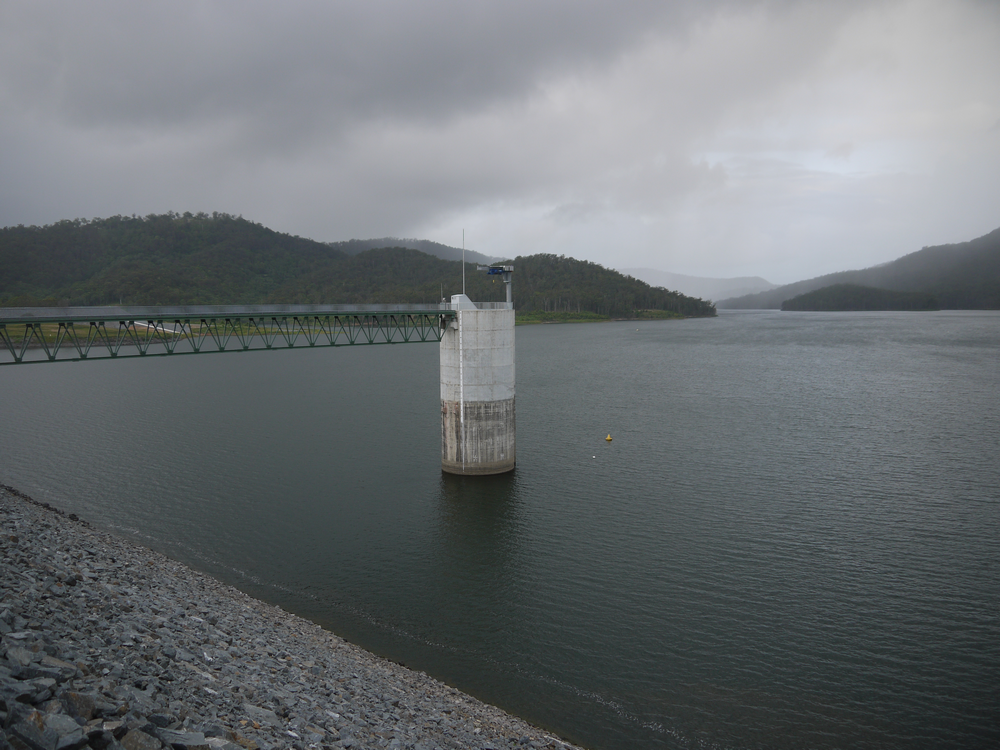
- Spillway tower of the dam, following Stage 3 upgrade

- Location of the dam in Queensland
- Interactive map of Hinze Dam
- Country: Australia
- Location: South East Queensland
- Coordinates: 28°02′58″S 153°17′04″E
- Purpose: Potable water supply; Flood mitigation
- Status: Operational
- Opening date: 1976 (Stage 1); 1989 (Stage 2); 2011 (Stage 3)
- Operator: Seqwater

Dam and spillways
- Type of dam: Embankment dam
- Impounds: Nerang River
- Height (foundation): 78.4 m (257 ft)
- Length: 750 m (2,460 ft)
- Elevation at crest: 94.5 m (310 ft) AHD
- Width (crest): 8 m (26 ft)
- Dam volume: 4,261×10^{3} m^{3} (150.5×10^{6} cu ft)
- Spillways: 1
- Spillway type: Uncontrolled
- Spillway length: 73.6 m (241 ft)
- Spillway capacity: 550 m^{3}/s (19,000 cu ft/s)

Reservoir
- Creates: Advancetown Lake
- Total capacity: 310,730 ML (251,910 acre⋅ft)
- Catchment area: 207 km^{2} (80 sq mi)
- Surface area: 1,505 ha (3,720 acres)
- Normal elevation: 72 m (236 ft) AHD
- Website seqwater.com.au

The Hinze Dam is a rock and earth-fill embankment dam across the Nerang River, in the Gold Coast hinterland of South East Queensland, Australia. The main purpose of the dam is for potable water supply of the Gold Coast region. The impounded reservoir is called Advancetown Lake.

Initially called the Advancetown Dam, in c. 1979 the dam was renamed in honour of local pioneers Carl and Johanna Hinze, grandparents of Queensland politician Russ Hinze. Carl and Johanna Hinze lived in the valley that was flooded by the dam. The dam is almost always full, and has reached 96% of capacity even during dry spells.

== Location and features ==
When established in 1976, the dam flooded the original settlement of Advancetown, 15 kilometres (9.3 mi) south-west of Nerang immediately downstream of the confluence of the Nerang River and Little Nerang Creek.

The earthfill dam structure is 108 metres (354 ft) high and 1,850 metres (6,070 ft) long. The 4,261-thousand-cubic-metre (150.5×10^{6} cu ft) dam wall holds back the 310,730-megalitre (251,910 acre⋅ft) reservoir when at full capacity. From a catchment area of 207 square kilometres (80 sq mi) that includes the Numinbah Valley and Springbrook Plateau, with most being contained within state forests and national parks, the dam creates Advancetown Lake, with a surface area of 1,500 hectares (3,700 acres). The uncontrolled un-gated spillway is located at 82 metres (269 ft) AHD, and has a discharge capacity of 550 cubic metres per second (19,000 cu ft/s). Initially managed by the Gold Coast City Council, the dam has been managed by Seqwater since 2008.

Since 2011, the dam has also provided the benefit of flood mitigation to populated areas along the Nerang River downstream of the dam.

=== Construction ===
The Southport Town Council planned the dam in 1947. It was completed in 1976 and expanded in 1989 and 2011.

Stage One was completed in 1976, and provided 42,400 megalitres (34,400 acre⋅ft) of potable water storage and supply.

Stage Two was completed in 1989, when storage of potable water was increased to 161,070 megalitres (130,580 acre⋅ft), at a cost of $42 million. The works involved raising the main embankment, spillway and intake towers by approximately 18 metres (59 ft) to create a surface area of 9.72 square kilometres (3.75 sq mi).

In 2004 the Gold Coast City Council resolved to construct Stage 3 of the dam and it commenced on 7 January 2008, when the dam reached full capacity and was completed on 19 December 2011 at a cost of $395 million. The Stage 3 works increased the height of the dam wall from 93.5 metres (307 ft) to 108 metres (354 ft), and increased the reservoir capacity from 161,070 megalitres (130,580 acre⋅ft) to 310,730 megalitres (251,910 acre⋅ft), with the added purpose of flood mitigation. Stage 3 construction was completed by the Hinze Dam Alliance, a joint venture between Seqwater, with private sector partners URS Corporation, Sinclair Knight Merz and Thiess. The additional works with a higher dam wall provided 4,500 homes below the dam wall with flood protection from a 1974 Brisbane style flood event.

== Recreation ==
The eastern boat ramp is located in Mudgeeraba and features a craft and paddle launching platform as well as toilets and bin facilities. The western boat ramp, located in Springbrook, contains the same amenities with a smaller car park. In 2012 a body was discovered by fishermen.

The Advancetown Lake is a popular recreational facility for Gold Coast residents. Since the Stage 3 upgrade, recreational activities allowed include walking, electric or manual-powered boating, fishing, biking and horse riding. The facilities are open from 6 am to 6 pm daily. No camping is permitted around the lake. Dogs are also not permitted, while swimming has been strongly discouraged. An interpretive centre was opened on 19 December 2011, along with new parking, walking trails, toilet facilities and barbecue areas.

The final design of the dam was criticised in the media and by residents and politicians, some describing it as a "concrete bunker". The criticism arose because of a reduction in playground, boating and barbecue facilities; the banning of dogs; the extensive use of concrete; and because many of the facilities are either far from the water's edge or below the dam wall with no water views.

The Advancetown Lake has two boat ramps, one on the western and another on the eastern side.

- Wood barbecues
- Electric barbecues
- Toilets
- Car parking
- Shaded seating areas
- Boat ramps
- Playground equipment
- Kiosk
- Fresh-water fishing
- Rowing course
- Walking tracks
- Mountain biking – Green and Blue level single track
- Horse trails

=== Fishing ===
The dam is stocked with Mary River cod, silver perch, golden perch, southern saratoga and bass, while spangled perch are also present naturally. Banded grunter have been found in the lake and being illegally introduced, it is recommended that, if caught, they should be destroyed. A Gold Coast City Council permit is required to fish in the dam. A Queensland State Government Stocked Impoundment Permit is not required.

From December 2018, Queensland Health advise not to consume fish from Hinze Dam due to elevated levels of mercury in recent fish samples.

=== 2018 Commonwealth Games ===
The Gold Coast hosted the 2018 Commonwealth Games. The area surrounding the Hinze Dam was originally proposed as the location for the mountain bike competition. A new course was constructed to meet international competition requirements. Some government representatives as well as some mountain bikers have sought to have the competition moved away to the unsecured trails at Nerang State Forest. The Gold Coast Mountain Bike Club maintain the course and sometimes host a race on the circuit the first Sunday of each month.

== Gallery ==
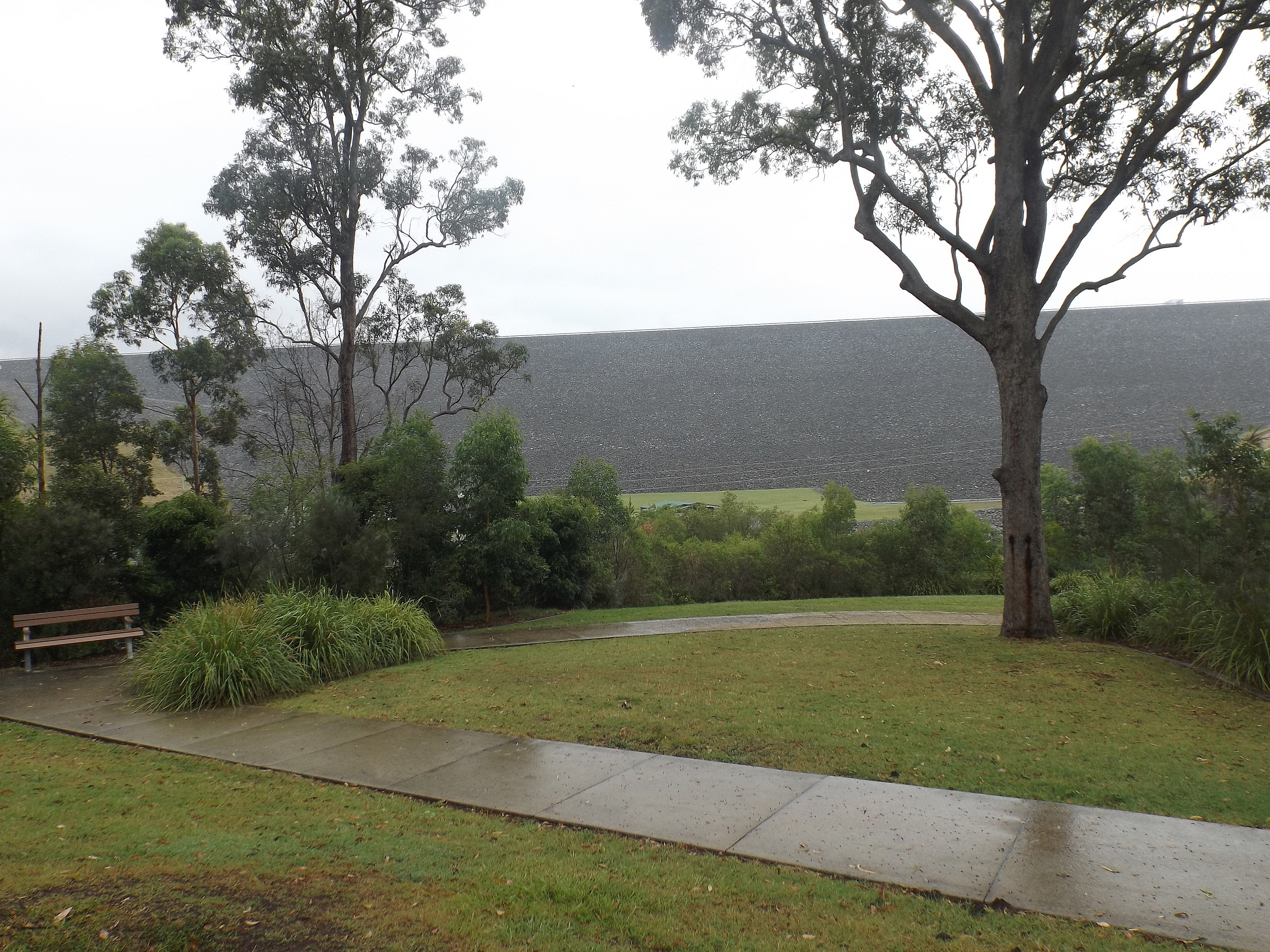
The dam wall in 2016

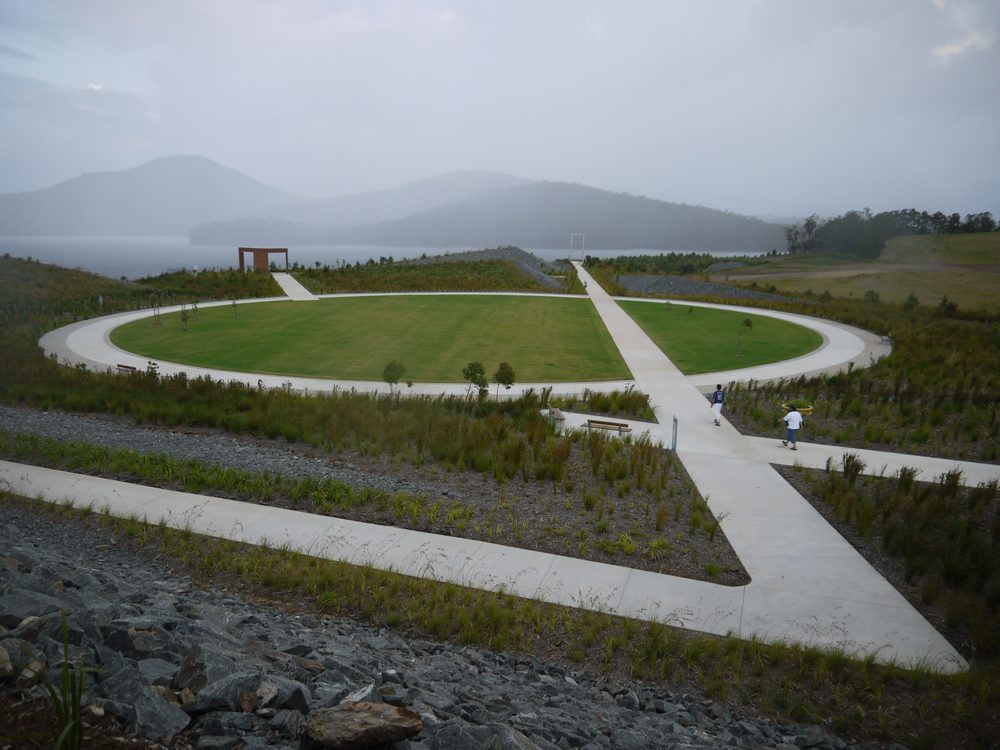
Open space, following completion of Stage 3 upgrade

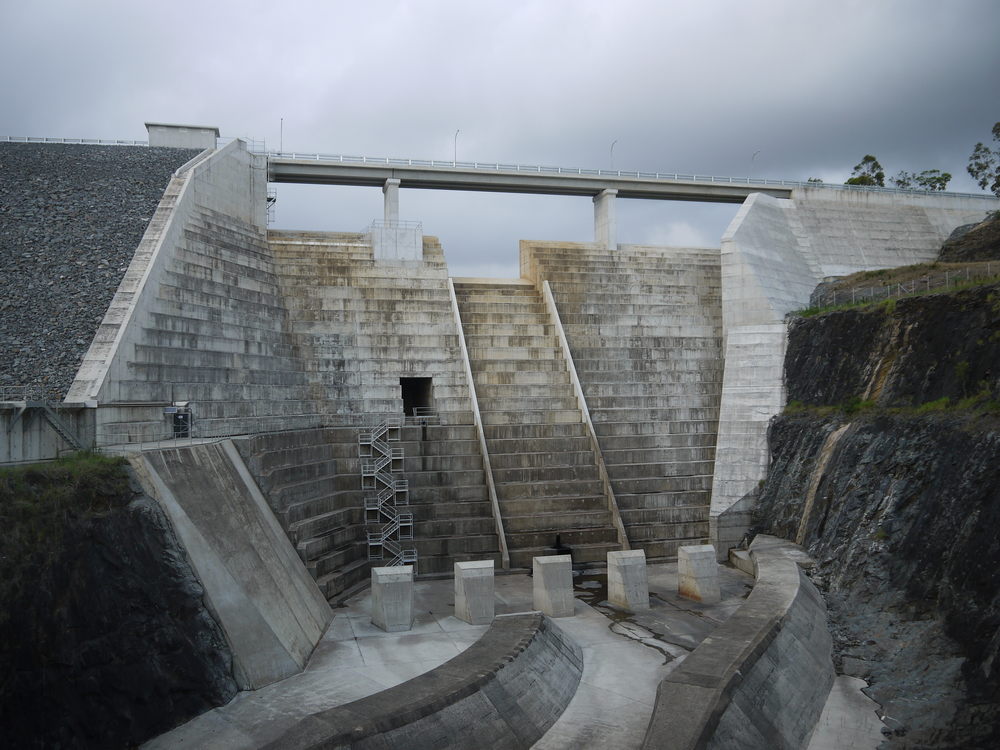
The spillway, following Stage 3 upgrade

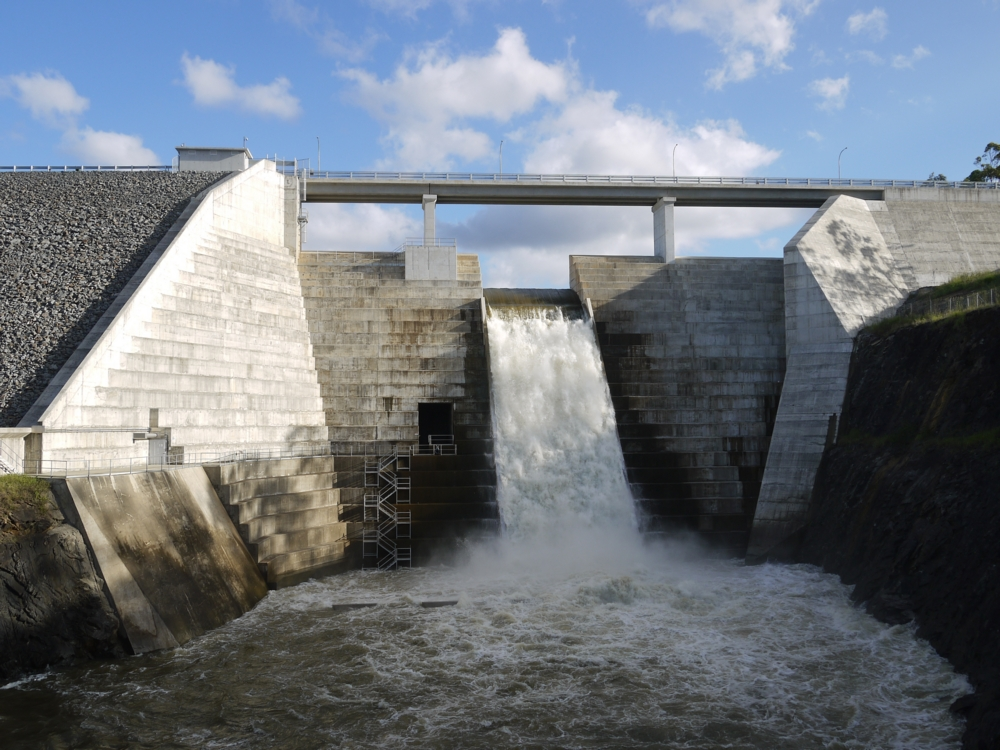
The spillway overflows for the first time since the Stage 3 upgrade was completed, after heavy rain from Cyclone Oswald in 2013

== See also ==
- Sports on the Gold Coast, Queensland
- List of dams in Queensland
