= Advancetown, Queensland =

Advancetown
- Suburb
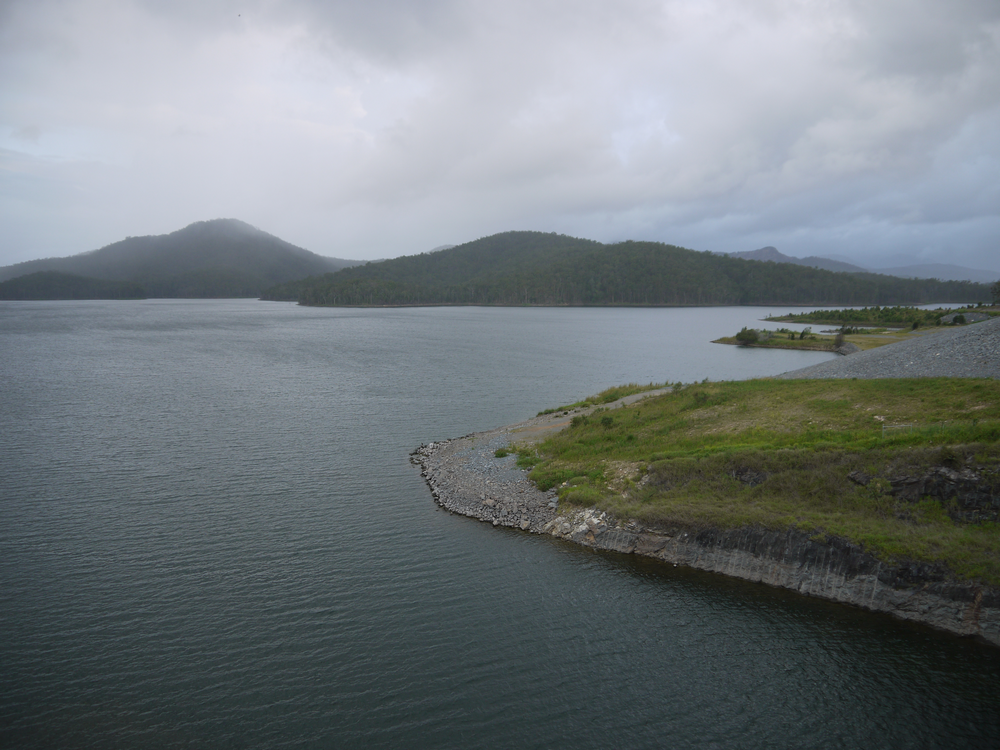
- Hinze Dam after the 3rd Stage completion

- Interactive map of Advancetown
- Coordinates: 28.0719°S 153.2791°E
- Country: Australia
- State: Queensland
- City: City of Gold Coast
- LGA: City of Gold Coast
- Location: 7.9 km (4.9 mi) SW of Nerang; 18.4 km (11.4 mi) WSW of Southport; 19.4 km (12.1 mi) WSW of Surfers Paradise; 79.3 km (49.3 mi) SSE of Brisbane

Government
  - State electorate: Mudgeeraba
  - Federal divisions: Moncrieff; Wright

Area
  - Total: 63.6 km^{2} (24.6 sq mi)

Population
  - Total: 528 (2021 census)
  - Density: 8.302/km^{2} (21.50/sq mi)
- Time zone: UTC+10:00 (AEST)
- Postcode: 4211
Suburbs around Advancetown
Clagiraba	Mount Nathan; Nerang	Gilston
Lower Beechmont	Advancetown	Tallai; Mudgeeraba
Beechmont	Numinbah Valley	Neranwood

Advancetown is a rural outer locality in the City of Gold Coast, Queensland, Australia. In the 2021 census, Advancetown had a population of 528 people.

== Geography ==
Advancetown is situated in the Gold Coast hinterland. Its mountainous terrain facilitated the construction of the Hinze Dam (28.0501°S 153.2806°E) which impounds the Nerang River (28.1063°S 153.2476°E) and Little Nerang Creek (28.1201°S 153.3024°E) to create Advancetown Lake (28.0580°S 153.2844°E). The lake is the dominant feature in the south of the locality; it supplies water for most of the Gold Coast.

Two named peaks within the locality are:

- Mudgeeraba in the south-east of the locality (28.0833°S 153.3166°E) at 240 metres (790 ft) above sea level
- Pages Pinnacle in the south (28.1061°S 153.265°E) at 398 metres (1,306 ft) above

The northern part of the locality, downstream from the dam, is lower and flatter and has mixed use with rural residential areas and rural areas (mostly grazing on native vegetation). One landmark in this area is Latimers Crossing, a crossing point of the Nerang River between Advancetown and Gilston (28.0260°S 153.2978°E).

Nerang–Murwillumbah Road (State Route 97) runs through from north to south.

== Climate ==
Advancetown has a humid subtropical climate (Cfa), with warm to hot, humid summers and mild, comparatively drier winters. At Hinze Dam, mean maximum temperatures range from 20.8 °C (69.4 °F) in July to 29.0 °C (84.2 °F) in January, while mean minimum temperatures range from 10.2 °C (50.4 °F) in July to 20.5 °C (68.9 °F) in February. Annual rainfall averages 1,404.7 mm (55.30 in), with a pronounced summer maximum and lower rainfall during winter and early spring. The area averages 73.5 clear days and 80.1 cloudy days annually, with clear conditions most frequent during winter and cloudy conditions most frequent during summer. Temperature extremes recorded at Hinze Dam have ranged from 2.8 °C (37.0 °F) to 40.9 °C (105.6 °F).

Climate data for Hinze Dam
Month	Jan	Feb	Mar	Apr	May	Jun	Jul	Aug	Sep	Oct	Nov	Dec	Year
Record high °C (°F)	40.9 (105.6)	40.6 (105.1)	36.5 (97.7)	34.5 (94.1)	32.2 (90.0)	27.0 (80.6)	27.3 (81.1)	34.5 (94.1)	35.6 (96.1)	38.3 (100.9)	39.9 (103.8)	39.7 (103.5)	40.9 (105.6)
Mean daily maximum °C (°F)	29.0 (84.2)	28.7 (83.7)	27.7 (81.9)	25.6 (78.1)	23.4 (74.1)	21.1 (70.0)	20.8 (69.4)	22.2 (72.0)	24.9 (76.8)	26.4 (79.5)	27.4 (81.3)	28.5 (83.3)	25.5 (77.9)
Mean daily minimum °C (°F)	20.1 (68.2)	20.5 (68.9)	19.2 (66.6)	16.7 (62.1)	13.8 (56.8)	11.7 (53.1)	10.2 (50.4)	10.7 (51.3)	13.2 (55.8)	15.5 (59.9)	17.3 (63.1)	19.0 (66.2)	15.7 (60.3)
Record low °C (°F)	11.8 (53.2)	15.5 (59.9)	13.8 (56.8)	9.5 (49.1)	5.9 (42.6)	5.1 (41.2)	2.8 (37.0)	4.7 (40.5)	7.0 (44.6)	8.1 (46.6)	9.9 (49.8)	12.3 (54.1)	2.8 (37.0)
Average rainfall mm (inches)	195.1 (7.68)	197.6 (7.78)	179.8 (7.08)	117.7 (4.63)	128.0 (5.04)	78.1 (3.07)	52.5 (2.07)	46.4 (1.83)	46.4 (1.83)	85.2 (3.35)	121.0 (4.76)	159.6 (6.28)	1,404.7 (55.30)
Average rainy days	11.2	11.3	11.6	8.6	8.5	5.4	5.0	4.7	4.9	7.4	9.4	10.3	98.3
Average relative humidity (%)	63	67	64	61	58	56	50	48	51	56	60	61	58
Source: Bureau of Meteorology

== History ==
The mountain Mudgeeraba takes its name from the Bundjalung language words mudherri meaning sticky and ba meaning place, that is, a muddy place.

The mountain Pages Pinnacle is named after local land owner Sir Earle Christmas Grafton Page.

The area first attracted timber-cutters in the 1870s because of the abundant supply of good quality timber. In 1881 David Yuan established at saw mill and European settlement began. A small settlement sprang up as a rest point for the bullock teams hauling timber to the railway at Nerang. As late as the 1930s, there were still up to 24 bullock teams operating in the area.

In 1884, the first hotel was built by W. H. Turner called the Beechmont Hotel. In 1905, Ernest Belliss opened a hotel on the corner of Numinbah Road and a bullock road from Beechmont known as the Black Shoot; he called it the Advancetown Hotel. Belliss also donated land for the Advancetown school, which made the name endure. Belliss sold the hotel in March 1924 and the timber building burned down in July 1933. A new Advancetown Hotel was built and opened in February 1934.

Advancetown State School opened in 1909, but then closed in 1913. It reopened in 1918 but had temporary closures in 1921 and 1952. It closed permanently in 1960.

The Hinze Dam was completed in 1976 (Stage 1), and provided a storage of 42,400 megalitres (34,400 acre⋅ft) of water to surrounding residents. The dam was named in honour of local pioneers Carl and Johanna Hinze (grandparents of Queensland politician Russ Hinze) who lived in the valley that was flooded by the dam. The settlement of Advancetown including the school (which was closed by then) was lost under the dam's waters. As the settlement of Advancetown was gone, on 31 March 1979 the name Advancetown was dropped in favour of Latimer, after nearby Latimer Creek, but the name Advancetown was restored on 11 May 1985.

In 1989, Stage 2 of the dam was completed, increasing the storage to 161,070 ML (130,580 acre⋅ft) of water.

Advancetown was part of the Shire of Albert until it was amalgamated into the City of Gold Coast in 1995.

In 2011, Stage 3 of the dam was completed, increasing the storage to 310,730 ML (251,910 acre⋅ft) of water, at a cost of A$395,000,000.

== Demographics ==
In the 2011 census, Advancetown had a population of 352 people.

In the 2016 census, Advancetown had a population of 482 people.

In the 2021 census, Advancetown had a population of 528 people.

== Heritage listings ==
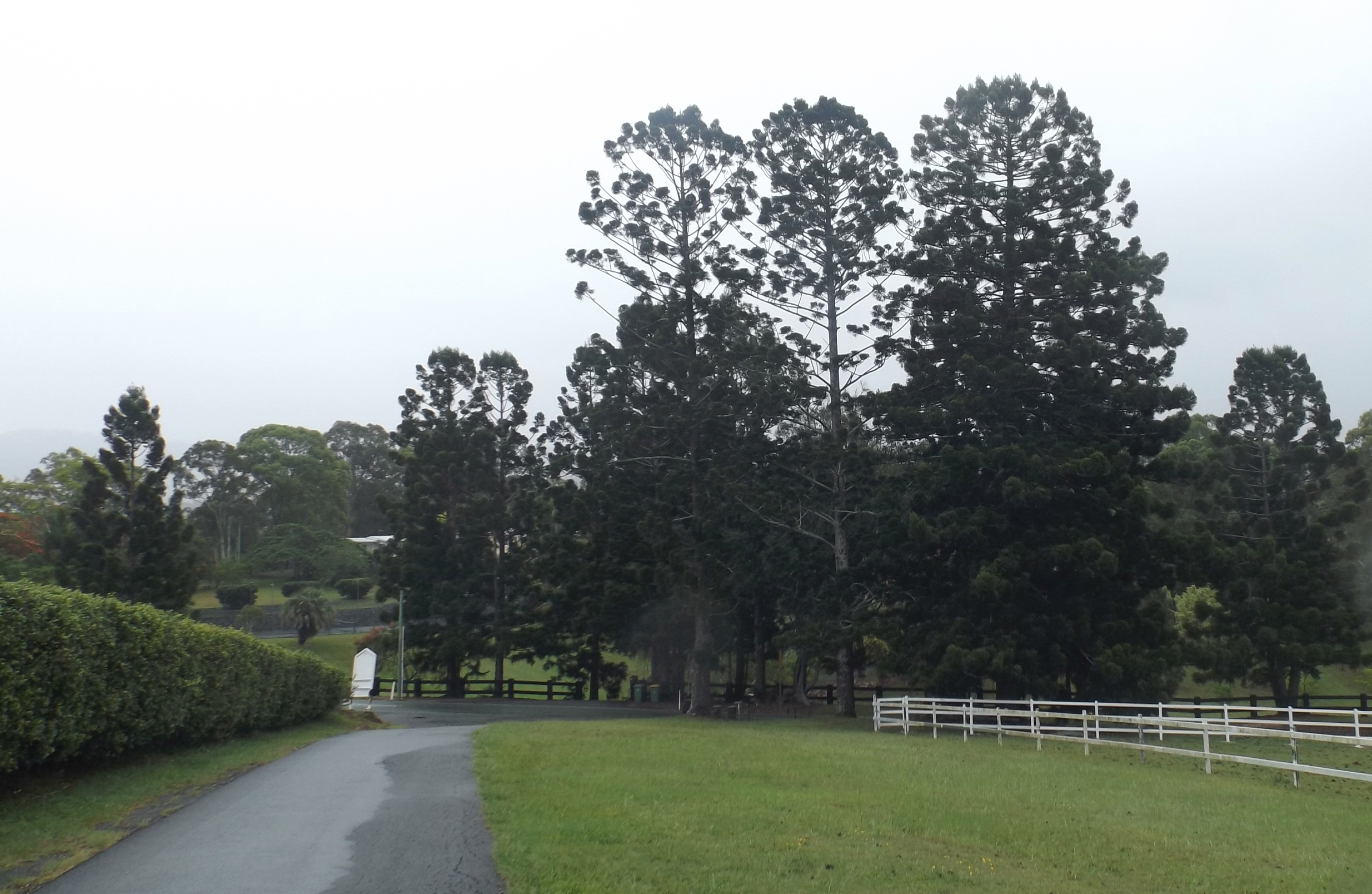
Avenue of Commemorative Trees is listed on the Gold Coast Local Heritage Register

There are a number of heritage sites in Advancetown, including:

- 163-179 Latimers Crossing Road: Avenue of Commemorative Trees

== Education ==
There are no schools in Advancetown. Given that the populated areas of the locality are in the north, the nearest government primary schools are Nerang State School in neighbouring Nerang to the north-east and Gilston State School in neighbouring Gilston to the east. The nearest government secondary school is Nerang State High School in Nerang.

== Sports ==
Although The Grand Golf Club has its entrance at 364 Gilston Road in neighbouring Gilston, most of the course is in Advancetown, accessed by a bridge over the Nerang River (28.0160°S 153.3065°E). This private club has a 19-hole golf course designed by Greg Norman.

== Attractions ==
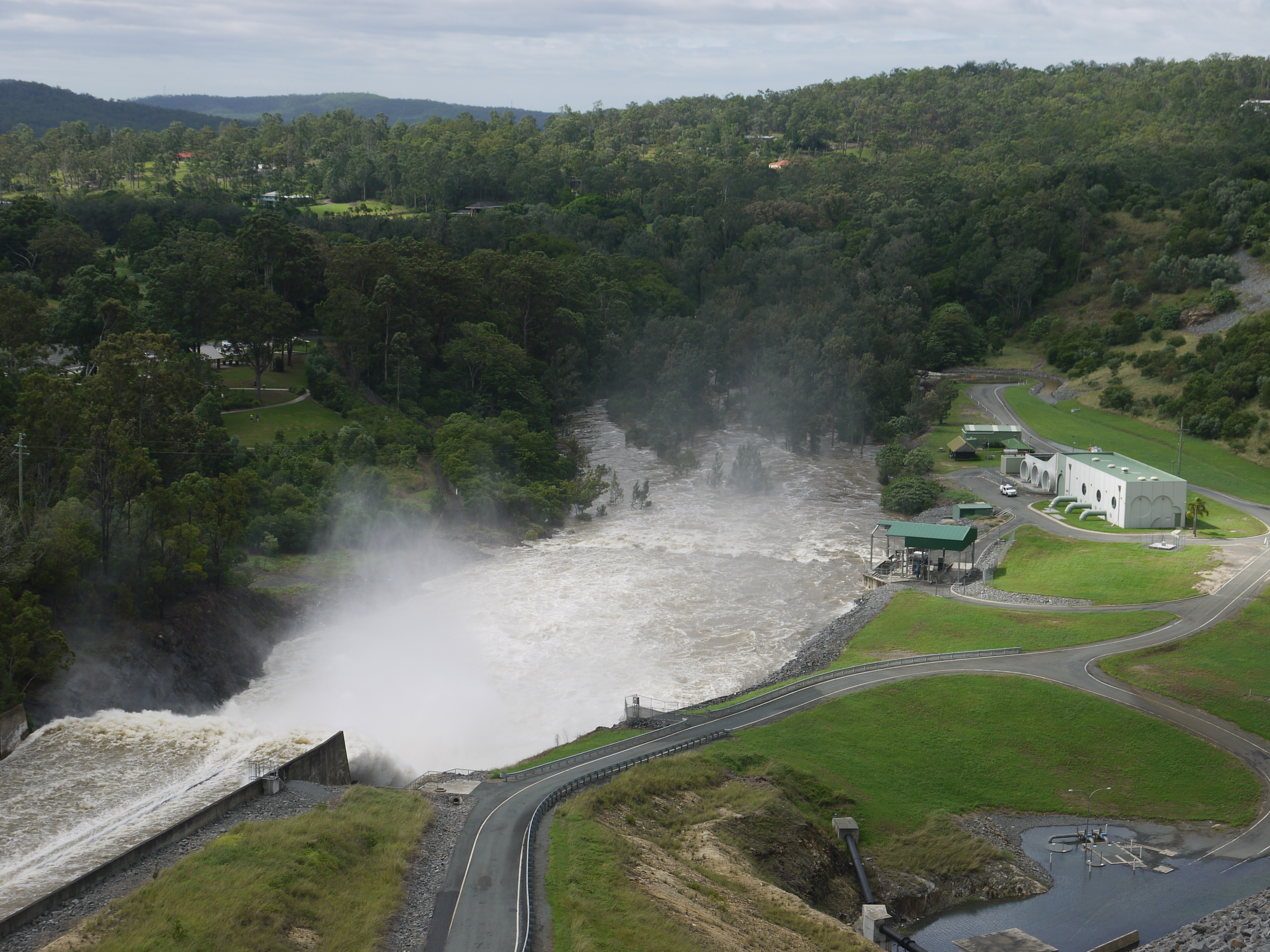
Nerang River below the Hinze Dam, 2017

The Hinze Dam offers a number of visitor attractions. Accessed from Advancetown Road at the top of dam wall (28.0505°S 153.2794°E) is a visitor centre with education displays, a cafe and parkland with picnic facilities. Below the spillway are picnic areas with barbeques (28.0457°S 153.2829°E). Across the spillway is a network of purpose-built mountain bike trails. In the two arms of the lake there are the eastern and western boat ramps for non-motorised boating and fishing (catch-and-release only due to mercury levels). The eastern boat ramp (28.0849°S 153.3107°E) is accessed from Range Road, while the western boat ramp (28.0707°S 153.2578°E) is accessed via Nerang Murwillumbah Road. There are also a number of walking trails.

== Climate ==
Advancetown has a humid subtropical climate (Köppen climate classification Cfa). There is a weather station located within Advancetown, at Hinze Dam. Record keeping commenced in 1974.

Climate data for Hinze Dam
Month	Jan	Feb	Mar	Apr	May	Jun	Jul	Aug	Sep	Oct	Nov	Dec	Year
Record high °C (°F)	40.9 (105.6)	40.6 (105.1)	36.5 (97.7)	34.5 (94.1)	32.2 (90.0)	27.0 (80.6)	27.3 (81.1)	34.5 (94.1)	35.6 (96.1)	38.3 (100.9)	39.9 (103.8)	39.7 (103.5)	40.9 (105.6)
Mean daily maximum °C (°F)	29.1 (84.4)	28.8 (83.8)	27.7 (81.9)	25.7 (78.3)	23.2 (73.8)	21.0 (69.8)	20.8 (69.4)	22.2 (72.0)	25.0 (77.0)	26.4 (79.5)	27.3 (81.1)	28.8 (83.8)	29.1 (84.4)
Mean daily minimum °C (°F)	20.2 (68.4)	20.5 (68.9)	19.2 (66.6)	16.8 (62.2)	13.8 (56.8)	11.6 (52.9)	10.2 (50.4)	10.6 (51.1)	13.3 (55.9)	15.5 (59.9)	17.4 (63.3)	19.2 (66.6)	10.2 (50.4)
Record low °C (°F)	11.8 (53.2)	15.5 (59.9)	13.8 (56.8)	9.5 (49.1)	5.9 (42.6)	5.1 (41.2)	2.8 (37.0)	4.7 (40.5)	7.0 (44.6)	8.1 (46.6)	9.9 (49.8)	12.3 (54.1)	2.8 (37.0)
Average precipitation mm (inches)	182.7 (7.19)	193.6 (7.62)	164.2 (6.46)	117.8 (4.64)	125.3 (4.93)	83.1 (3.27)	51.2 (2.02)	45.1 (1.78)	42.1 (1.66)	84.4 (3.32)	117.7 (4.63)	157.7 (6.21)	1,369.9 (53.93)
Average precipitation days	12.9	13.3	13.6	10.0	9.8	6.9	6.4	5.5	6.2	9.1	10.8	12.2	116.7
Source: Bureau of Meteorology

== See also ==
- List of Gold Coast suburbs
