= Maudsland, Queensland =

Maudsland
- Suburb
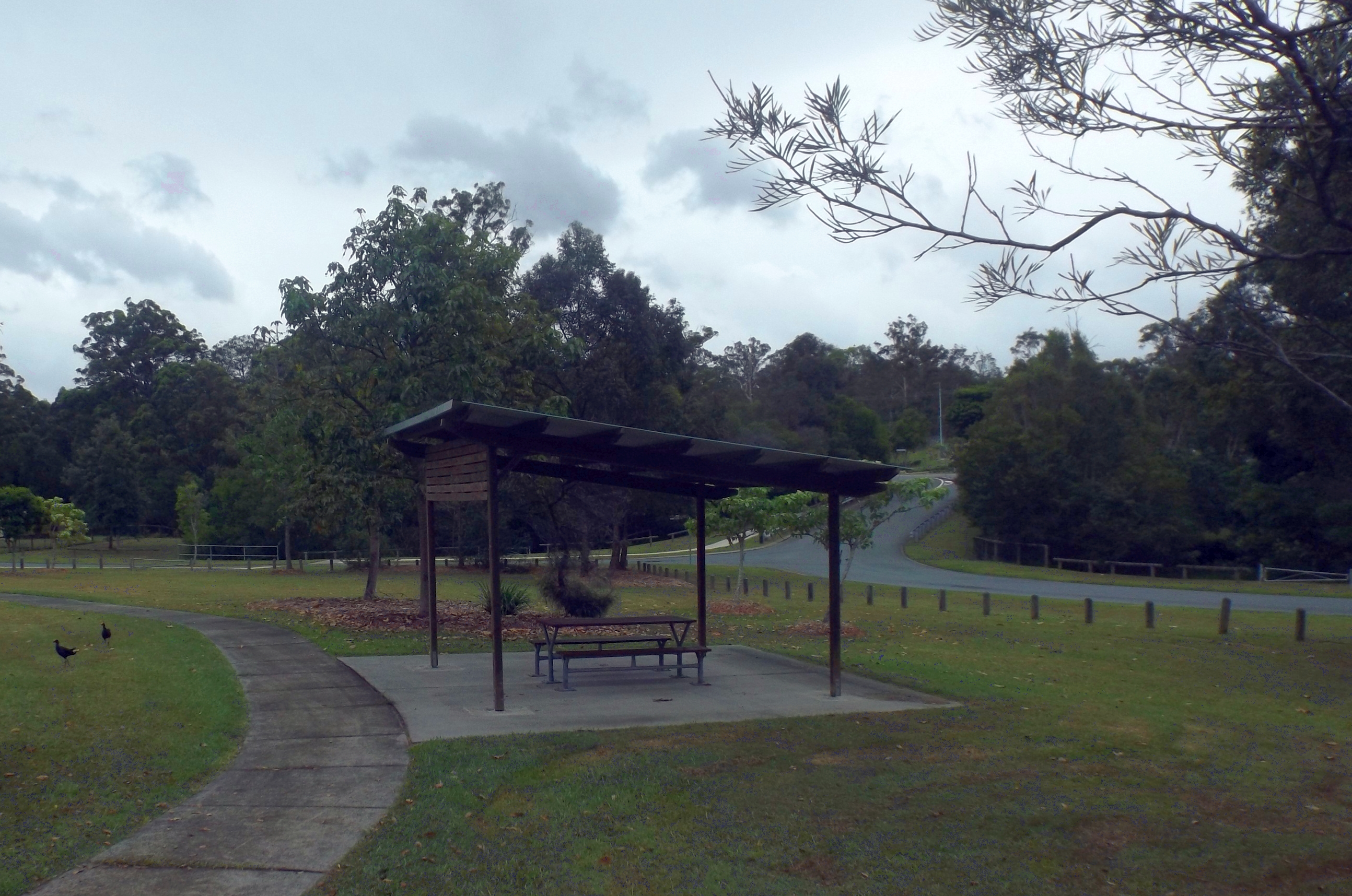
- Park along Tuxedo Junction Drive, 2016

- Interactive map of Maudsland
- Coordinates: 27.9408°S 153.2808°E
- Country: Australia
- State: Queensland
- LGA: City of Gold Coast
- Location: 19.4 km (12.1 mi) WNW of Southport; 22.6 km (14.0 mi) NW of Surfers Paradise; 65.7 km (40.8 mi) SSE of Brisbane CBD

Government
  - State electorate: Theodore
  - Federal division: Wright

Area
  - Total: 14.5 km^{2} (5.6 sq mi)

Population
  - Total: 8,073 (2021 census)
  - Density: 556.8/km^{2} (1,442/sq mi)
- Time zone: UTC+10:00 (AEST)
- Postcode: 4210
Suburbs around Maudsland
Upper Coomera	Oxenford	Oxenford
Guanaba	Maudsland	Pacific Pines
Mount Nathan	Mount Nathan	Nerang

Maudsland is a rural-residential locality in the north of the City of Gold Coast, Queensland, Australia. In the 2021 census, Maudsland had a population of 8,073 people.

Maudsland features acreage properties, a number of housing estates including acreage and neighbourhood ones. The suburb's postcode is 4210.

== Geography ==
The northern and north-east parts of the locality are suburban housing estates with the remainder of the locality has lower-density rural residential housing. There is a large undeveloped area in the more mountainous centre of the locality where unnamed peaks rise to 170 metres (560 ft).

== History ==
Maudsland Provisional School opened on 13 October 1879 under head teacher John William Scott and became a state school on 1 January 1909. It closed on 15 April 1963 and its remaining students and its buildings were transferred to Coomera State School. The school was at 542 Maudsland Road (27.9456°S 153.2701°E). The school grounds were converted to Cliff Bird Park by the Albert Shire Council.

Maudsland was connected to the telephone network in 1924.

The Maudsland Village Shopping Centre and an adjacent childcare centre were severely damaged by fire in August 2012. Neighbouring businesses including a liquor store and tavern were undamaged. The shopping centre reopened in 2013.

== Demographics ==
In the 2016 census, Maudsland had a population of 5,568 people.

In the 2021 census, Maudsland had a population of 8,073 people.

== Education ==
There are no schools in Maudsland. The nearest government primary schools are Park Lake State School in neighbouring Pacific Pines to the east and Gaven State School in neighbouring Oxenford to the north-east. The nearest government secondary schools are Pacific Pines State High School in neighbouring Pacific Pines to the east and Nerang State High School in neighbouring Nerang to the south-east.
