= Gilston, Queensland =

Gilston
- Suburb
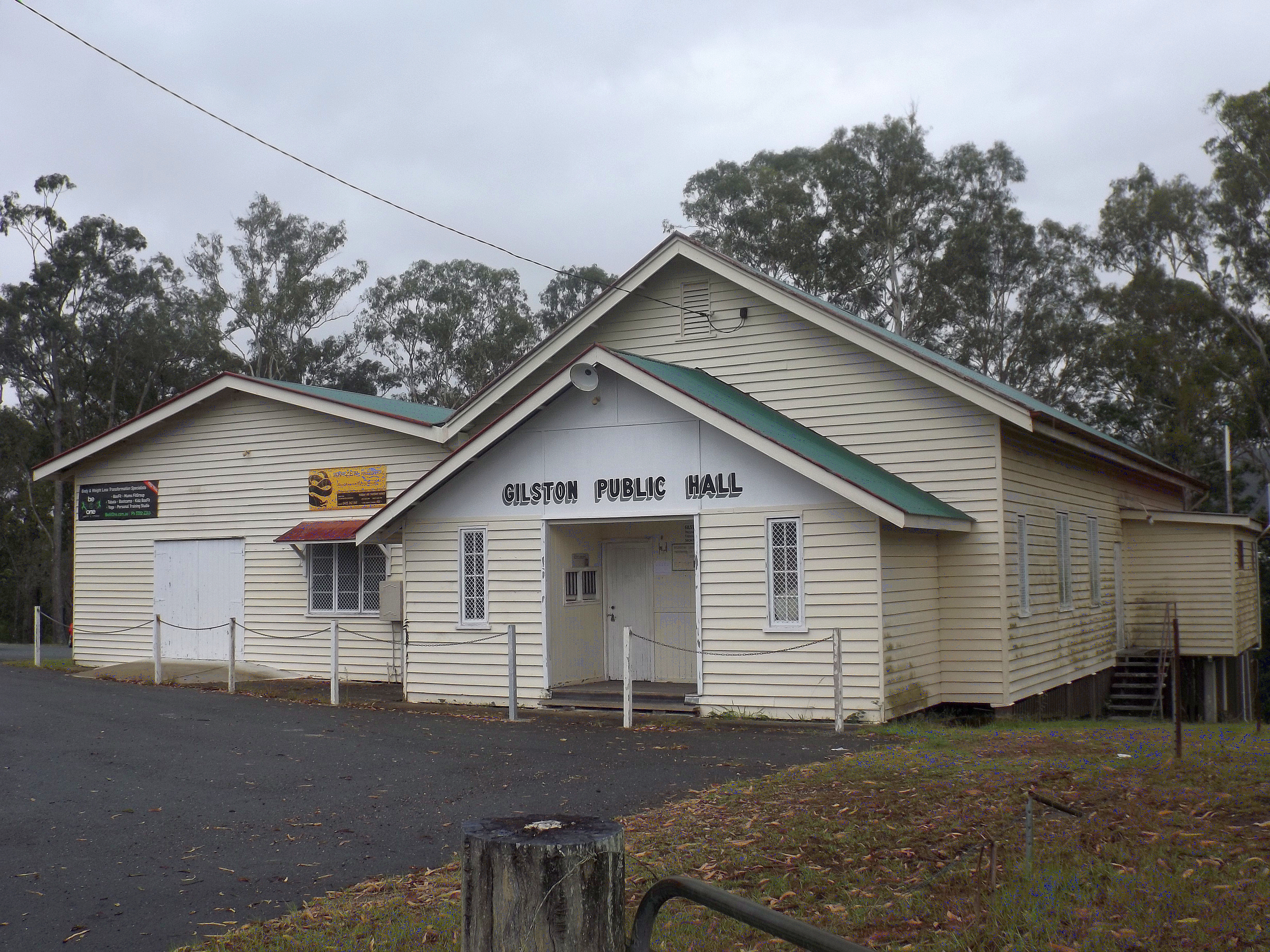
- Gilston Public Hall, 2016

- Interactive map of Gilston
- Coordinates: 28.03°S 153.3097°E
- Country: Australia
- State: Queensland
- City: City of Gold Coast
- LGA: City of Gold Coast
- Location: 9.0 km (5.6 mi) S of Nerang; 16.1 km (10.0 mi) SW of Southport; 17 km (11 mi) WSW of Surfers Paradise; 76.9 km (47.8 mi) SSE of Brisbane

Government
  - State electorates: Mudgeeraba; Gaven
  - Federal division: Wright

Area
  - Total: 9.5 km^{2} (3.7 sq mi)

Population
  - Total: 2,669 (2021 census)
  - Density: 280.9/km^{2} (728/sq mi)
- Time zone: UTC+10:00 (AEST)
- Postcode: 4211
Suburbs around Gilston
Advancetown	Nerang	Highland Park
Advancetown	Gilston	Worongary
Advancetown	Advancetown	Tallai

Gilston is a rural residential locality in the City of Gold Coast, Queensland, Australia. In the 2021 census, Gilston had a population of 2,669 people.

== Geography ==
The western boundary of the suburb is marked by the Nerang River.

== History ==
Settlement began in the 1860s with dairying and timber being the main industries. Mr Bryant, a local storekeeper, named the district Gilston after Gilston in England.

Nerang Upper Provisional School opened on 1 June 1881. In 1903, it became Gilston Provisional School. In 1908 it became Gilston State School. The school was at 636 Gilston Road (28.0334°S 153.3057°E) until 1985 when increasing enrolments resulted in a new school campus being constructed in Worongary Street. In 1996, funds were raised to relocate the original school building onto the new campus.

The first telephone office opened in March 1923.

After engaged in fundraising since March 1930, the Gilson Hall was finally opened on Friday 16 June 1933 by Thomas Plunkett, junior, Member of the Queensland Legislative Assembly for the Albert. The hall was erected on the site of the old Lutheran church at 471 Gilston Road and was 60 by 30 feet (18.3 m × 9.1 m) with a stage and dressing rooms.

Since 2014, Gilston residents have been subjected to one of the largest hoon crisis in Queensland. Despite best efforts from the Queensland Police Service to battle the ongoing eradicate behavior, many hoons continuously menace the roads endangering the public.

== Demographics ==
In the 2006 census, Gilston had a population of 575 people.

In the 2011 census, Gilston had a population of 1,449, an increase of almost 900 since the previous census in 2006.

In the 2016 census, Gilston had a population of 2,459 people.

In the 2021 census, Gilston had a population of 2,669 people.

== Heritage listings ==
Gilson has a number of heritage-listed sites, including:

- H2 Hinde Tree, 926 Gilston Road, Colliston (28.0437°S 153.2877°E)

== Education ==
Gilston State School is a government primary (Prep-6) school for boys and girls at 588 Worongary Road (28.0394°S 153.3108°E). In 2017, the school had an enrolment of 599 students with 40 teachers (37 full-time equivalent) and 24 non-teaching staff (16 full-time equivalent). It includes a special education program.

There is no secondary school in Gilston. The nearest government secondary school is Nerang State High School in neighbouring Nerang to the north.

== Amenities ==
Gilston Public Hall is located at 471 Gilston Road (28.0226°S 153.3093°E) beside Gilston Hall Park. It is used by a number of community groups. The Gold Coast City Council operates a fortnightly mobile library service which visits the public hall.

== Sports ==
The Grand Golf Club has its entrance at 364 Gilston Road but most of the course is in neighbouring Advancetown, accessed by a bridge over the Nerang River (28.0160°S 153.3065°E). This private club has a 19-hole golf course designed by Greg Norman.
