= Nerang River =

Nerang
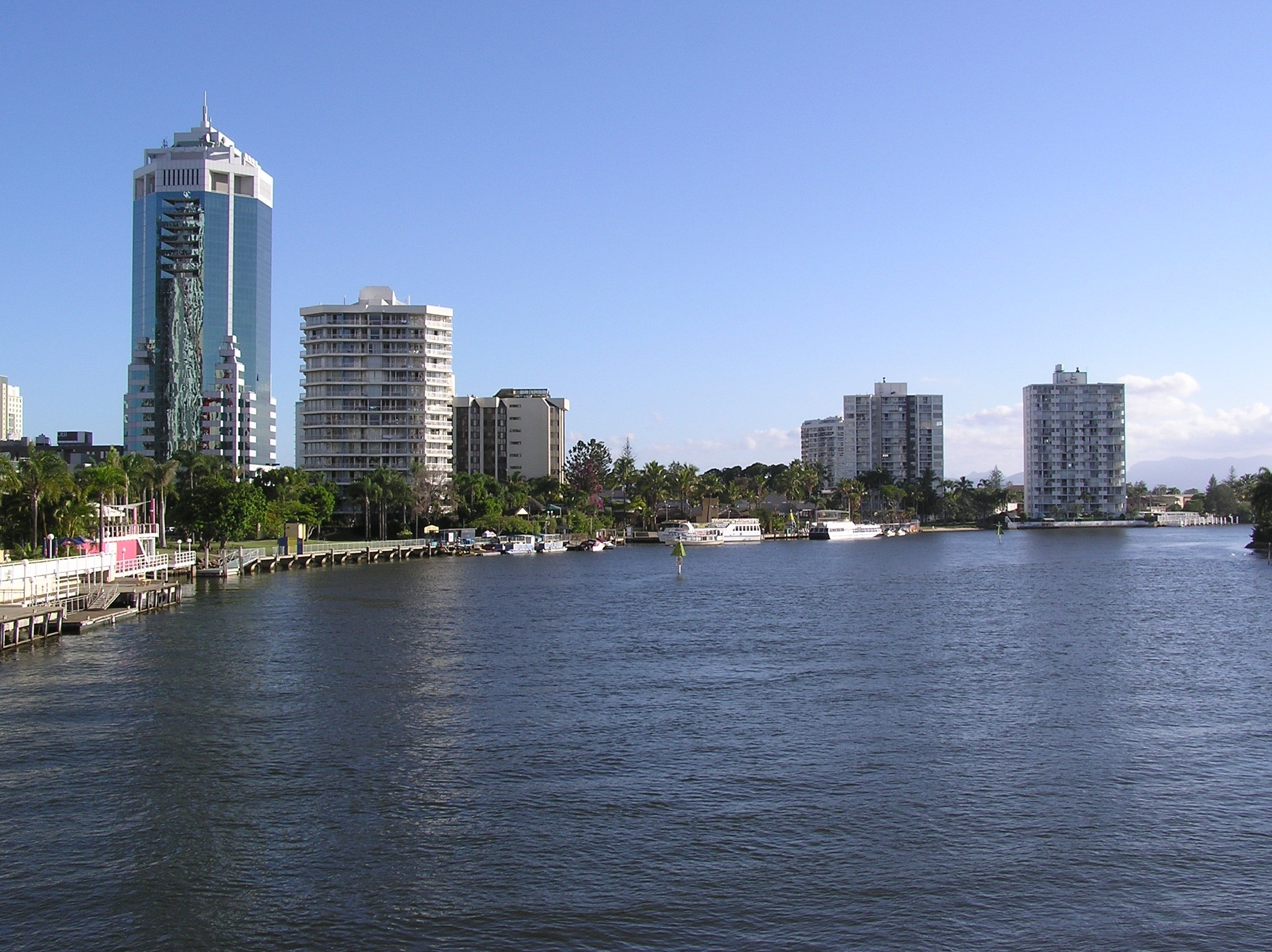
- View south at Surfers Paradise, 2007

- Location of the Nerang River mouth in Queensland
- Etymology: Yugambeh: little or shovel-nosed shark

Location
- Country: Australia
- State: Queensland
- Region: South East Queensland
- Local government area: City of Gold Coast
- City: Southport

Physical characteristics
- Source: McPherson Range
  - location: Numinbah Valley
  - coordinates: 28°14′34″S 153°15′15″E
  - elevation: 138 m (453 ft)
- Mouth: Gold Coast Broadwater
  - location: Southport
  - coordinates: 27.9756°S 153.4225°E
  - elevation: 0 m (0 ft)
- Length: 62 km (39 mi)
- Basin size: 490 km^{2} (190 sq mi)

Basin features
- Tributaries
  - left: Nixon Creek, Tonys Creek, Crane Creek (Queensland)
  - right: Nerang Creek, Bridge Creek (Queensland)
- National park: Springbrook National Park

The Nerang River is a perennial river in South East Queensland, Australia. Its catchment lies within the Gold Coast local government area and covers an area of 490 square kilometres (190 sq mi). The river is approximately 62 kilometres (39 mi) in length.

== Course and features ==
The Nerang River rises in the McPherson Range in the Numinbah Valley on the New South Wales and Queensland border and heads north, then east where it flows through Nerang and reaching its mouth in the Gold Coast Broadwater at Southport on the Gold Coast and emptying into the Coral Sea. The river descends 255 metres (837 ft) over its 62-kilometre (39 mi) course. Major crossings of the river occur at Nerang where the river is crossed by the Pacific Motorway and at Southport where the river is crossed by the Gold Coast Highway.

Upstream from Pockets Road crossing in Numinbah Valley, 2016

The Nerang River catchment is the largest and most significant river system on the Gold Coast. Its upper reaches in the McPherson Range and Springbrook Plateau deliver flows through significant rural areas and also feed into the Hinze Dam, creating Advancetown Lake, the Gold Coast's main water supply, and Little Nerang Dam. These two reservoirs provide a large percentage of potable water for the Gold Coast and are managed by Gold Coast Water. The Hinze Dam has had a significant flood mitigation effect. In the river's lower catchment, multi-branched canal developments and a number of artificial tidal and freshwater lake systems have influenced and altered large aras of the floodplain. These canal developments provide a range of opportunities for many residents including boating and recreational fishing. The canals and lakes provide habitat to a range of aquatic, terrestrial and marine flora and fauna. The canal systems provide for drainage of stormwater and contribute to flood mitigation, but can periodically be subject to contamination via stormwater drainage.

A number of islands are located in the canal region of the river's lower catchment, including the Girung, Paradise, Chevron, and McIntosh Islands. Two man-made lakes are also located in the lower catchment, including the Lake Rosser and Lake Capabella.

The river's mouth was once located much further south. In the early 1800s it entered the ocean at Broadbeach and by 1930 its mouth was located where Sea World now is. The main driving force for this movement is the northward drift of sand along the coast.

=== Crossings ===
A number of river crossings of the Nerang River are named, including the following listed below (from upstream to downstream), together with their location relative to tributaries of the river:

Crossing name	Location(s)	Coordinates	Image	Purpose	Notes
Lyons Crossing		28°11′52″S 153°13′51″E			
Staffords Road Causeway		28°09′55″S 153°13′18″E			
Nixon Creek
Tony's Creek
Unnamed	Numinbah Valley	28°09′19″S 153°13′25″E			
Priems Crossing	Numinbah Valley	28°06′30″S 153°14′39″E			
Nerang Creek
Hinze Dam	Advancetown	28°02′59″S 153°16′50″E		Pedestrian only	
Narrow Bridge	Advancetown	28°02′44″S 153°17′08″E		Road traffic below Hinze Dam wall	
Bridge Creek
Latimers Crossing		28°01′34″S 153°17′52″E			
The Grand Golf Club		28°00′52″S 153°18′29″E		Private bridge	
R. A. Stevens Bridge	McLaren Road	27°59′54″S 153°18′41″E			
Crane Creek
Weedons Crossing	Weedons Road	27°59′48″S 153°19′42″E			
Pacific Motorway interchange	Nerang Connection Road	27°59′26″S 153°20′19″E			
Pacific Motorway interchange	Pacific Motorway	27°59′14″S 153°20′28″E		Dual carriageway	
Gold Coast railway line	Nerang; Helensvale	27°59′12″S 153°20′53″E		Passenger rail	
Ross Street Bridge	Carrara; Worongary; Merrimac; Benowa; Ashmore	28°00′30″S 153°22′14″E		Dual carriageway	
Bermuda Street Bridge	Broadbeach Waters; Clear Island Waters; Bundall; Isle of Capri	28°00′59″S 153°24′40″E		Dual carriageway	
Isle of Capri Bridge	Isle of Capri; Surfers Paradise; Broadbeach	28°00′34″S 153°25′36″E		Via Roma	
Chevron Island	Ashmore; Bundall	27°59′51″S 153°24′55″E		via Thomas Drive (west)	
Chevron Island	Surfers Paradise	27°59′55″S 153°25′32″E		via Thomas Drive (east)	
Chevron Island	Cronin Island	27°59′40″S 153°25′03″E		via Southern Cross Drive	
Anabranch Bridges	McIntosh Island (south)	27°59′21″S 153°25′41″E		Gold Coast Highway	
Anabranch Bridges	McIntosh Island (north)	27°58′59″S 153°25′28″E		Gold Coast Highway	
Sundale Bridge	Southport; Main Beach	27°58′37″S 153°25′16″E		Gold Coast Highway	
Gold Coast Light Rail Bridge	Southport; Main Beach	27°58′37″S 153°25′16″E		375 metres (1,230 ft) long with 12 spans supported by 26 bored concrete piles with steel liners.	
Jubilee Bridge	Southport; Main Beach	27°58′28″S 153°25′22″E		Removed in 1966	
Gold Coast Broadwater

== Etymology ==
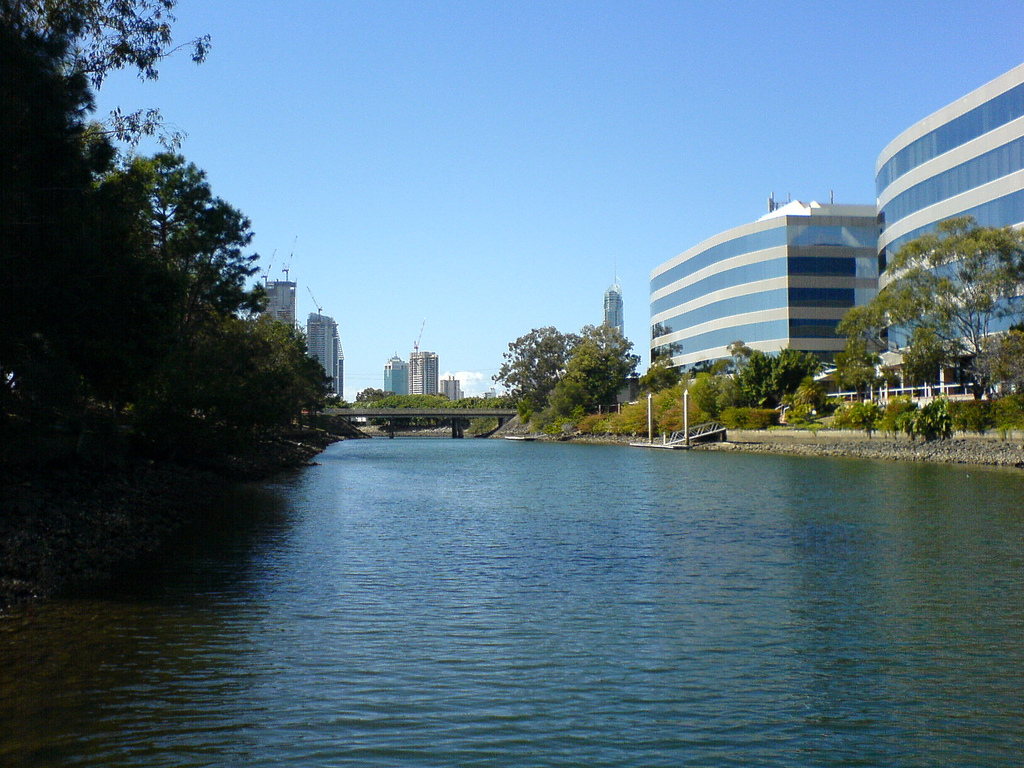
Canal at Bundall

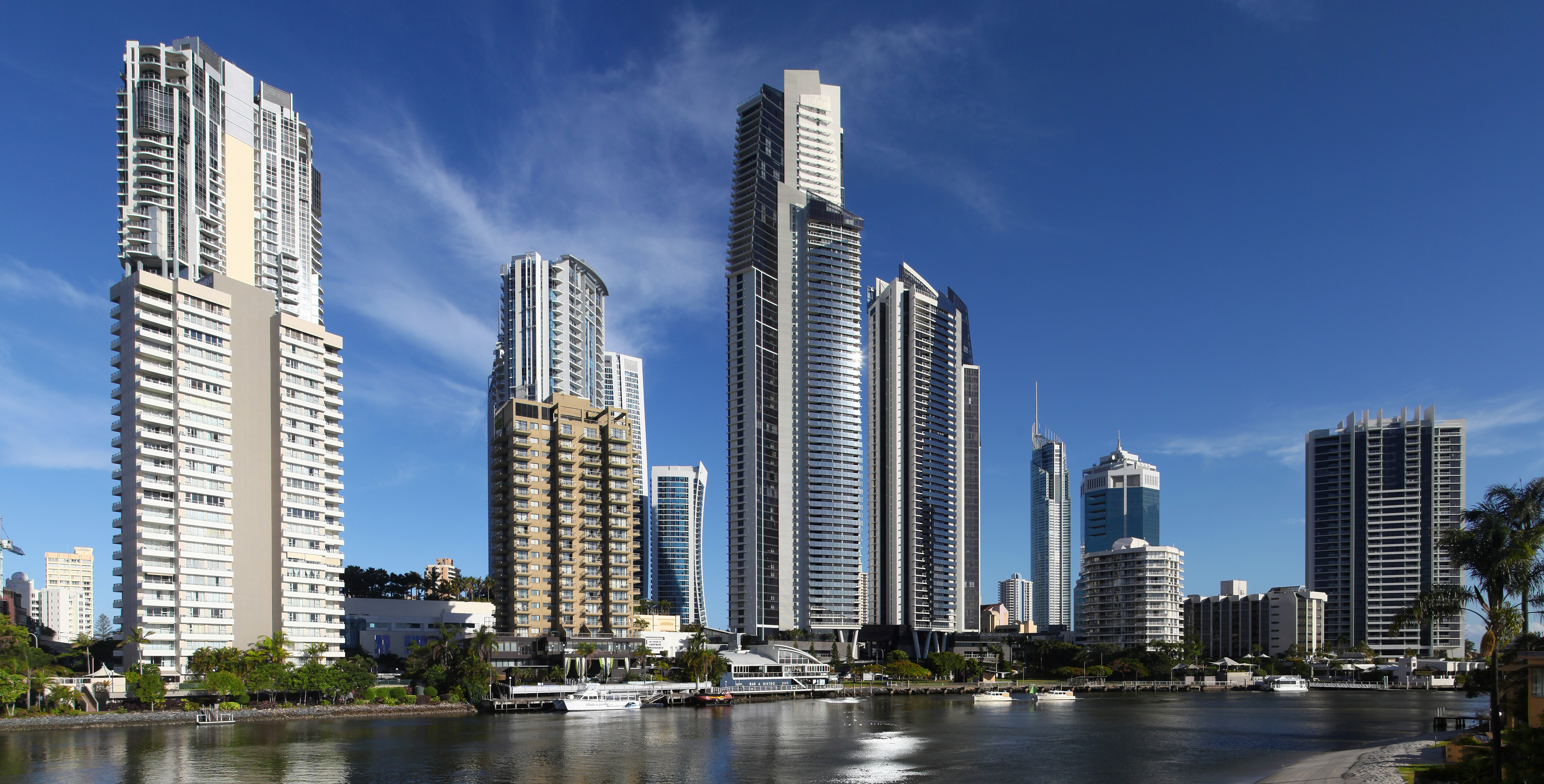
Gold coast skyline view from Nerang River, Chevron Island.

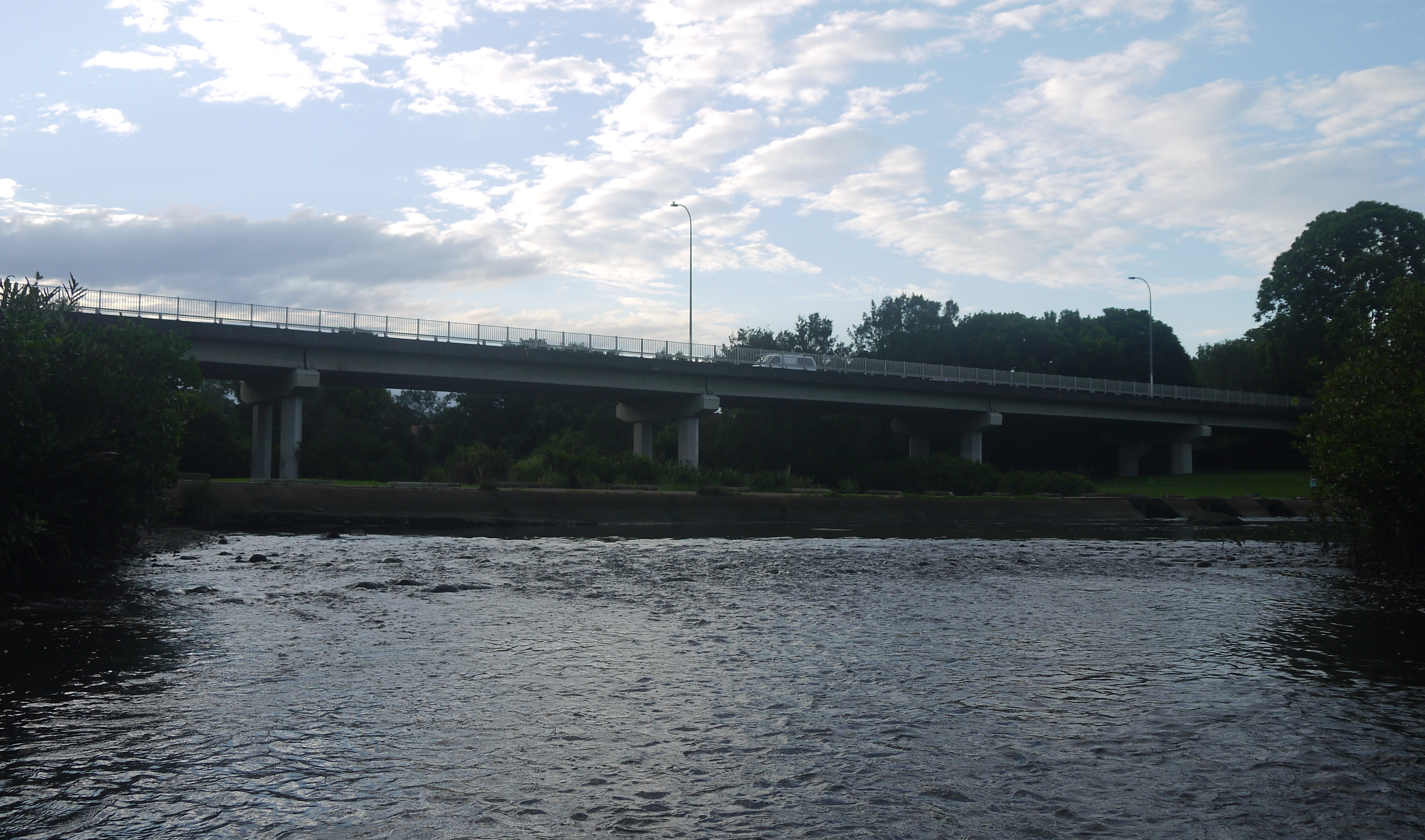
Tidal limit of Nerang River at Weedons Crossing

The river was initially named the River Barrow by government surveyor Robert Dixon when he charted the Gold Coast in 1840, after Sir John Barrow, Secretary of the Admiralty. The surveyor general Thomas Mitchell later changed many places to Aboriginal names, and this included giving the Nerang River its present name. Neerang or neerung are Yugambeh words meaning "little shark" or "shovel-nosed shark". But the local aboriginal people called the river Mogumbin or Been-goor-abee; and the peoples of the Tweed called it Talgai.

== History ==
In June 1967, the development of an east coast low lead to the rising of waters in the river that went on to flood significant lands upriver from Surfers Paradise.

== Recreation ==
=== Surfers Riverwalk ===
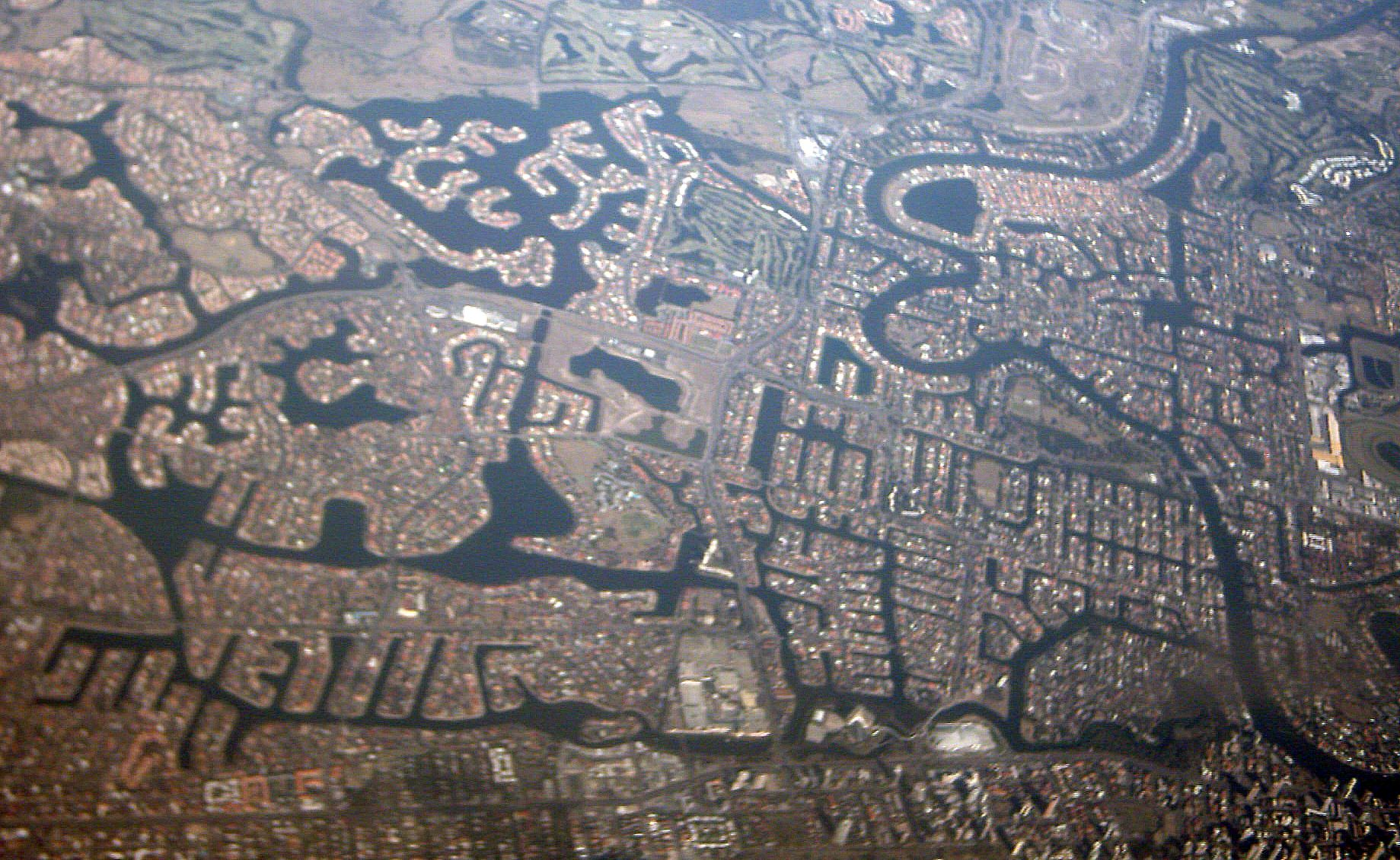
The Nerang River (right of image) and canals

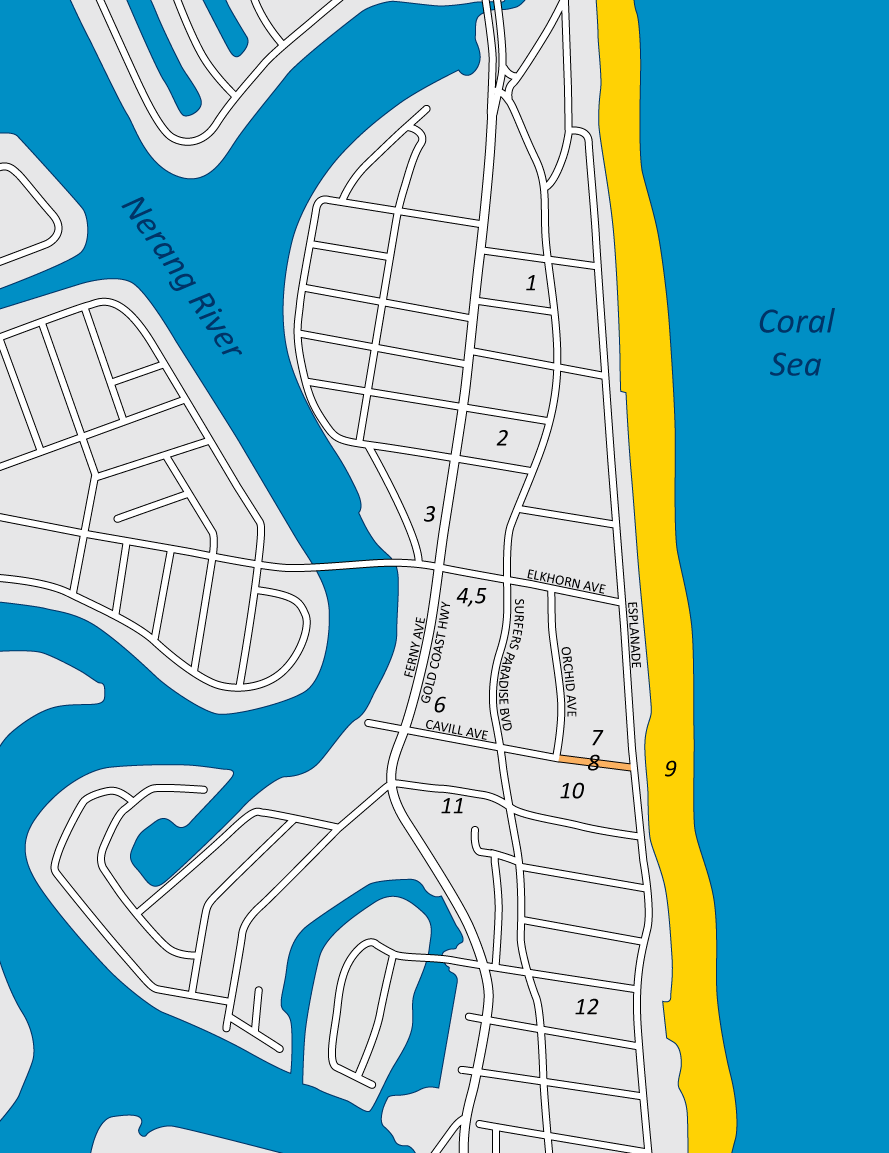
Part of the lower Nerang River

The City of Gold Coast council's "Surfers Riverwalk" coastal pathway links Sundale Bridge, Macintosh Island, Budd's Beach, Surfers Central Riverwalk, Cascade Gardens, the Gold Coast Convention & Exhibition Centre, Casino Island and Pacific Fair shopping centre.

=== Boat ramps ===
Boat ramps that are open to the public are located at Waterways Drive at Main Beach, Budds Beach, Evandale, on the Isle of Capri, TE Peters Drive at Broadbeach Waters (Convention Centre), Carrara Road, Carrara, and at the Nerang River Parklands.

== Nerang Riverkeepers Group ==
Established in 2000, under the Beaches to Bushland Volunteer restoration program, the group works to restore local endemic species along the Nerang River. A major ongoing project is control of the invasive cats claw creeper, registered as a Weed of National Significance. Cat’s claw creeper was introduced to Australia. It is native to Central and South America and the West Indies. It was first reported as naturalised in the 1950s. The seeds spread by wind or water. A woody vine, it invades warm native forests killing native trees and undergrowth. If cut down it can regrow from persistent underground tubers.

== See also ==
- List of rivers of Australia § Queensland
