= Nerang, Queensland =

Nerang
- Town
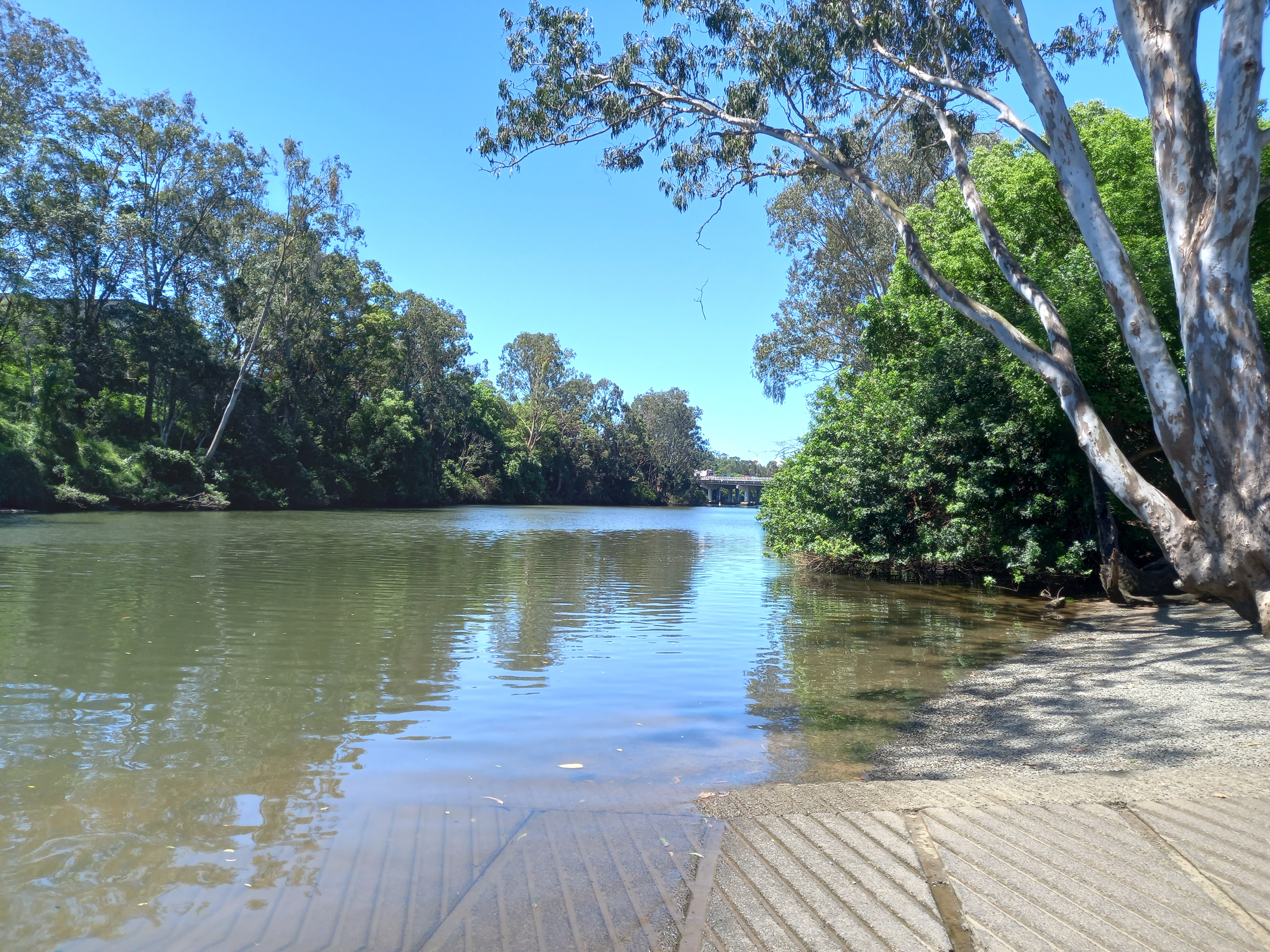
- Nerang boat ramp at Arthur Earle Park

- Interactive map of Nerang
- Coordinates: 27.9902°S 153.3358°E
- Country: Australia
- State: Queensland
- City: Gold Coast
- LGA: City of Gold Coast
- Location: 11.9 km (7.4 mi) W of Southport; 12.8 km (8.0 mi) W of Surfers Paradise; 72.8 km (45.2 mi) SSE of Brisbane; 33.2 km (20.6 mi) NW of Tweed Heads

Government
  - State electorate: Gaven
  - Federal divisions: Moncrieff; Wright

Area
  - Total: 35.9 km^{2} (13.9 sq mi)
- Elevation: 11 m (36 ft)

Population
  - Total: 17,048 (2021 census)
  - Density: 474.9/km^{2} (1,229.9/sq mi)
- Time zone: UTC+10:00 (AEST)
- Postcode: 4211
Localities around Nerang
Maudsland	Pacific Pines; Gaven	Molendinar
Mount Nathan	Nerang	Ashmore
Advancetown	Gilston; Highland Park	Carrara

Nerang is a town and suburb in the City of Gold Coast, Queensland, Australia. In the 2021 census, the suburb of Nerang had a population of 17,048 people.

== Geography ==
The Nerang River flows through the locality from south to east, passing through the town. The river ultimately flows into the most southern part of Moreton Bay.

== Economy ==
Nerang has a small town centre in which banking and a range of other commercial and retail services are available. Of more prominence within the Division, is the development of a series of light industrial parks which house a diverse range of small and large business operations providing services such as panel beating, motor vehicle wrecking, a wide range of trades, printing and equipment hire services. Administration offices of the Gold Coast City Council are also located at Nerang including Council functions such as finance, town planning and building services.

== History ==
The town takes its name from the river which, in turn, is reportedly a word from the Yugambeh language meaning small river or the Bundjalung language meaning shovel nosed shark. Before British colonisation the area was inhabited by the Kombumerri clan and the Wanggeriburra clan of the Yugambeh people. Raids by the Native Police in the 1850s extinguished most of the Aboriginal population from the area. In one operation conducted along the Nerang River in 1857 by Sub-Inspector Frederick Wheeler, an Aboriginal camp was fired upon and dispersed, with a blind man named Nyajum being executed in front of his female relatives.

The township of Nerang was surveyed by Martin Lavelle in June 1865. Lavelle named a street after himself and others after local pioneers like William White the local squatter, and Edmund Price the local planter. Nerang has focused very much on the river crossing and the head of navigation. Land was first sold here in 1871. Daily Cobb & Co coach services from Brisbane began the same year and river transport to the settlement became more regular. Benjamin Cockerill erected the first hotel, The Nerang, in early 1872. The population of the 'town' of Nerang in the 1871 census was too small even to be included in the list of towns in the region. A thrice weekly Cobb & Co coach service provided the incentive for the opening of a second hotel called the Southern Cross, followed by the Royal Mail in 1873. With an abundant supply of red cedar amongst other tree species, the first industry to flourish in the area was timber cutting.

Nerang State School opened on 1 November 1875 with 47 students under teacher Thomas Johnson.

With the establishment of a telegraph office, two stores, a butcher, a saddler, a baker and a boot maker it was clear that a township was forming. By 1881 the population reached 95.

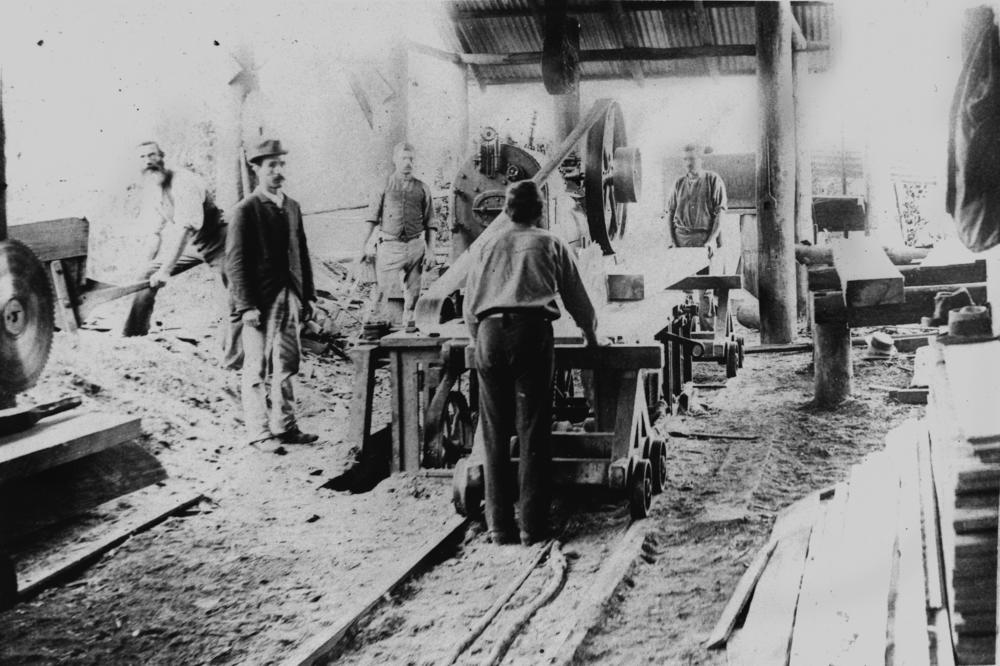
Rossler's Sawmill, 1896

On 30 September 1885 J. Howard Maynard auctioned 34 allotments on the bank of Mooyumbin Creek, bound by Martin Street, Tibbing Street and Price Street. At the time the amenities advertised included the Commercial Hotel, agricultural and saw-milling district and a railway station was promised.

By 1888 there were three schools in Nerang and the population had grown to 343 by 1901. By 1905 Nerang was becoming a centre for dairying. Maize was the main industry with arrowroot and potato crops also becoming more important.

Although the economic focus of the Gold Coast today is tourism, in the 19th century the South Coast (as it was then known) was an agricultural area. Sugar and maize were grown by farmers along the upper reaches of the Nerang River. At that time, Nerang was the one of those townships in the Gold Coast hinterland that reflected that the economic focus of the area was agriculture. The South Coast railway arrived in Nerang in 1887 with the town being serviced by the old Nerang railway station 27.9953°S 153.3401°E. The railway linked these rural towns together and gave impetus to their development. Subdivision was conventional and buildings were traditional rural or rural commercial.

In 1927, a timber building was the first built specifically for use as the Nerang Council Chambers. During World War II the Australian Army's 4th Armoured Brigade operated a tank training centre at Nerang.

The Shire of Nerang became part of the Shire of Albert in 1950 and the Nerang Council Chambers became a post office.

It was not until the mid 20th century that the beaches of the South Coast attracted significant interest as a holiday destination, which led to the coining of the name Gold Coast where tourism became the dominant sector of the economy.

The Gaven Way, a highway connecting the Pacific Highway to Nerang, opened to traffic on 10 December 1960. It was the first stage of the Pacific Motorway in Queensland and the first initiative to diverting the major highway traffic travelling between Queensland and New South Wales to bypass the coastal recreational areas of the Gold Coast.

The South Coast railway and the Nerang railway station closed in 1964, partly reflecting the rising use of automobiles and partly reflecting the declining importance of agriculture. The Pacific Motorway development through the Gold Coast hinterland mostly followed the route of the reserved land corridor of the South Coast railway. The highway shifted development in the town in a manner which extended and perhaps dominated the early township. Nonetheless the early township still retains its connection to the river and its early subdivisions and commercial centre survives. The Nerang town centre was bypassed by the Pacific Motorway in 1979.

Nerang State High School opened on 28 January 1986.

St Brigid's Catholic Primary School opened in 1994.

In the 1990s, it was realised that the Gold Coast needed a railway leading to the construction of the Gold Coast railway line which reached Nerang in 1997, although the new railway line had to follow a different route and the new Nerang railway station was in a different location to the former station on the South Coast line. This railway line was not to service agriculture but for workers and tourists to commute between the Gold Coast and Brisbane (including connection to Brisbane Airport for business and leisure travelers).

Like other Gold Coast hinterland towns, Nerang began to change from being a service centre for agriculture to becoming increasingly residential suburbs for workers in the coastal tourism industries. This was officially recognised in 2003 when Nerang was re-designated a suburb rather than a locality. Recent years have seen the early Nerang flourish as an administrative centre for the growing Gold Coast.

The Nerang public library was opened in 2003.

== Demographics ==
In the 2011 census, the suburb of Nerang had a population of 16,256 people.

In the 2016 census, the suburb of Nerang had a population of 16,864 people.

In the 2021 census, the suburb of Nerang had a population of 17,048 people.

== Transport ==
Nerang is a regional and transportation hub, containing several shopping centres and Nerang railway station.

== Education ==
Nerang State School is a government primary (Prep–6) school for boys and girls at 3 Nerang Street (27.9886°S 153.3384°E). In 2018, the school had an enrolment of 325 students with 28 teachers (23 full-time equivalent) and 21 non-teaching staff (12 full-time equivalent). It includes a special education program.

St Brigid's Catholic Primary School is a Catholic primary (Prep–6) school for boys and girls at 39–49 McLaren Road (28.0008°S 153.3183°E). In 2018, the school had an enrolment of 406 students with 31 teachers (25 full-time equivalent) and 17 non-teaching staff (10 full-time equivalent).

Nerang State High School is a government secondary (7–12) school for boys and girls at Weedons Road (28.0005°S 153.3278°E). In 2018, the school had an enrolment of 1026 students with 93 teachers (88 full-time equivalent) and 43 non-teaching staff (31 full-time equivalent). It includes a special education program.

== Community amenities ==
The Nerang Branch Library is located on the corner of White & Price Streets. The Nerang Branch Library also holds the Special Needs Library Collection which contains specialist materials for developmental and disability needs.

The Nerang branch of the Queensland Country Women's Association meets at the Girl Guide Hut at 40 Ferry Street.

== Sport and recreation ==
A number of well-known sporting teams represent the local area, including the Nerang Roosters is the local rugby league club and Nerang Bulls RUC are the local Rugby Union club who play home games at Robert Dalley Park. The Carrara Sports Ground is located a short distance away from the Nerang Train Station with Metricon Stadium being the home for of the Gold Coast Suns AFL football team. The area surrounding the Carrara Sports Ground has undertaken significant development in anticipation for the 2018 Commonwealth Games.

Nerang also boasts a velodrome and a public swimming pool complex that has 3 pools and a junior splash area owned and operated by the Gold Coast City Council. The Mudgeeraba/Nerang Cricket Club also has its home ground at Carrara with turf wicket, practice nets and club house facilities. It has teams in all grades from juniors through to first grade in the Gold Coast District Cricket competition. There are also a number of world class golf courses within easy reach from Nerang. The Nerang Division takes in areas such as Springbrook, Natural Arch, the Rock Pools and Lower Beechmont; all great places to take the family for picnics, horse riding and bush walking.

== Heritage listings ==
There are a number of heritage-listed sites, including:

- 68 Billabirra Crescent (Country Paradise Parklands): Nerang Police Lock-up (Old Nerang Gaol)
- 48 Nerang Street (Bischof Pioneer Park, 27.9903°S 153.3378°E): Maid of Sker
- 48 Nerang Street (Bischof Pioneer Park, 27.9914°S 153.3372°E): Ceramic House
- 48 Nerang Street (Bischof Pioneer Park, 27.9918°S 153.3369°E): Preece House
- 34 Price Street: Nerang Hall (formerly Nerang School of Arts)

Relocated from Nerang:

- 135 Bundall Road, Surfers Paradise (Surfers Paradise Administration Centre): St Margaret's Church (originally in Nerang)

== Notable residents ==
- Sara Carrigan - Athens 2004 Olympic gold medalist in road bicycle racing
- Billy Drumley, Indigenous community leader
- Sydney Barber Josiah Skertchly (1850 – 1926), botanist and geologist, buried in the cemetery.
- Reece Walsh - current Brisbane Broncos and Queensland State of Origin representative, brought up in the suburb and grew up playing junior rugby league for the Nerang Roosters.
