= List of schools in Gold Coast, Queensland =

This is a list of schools in the City of Gold Coast in Queensland, Australia. Prior to 2015, the Queensland education system consisted of primary schools, which accommodated students from Kindergarten to Year 7 (ages 5–13), and high schools, which accommodate students from Years 8 to 12 (ages 12–18). However, from 2015, Year 7 became the first year of high school.

== Government schools ==
=== Government primary schools ===
The following are the government primary schools, catering for Prep to Year 6, in the Gold Coast area:

Government primary schools on the Gold Coast
Name	Suburb	Years	Opened	Coordinates	Ref
Arundel State School	Arundel	P-6	1994	27°56′40″S 153°21′56″E	
Ashmore State School	Ashmore	P-6	1978	27°59′19″S 153°22′52″E	
Bellevue Park State School	Ashmore	P-6	1983	27°59′41″S 153°23′49″E	
Benowa State School	Benowa	P-6	1885	28°0′25″S 153°23′30″E	
Biggera Waters State School	Biggera Waters	P-6	1970	27°55′38″S 153°23′47″E	
Broadbeach State School	Broadbeach	P-6	1960	28°2′8″S 153°26′4″E	
Burleigh Heads State School	Burleigh Heads	P-6	1917	28°5′12″S 153°26′56″E	
Caningeraba State School	Burleigh Waters	P-6	1987	28°5′6″S 153°25′49″E	
Cedar Creek State School	Cedar Creek	P-6	1874	27°49′39″S 153°10′38″E	
Clover Hill State School	Mudgeeraba	P-6	2004	28°5′31″S 153°22′35″E	
Coolangatta State School	Coolangatta	P-6	1919	28°10′18″S 153°31′44″E	
Coombabah State School	Coombabah	P-6	1981	27°53′39″S 153°23′18″E	
Coomera State School	Coomera	P-6	1873	27°53′39″S 153°23′18″E	
Coomera Rivers State School	Coomera	P-6	2011	27°50′43.81″S 153°19′38.26″E	
Coomera Springs State School	Upper Coomera	P-6	2008	27°50′49.31″S 153°18′1.98″E	
Currumbin State School	Currumbin	P-6	1909	28°8′20.29″S 153°28′40.36″E	
Currumbin Valley State School	Currumbin Valley	P-6	1908	28°12′23.69″S 153°23′39.64″E	
Elanora State School	Elanora	P-6	1983	28°7′47.3″S 153°27′58.57″E	
Gaven State School	Oxenford	P-6	1995	27°55′11.54″S 153°18′19.07″E	
Gilston State School	Gilston	P-6	1881	28°2′22.01″S 153°18′45.05″E	
Helensvale State School	Helensvale	P-6	1984	27°54′56.86″S 153°19′40.86″E	
Highland Reserve State School	Upper Coomera	P-6	2009	27°53′30.02″S 153°16′57.15″E	
Ingleside State School	Tallebudgera Valley	P-6	1892	28°10′0.87″S 153°22′52.13″E	
Labrador State School	Labrador	P-6	1921	27°56′32.57″S 153°24′6.37″E	
Merrimac State School	Merrimac	P-6	1917	28°2′27.49″S 153°22′36.13″E	
Miami State School	Mermaid Waters	P-6	1979	28°3′36.4″S 153°25′34.38″E	
Mudgeeraba State School	Mudgeeraba	P-6	1892	28°4′28.25″S 153°21′10.72″E	
Mudgeeraba Creek State School	Mudgeeraba	P-6	1996	28°5′12.86″S 153°20′51.44″E	
Musgrave Hill State School	Southport	P-6	1963	27°57′36.26″S 153°23′40.2″E	
Nerang State School	Nerang	P-6	1875	27°59′19.02″S 153°20′16.65″E	
Norfolk Village State School	Ormeau	P-6	2009	27°46′20.78″S 153°14′40.79″E	
Numinbah Valley State School	Numinbah Valley	P-6	1927	27°46′20.78″S 153°14′40.75″E	
Ormeau State School	Pimpama	P-6	1878	27°48′0.59″S 153°16′38.51″E	
Oxenford State School	Oxenford	P-6	1987	27°48′0.62″S 153°16′38.51″E	
Pacific Pines State School	Pacific Pines	P-6	2002	27°56′22″S 153°19′12.71″E	
Palm Beach State School	Palm Beach	P-6	1974	27°56′22.08″S 153°19′12.71″E	
Park Lake State School	Pacific Pines	P-6	2008	27°56′22.08″S 153°19′12.71″E	
Picnic Creek State School	Coomera	P-6	2018	27°50′21.23″S 153°20′19.98″E	
Pimpama State School	Pimpama	P-6	1872	27°49′0.62″S 153°16′38.85″E	
Robina State School	Robina|	P-6	1990	28°4′16.64″S 153°23′59.21″E	
Southport State School	Southport	P-6	1880	27°58′14.15″S 153°24′2.18″E	
Springbrook State School	Springbrook	P-6	1984	28°11′24.69″S 153°15′54.37″E	
Surfers Paradise State School	Surfers Paradise	P-6	1934	28°0′44.2″S 153°25′14.93″E	
Tallebudgera State School	Tallebudgera	P-6	1877	28°8′23.84″S 153°25′47.58″E	
William Duncan State School	Highland Park	P-6	1987	28°0′52.03″S 153°20′2.96″E	
Woongoolba State School	Woongoolba	P-6	1876	27°44′40.4″S 153°19′9.18″E	
Worongary State School	Worongary	P-6	1993	28°1′20.97″S 153°20′33.14″E	

=== Government secondary schools ===
The following are the government secondary schools and Colleges in the Gold Coast area, largely catering for Year 7 to Year 12:

Government high schools and colleges on the Gold Coast
Name	Suburb	Years	Opened	Coordinates	Ref
Benowa State High School	Benowa	7-12	1980	28°0′17.32″S 153°23′15.78″E	
Coombabah State High School	Coombabah	7-12	1986	27°55′28.03″S 153°22′40.85″E	
Elanora State High School	Elanora	7-12	1990	28°7′47.05″S 153°26′55.87″E	
Foxwell State Secondary College	Coomera	7-12	2020	28°7′31.77″S 153°26′49.76″E	
Helensvale State High School	Helensvale	7-12	1990	27°53′51.29″S 153°19′37.58″E	
Keebra Park State High School	Southport	7-12	1973	27°59′5.22″S 153°23′58.55″E	
Merrimac State High School	Mermaid Waters	7-12	1979	28°2′24.65″S 153°25′3.31″E	
Miami State High School	Miami	7-12	1963	28°3′46.59″S 153°26′17.11″E	
Nerang State High School	Nerang	7-12	1986	28°0′6.63″S 153°19′43.79″E	
Ormeau Woods State High School	Ormeau	7-12	2009	27°46′15.83″S 153°15′50.54″E	
Pacific Pines State High School	Pacific Pines	7-12	2000	27°56′32.69″S 153°19′10.13″E	
Palm Beach Currumbin State High School	Palm Beach	7-12	1972	28°7′54.11″S 153°28′27.43″E	
Queensland Academy for Health Sciences	Southport	7-12	2008	27°58′0.79″S 153°22′55.82″E	
Robina State High School	Robina	7-12	1996	28°4′27.71″S 153°22′35.68″E	
Southport State High School	Southport	7-12	1955	27°57′43.51″S 153°24′7.49″E	
Upper Coomera State College	Upper Coomera	P-12	2003	27°52′14.48″S 153°17′46.87″E	
Varsity College	Varsity Lakes	P-12	2001	28°4′44.54″S 153°24′41.93″E	

=== Special purpose state schools ===
The following is a list of schools for specific purposes, including schools for children with disabilities:

Special purpose state schools on the Gold Coast
Name	Suburb	Years	Opened	Coordinates	Ref
Coomera Special School	Coomera	P-12	2020	27°50′54.6″S 153°20′29.76″E	
Currumbin Community Special School	Currumbin Waters	P-12	1979	28°9′9.67″S 153°28′20.4″E	
Mudgeeraba Special School	Mudgeeraba	P-12	1981	28°4′42.29″S 153°21′48.56″E	
Southport Special School	Southport	P-12	1970	27°57′39.64″S 153°23′41.42″E	

=== Defunct Government Schools ===
The following are schools that have ceased to function in the Gold Coast area:

Defunct state schools on the Gold Coast
Name	Suburb	Years	Opened	Closed	Approximate Coordinates	Ref
Advancetown State School	Advancetown	P-6	1909	1960		
Alberton State School	Alberton	P-6	1876	1966	34°51′45.85″S 138°30′41.77″E	
Beechmont Lower State School	Lower Beechmont	P-6	1922	1967	28°7′28.06″S 153°11′9.54″E	
Bonogin State School	Bonogin	P-6	1913	1924	28°8′34.48″S 153°20′2.87″E	
Burleigh Heads State Infants School	Burleigh Heads	P-3	1978	1989		
Carrara State School	Carrara	P-6	1902	circa 1927	28°1′1.92″S 153°23′2.4″E	
Coomera Upper State School	Upper Coomera	P-6	1876	1964		
Currumbin Creek State School	Currumbin Creek	P-6	1892	1905		
Guanaba State School	Guanaba	P-6	1930	1942		
Jacobs Well State School	Norwell	P-6	1920	1974	27°46′56.64″S 153°20′5.64″E	
Keebra Park Special School	Southport	P-6	1983	1991		
Maudsland State School	Maudsland	P-12	1879	1963	27°56′44.16″S 153°16′12.36″E	
Natural Bridge State School	Natural Bridge	P-6	1939	1991	28°13′13.64″S 153°14′6.4″E	
Norwell State School	Norwell	P-6	1910	1971	27°46′31.08″S 153°18′35.64″E	
Reedy Creek State School	Norwell	P-6	1911	1963		
Ridgetop State School	Currumbin Valley	P-6	1928	1967		
Stapylton State School	Stapylton	P-6	1920	1962		
Tallebudgera Upper State School	Tallebudgera Valley	P-6	1923	circa 1942	28°12′20.34″S 153°20′2″E	

== Private schools ==
=== Catholic schools ===
In Queensland, Catholic primary schools are usually (but not always) linked to a parish. Prior to the 1970s, most schools were founded by religious institutes, but with the decrease in membership of these institutes, together with major reforms inside the church, lay teachers and administrators began to take over the schools, a process which completed by approximately 1990. Brisbane Catholic Education (BCE), headquartered in Dutton Park, was established in 1993 and is responsible for coordinating administration, curriculum and policy across the Catholic school system. Preference for enrolment is given to Catholic students from the parish or local area, although non-Catholic students are admitted if room is available.

Catholic schools on the Gold Coast
Name	Suburb	Gender	Years	Opened	Coordinates	Ref
Aquinas College	Ashmore	Co-ed	7–12	1964	27°58′33.05″S 153°22′57.73″E	
Assisi Catholic College	Upper Coomera	Co-ed	P–12	2005	27°51′34.58″S 153°18′4.39″E	
Guardian Angels Primary School	Wynnum	Co-ed	P–6	1904	27°26′45.96″S 153°10′32.58″E	
Jubilee Primary School	Pacific Pines	Co-ed	P–6	2001	27°55′33.86″S 153°19′0.67″E	
Marymount College	Burleigh Waters	Co-ed	7–12	1967	28°6′5.4″S 153°25′49.44″E	
Marymount Primary School	Burleigh Waters	Co-ed	P–6	1949	28°6′3.6″S 153°25′45.84″E	
Mother Teresa Primary School	Ormeau	Co-ed	P–6	2010	27°46′56.25″S 153°16′21.8″E	
St Augustine's Catholic Primary School	Currumbin Waters	Co-ed	P–6	1987	28°9′3″S 153°27′35.59″E	
St Brigid's Catholic Primary School	Nerang	Co-ed	P–6	1994	28°0′2.18″S 153°19′7.04″E	
St Francis Xavier's Catholic Primary School	Runaway Bay	Co-ed	P–6	1975	33°53′49.49″S 151°6′51.03″E	
St Joseph's College	Coomera	Co-ed	P–12	2019	27°49′56.15″N 153°20′3.26″E	
St Kevin's Catholic Primary School	Benowa	Co-ed	P–6	1979	28°0′17.3″S 153°23′28.93″E	
St Michael's College	Merrimac	Co-ed	7–12	1985	28°2′36.73″S 153°21′52.84″E	
St Vincent's Primary School	Clear Island Waters	Co-ed	P–6	1948	28°2′8.78″S 153°24′11.24″E	
Star of the Sea School	Merrimac	Co-ed	P–6	2022	28°2′58.2″S 153°22′3.72″E	

=== Independent schools ===
Independent schools on the Gold Coast
Name	Suburb	Category	Gender	Years	Opened	Coordinates	Ref
A.B. Paterson College	Arundel	Non-denominational	Co-ed	P–12	1991	27°55′38.68″S 153°21′31.87″E	
All Saints Anglican School	Merrimac	Anglican	Co-ed	P–12	1987	28°3′40.24″N 153°21′39.59″E	
Arcadia College	Robina	Independent	Co-ed	7–12		28°4′7.04″S 153°22′41.42″E	
Australian International Islamic College - Gold Coast Campus	Carrara	Islamic	Co-ed	P–12	2009		
Coomera Anglican College	Upper Coomera	Anglican	Co-ed	P–12	1997	27°51′31.78″S 153°18′20.7″E	
Emmanuel College	Carrara	Christian	Co-ed	P–12	1985	27°30′7.98″S 153°0′33.93″E	
Gold Coast Christian College	Reedy Creek	Adventist	Co-ed	P–12	1982	28°6′14.78″S 153°23′58.85″E	
Guardian Angels' Catholic Primary School	Ashmore	Catholic	Co-ed	P–6	1901	27°26′45.96″S 153°10′32.58″E	
Hillcrest Christian College	Reedy Creek	Christian	Co-ed	P–12	1982	28°6′11.54″S 153°23′51.46″E	
Josiah College	Carrara	Christian	Co-ed	P–12	2018	28°0′50.11″S 153°22′17.06″E	
King's Christian College - Reedy Creek Campus	Reedy Creek	Christian	Co-ed	P–12	1980	28°5′55.74″S 153°23′34.34″E	
King's Christian College - Pimpama Campus	Pimpama	Christian	Co-ed	P–12		27°48′36.16″S 153°17′46.4″E	
King's Christian College - Logan Village Campus	Logan Village	Christian	Co-ed	P–12		27°46′6.03″S 153°5′59.26″E	
Livingstone Christian College	Ormeau	Christian	Co-ed	P–12	2002	27°47′35.48″S 153°16′2.11″E	
Lutheran Ormeau Rivers District School (LORDS)	Pimpama	Lutheran	Co-ed	P–12	2012	27°47′56.99″S 153°17′7.49″E	
Mastery Schools Australia - Coolangatta Campus	Coolangatta	Independent	Co-ed	4–10	2021	28°10′3.77″S 153°32′18.65″E	
Mastery Schools Australia - Southport Campus	Southport	Independent	Co-ed	4–10	2021	27°57′57.7″S 153°24′50″E	
Mastery Schools Australia - Varsity Lakes Campus	Varsity Lakes	Independent	Co-ed	4–10	2021	28°4′38.11″S 153°24′51.41″E	
Men of Business Academy	Southport	Independent	Male	11–12		27°57′59.77″S 153°24′55.92″E	
Rivermount College	Yatala	Christian	Co-ed	P–12	1992	27°45′13.93″S 153°12′1.09″E	
Silkwood School	Mount Nathan	Non-denominational	Co-ed	P–12	1983	28°0′7.25″S 153°17′20.54″E	
Somerset College	Mudgeeraba	Christian	Co-ed	P–12	1983	28°5′28.33″S 153°22′29.51″E	
Sophia Waldorf School	Mudgeeraba	Steiner	Co-ed	P–6	2019	33°47′50.41″S 151°10′42.12″E	
Southport Flexible Learning Centre	Southport	Catholic alternative	Co-ed	7–12	2007	27°57′33.22″S 153°23′32.69″E	
St Andrews Lutheran College	Tallebudgera	Lutheran	Co-ed	P–12	1993	28°7′20.69″S 153°25′55.88″E	
St Hilda's School	Southport	Anglican	Female	P–12	1912	27°58′8.86″S 153°24′26.54″E	
Saint Stephen's College	Upper Coomera	Anglican Catholic	Co-ed	P–12	1996	27°52′13.63″S 153°18′29.37″E	
Tamborine Mountain College	North Tamborine	No religious affiliation	Co-ed	P–12	1995	27°55′39.51″S 153°10′34.56″E	
The BUSY School - Southport Girls+ Campus	Southport	Alternative	Co-ed	11–12	2020	27°58′16.71″S 153°24′23.91″E	
The BUSY School - Coolangatta Campus	Coolangatta	Alternative	Co-ed	11–12	2020	28°10′13.43″S 153°32′23.2″E	
The Industry School - Gold Coast Campus	Robina	No religious affiliation	Co-ed	10–12	2022	27°27′43.37″S 153°1′25.01″E	
The Southport School	Southport	Anglican	Male	P–12	1901	27°59′7.62″S 153°24′50.76″E	
The Village School Gold Coast	Coolangatta	No religious affiliation	Co-ed	P–6		28°10′2.72″S 153°32′15.69″E	
Toogoolawa School	Ormeau	Alternative	Male	3–10	2001	27°47′51.47″S 153°15′45.55″E	
Trinity Lutheran College	Ashmore	Lutheran	Co-ed	P–12	1987	27°42′41.95″S 153°11′47.04″E	

=== Defunct private schools ===
Defunct private schools on the Gold Coast
Name	Suburb	Category	Years	Opened	Closed	Approximate Coordinates	Ref
Infant Saviour School	Burleigh Waters	Catholic	Primary	1936	1948		
King Solomon College	Merrimac	Jewish	P–12	1996	2008		
Queensland Independent College	Merrimac	Montessori	P–2	2008			
St Augustine's School	Coolangatta	Catholic	Primary	1926	1986		
Star of the Sea College	Southport	Catholic (Sisters of Mercy)	Secondary	1934	1990		
Trinity Lutheran Primary School	Southport	Lutheran	Primary	1981	2001		

== See also ==
LISTS

- Lists of schools in Queensland
- List of schools in Central Queensland
- List of schools in Darling Downs
- List of schools in Far North Queensland
- List of schools in Greater Brisbane
- List of schools in North Queensland
- List of schools in Sunshine Coast, Queensland
- List of schools in West Moreton
- List of schools in Wide Bay–Burnett
- Lists of schools in Australia

GENERAL

- Education in Queensland
- Queensland state schools
- History of state education in Queensland
