= Carrara, Queensland =

Carrara
- Suburb
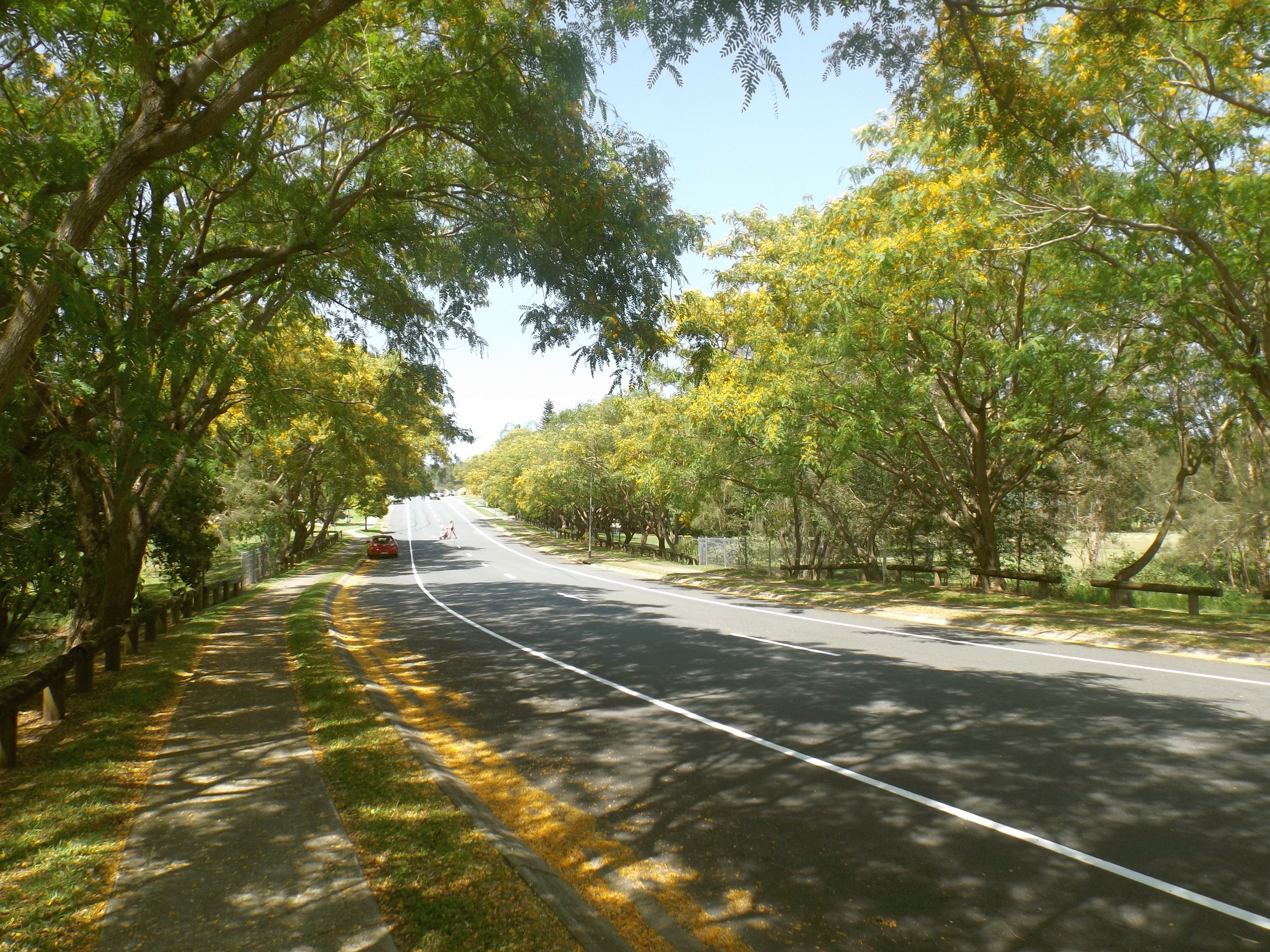
- Hickey Way, 2015

- Interactive map of Carrara
- Coordinates: 28.0208°S 153.3694°E
- Country: Australia
- State: Queensland
- City: Gold Coast
- LGA: Gold Coast City
- Location: 8.8 km (5.5 mi) WSW of Surfers Paradise; 9.5 km (5.9 mi) SW of Southport; 74.4 km (46.2 mi) SSE of Brisbane; 31.8 km (19.8 mi) NW of Tweed Heads

Government
  - State electorate: Gaven
  - Federal division: Moncrieff

Area
  - Total: 13.9 km^{2} (5.4 sq mi)
- Elevation: 1 m (3.3 ft)

Population
  - Total: 13,138 (2021 census)
  - Density: 945/km^{2} (2,448/sq mi)
- Time zone: UTC+10:00 (AEST)
- Postcode: 4211
Suburbs around Carrara
Highland Park	Nerang	Ashmore
Worongary	Carrara	Benowa
Worongary	Merrimac	Broadbeach Waters; Clear Island Waters

Carrara (/kərærə/) is a suburb in the City of Gold Coast, Queensland, Australia. In the 2021 census, Carrara had a population of 13,138 people.

== Geography ==
Carrara is bounded to the east by the southern bank of the Nerang River and to the west mostly by the Pacific Motorway.

Carrara is built on the Guragunbah Plain (28.0367°S 153.3721°E) which was officially named in 2000, having previously been unofficially known as the Merrimac-Carrara Flood Plain.

It is the home of Carrara Stadium (also known as People First Stadium for sponsorship reasons), the purpose-built cricket and Australian rules football ground where the Gold Coast Suns began playing matches in 2011.

== History ==
The name Carrara comes from the Aboriginal word Karara meaning long flat.

Carrara was first used by the Manchester Cotton Company as a cotton plantation that began in the early 1860s.

Carrara Provisional School opened in February 1902 on premises lent by farmer Francis Parr until a permanent building could be constructed on land donated by farmer William Lees. Tenders were called for the building in October 1902 with the tender being awarded in February 1903 to carpenters John Lather & Sons of Southport. On 1 January 1909 it became Carrara State School. It closed circa 1925. In 1929, the school building was relocated to Guanaba. In 1932, due to the growing population in the area, there was unsuccessful local lobbying to re-open the school by constructing a new building to operate as a provisional school on the existing site. The approximate location of the school was near the intersection of Nerang Broadbeach Road and Carrara Road (28.0172°S 153.3840°E) near to the ferry which crossed the Nerang River.

In 1958, Keith Williams established the Surfers Paradise Ski Gardens on the south bank of the Nerang River in Carrara. It quickly became a popular tourist attraction featuring shows of water skiing and speed boat driving. It also hosted Australian Water Ski championships. In 1971 the attraction relocated to a larger site on the Southport Spit as renamed Ski Land, and then was renamed Sea World in 1972 with the addition of dolphin shows and other attractions. The ski shows continued at Sea World until July 2009 with an estimated 30,000 performances over 40 years.

Pleasure Island was an amusement park that opened in 1959 and closed in 1962. It was located to the east of the Surfers Paradise Ski Gardens.

In 1966, Keith Williams developed the Surfers Paradise International Raceway (28.0164°S 153.3761°E) opposite the ski gardens. It had a 2-mile (3.2 km) road racing circuit and a 1/4 mile (0.40 km) straight dragstrip. It closed in August 1987 and was demolished in 2003 to create the Emerald Lakes canal development.

In 1968, Neville Parker purchased land on the river adjacent to the Surfers Paradise Ski Gardens where he developed the Carrara Water Ski School, teaching people how to water ski.

Emmanuel College opened on 24 January 1983.

St Michael's College opened its Carrara campus on 4 February 1985, but, as at 2021, this school is within the boundaries of neighbouring Merrimac.

In 1987, Japanese Daikyo Group worked on the $50 million Palm Meadows 18-hole golf course and country club.

In 2009, the Australian International Islamic College opened its Gold Coast campus at Carrara.

Josiah College opened in April 2018 to provide specialist education for children with autism spectrum disorders.

== Demographics ==
In the 2011 census, Carrara recorded a population of 11,569 people, 51.2% female and 48.8% male. The median age of the Carrara population was 38 years, 1 year above the national median of 37. 66% of people living in Carrara were born in Australia. The other top responses for country of birth were New Zealand 9.5%, England 5.1%, South Africa 1.3%, Japan 0.9%, Scotland 0.8%. 85% of people spoke only English at home; the next most common languages were 1.3% Japanese, 0.8% Mandarin, 0.6% German, 0.5% French, 0.5% Italian.

In the 2016 census, Carrara had a population of 12,060 people.

In the 2021 census, Carrara had a population of 13,138 people.

== Education ==
Emmanuel College is a private primary and secondary (Prep–12) school for boys and girls at Birmingham Road (28.0165°S 153.3695°E). In 2018, the school had an enrolment of 1,580 students with 128 teachers (112 full-time equivalent) and 94 non-teaching staff (65 full-time equivalent). The school describes itself as "unapologetically Christian", but is not affiliated with any specific denomination or church.

Josiah College is a private special primary and secondary (2–12) school for boys and girls on the autism spectrum. It is at 1 Emerald Lakes Drive (28.0139°S 153.3714°E). It is operated by Emmanuel College.

The Australian International Islamic College has a private primary and secondary (Prep–12) campus at 19 Chisholm Road (28.0033°S 153.3567°E). The school has its main campus at Durack in Brisbane.

There are no government schools in Carrara. The nearest government primary schools are Nerang State School in neighbouring Nerang to the north, Ashmore State School in neighbouring Ashmore to the northeast, Merrimac State School in neighbouring Merrimac to the south, Worongary State School in neighbouring Worongary to the west, and William Duncan State School in neighbouring Highland Park to the northwest. The nearest government secondary schools are Nerang State High School in neighbouring Nerang to the north, Benowa State High School in neighbouring Benowa to the east, and Merrimac State High School in neighbouring Merrimac to the south.

== Facilities ==
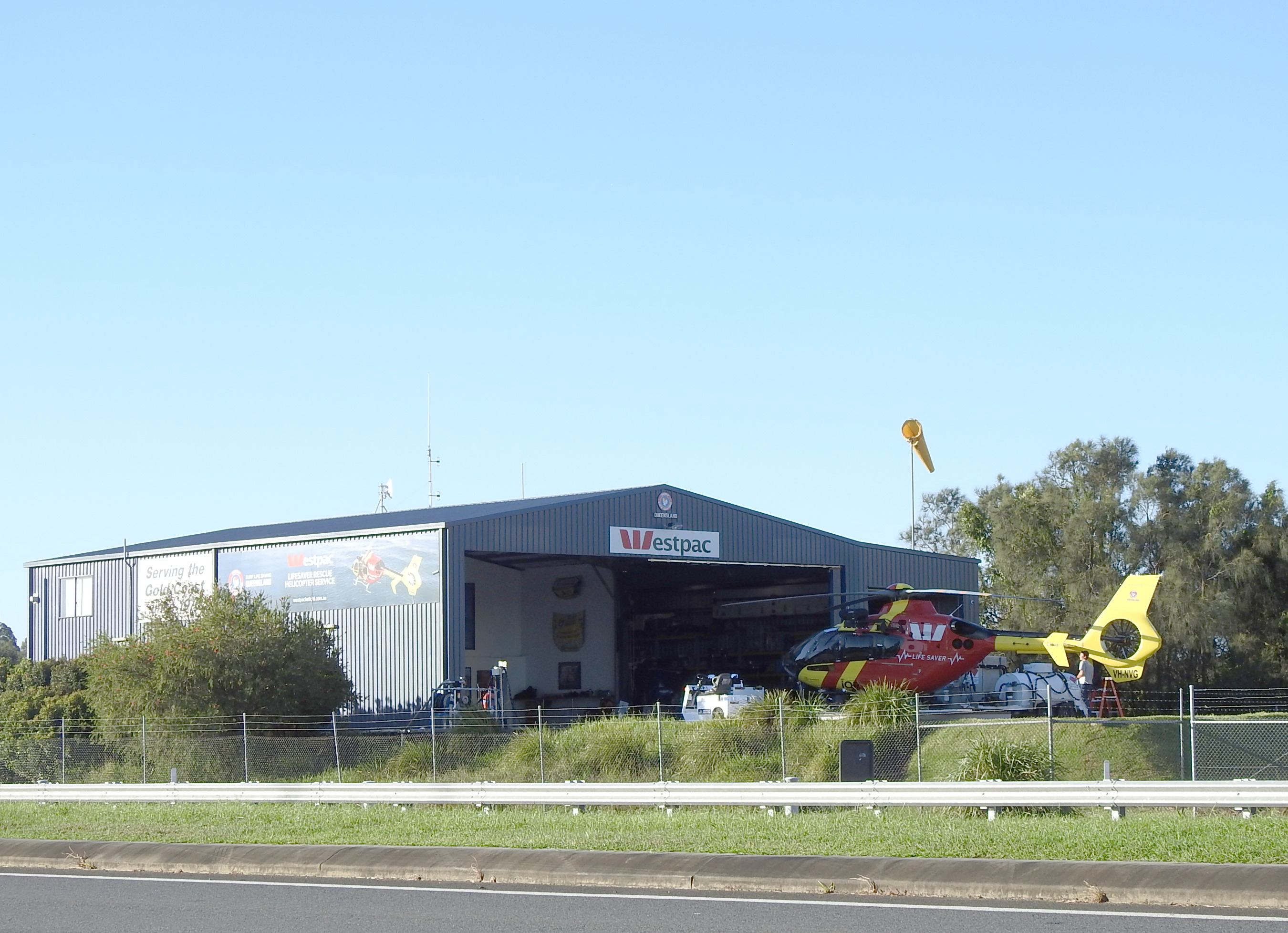
Westpac Lifesaver Rescue Helicopter Service facility (2021).

The Westpac Lifesaver Rescue Helicopter Service has a heliport at 282-294 Nerang Broadbeach Road (28.0035°S 153.3626°E).

Carrara SES Facility is at 120 Eastlake Street (28.0373°S 153.3566°E) within the Gold Coast City Council Depot.

Carrara Health Centre is at 45 Chisholm Road and is part of Robina Hospital (28.0029°S 153.3542°E).

== Amenities ==
Boonooroo Park Shopping Centre is at 2 Coelia Court (28.0166°S 153.3517°E).

Carrara Water Ski School teaches water skiing on the Nerang River at 556 Nerang Broadbeach Road (28.0116°S 153.3743°E).

There is a boat ramp on Carrara Road providing access to the Nerang River (28.0167°S 153.3869°E). It is managed by the Gold Coast City Council.

=== Churches ===
Reach Out for Christ is a church at 288 Gooding Drive (28.0343°S 153.3800°E).

Liberti Carrara is a Baptist church at 1/20 Indy Court (27.9988°S 153.3547°E).

=== Golf courses ===
Carrara has a number of golf courses, including:

- Carrara Gardens Day and Night Golf Course, a 10-hole course at 221 Nerang Broadbeach Road (28.0036°S 153.3616°E)
- Emerald Lakes Golf Course, an 18-hole course at 3 Alabaster Drive (28.0115°S 153.3626°E)
- Palm Meadows Golf Course, an 18-hold course on Palm Meadows Drive (28.0280°S 153.3789°E)

=== Parks ===
There are a number of parks in the suburb, including:

- Alan Nielsen Park (28.0185°S 153.3588°E)
- Alan Nielsen Recreational Park (28.0166°S 153.3579°E)
- Alison Place (28.0236°S 153.3661°E)
- Amelia Park (28.0122°S 153.3485°E)
- Ancona Street Reserve (28.0146°S 153.3503°E)
- Birmingham Sports Fields (28.0182°S 153.3698°E)
- Bluestone Park (28.0139°S 153.3570°E)
- Boonooroo Park (central) (28.0228°S 153.3578°E)
- Boonooroo Park (east) (28.0257°S 153.3641°E)
- Boonooroo Park (west) (28.0232°S 153.3527°E)
- Bradstone Reserve (28.0317°S 153.3591°E)
- Carrara Railway Parklands (28.0215°S 153.3513°E)
- Carrara Sports Complex (28.0059°S 153.3642°E)
- Depot Drain Reserve (28.0362°S 153.3549°E)
- Emerald Lake Wetlands (28.0201°S 153.3756°E)
- Foxhill Reserve (28.0270°S 153.3544°E)
- Gem Stone Park (28.0123°S 153.3560°E)
- Glennon Park (28.0014°S 153.3485°E)
- Glennon Park Linkage (28.0023°S 153.3538°E)
- Goolagong Park (28.0286°S 153.3907°E)
- Industrial Reserve (28.0109°S 153.3468°E)
- Jade Stone Park (28.0137°S 153.3560°E)
- Jancoon Court Reserve (28.0077°S 153.3529°E)
- John Francis Drive Park (28.0084°S 153.3470°E)
- Kath & John Hamilton Park (28.0191°S 153.3864°E)
- Keith Williams Park (28.0138°S 153.3815°E)
- Len Parr Park (28.0176°S 153.3845°E)
- Lions Park (28.0195°S 153.3655°E)
- Madigan Park (28.0208°S 153.3685°E)
- May John Reserve (28.0214°S 153.3540°E)
- Meadow View Drive Reserve (28.0243°S 153.3821°E)
- Mullingar Park (28.0076°S 153.3468°E)
- Nielsens Road Reserve (28.0198°S 153.3573°E)
- Paddington Drive Reserve (28.0073°S 153.3499°E)
- Palm Meadows Baseball Facility (28.0295°S 153.3736°E)
- Pappas Way Reserve (28.0103°S 153.3543°E)
- Pappas Way West Reserve (28.0103°S 153.3517°E)
- Pidd Family Park (28.0168°S 153.3867°E)
- Solomon Court Reserve (28.0082°S 153.3509°E)
- Spall Street Park (28.0309°S 153.3540°E)
- Spencer Road Big Reserve (28.0067°S 153.3458°E)
- Spencer Road Reserve (28.0094°S 153.3475°E)
- Stoner Family Park (28.0412°S 153.3595°E)
- Tralee Park (28.0100°S 153.3493°E)
- Witt Avenue Reserves (28.0240°S 153.3850°E)

== Events ==
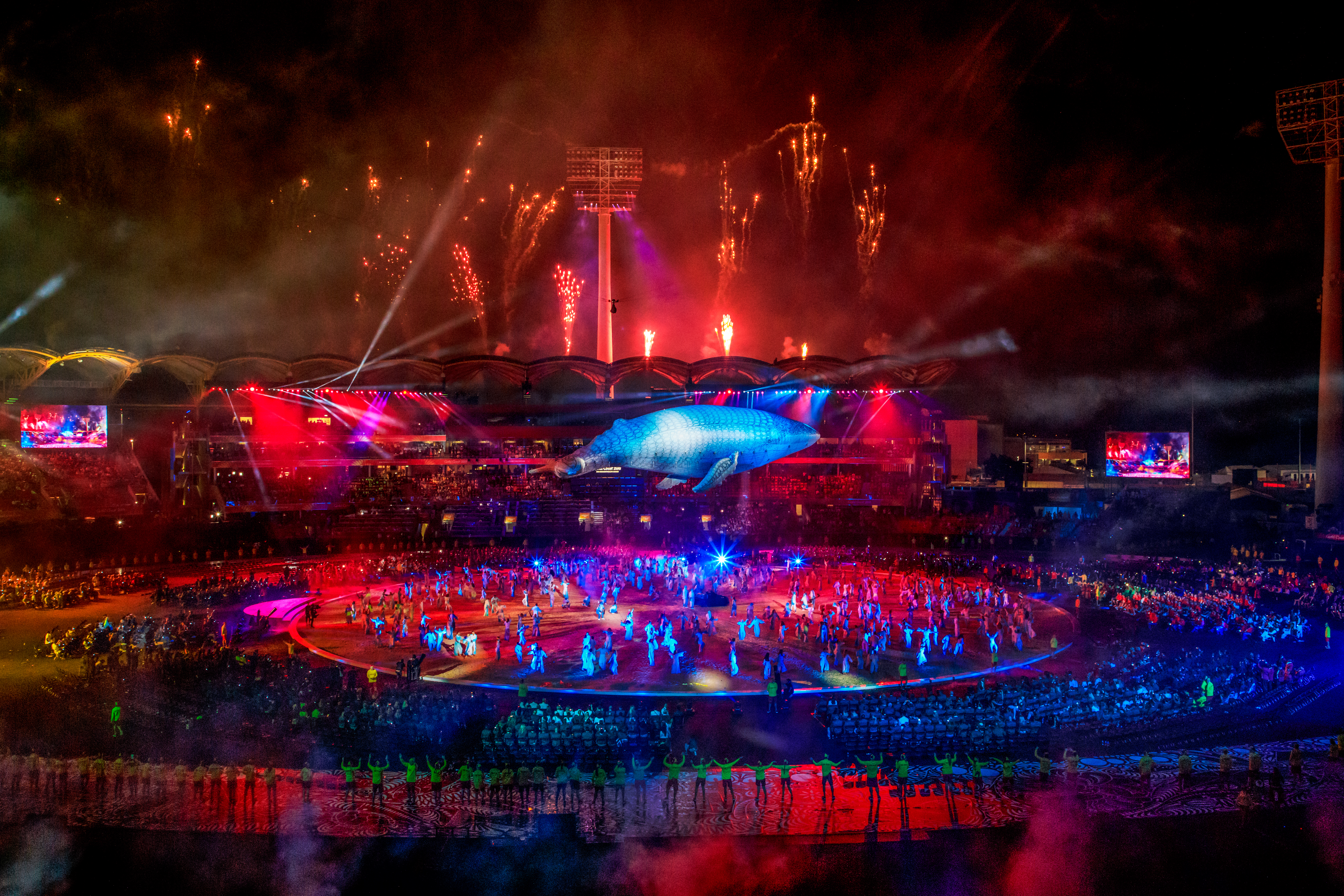
Opening ceremony of the 2018 Commonwealth Games at the Carrara Stadium

Operating every weekend, the Carrara Markets are a variety of local stores and attractions for people living within the region. An Entertainment Precinct is expected to be built opposite the Sports Precinct and will include a showgrounds area that will see the area host the Gold Coast Show, as well as musical festivals such as Big Day Out.

The Carrara Stadium hosted the 2018 Commonwealth Games opening and closing ceremonies, as well as a variety of musical related tours and events. These include, but are not limited to, Kiss' Farewell Tour in 2001, the final edition of the Queen + Adam Lambert's Rhapsody Tour within the continent and an edition of Foo Fighters' Wasting Light Tour in 2011.

== Sport and recreation ==
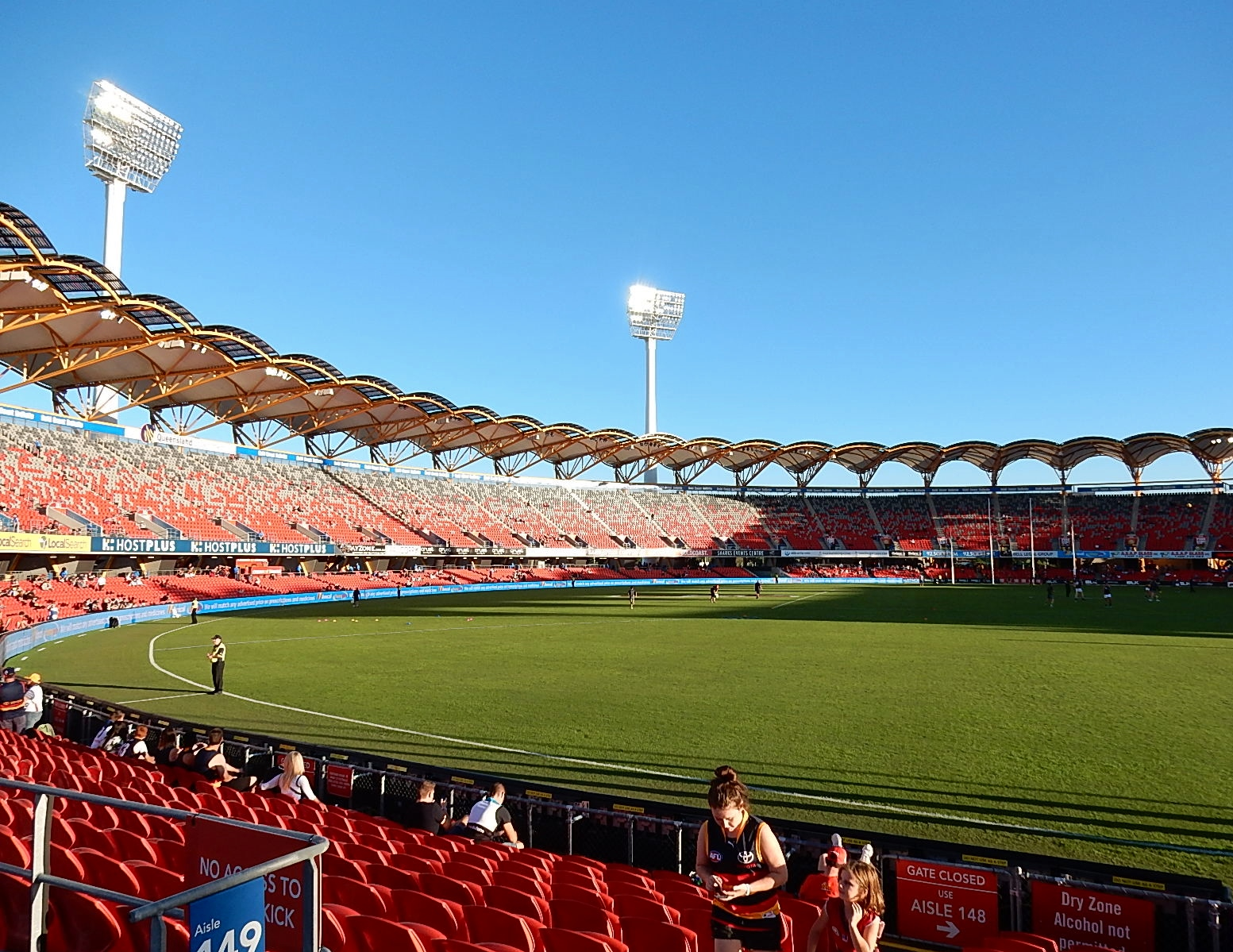
View of the field and grandstand at Carrara Stadium

The Carrara Sports Precinct consists of a number of sports facilities located on Nerang−Broadbeach Road, including Carrara Stadium and Carrara Indoor Stadium. Carrara Stadium is home to the Australian rules football club, Gold Coast Suns, competing in the AFL and the AFL Women's. The outdoor facility also serves as a secondary ground for the T20 cricket sides, the Brisbane Heat and women's team, both competing within the Big Bash and the Women's Big Bash respectively. The indoor stadium previously hosted the now defunct Gold Coast Rollers, where they competed in the National Basketball League.

Carrara is also home to the soccer team Magic United, as well as the Palm Meadows and Emerald Lakes golf courses.

The Carrara Sports Precinct was the main stadium of the 2018 Commonwealth Games, hosting sports including Athletics, Badminton, Basketball and Gymnastics throughout the duration of the tournament.

== See also ==
- 2018 Commonwealth Games
- Gold Coast, Queensland
