= Bundall, Queensland =

Bundall Gold Coast, Queensland
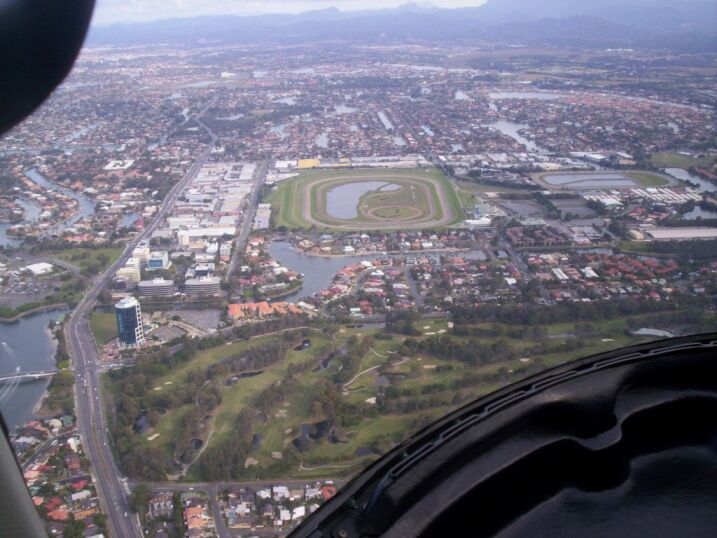
- Aerial view of Bundall from the north looking south (racecourse centre, sewerage works right), 2005

- Coordinates: 28.0116°S 153.4052°E
- Population: 4,895 (2021 census)
  - Density: 1,255/km^{2} (3,250/sq mi)
- Established: 1862
- Postcode(s): 4217
- Elevation: 2 m (7 ft)
- Area: 3.9 km^{2} (1.5 sq mi)
- Time zone: AEST (UTC+10:00)
- Location: 2.6 km (2 mi) SE of Surfers Paradise; 6.0 km (4 mi) S of Southport; 76.9 km (48 mi) SSE of Brisbane; 30 km (19 mi) N of Tweed Heads
- LGA(s): City of Gold Coast
- State electorate(s): Surfers Paradise; Southport
- Federal division(s): Moncrieff
Suburbs around Bundall:
Ashmore	Southport	Surfers Paradise
Benowa	Bundall	Surfers Paradise
Benowa	Broadbeach Waters	Broadbeach Waters

Bundall is a suburb in the City of Gold Coast, Queensland, Australia. In the 2021 census, Bundall had a population of 4,895 people.

== Geography ==
Bundall is bounded by the Slayter Road to the north (27.9978°S 153.4075°E), Bundall Road to the east (28.0064°S 153.4129°E), Nerang River to the south-east and south (28.0291°S 153.4046°E), and an unnamed canal from the Nerang River to the south-west and west (28.0060°S 153.3982°E).

Sorrento is a neighbourhood within the south of Bundall (28°01′04″S 153°24′03″E). It takes its name from a canal real estate development on the Nerang River that created 800 waterfront blocks and 400 "dry" blocks. The northernmost part of the suburb near the canals is also used for housing. There are commercial buildings to the north of Ashmore Road and the west of Bundall Road. The centre of the suburb provides a range of civic infrastructure including Southport Racecourse (with naming rights as Aquis Park 28.005°S 153.408°E) and associated businesses and the Benowa Effluent re-pump station, part of the city's sewage and recycled water infrastructure (28.006°S 153.401°E).

== History ==
The name Bundall is from the Aboriginal word for a species of prickly vine. The area was originally settled by British landowner Edmund Henry Price in 1862. He established the Bundall sugarcane plantation. The sugarcane was crushed at the Benowa sugar mill. Subsequently, the land was used for dairy farming, until it was developed for urban use.

Bundall Provisional School opened on 21 September 1885. It was renamed Benowa Provisional School in November 1900. On 1 January 1909 it became Benowa State School.

In 1965, a group of Greek residents of the Gold Coast formed the Greek Orthodox Community of St Anna (Gold Coast and Districts) with the ambition of establishing a Greek Orthodox Church. In 1978, the first St Anna Greek Orthodox Church was built on land donated by Greek entrepreneur Peter Vaggelas to fulfill a pledge that his wife Betty had made to St Anna during the difficult birth of their daughter. The present St Anna's Church at 31A Crombie Avenue was built on land donated by Jim Raptis, President of the Greek Community.

== Demographics ==
In the 2016 census, Bundall had a population of 4,523 people. The median age of the Bundall population was 42 years, 4 years above the national median of 38. 65.5% of people were born in Australia. The most common countries of birth were New Zealand 7.4% and England 4.4%. 80.0% of people only spoke English at home. Other languages spoken at home included Mandarin at 3.1%. The most common responses for religion were No Religion 28.7%, Catholic 24.1% and Anglican 21.1%.

In the 2021 census, Bundall had a population of 4,895 people.

== Heritage listings ==
There are a number of heritage sites in Bundall, including:

- 8 Elliott Street: Gold Coast and Hinterland Historical Society Grounds

== Slatyer Avenue ==
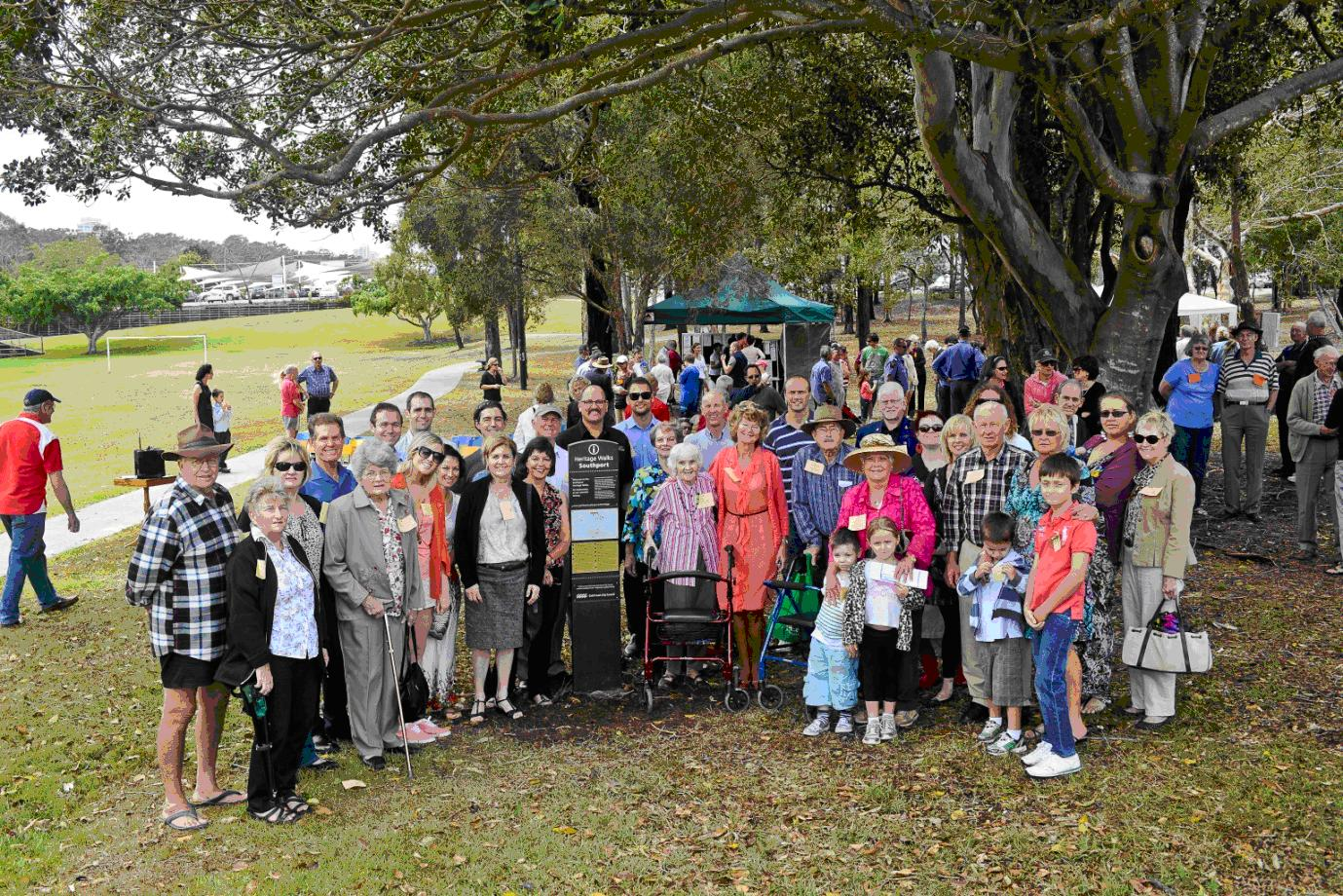
Family members at the dedication of the Southport Park Streets Heritage sign on 11 November 2012

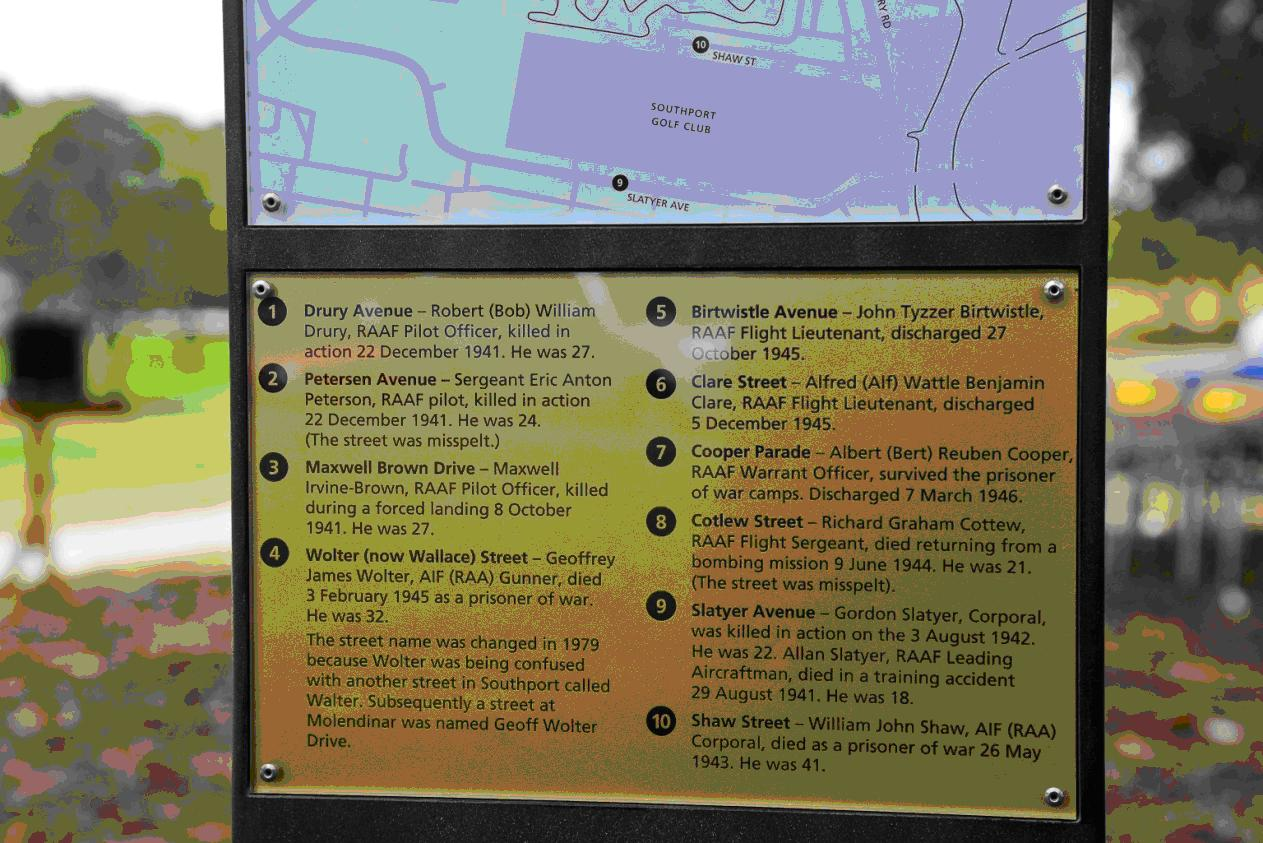
The Slatyer entries on the Southport Park Streets Heritage Sign

Slatyer Avenue is one of eleven local streets named after young men who died on active service in World War II. When the Bradbrook family farm at Bundall was subdivided for housing in the 1950s, Slatyer Avenue was named after two brothers – Allan and Gordon Slatyer, the only children of Francis Leichhardt and Hilda (Peggy) Slatyer of Surfers Paradise. Allan, an RAAF leading aircraftman, died in a training accident at Wagga Wagga on 29 August 1941. He was 18 years old. Gordon, an AIF infantryman, was killed in action on 3 August 1942 at El Alamein, Egypt. He was 22 years old.

== Education ==
There are no schools in Bundall. The nearest government primary schools are Surfers Paradise State School in neighbouring Surfers Paradise to the east, Benowa State School in neighbouring Benowa to the west and Bellevue Park State School in neighbouring Ashmore to the north-west. The nearest government secondary schools are Benowa State High School in neighbouring Benowa to the west and Keebra Park State High School in neighbouring Southport to the north.

== Sport ==
Bundall is also the home of the Bundall Iceland Ice Rink, home of the Bartercard Gold Coast Blue Tongues ice hockey club, Queensland's only team in the Australian Ice Hockey League.

== Amenities ==
St Anna's Greek Orthodox Church is at 31A Crombie Avenue (28.0023°S 153.4121°E). Its feast days are 25 July, 9 September and 9 December.

== Notable people ==
Notable people from or who have lived in Bundall include:

- Justin Hickey, businessman, insurance executive and philanthropist

== See also ==
- Suburbs of the Gold Coast
