= Ashmore, Queensland =

Ashmore
- Suburb
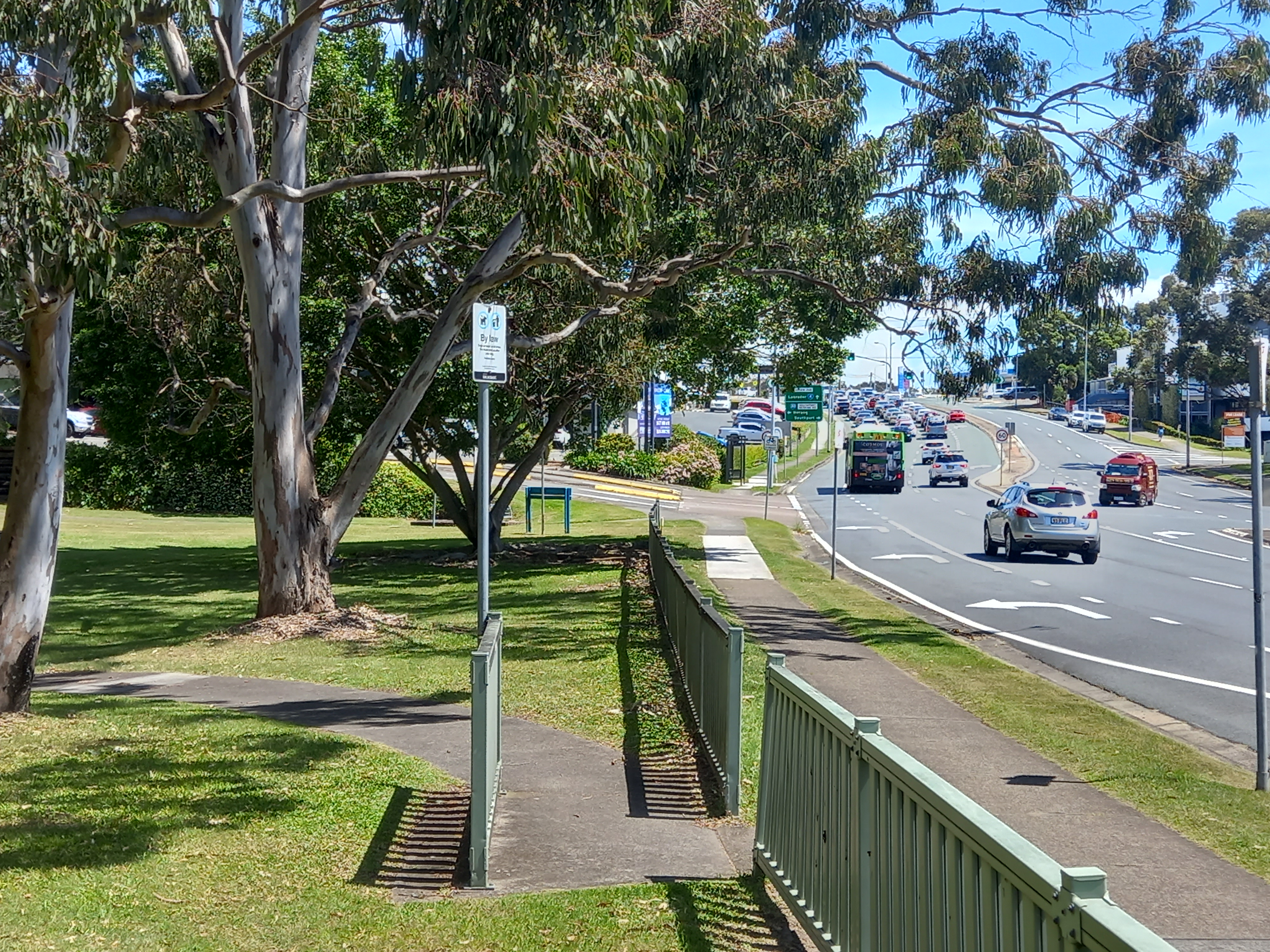
- Lions Park along Currumburra Road, 2022

- Interactive map of Ashmore
- Coordinates: 27.9891°S 153.3786°E
- Country: Australia
- State: Queensland
- City: Gold Coast
- LGA: City of Gold Coast
- Location: 4.9 km (3.0 mi) WSW of Southport; 5.0 km (3.1 mi) WNW of Surfers Paradise; 73.1 km (45.4 mi) SSE of Brisbane
- Established: 1972

Government
  - State electorate: Southport
  - Federal division: Moncrieff

Area
  - Total: 6.8 km^{2} (2.6 sq mi)

Population
  - Total: 12,415 (2021 census)
  - Density: 1,826/km^{2} (4,730/sq mi)
- Time zone: UTC+10:00 (AEST)
- Postcode: 4214
Suburbs around Ashmore
| Molendinar | Southport | Southport |
| Nerang | Ashmore | Southport |
| Carrara | Benowa | Bundall |

Ashmore is a suburb of the City of Gold Coast, Queensland, Australia. In the 2021 census, Ashmore had a population of 12,415 people.

== Geography ==
The Southport–Nerang Road bounds the suburb to the north, while the Pacific Motorway forms the short western boundary. It is bounded to the -south west by the Nerang River.

The Gold Coast railway line enters the location from the north-west (Molendinar) and exits to the west (Nerang).

The land use is predominantly suburban housing with some business parks and industrial parks. There is a small area of farm land on either side of the railway line.

== History ==
In October 1887, in the area now known as Ashmore and Benowa, 5 subdivisions comprising the Benowa Estate and Plantation on the Nerang River were advertised to be auctioned by James R. Dickson. A map advertising the auction states the Estate was located 4 miles to Southport bound by a good road on one side and bound by the navigable Nerang River on the other side. Extensive buildings and plant for sugar manufacturing were included in the estate.

In the 1970s, Jim Donellon, a property investor from Sydney, purchased and developed a housing estate called Ashmore Village. The Ashmore Plaza Shopping Centre was developed by the late 1970s.

Ashmore State School opened on 23 January 1978.

Trinity Lutheran Primary School opened in Cotlew Street on 27 January 1981.

The suburb was officially bounded and named Ashmore on 1 December 1982.

Bellevue Park State School opened on 24 January 1983 in Southport. It is now within Ashmore.

Trinity Lutheran College opened on Ashmore Road as a secondary school on 28 January 1987. In 2002 it amalgamated with the Trinity Lutheran Primary School under the name Trinity Lutheran College. The early and junior year students are at the Cotlew Street campus while the middle and senior students are at the Ashmore Road campus.

== Demographics ==
In the 2011 census, Ashmore recorded a population of 11,586 people, 52.5% female and 47.5% male. The median age of the Ashmore population was 40 years, 3 years above the national median of 37. 65.7% of people living in Ashmore were born in Australia. The other top responses for country of birth were New Zealand 9.2%, England 4.9%, Japan 1.1%, Scotland 0.7%, Korea, Republic of 0.7%. 82.9% of people spoke only English at home; the next most common languages were 1.5% Japanese, 0.9% Korean, 0.6% German, 0.6% Greek, 0.5% Mandarin.

In the 2016 census, Ashmore had a population of 11,910 people.

In the 2021 census, Ashmore had a population of 12,415 people.

== Education ==
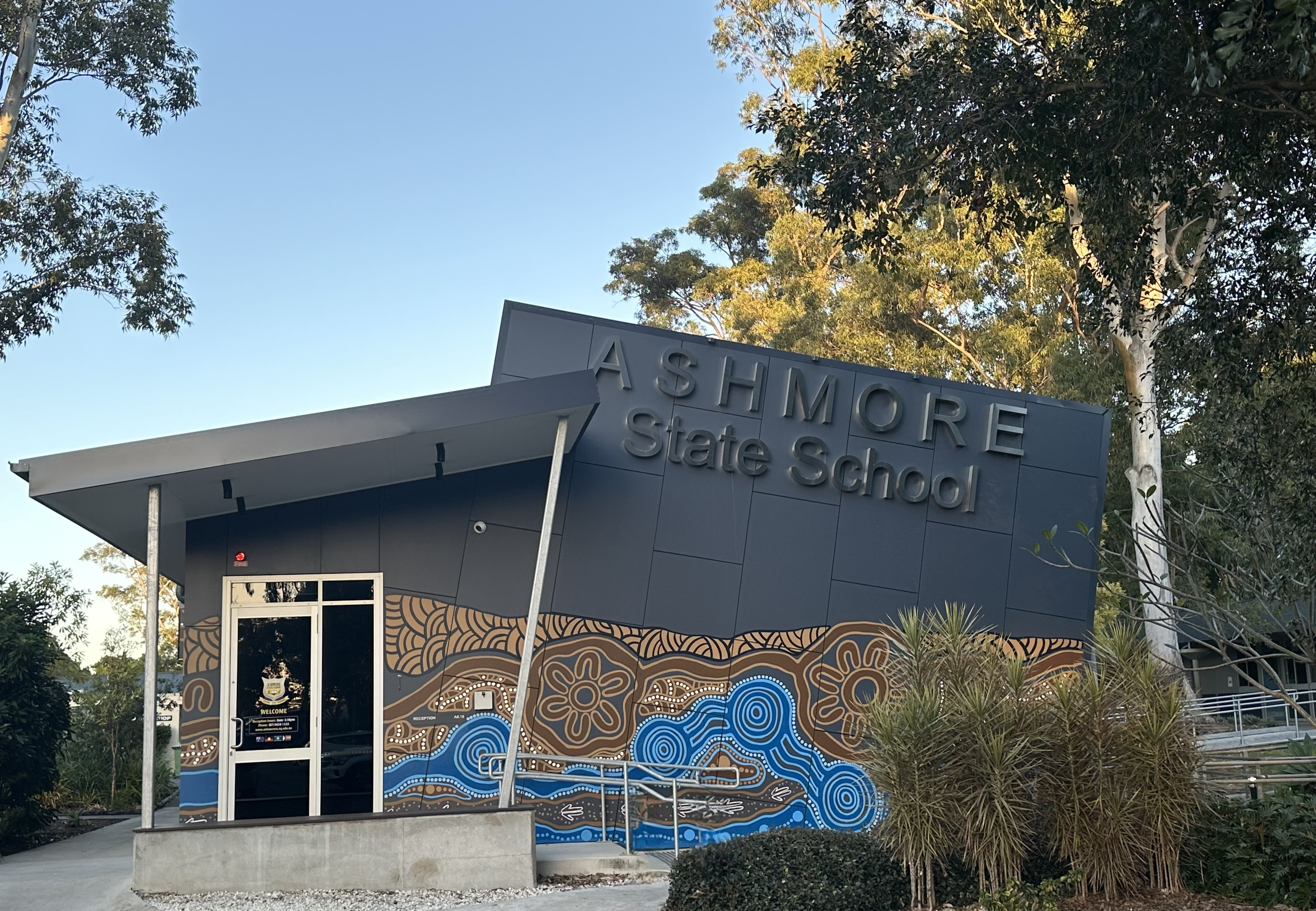
Ashmore State School, 2024

Ashmore State School is a government primary (Prep-6) school for boys and girls on Currumburra Road (27.9891°S 153.3813°E). In 2018, the school had an enrolment of 894 students with 59 teachers (52 full-time equivalent) and 32 non-teaching staff (23 full-time equivalent). It includes a special education program.

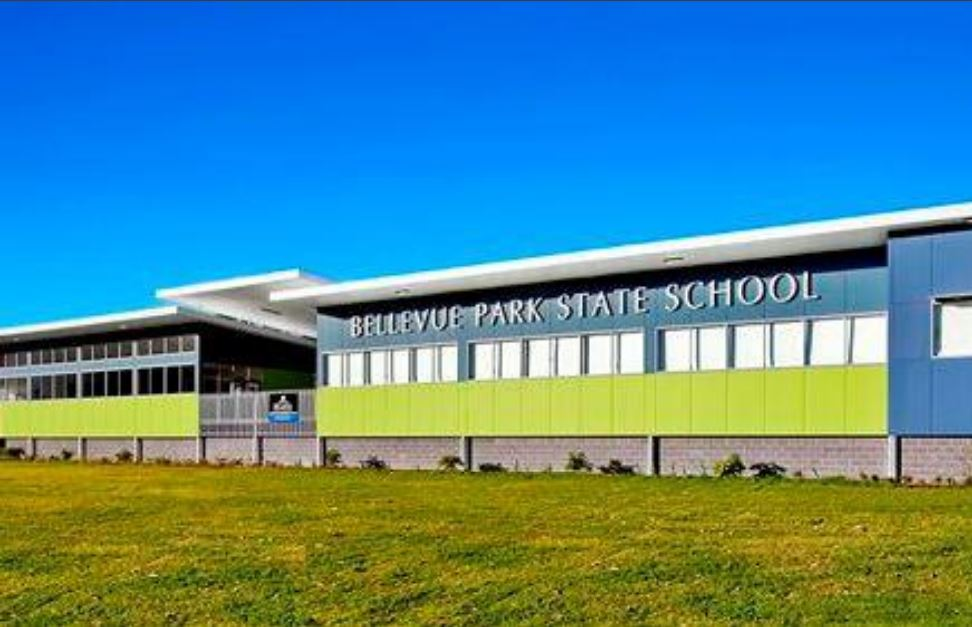
Bellevue Park State School, 2025

Bellevue Park State School is a government primary (Prep-6) school for boys and girls on Sapium Road (27.9956°S 153.3962°E). In 2018, the school had an enrolment of 636 students with 42 teachers (39 full-time equivalent) and 29 non-teaching staff (19 full-time equivalent). It includes a special education program.

Trinity Lutheran College is a private primary and secondary (6-12) school for boys and girls with two campuses, with the Prep-5 campus at 251 Cotlew Street (27.9844°S 153.3714°E) and the 6-12 campus at 641 Ashmore Road (27.9791°S 153.3633°E). In 2018, the school had an enrolment of 1,082 students with 86 teachers (78 full-time equivalent) and 61 non-teaching staff (33 full-time equivalent).

There are no government secondary schools in Ashmore. The nearest government secondary schools are Keebra Park State High School in neighbouring Southport to the east, Benowa State High School in neighbouring Benowa to the south, and Nerang State High School in neighbouring Nerang to the west.

Gold Coast Institute of TAFE also has one campus located in Ashmore. It is on the corner of Heeb Street and Benowa Road.

== Amenities ==
The main retail area of Ashmore is on Southport–Nerang Road, which features the Ashmore City Shopping Centre.

The Gold Coast City Council operates a fortnightly mobile library service which visits Ashmore Village Park (BMX Park) on Currumburra Road.

Ashmore Uniting Church is at 144 Cotlew Street (27.9872°S 153.3854°E). It opened circa 1990.

Mary Immaculate Catholic Church is at 31 Edmund Rice Drive (27.9740°S 153.3848°E). It opened in 1988.

== Natural environment ==
Pre-clearing, the vegetation of Ashmore included substantial areas of blackbutt (Eucalyptus pilularis) tall open forest on lowland metamorphosed sediments. This ecosystem type is now listed as endangered with extinction in Queensland having been extensively cleared for agriculture and housing development.

The area now occupied by Royal Pines resort once supported established Eucalyptus tereticornis forests and wetlands with patches of rainforest. Jabiru, magpie geese and a variety of water birds used these wetlands which stretched from Nerang to near Burleigh Heads along the floodplain of the Nerang River Valley and Mudgeereebah and Bonogin Creeks. This ecosystem was akin to Kakadu with lagoons of lilypads, swamp rainforest and gnarled old paperbark forest filled with palms. In the 1980s prior to the development of Royal Pines resort, farmland with remnant degraded wetlands and some forest remained, and jabiru, spoonbills, magpie geese and a variety of other birds could be seen there. Development in recent decades has led to the loss of most remnant natural vegetation.

== See also ==
- Suburbs of the Gold Coast
