= Foxwell State Secondary College =

Location
- 282 Foxwell Road; Coomera, Queensland; Australia
- Coordinates: 27.854°S 153.33°E

Information
- Type: Public, secondary
- Motto: In Scientia opportunitas (In knowledge there is opportunity)
- Established: 2020
- Principal: Melanie Harth
- Grades: 7–11(2024); 7–12 from 2025
- Enrolment: 522 (2021)
- Colours: Navy blue, wattle yellow and white
- Website: foxwellssc.eq.edu.au

Foxwell State Secondary College is a coeducational public secondary school based in Coomera on the Gold Coast in Queensland, Australia. The school has a total enrolment of more than 200 students, with an official count of 522 students in August 2021. The school's role of Principal is currently held by Melanie Harth, Kym Amor was appointed as the Foundation Principal of the school in 2019. The school also consists of four Deputy Principals, one Business Manager, one Head of Inclusion, five Heads of Department and one Guidance Officer.

== Facilities ==
Stage 1 of Foxwell State Secondary College's facilities was completed under the development of FKG Group and Universal Civil Contracting in January 2020. These facilities include Science, Technology, Engineering and Mathematics (STEM) classrooms, a multipurpose sports hall, a learning hub and an amphitheatre with a seating capacity of approximately 200 students.

Stage 2 of Foxwell State Secondary College's facilities commenced in December 2020 under the development of FKG Group and Universal Civil Contracting. These facilities consist of a Performing Arts centre as well as classrooms incorporating the subjects of Science, Hospitality, Applied Technology and Senior Art & Design.

== See also ==
- List of schools in Gold Coast, Queensland
- Secondary school
