= William Duncan State School =

Location
- Nerang, Gold Coast, Queensland, Australia
- Coordinates: 28.0144°S 153.3341°E

Information
- School type: Public
- Motto: Honor Strength Trust "A United School of Excellence"
- Established: 1987
- Principal: Rachael Jeffrey
- Grades: Preparatory to Year 6
- Enrolment: 570 (2023)
- Houses: Lachlan, Stewart, Campbell, Macintosh
- Colours: Red and green
- Newspaper: The Highlander
- Website: Official website

William Duncan State School (WDSS) is a public co-educational primary school located in the City of Gold Coast suburb of Highland Park, Queensland, Australia. It is administered by the Department of Education, with an enrolment of 570 students and a teaching staff of 45, as of 2023. The school serves students from Prep to Year 6, and was named after William Duncan, one of the first white settlers in the Nerang area.

== History ==
The school opened on 27 January 1987, prior to the naming of the then housing estate that it was located in, which was formally named as a suburb in 2003.

In 2010, the school introduced a school rule that banned students from hugging, which was received negatively, being blamed on excessive political correctness, even being compared to the slogan on fighting drug abuse 'Hugs not drugs'. It was abolished soon after, due to the criticism it received.

The next year, in 2011, the school introduced another school rule, which banned students from rolling up their jumper sleeves, which was not received well. It is unclear if this rule was abolished.

== Current day ==
The school has created a new motto aside their other one, "A United School of Excellence". They have also developed a new initiative called the "Centre of Musical Excellence" (CME) (established in 2014). This program is especially for musically orientated students. There are special CME classes for those students. They have a great learning system with a recently built building (completed in late 2011) including a kitchen, science lab, new library, computer lab, toilet, and meeting rooms.

== Facilities ==
In this school there are 2 senior girl and boy toilet blocks, 1 junior girl and boy toilet block, a teachers library, student library, science room, kitchen, junior oval, senior oval, junior playground (2), senior playground and multi-purpose courts. Every classroom has an interactive white board. In many of the ICT lessons they have the use an iPad to help them research things for their lessons. They are also taught some essential keys to learning and researching.

== See also ==
- List of schools in Gold Coast, Queensland
