= Worongary =

- Suburb
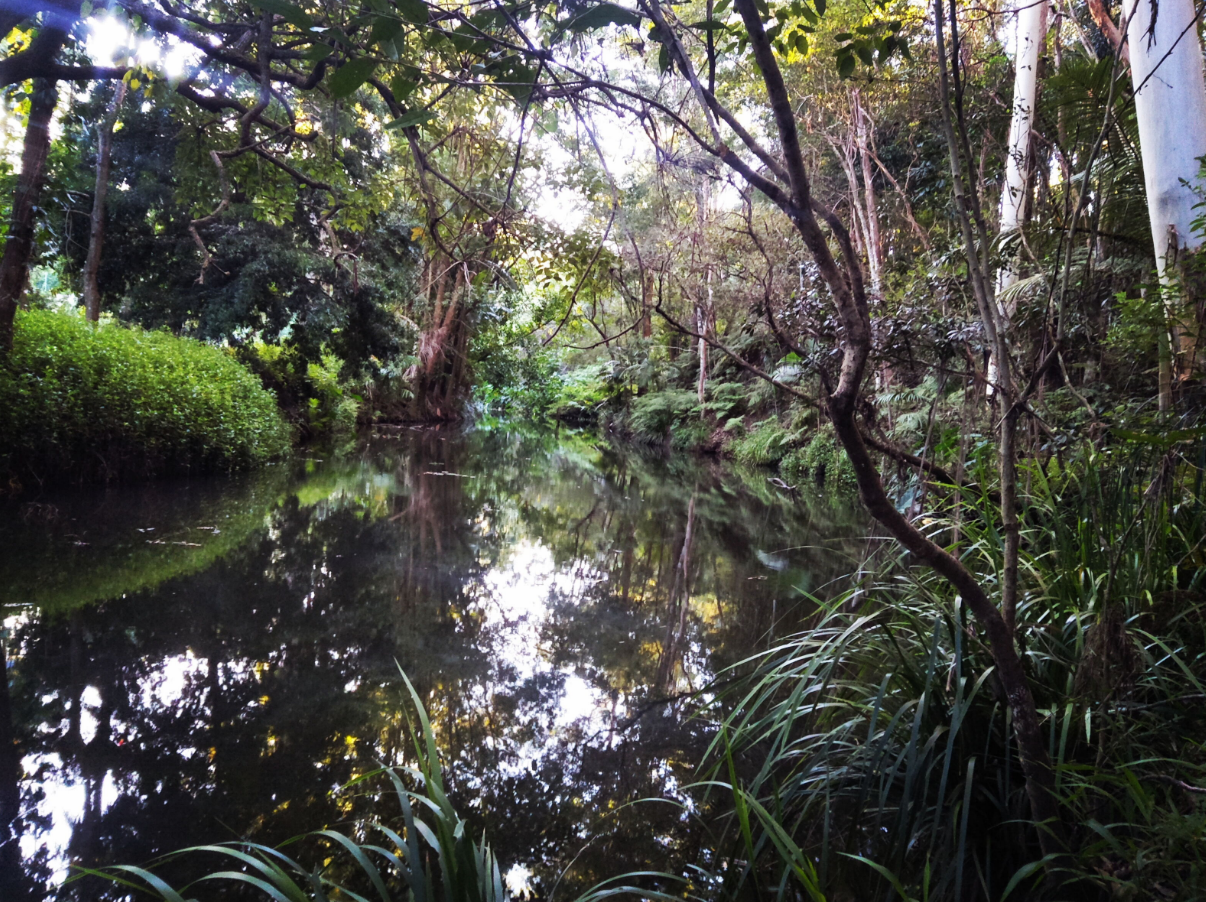
- Worongary Creek

- Interactive map of Worongary
- Coordinates: 28.0416°S 153.3377°E
- Country: Australia
- State: Queensland
- City: Gold Coast City
- LGA: City of Gold Coast
- Location: 12.7 km (7.9 mi) SW of Surfers Paradise; 13.7 km (8.5 mi) SW of Southport; 75.4 km (46.9 mi) SSE of Brisbane CBD

Government
  - State electorate: Mudgeeraba
  - Federal division: Wright

Area
  - Total: 14.1 km^{2} (5.4 sq mi)

Population
  - Total: 6,021 (2021 census)
  - Density: 427.0/km^{2} (1,106/sq mi)
- Time zone: UTC+10:00 (AEST)
- Postcode: 4213
Suburbs around Worongary
Gilston	Highland Park	Carrara
Gilston	Worongary	Merrimac
Tallai	Tallai	Mudgeeraba

Worongary is a suburb in the City of Gold Coast, Queensland, Australia. In the 2021 census, Worongary had a population of 6,021 people.

== Geography ==
Most of the eastern boundary of Worongary follows the Pacific Motorway.

There is a large area of production forestry in the north-west of the suburb. The north-eastern part of the suburb is predominantly residential at suburb densities. The middle and south of the suburb is mostly rural residential with larger blocks of land, typically 4,000 to 5,000 square metres (0.99 to 1.24 acres).

== History ==
The name Worongary is derived from an Aboriginal word Whorrongary, meaning vine or flight of a pigeon.

The Worongary State School opened on 1 February 1993.

Hinterland Baptist Church was established in 1995. Its timber church building was relocated from another site.

== Demographics ==
In the 2016 census, Worongary had a population of 5,613 people.

In the 2021 census, Worongary had a population of 6,021 people.

== Heritage listings ==
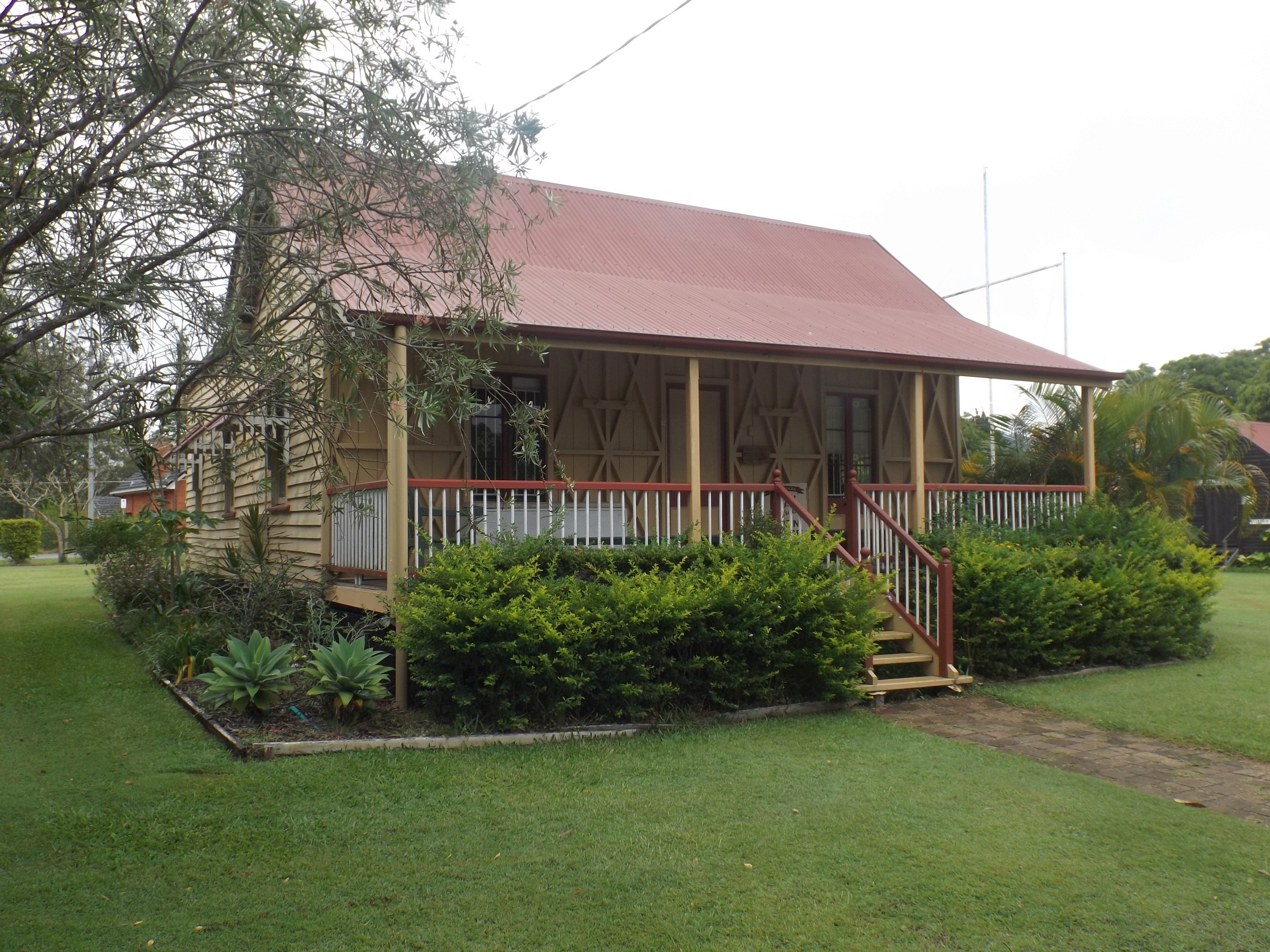
Schmidt Farmhouse, 2016

Worongary has a number of heritage-listed sites, including:

- former Schmidt Farmhouse, 8 Worongary Road (28.0616°S 153.354°E)

== Education ==
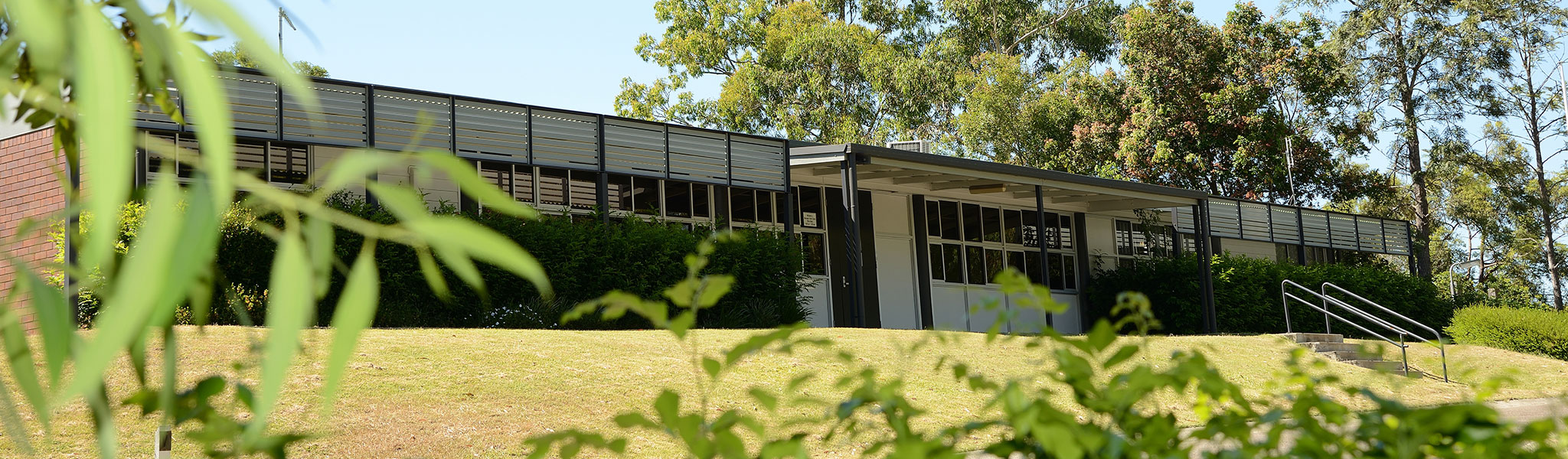
Worongary State School, circa 2022

Worongary State School is a government primary (Prep-6) school for boys and girls at Delta Cove Drive (28.0227°S 153.3419°E). In 2018, the school had an enrolment of 699 students with 49 teachers (43 full-time equivalent) and 29 non-teaching staff (18 full-time equivalent). It includes a special education program.

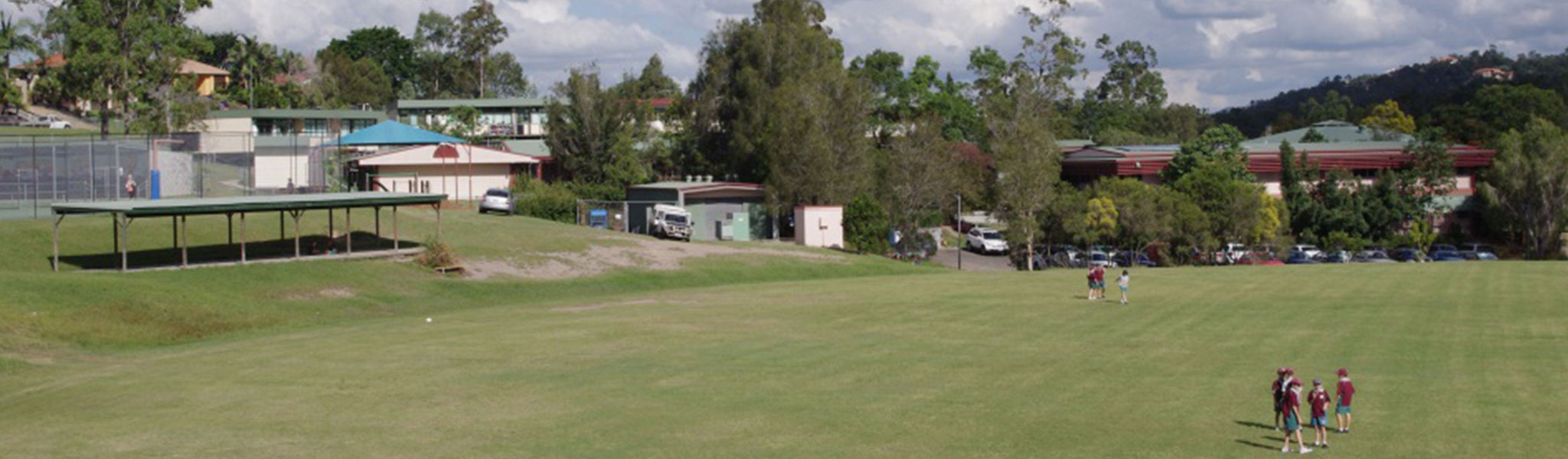
Sports field, Worongary State School, circa 2022

There are no secondary schools in Worongary. The nearest government secondary schools are Nerang State High School in Nerang to the north and Robina State High School in Robina to the south-east.

== Amenities ==
Despite the name, Mudgeeraba Showgrounds are at 115 Mudgeeraba Road in Worongary (28.0606°S 153.3547°E).

The Springbrook Mudgeeraba branch of the Queensland Country Women's Association meets at the Bill Deacon Pavilion at the Mudgeeraba Showgrounds.

Hinterland Baptist Church is at 405 Hinkler Drive (28.0395°S 153.3521°E).

The Church of Jesus Christ of Latter Day Saints is at 74 Mudgeeraba Road (28.0572°S 153.35689°E).

=== Parks ===
There are a number of parks in the area:

- Alice Bowden Reserve (28.0487°S 153.3262°E)
- Alkira Park (28.0383°S 153.3509°E)
- Charles Kurz Drive Reserves (28.0534°S 153.3342°E)
- Darryl Randal Drive Parklands (28.0389°S 153.3297°E)
- Delta Reserve (28.0234°S 153.3415°E)
- Dorrigo Drainage Reserve (28.0236°S 153.3469°E)
- Explorers Way Northern Linear Park (28.0168°S 153.3365°E)
- Explorers Way Southern Linear Park (28.0210°S 153.3359°E)
- Fred Cass Family Park (28.0175°S 153.3440°E)
- Graham Dillon Park (28.0192°S 153.3486°E)
- Handel Avenue Reserve (28.0438°S 153.3448°E)
- Harry Mills Drive Reserve (28.0470°S 153.3304°E)
- Incline Drive Reserve (28.0493°S 153.3213°E)
- Lawrance Hinde Park (28.0197°S 153.3403°E)
- Lexington Drive Reserve (28.0326°S 153.3467°E)
- Mataranka Drive Reserve (28.0220°S 153.3472°E)
- Mudgeeraba Road Parklands (28.0519°S 153.3548°E)
- Mudgeeraba Showgrounds (28.0604°S 153.3537°E)
- Nabarlek Park (28.0249°S 153.3451°E)
- Nancy Yaun Reserve (28.0508°S 153.3261°E)
- Pioneer Downs Park (28.0542°S 153.3374°E)
- Quambone Street Reserves (28.0441°S 153.3521°E)
- Random Way Reserves (28.0558°S 153.3410°E)
- San Fernando Dr Reserve (28.0446°S 153.3365°E)
- Thomas Duncan Reserve (28.0418°S 153.3244°E)
- Thredbo Rd Reserve (28.0571°S 153.3495°E)
- Upper Worongary Creek Reserve (28.0535°S 153.3276°E)
- Worangary Reservoir Parklands (28.0500°S 153.3434°E)
- Worongary Creek Reserve (28.0509°S 153.3311°E)

== Events ==
The Mudgeeraba Show Society runs an annual agricultural show known as the Mudgeeraba Show at the Showgrounds. It is held in June.

== Attractions ==
Gold Coast Light Horse Education Museum is at 8 Worongary Road (28.0616°S 153.3542°E) beside the Mudgeeraba Showgrounds. The museum has information about the Australian Light Horse who served in the Second Boer War and World War I. It also has information on national service in Australia.
