= Merrimac, Queensland =

Merrimac
- Suburb
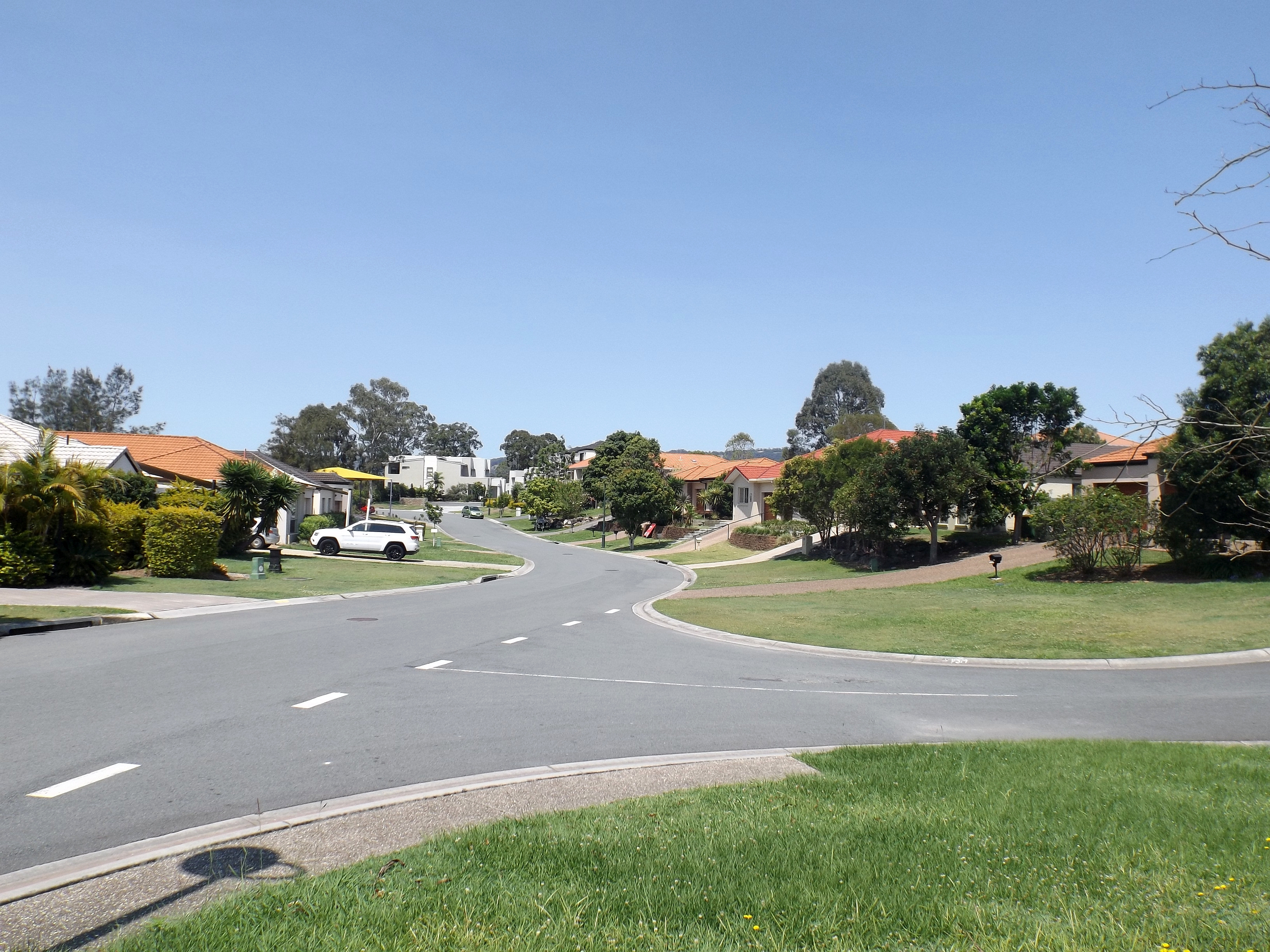
- Entry Drive in 2015

- Interactive map of Merrimac
- Coordinates: 28.0511°S 153.3744°E
- Country: Australia
- State: Queensland
- City: Gold Coast
- LGA: Gold Coast City
- Location: 10.4 km (6.5 mi) SW of Surfers Paradise; 14.7 km (9.1 mi) SSW of Southport; 27.1 km (16.8 mi) NW of Tweed Heads; 78.7 km (48.9 mi) SSE of Brisbane

Government
  - State electorate: Mudgeeraba
  - Federal divisions: McPherson; Moncrieff

Area
  - Total: 9.0 km^{2} (3.5 sq mi)
- Elevation: 4 m (13 ft)

Population
  - Total: 7,212 (2021 census)
  - Density: 801/km^{2} (2,075/sq mi)
- Time zone: UTC+10:00 (AEST)
- Postcode: 4226
Suburbs around Merrimac
Carrara	Carrara	Carrara
Worongary	Merrimac	Clear Island Waters
Mudgeeraba	Robina	Robina

Merrimac (/mɛrɪmæk/ MERR-i-mack) is a suburb in the City of Gold Coast, Queensland, Australia. In the 2021 census, Merrimac had a population of 7,212 people.

== Geography ==
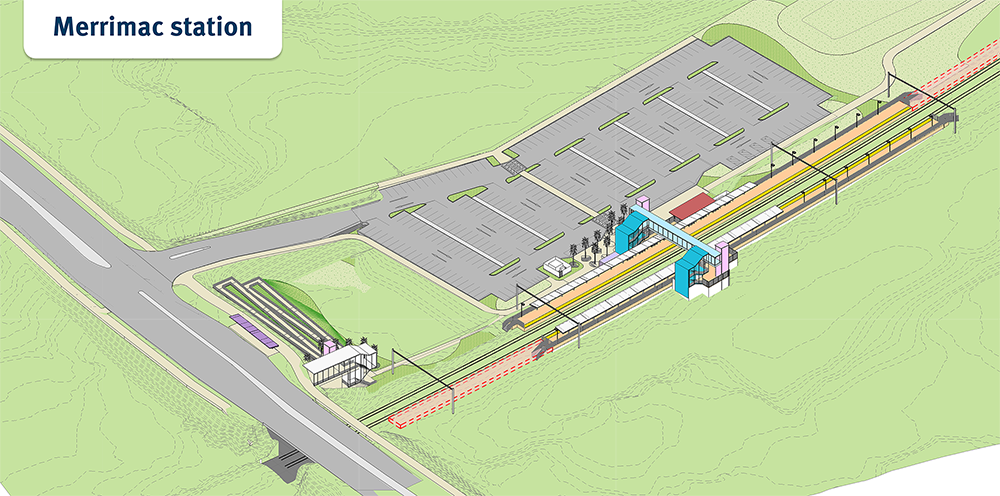
Merrimac railway station concept design, 2019

Merrimac is located on the floodplains in the central region of the city. Merrimac is the site of new housing and building developments as of March 2006.

The South East Queensland Infrastructure Plan and Program allows for an infill station to be constructed in Merrimac on the Gold Coast railway line, between the Nerang and Robina railway stations.

== History ==
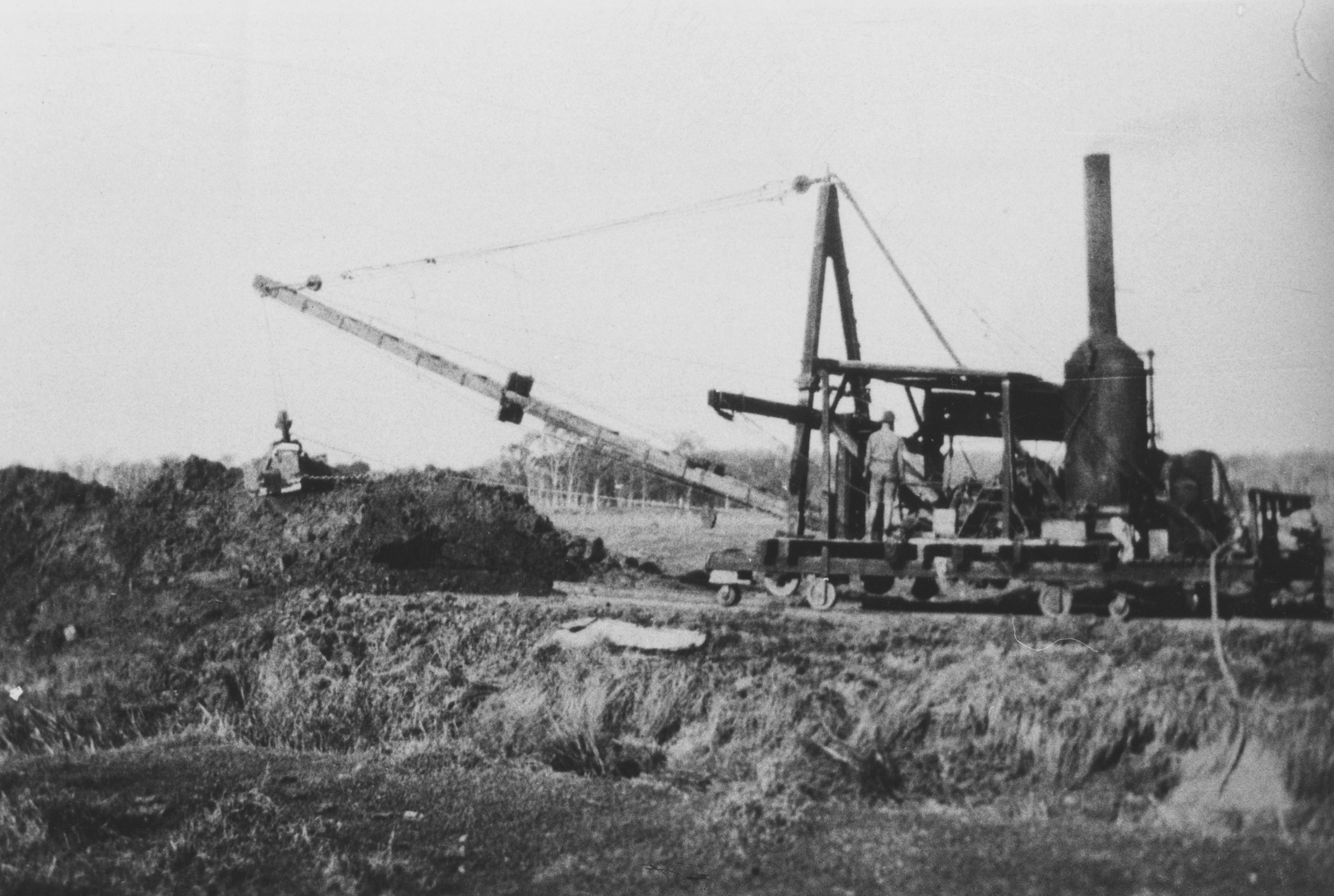
Digging a canal in swamp reclamation work at Merrimac, circa 1910

The origin of the name of the suburb is unclear. In 1873 Thomas Blacket Stephens purchased 6,980 acres (2,820 ha) of land; his wife Ann named the property Merrimac. In 1906, it was claimed to be named by the American Indian word for swift running waters. It has been suggested that it has been named after the Merrimack River in the New England region of the United States, or USS Merrimac, a Union navy frigate itself named for the river.

The land was swampy but Stephens and later his son William Stephens progressively drained the land and turned it into productive farming land, principally used for dairying, but also sheep, cattle and sugarcane. The Stephens family continued to purchase land, increasing the estate to approximately 14,000 acres (5,700 ha) In 1908, the family sold 11,000 acres (4,500 ha) at £4/15/0 per acre, believed to the highest price per acre of a property of that size at the time, to a syndicate from Victoria, which subdivided it into small farms known as the Stephens Estate.

Merrimac State School opened on 25 July 1917.

Merrimac State High School opened on 30 January 1979 (but is now within the suburb of Mermaid Waters).

St Michael's College opened on 4 February 1985.

St Michael's College opened its Carrara campus on 4 February 1985, but, as at 2021, this campus is within the boundaries of Merrimac.

All Saints Anglican School opened on 28 January 1987.

Gold Coast Jewish Day School opened in 1995 at 16A Ghilgai Road and was renamed King Solomon College on 1 January 1996. In 2007, the Gold Coast Montessori College relocated to share the King Solomon College site (having been originally established on 13 July 2002 at Lot 2, Mudgeeraba Road, Mudgeeraba). Faced with falling student numbers, King Solomon College suspended its operation on 18 July 2008. Gold Coast Montessori College closed on 31 October 2008. Two schools merged forming Queensland Independent College on 2 April 2009, closing on 16 June 2017.

The Queensland Football School took over the site of the Queensland Independent College at 16A Ghilgai Road to commence operation at January 2020, but the school did not open.

Star of the Sea School opened in 2022 at 16 Ghilgai Road.

== Demographics ==
In the 2016 census, Merrimac had a population of 7,071 people.

In the 2021 census, Merrimac had a population of 7,212 people.

== Heritage listings ==
There are a number of heritage sites in Merrimac, including:

- Merrimac Drains Historic Landscape (The Great Swamp) at 2 Ghilgai Road, 83 Macadie Way, and 6 Boowaggan Road

== Education ==
Merrimac State School is a government primary (Preparatory to Year 6) school for boys and girls at 2 Boowaggan Road (28.0412°S 153.3766°E). In 2017, the school had an enrolment of 809 students with 63 teachers (53 full-time equivalent) and 35 non-teaching staff (20 full-time equivalent). It includes a special education program.

Star of the Sea School is a Catholic primary school for boys and girls at 16 Ghilgai Road (28.0495°S 153.3677°E).

All Saints Anglican School is a private primary and secondary (Preparatory to Year 12) school for boys and girls at Highfield Drive (28.0608°S 153.3611°E). In 2017, the school had an enrolment of 1,788 students with 156 teachers (144 full-time equivalent) and 98 non-teaching staff (71 full-time equivalent).

St Michael's College is a Catholic secondary (7–12) school for boys and girls at Jondique Avenue (28.0443°S 153.3650°E). In 2017, the school had an enrolment of 929 students with 71 teachers (67 full-time equivalent) and 39 non-teaching staff (29 full-time equivalent).

The Japanese Language Supplementary School of Queensland Japanese School of Gold Coast (ゴールドコースト校 Gōrudo Kōsuto Kō), a weekend Japanese school, holds its classes at All Saints. It maintains its school office in Surfers Paradise.

There is no government secondary school in Merrimac. The nearest are Merrimac State High School in Mermaid Waters and Robina State High School in Robina.
