= Highland Park, Queensland =

Highland Park Gold Coast, Queensland
- Coordinates: 28.0144°S 153.3344°E
- Population: 6,576 (2021 census)
  - Density: 1,686/km^{2} (4,370/sq mi)
- Postcode(s): 4211
- Area: 3.9 km^{2} (1.5 sq mi)
- Time zone: AEST (UTC+10:00)
- Location: 5.5 km (3 mi) S of Nerang; 11.9 km (7 mi) SW of Surfers Paradise; 12.8 km (8 mi) SW of Southport; 74.5 km (46 mi) SSE of Brisbane
- LGA(s): City of Gold Coast
- State electorate(s): Gaven
- Federal division(s): Moncrieff
Suburbs around Highland Park:
Nerang	Nerang	Nerang
Gilston	Highland Park	Carrara
Gilston	Worongary	Carrara

Highland Park is a suburb in the City of Gold Coast, Queensland, Australia. In the 2021 census, Highland Park had a population of 6,576 people.

== History ==
William Duncan State School opened on 27 January 1987. It was officially opened on 31 October 1987 by Ivan Gibbs, the Member of the Queensland Legislative Assembly for Albert. The school is named after William Duncan, an early settler and timber-getter in the district. There had been an earlier proposal to call the school Boorajing (an Aboriginal word meaning windy place).

- Spencers Seafood located on Hinkler Drive was founded by Michael Spencer, winner of 2024 hospitality award.

== Demographics ==
In the 2011 census, Highland Park recorded a population of 6,561 people, 51% female and 49% male. The median age of the Highland Park population was 39 years, 2 years above the national median of 37. 66.3% of people living in Highland Park were born in Australia. The other top responses for country of birth were New Zealand 10.3%, England 5.7%, Philippines 0.7%, South Africa 0.7%, Japan 0.7%. 86.4% of people spoke only English at home; the next most common languages were 0.9% Japanese, 0.7% Croatian, 0.6% Spanish, 0.5% German, 0.4% Italian.

In the 2016 census, Highland Park had a population of 6,574 people.

In the 2021 census, Highland Park had a population of 6,576 people.

== Education ==
William Duncan State School is a government primary (Prep-6) school for boys and girls at 114-136 Alexander Drive (28.0127°S 153.3343°E). In 2018, the school had an enrolment of 597 students with 45 teachers (41 full-time equivalent) and 30 non-teaching staff (19 full-time equivalent). It includes a special education program and a positive learning centre.

There is no secondary school in Highland Park. The nearest government secondary school is Nerang State High School in neighbouring Nerang to the north.
