= Benowa, Queensland =

Benowa
- Suburb
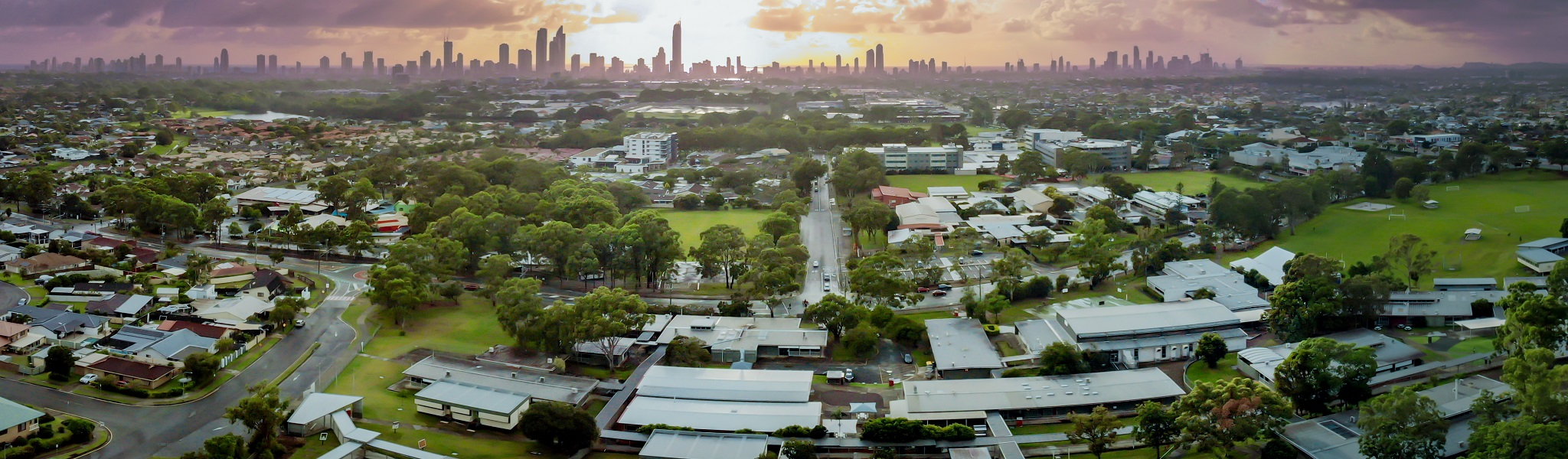
- Benowa State High School (foreground) looking east towards Surfers Paradise, 2021

- Interactive map of Benowa
- Coordinates: 28.0083°S 153.3872°E
- Country: Australia
- State: Queensland
- City: Gold Coast
- LGA: City of Gold Coast
- Location: 3.8 km (2.4 mi) SW of Surfers Paradise; 5.7 km (3.5 mi) SSW of Southport; 75.3 km (46.8 mi) SSE of Brisbane

Government
  - State electorates: Surfers Paradise; Southport
  - Federal division: Moncrieff

Area
  - Total: 6.6 km^{2} (2.5 sq mi)

Population
  - Total: 9,889 (2021 census)
  - Density: 1,498/km^{2} (3,881/sq mi)
- Time zone: UTC+10:00 (AEST)
- Postcode: 4217
Suburbs around Benowa
Ashmore	Ashmore	Southport
Carrara	Benowa	Bundall
Carrara	Broadbeach Waters	Bundall

Benowa is a suburb in the City of Gold Coast, Queensland, Australia. In the 2021 census, Benowa had a population of 9,889 people.

== Geography ==
Benowa is located 3 kilometres (1.9 mi) west of Surfers Paradise.

There are 2 distinct areas to Benowa. Established Benowa located on the northern side of Ashmore Road, and Benowa Waters. Benowa is attracting a fair amount of attention from renovators with some of the original homes being built around the 1890s but have since been replaced with newer homes, due to its great proximity to Surfers Paradise, and Broadbeach and with so many great facilities within the area. Benowa is renowned for its canals with easy access to the Nerang River.

== History ==
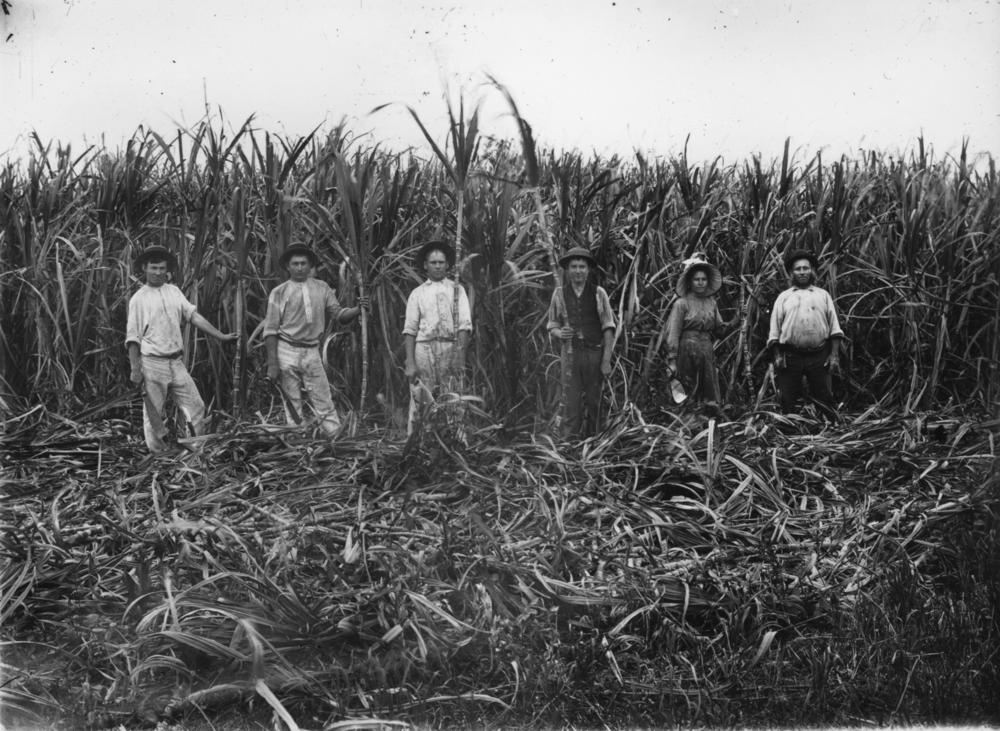
Canecutters working in the cane fields in the Benowa area, ca. 1910

The name was originally derived from the Bundjalung word "Boonow", meaning bloodwood tree. This word was later corrupted by European settlers in search of sugar cane growing on the shores of the Nerang River. The name was perpetuated in 1870 when a pioneer named Robert Muir used the name for his sugar plantation on the northern bank of the river.

The Bundall Provisional School opened on 21 September 1885 on the corner of Ashmore Road and Mediterranean Drive under head teacher Edwin Davies. In November 1900 it was renamed Benowa Provisional School. On 1 January 1909, it was relocated the corner of Ashmore Road and Carrara St and became Benowa State School. In 1965 it was relocated to its present site at Benowa Road. The school celebrated its 125th birthday in 2010.

In October 1887, 5 subdivisions comprising the Benowa Estate and Plantation on the Nerang River were advertised to be auctioned by James R. Dickson. A map advertising the auction states the Estate was located 4 miles to Southport bound by a good road on one side and bound by the navigable Nerang River on the other side. Extensive buildings and plant for sugar manufacturing were included on the Estate.

St Kevin's Catholic School opened on 30 January 1979 with principal Elizabeth Newlands and 49 students enrolled in Years 1 and 2. The planning for the school was commenced by under the Vincentian Fathers of Southport Parish. On 11 March 1979 it was officially opened and blessed by Archbishop Francis Rush.

Benowa State High School opened on 29 January 1980.

== Demographics ==
In the 2011 census, Benowa had a population of 7,979.

In the 2016 census, Benowa had a population of 8,741 people. The population was 52.6% female and 47.4% male. The median age of the Benowa population was 43 years, 5 years above the national median of 38. 59.0% of people were born in Australia. The next most common countries of birth were New Zealand 6.0%, England 4.7%, China 3.1%, Japan 1.7% and South Africa 1.5%. 70.2% of people only spoke English at home. Other languages spoken at home included Mandarin 4.8%, Japanese 2.5%, Cantonese 1.6% and Korean 1.4%. The most common responses for religion were No Religion 28.2%, Catholic 22.9% and Anglican 17.3%.

In the 2021 census, Benowa had a population of 9,889 people.

== Heritage listings ==
There are a number of heritage-listed sites in Benowa, including:

- 173 Ashmore Road: former Benowa Post Office
- 234 Ashmore Road: Rosser's house and gardens

== Education ==
Benowa State School is a government primary (Early Childhood to Year 6) school for boys and girls at 314–358 Benowa Road (28.0077°S 153.3911°E). In 2018, the school had an enrolment of 892 students with 65 teachers (59 full-time equivalent) and 40 non-teaching staff (24 full-time equivalent). It includes a special education program. School sports include Australian rules football, touch football, netball, hockey, and soccer.

St Kevin's Catholic School is a Catholic primary (Preparatory to Year 6) school for boys and girls at 312 Benowa Road (28.0037°S 153.3907°E). In 2018, the school had an enrolment of 522 students with 37 teachers (31 full-time equivalent) and 21 non-teaching staff (12 full-time equivalent).

Benowa State High School is a government secondary (7–12) school for boys and girls at Mediterranean Drive (28.0047°S 153.3885°E). In 2018, the school had an enrolment of 1894 students with 149 teachers (139 full-time equivalent) and 60 non-teaching staff (47 full-time equivalent). It includes a special education program. Benowa State High School is known for its French immersion course, which started in 1980.

== Amenities ==
The Gold Coast City Council operates a fortnightly mobile library service which visits St Kevins Avenue.

There are a number of parks in the suburb, including:

- Annies Court Parklands (28.0232°S 153.3899°E)
- Apex Park (benowa) (27.9992°S 153.3905°E)
- Ayrshire Avenue Reserve (28.0098°S 153.4002°E)
- Benowa Flood Channel (28.0025°S 153.3987°E)
- Benowa Park (28.0016°S 153.3879°E)
- Bruce Park (28.0261°S 153.3955°E)
- Canara Street Parklands (27.9971°S 153.3934°E)
- Carcoola Street Reserve (27.9984°S 153.3890°E)
- Gold Coast Regional Botanic Garden – Rosser Park (28.0088°S 153.3834°E)
- Gold Market Dr Reserve 1 (28.0019°S 153.4006°E)
- Kelly Park (28.0160°S 153.3876°E)
- Lunar Court Park (28.0000°S 153.3923°E)
- Mediterranean Drive Parklands (28.0044°S 153.3874°E)
- Racecourse Drive Paklands (28.0061°S 153.4013°E)
- Robert Park (28.0218°S 153.3902°E)
- Scenic Park (28.0001°S 153.3968°E)
- Sir Bruce Small Park (28.0070°S 153.3961°E)
- William Park (28.0180°S 153.3902°E)

== Sport ==
Benowa is home to several sports clubs. The Surfers Paradise Australian Football Club are based at Sir Bruce Small Park and compete in the South East Queensland Australian Football League Division 1. The club also plays Cricket in the off season. The Surfers Paradise Baseball Club also play at Sir Bruce Small Park. The Benowa Bowls Club are based at Sir Bruce Small Park also.

The Royal Pines Resort is home to professional Golf tournaments such as the Australian PGA Championship and the Australian Ladies Masters. The resort also used to host a professional Tennis event named the Mondial Australian Women's Hardcourts on the WTA Tour. The event was moved to Brisbane in 2009. The Tennis facilities are still used by the Australian Fed Cup team to host Fed Cup ties and Bernard Tomic often trains on the courts in the off season.

== Notable people ==
- Cameron McEvoy, swimmer
