= Rivermount College =

College in Yatala, Australia

Location
- Yatala, Queensland; Australia; 27°45′06″S 153°12′03″E

Information
- Motto: Perseverance, integrity, excellence
- Established: 1992; 34 years ago
- Founder: Colin Young
- Principal: Erik Hofsink
- Years offered: Early learning to Year 12
- Campus type: Outer urban
- Website: www.rivermount.net

Rivermount College is a non-denominational, co-educational, Christian, combined, school, situated in Yatala, Queensland, Australia. It is administered by Independent Schools Queensland, with an enrolment of 960 students and a teaching staff of 70, as of 2023. The school serves students from Prep through to Year 12.

== History ==
The school opened on 1 January 1992.

In 2017, the students beat the world record of doing the Nutbush dance with 522 dancers, from the previous record of 254 dancers in 2015.
