= Queensland Independent College =

Private school in Gold Coast, Queensland, Australia

Coordinates: 28°02′58.48″S 153°22′03.48″E

Queensland Independent College was a private, primary school in Merrimac, Gold Coast, Australia. It was founded in 2008 as the Queensland Montessori College, with a view to creating a sustainable school to replace a previous Montessori school that had closed down. The first intake of students occurred at the start of 2009. The school closed down in June 2017, most of the students were migrated to Silkwood (school) at the beginning of the second term of the 2017 school year.

The school was coeducational, non-denominational and emphasised specialised educational attention in a relaxed, supportive environment. It originally focused on the Montessori method of education, a child-centric method of teaching that focused on independence, self-discipline and thinking skills, with light external control of the children. As the curriculum evolved it sought the same aims by including Dewey's progressive education, integrated curriculum, Kolb's VAK & experiential learning, Gardner's Multiple Intelligences and Harvard University's Teaching for Understanding, in order to "incorporate the positive aspects of each to fully engage all learners at all times." Prior to closing, the school covered Montessori cycles 1 to 3 (Prep to Year 7: up to age 12).
