= Benowa State High School =

Location
- Mediterranean Drive; Benowa, Queensland, 4217; Australia; 28.0057°S 153.3888°E

Information
- Type: State secondary day school
- Motto: Many Pathways – No Limits
- Established: 1980; 46 years ago
- Authority: Department of Education (Queensland)
- Principal: Alison Fahlbusch
- Deputy Principals: Anthony Larkin (years 7/8); Cameron Murray (years 9/10); Lieve Rimbaut (years 11/12); Brendon Wolski
- Business Manager: Michelle Black
- Year levels: Year 7 – Year 12
- Gender: Coeducational
- Enrolment: 2,129 (August 2025)
- Colours: Red; Grey; White; Black
- Teams: Benowa Redbacks (volley ball)
- Website: benowashs.eq.edu.au

Benowa State High School (BSHS) is a state, co-educational school in the suburb of Benowa (Queensland, Australia) in the Gold Coast. The school is located in the land of the Kombumerri people, within the wider Bujalung language nation, recognising Ngarahngwal and Yugambeh. It is the only state high school in the state electorate of Surfers Paradise.

It hosts exchange students from Asia, America, Africa and Europe. It started a French Immersion program in 1985 and was the first school to offer Marine Biology as a subject in the Queensland curriculum.

== Academic ==
The school's French Immersion programme is a four-year course offered in Years 7 to 10, where students are taught four of their six subjects in French: these being mathematics, French, society & environment and science. The school has recorded 11 OP1s (Overall Position) each year from 2004 to 2007, which ranks it ahead of all other secondary schools in the Gold Coast region. Another stream in Benowa SHS is the Steiner education Programme which aims to develop independent and "natural" learning in students, who learn at their own pace.

The STEM program at Benowa aims for students to excel in the areas of science, technology, engineering and mathematics. It is a four-year program from Years 7–10. Each and every STEM student receives extra lessons in those categories and various opportunities including 3D printing, Rocket Launching, Coding, and more.

Benowa is known for having a large range of subjects. It has over 30 subjects which students can choose in Years 10, 11 and 12. Unlike most state schools, but like some private schools, Benowa State High School groups year 10–12 as senior school, and offers Specialist Mathematics as a subject to the year 10 students.

== Sports ==
Benowa is a constant achiever at volleyball tournaments, placing highly in most of the competitions they enter, and some students have entered the national level of competition in the event. Students also achieve high in many other sports, including tennis, swimming, athletics and touch. The school also has an athletics-inclined stream called "Sports Excellence", which is aimed at Year 7, 8 and 9 students who wish to pursue a career in athletics. It has produced athletes who have gone on to represent both state and country in a variety of sports such as: swimming, volleyball, rugby, Australian rules football, football and track & field.

== Arts ==
Benowa has created an innovative curriculum in the arts which includes visual art, music, dance, drama and music. Art workshops are offered to complement formal classes.

The school is included within the Gold Coast Branch of the "Modern Language Teachers Association of Queensland".

== Students ==
=== Year levels ===
In 2015, Queensland secondary schools started catering for Year 7 to align Queensland with the other states, as part of the official implementation of Anna Bligh's state-wide "Flying Start" program. 2014 was the last year Benowa State High School catered only for Year 8 to Year 12. Since 2015, the year levels currently offered at this school are Year 7 to Year 12.

=== Student enrolments ===
In 2023, Benowa State High School was reported to have a maximum student enrolment capacity of 2,456 students.

The trend in school enrolments (August figures) has been:

Student enrolment trends
Year	Year levels						Gender		Total	Ref
Year	7	8	9	10	11	12	Boys	Girls	Total	Ref
2010	-	-	-	-	-	-	819	914	1,733	
2011	-	-	-	-	-	-	895	952	1,847	
2012	-	-	-	-	-	-	945	997	1,942	
2013	-	-	-	-	-	-	957	1,001	1,958	
2014	-	-	-	-	-	-	914	979	1,893	
2015	-	-	-	-	-	-	984	1,032	2,016	
2016	-	-	-	-	-	-	932	1,000	1,932	
2017	-	-	-	-	-	-	880	1,015	1,895	
2018	405	352	364	262	232	288	869	1,024	1,893	
2019	361	396	344	340	261	187	858	1,031	1,889	
2020	379	359	393	315	315	217	905	1,073	1,978	
2021	340	367	349	343	293	291	916	1,067	1,983	
2022	357	340	377	312	334	269	927	1,062	1,989	
2023	355	348	337	337	313	280	953	1,017	1,970	
2024	394	357	360	318	343	266	1,000	1,038	2,038	
2025	405	397	371	341	306	309	1,016	1,113	2,129	
2026	TBA	TBA	TBA	TBA	TBA	TBA	TBA	TBA	TBA	

== Sports ==
=== Volleyball ===
The school's volley ball team is called the "Benowa Redbacks".

=== House structure ===
Benowa State High School has eight different school houses. Students can gain house points for their house during sporting events, as well as showing behaviour that aligns with the school's four core values (respect, compassion, integrity and diligence). Between 2018 and 2022, the school operated under a "vertical" roll mark structure based around the houses, however, in 2023 the school reverted back to a "horizontal" structure. With the change of system, the heads of house were renamed "house coordinators".

The eight houses, named after Australian pioneers are:

Current house system in Benowa SHS
House name	Colour	Mascot	House coordinator	Australian based pioneer
Bandler	Red	Dragon	Andy Taylor	Faith Bandler- Indigenous and civil rights activist
Florey	Purple	Phoenix	Curtis Allnut	Howard Florey- Nobel Prize winning pharmacologist involved in the development of penicillin
Hinkler	Pink	Flamingo	Katy MacGibbon	Herbert Hinkler- Aviator and inventor, first to fly solo from England to Australia and across the Southern Atlantic Ocean
Hollows	Orange	Owl	Alex McBroom	Fred Hollows- Ophthalmologist and humanitarian involved in restoring thousands of Australian's eyesight
Laver	Blue	Lion	Jane Brown	Rod Laver- Tennis player
Murdoch	Green	Minotaur	Nanette Richert	Elisabeth Murdoch- Philanthropist
Wake	Aqua	Wolverine	Imogen Klan	Nancy Wake- Nurse, journalist, special operations executive and intelligence officer for the French in WWII
Wright	Yellow	Griffin	Mike Redfern	Judith Wright- Award winning poet, environmentalist and Indigenous land rights activist

Before 2018, the original 4 homesteads (Carnarvon, Lindemann, Moreton and Girraween) had a system in which siblings were in the same homestead. This is no longer the case.

== Notable alumni ==
The following are notable alumni of the school:

=== Entertainment ===
Notable alumni in entertainment
Name	Area	Ref.
Peter Andre	Singer	
Jamie Durie	TV presenter and landscape designer	
Anna Torv	Actress	
Hannah Palmer	Walkey award-winning journalist and radio producer	
Eamon Farren	Actor	

=== Sport ===
Notable alumni in sport
Name	Sport	Achievement
Daniel Merrett	Australian rules football	Brisbane Lions player
Brent Renouf	Australian rules football	Hawthorn Football Club (Port Adelaide) player
Dayne Zorko	Australian rules football	Brisbane Lions captain

== See also ==
- Education in Queensland
- History of state education in Queensland
- List of schools in Gold Coast, Queensland
- List of schools in Queensland
- Lists of schools in Australia
