= Nerang State High School =

Public school in Queensland, Australia

Location
- 1-35 Weedons Road; Nerang, Queensland, 4211; Australia; 28.00091°S 153.327223°E

Information
- Type: State secondary day school
- Motto: Seek within, strive beyond
- Established: 1986
- Principal: Hollie Robb
- Deputy Principals: Suzy Riley (Years 7 & 8); Kerry Wharton (Years 9 & 10); Shane Courtenay (Years 11 & 12)
- Year levels: Year 7 – Year 12
- Gender: Coeducational
- Enrolment: 998 (August 2025)
- Average class size: 21 (Year 7 - 10); 16 (Year 11 - 12)
- Colours: Maroon; Navy blue; White
- Website: nerangshs.eq.edu.au

Nerang State High School (NSHS) is a public, co-educational, secondary school, located in the Gold Coast town of Nerang (Queensland, Australia). The school is administered by the Department of Education and is located in Division 5 of the City of Gold Coast local government area.

== History ==
The school opened on 28 January 1986.

In 2021, Nerang State High School had 484 solar panels installed and up-and-running. This $310,000 investment was part of Queensland's "Advancing Clean Energy Schools" (ACES) program that was completed in 2022, which saw a total of 200,000 solar PV panels installed on rooftops at 912 schools across that state.

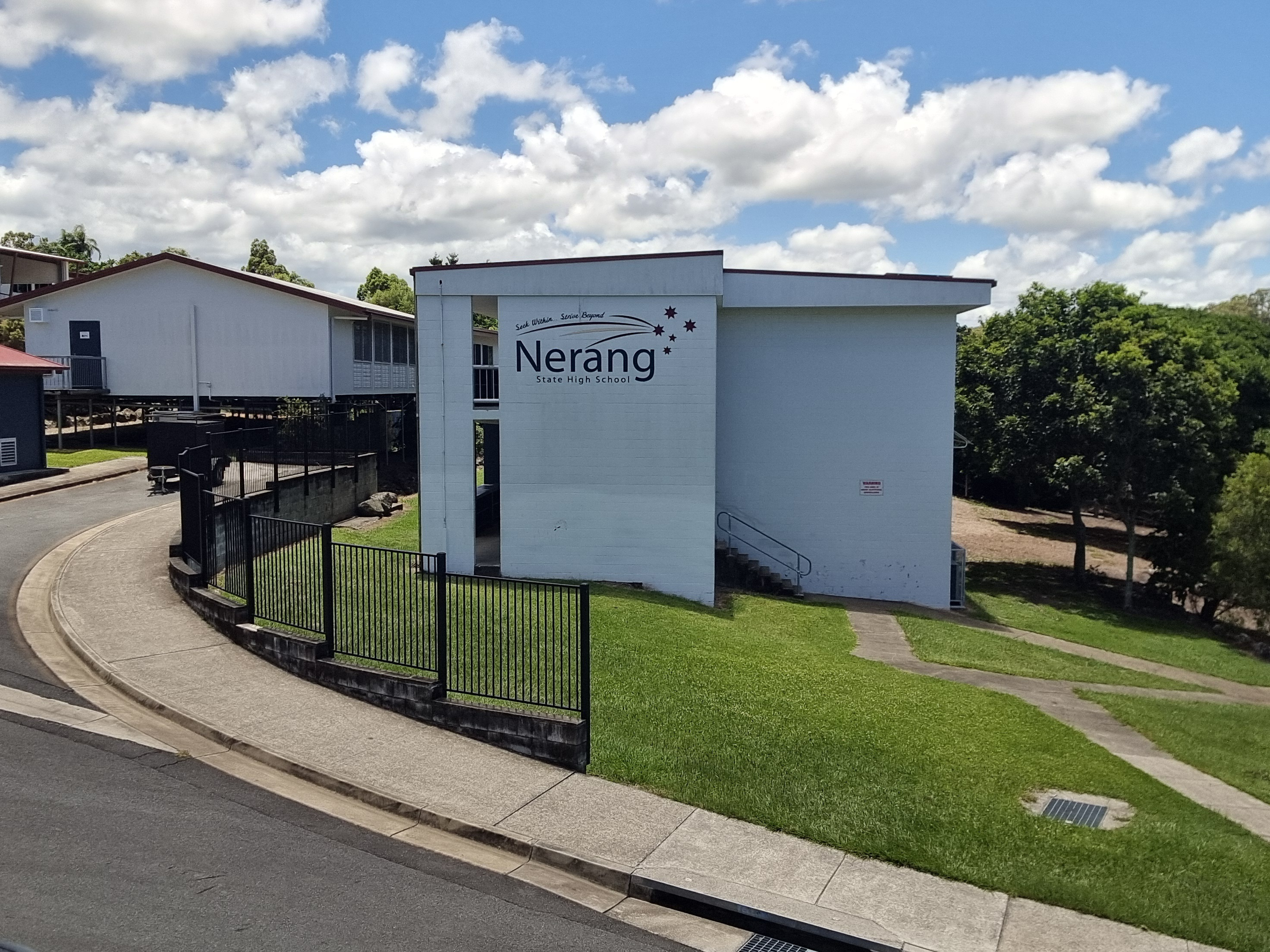
The science block of Nerang State High School in 2026.

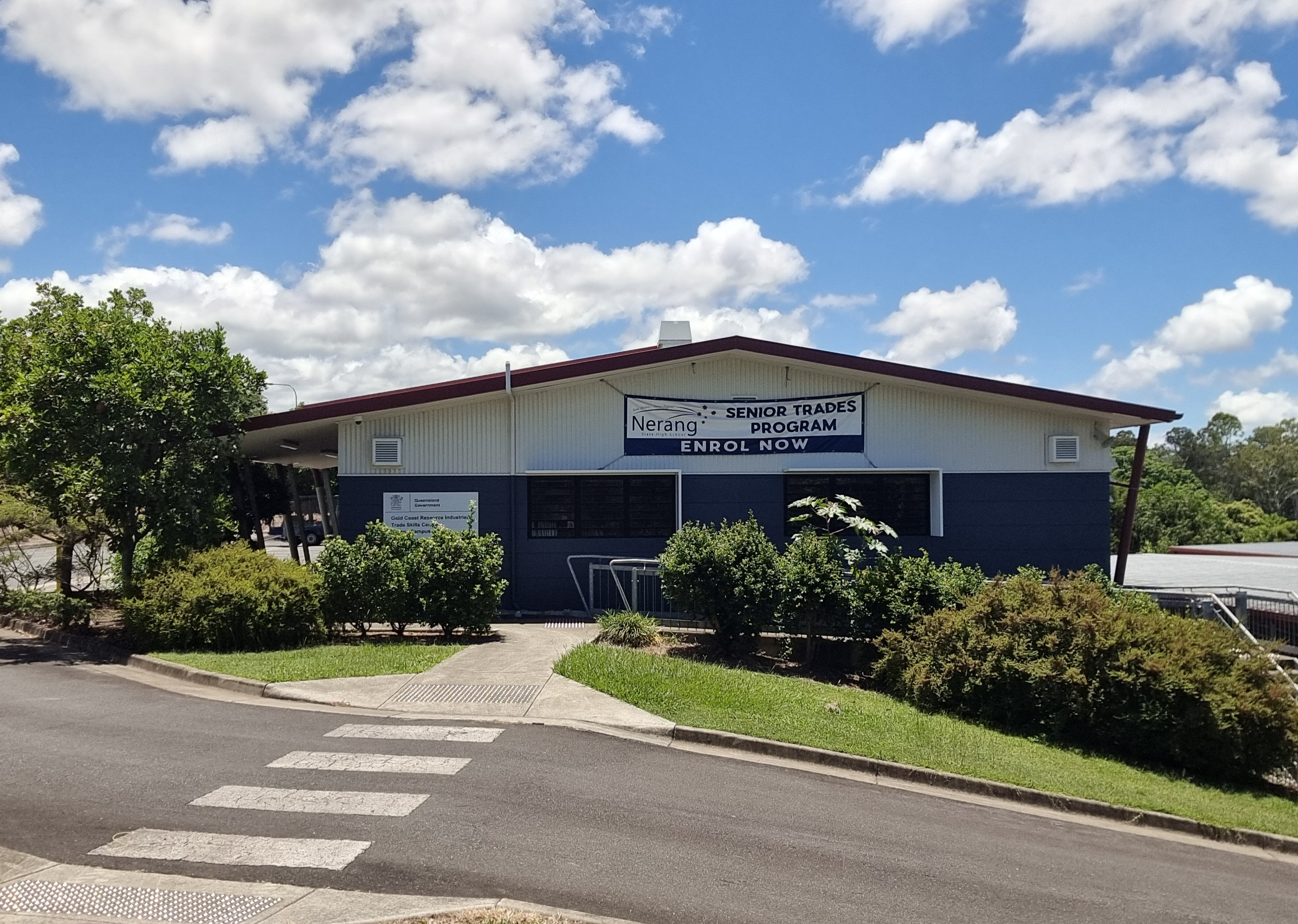
Nerang State High School's Trade Centre in 2026.

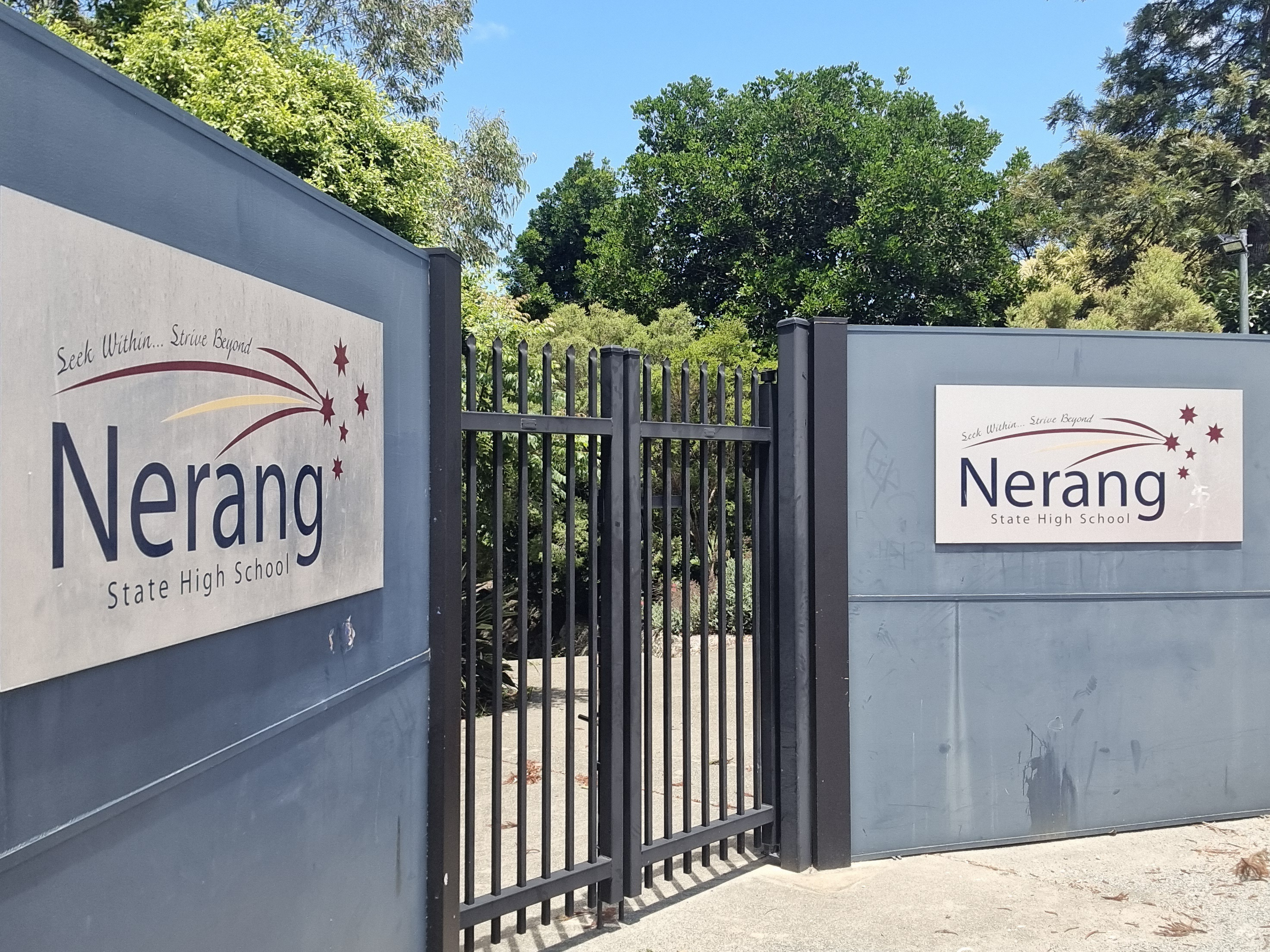
The front entrance of Nerang State High School, 2026.

== Demographics ==
=== Student enrolments ===
As of 2024, the school has a teaching staff of 89 and a non-teaching staff of 45, serving students from Year 7 to Year 12.

In 2023, Nerang State High School was reported to have a maximum student enrolment capacity of 1,295 students, with 1,008 students enrolled. The trend in school enrolments (August figures) has been:

Student enrolment trends
Year	Years						Boys	Girls	Total	Ref
Year	7	8	9	10	11	12	Boys	Girls	Total	Ref
2014	-	-	-	-	-	-	435	442	877	
2015	-	-	-	-	-	-	477	514	991	
2016	-	-	-	-	-	-	482	508	990	
2017	-	-	-	-	-	-	507	530	1,037	
2018	197	210	209	175	112	123	512	514	1,026	
2019	230	202	213	204	156	92	561	536	1,097	
2020	218	229	195	212	180	126	593	567	1,160	
2021	198	210	199	188	171	152	587	531	1,118	
2022	205	186	199	190	158	138	572	504	1,076	
2023	194	189	184	182	145	134	581	447	1,028	
2024	174	210	178	170	147	129	505	458	1,008	
2025	TBA	TBA	TBA	TBA	TBA	TBA	544	454	998	
2026	TBA	TBA	TBA	TBA	TBA	TBA	TBA	TBA	TBA	

== Sports ==
=== Houses ===
The school's five sports houses are named after the initial four letters of the Greek alphabet:

Sports Houses
House Name	Colour	Surnames	Ref
Alpha	Blue	A-D	
Beta	Gold	E - K	
Gamma	Red	L - R	
Delta	Green	S - Z	

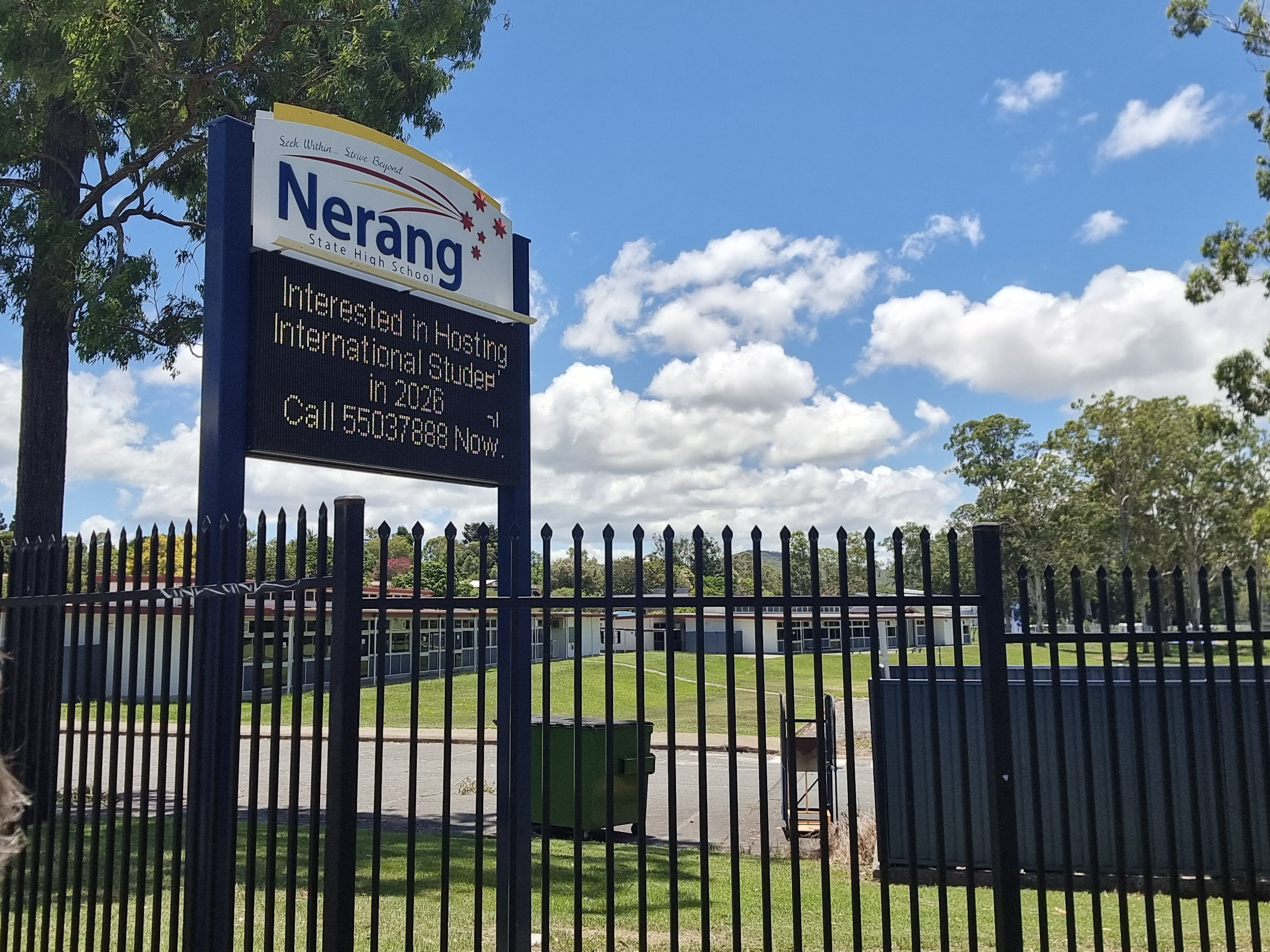
Nerang State High School - Sports Oval, 2026.

== Notable alumni ==
Notable alumni in sport
Name	Sport	Achievements	Ref
Shelley Cronau	Wheelchair Basketball	Paralympic athlete at the 2020 Summer Paralympics in Tokyo	

== See also ==
- List of schools in the Gold Coast
- List of schools in Queensland
- Lists of schools in Australia
