= List of Gold Coast suburbs =

Suburbs and localities in the City of Gold Coast
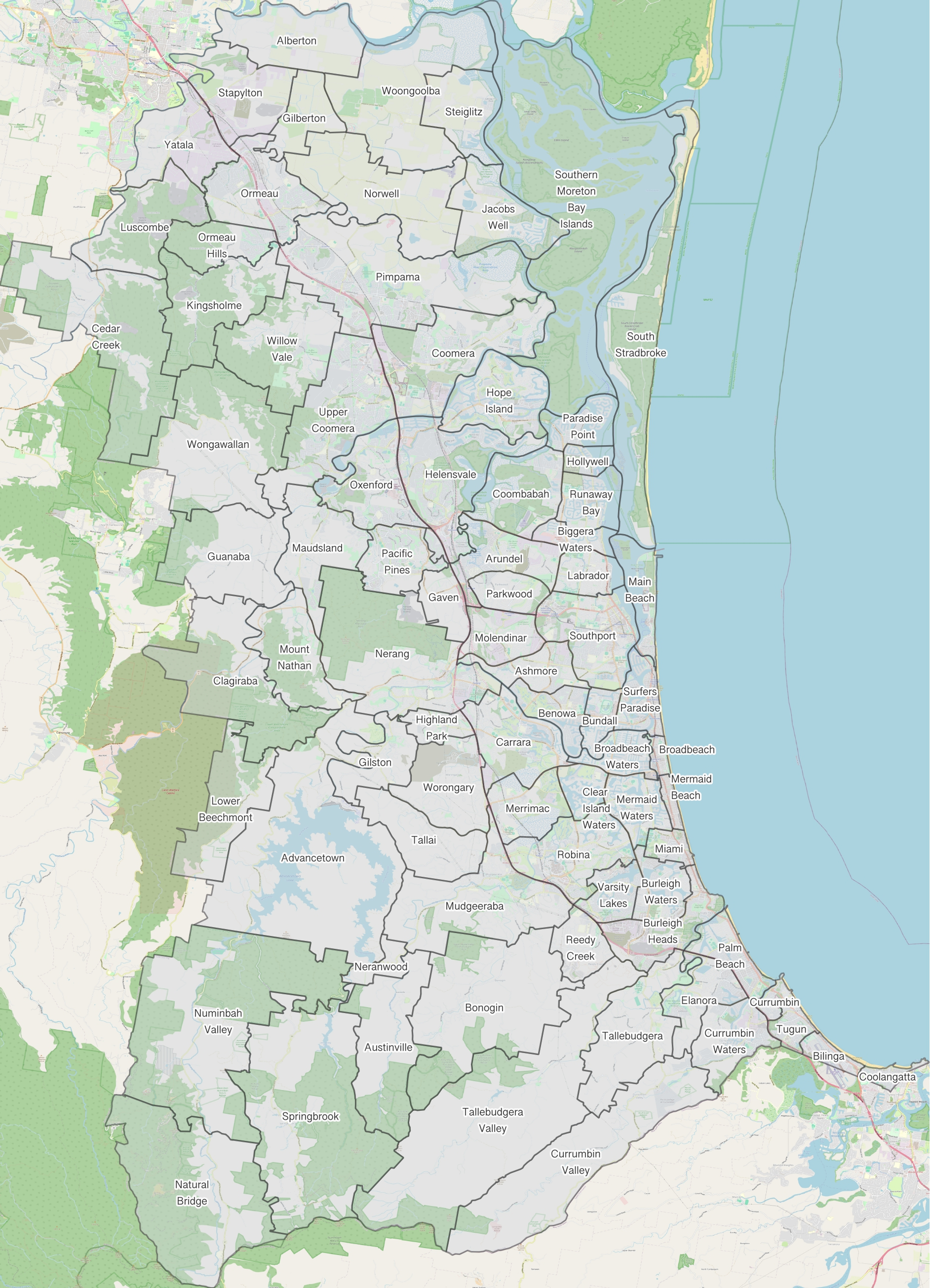
- Map of the suburbs and localities of the City of Gold Coast
- Location: City of Gold Coast
- Number: 52 suburbs 29 localities
- Populations: 0 (Southern Moreton Bay Islands) – 36,786 (Southport)
- Areas: 1.4 km^{2} (Broadbeach) – 83.9 km^{2} (Southern Moreton Bay Islands)
- Subdivisions: Neighbourhoods

The City of Gold Coast is a local government area (LGA) in the Australian state of Queensland, that is divided into 81 suburbs and localities. According to a 2024 estimate by the Australian Bureau of Statistics (ABS), the City of Gold Coast had a population of 681,389 people. It is the second-largest LGA in Australia by population, behind the City of Brisbane. The ABS-defined Gold Coast–Tweed Heads significant urban area (SUA) had a population of 750,997 people, and is the sixth-largest SUA in Australia. It is also the largest SUA in the country that is not a state or territory capital. The Gold Coast has a diverse economy, with construction being its largest industry by output, generating $19 billion for the local economy in 2024. In the same year, the city’s gross regional product was estimated at $49.46 billion, accounting for 9.5% of Queensland’s total economy.

The LGA was established in 1948 as the Town of South Coast, following the amalgamation of several local government areas: the Town of Southport, the Town of Coolangatta, and part of the Shire of Nerang. Immediately to the north, the remainder of the Shire of Nerang, along with the Shires of Coomera and Beenleigh and parts of the Shires of Tingalpa and Waterford, were combined to form the Shire of Albert. The LGA was renamed the Town of Gold Coast in 1958, and the following year, it became known as City of Gold Coast. Following a recommendation by the Electoral and Administrative Review Commission, the Shire of Albert was absorbed into the City of Gold Coast in 1995, partially to resolve water supply rights disputes between the two councils. In 2008, a section centered on the suburb of Beenleigh was transferred to Logan City to unify the area north of the Albert River.

The area is gazetted into 52 suburbs (urban areas) and 29 localities (rural areas); they stretch from the Queensland state border to the south to the Albert River to the north, and from the Coral Sea to the east to the Gold Coast hinterland and Scenic Rim to the west. The largest division is the Southern Moreton Bay Islands locality (83.9 km^{2}); it is also the only unpopulated division. The smallest division is the suburb of Broadbeach (1.4 km^{2}) and the largest division by population is Southport (36,786 people).

== Suburbs and localities ==
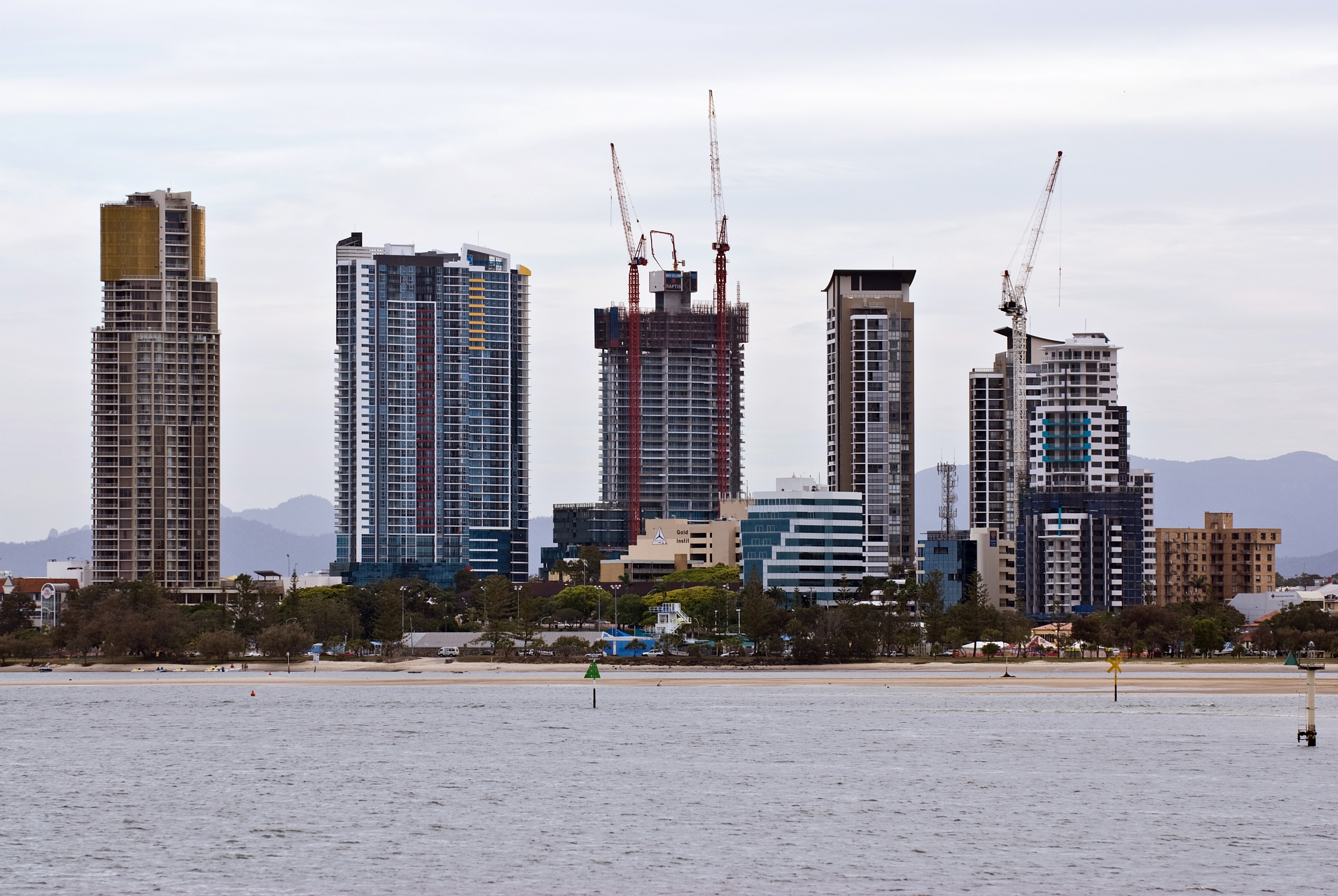
Southport is the city's largest suburb by population, with 36,786 residents.

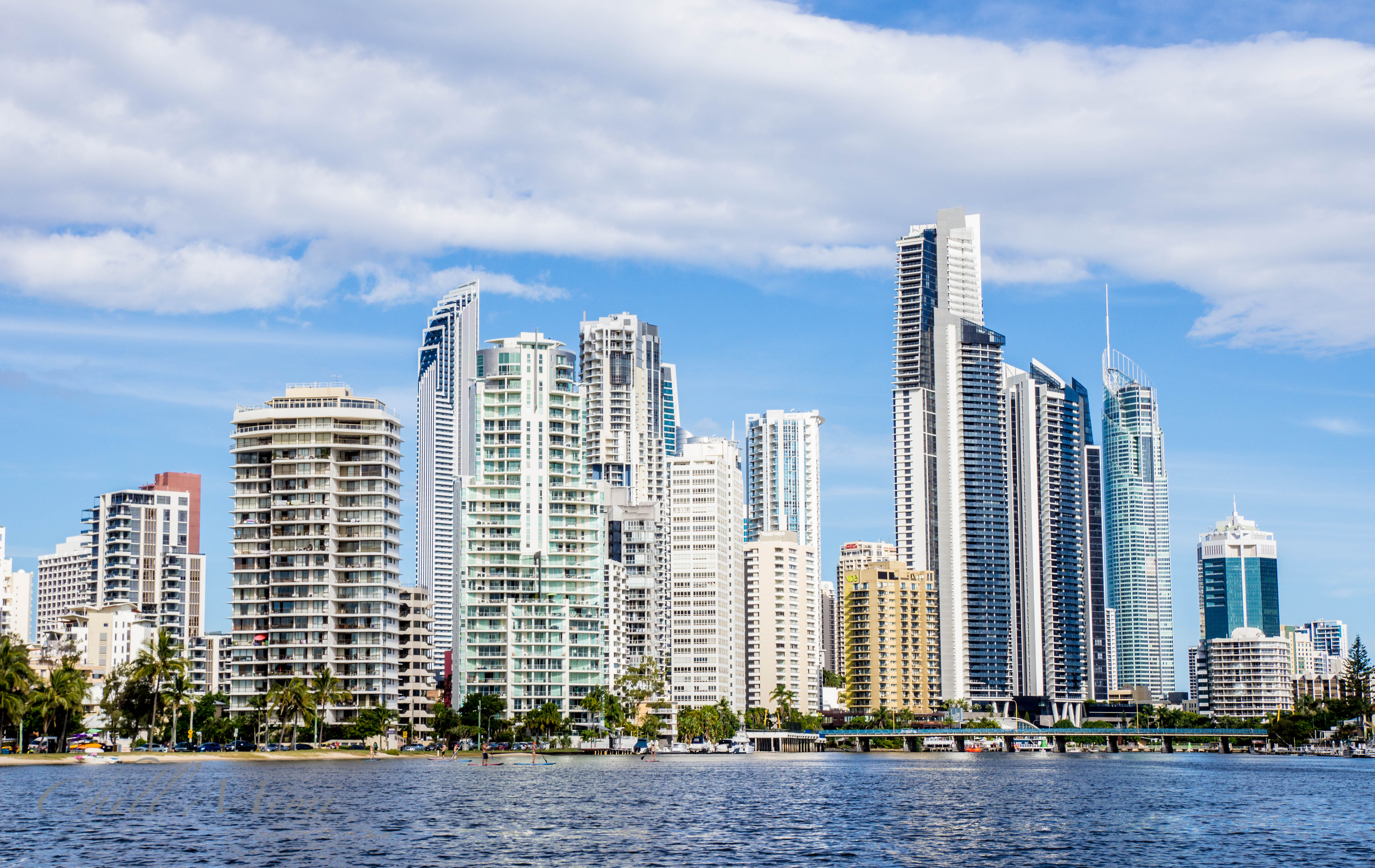
Surfers Paradise is the third largest suburb by population.

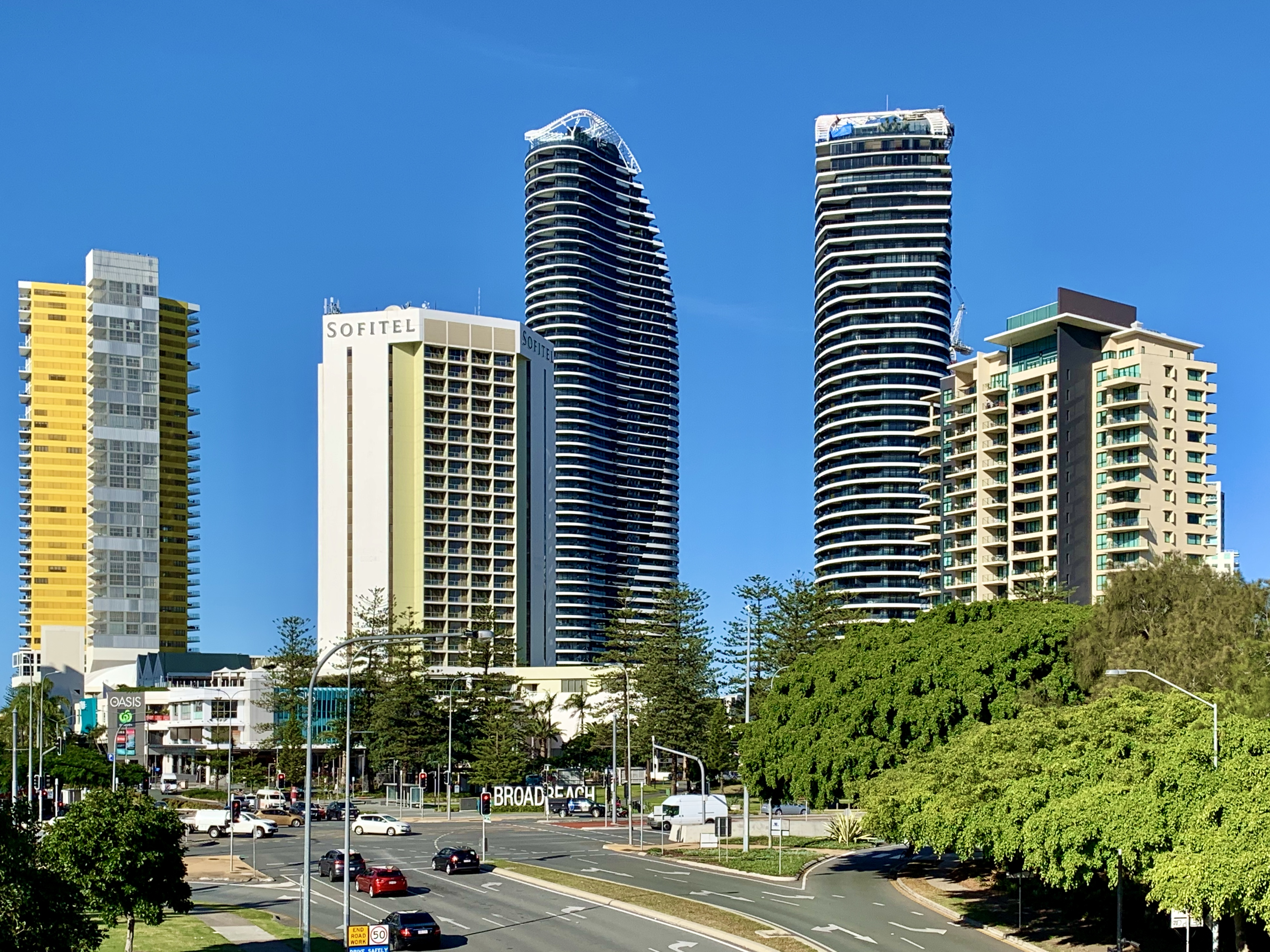
Broadbeach is the smallest suburb by area.

List of suburbs and localities in the City of Gold Coast
Name	Type	Postcode	Census population			Area	
Name	Type	Postcode	2016	2021	Change	km^{2}	sq mi
Advancetown	Locality	4211	482	528	+9.5%	63.6	24.6
Alberton	Locality	4207	590	547	−7.3%	17.0	6.6
Arundel	Suburb	4214	10,246	11,171	+9.0%	10.3	4.0
Ashmore	Suburb	4214	11,910	12,415	+4.2%	6.8	2.6
Austinville	Locality	4213	356	403	+13.2%	21.3	8.2
Benowa	Suburb	4217	8,741	9,889	+13.1%	6.6	2.5
Biggera Waters	Suburb	4216	8,534	9,973	+16.9%	3.7	1.4
Bilinga	Suburb	4225	1,804	1,883	+4.4%	2.6	1.0
Bonogin	Locality	4213	4,573	4,896	+7.1%	38.7	14.9
Broadbeach	Suburb	4218	5,514	6,786	+23.1%	1.4	0.54
Broadbeach Waters	Suburb	4218	7,779	8,164	+4.9%	5.3	2.0
Bundall	Suburb	4217	4,523	4,895	+8.2%	3.9	1.5
Burleigh Heads	Suburb	4220 (Note: The neighbourhood of West Burleigh, located within the suburb of Burleigh Heads, uses the postcode 4219 for post office boxes.)	9,188	10,077	+9.7%	10.2	3.9
Burleigh Waters	Suburb	4220	14,310	14,556	+1.7%	6.7	2.6
Carrara	Suburb	4211	12,060	13,138	+8.9%	13.9	5.4
Cedar Creek (Note: Cedar Creek is split between both the City of Gold Coast and the City of Logan; population statistics include both government areas, whereas the area data only includes the Gold Coast section.)	Locality	4207	838	861	+2.7%	25.9	10.0
Clagiraba	Locality	4211	601	651	+8.3%	27.8	10.7
Clear Island Waters	Suburb	4226	4,120	4,395	+6.7%	4.3	1.7
Coolangatta	Suburb	4225	5,948	6,491	+9.1%	1.8	0.69
Coombabah	Suburb	4216	10,388	10,298	−0.9%	13.2	5.1
Coomera	Suburb	4209	13,305	20,225	+52.0%	24.6	9.5
Currumbin	Suburb	4223	2,920	3,278	+12.3%	2.0	0.77
Currumbin Valley	Locality	4223	1,849	2,084	+12.7%	35.0	13.5
Currumbin Waters	Suburb	4223	9,121	9,797	+7.4%	9.9	3.8
Elanora	Suburb	4221	12,145	12,539	+3.2%	8.9	3.4
Gaven	Locality	4211	1,558	1,638	+5.1%	6.7	2.6
Gilberton	Locality	4208	25	31	+24.0%	8.0	3.1
Gilston	Locality	4211	2,459	2,669	+8.5%	9.4	3.6
Guanaba	Locality	4210	793	852	+7.4%	22.1	8.5
Helensvale	Suburb	4212	16,862	18,949	+12.4%	21.6	8.3
Highland Park	Suburb	4211	6,574	6,576	0.0%	3.9	1.5
Hollywell	Suburb	4216	2,865	2,930	+2.3%	2.9	1.1
Hope Island	Suburb	4212	11,186	14,522	+29.8%	14.2	5.5
Jacobs Well	Suburb	4208	1,839	2,882	+56.7%	14.2	5.5
Kingsholme	Locality	4208	286	782	+173.4%	20.1	7.8
Labrador	Suburb	4215	18,261	18,643	+2.1%	5.7	2.2
Lower Beechmont	Locality	4211	1,046	1,067	+2.0%	16.5	6.4
Luscombe	Locality	4207	307	265	−13.7%	17.0	6.6
Main Beach	Suburb	4217	3,883	3,998	+3.0%	7.0	2.7
Maudsland	Locality	4210	5,568	8,073	+45.0%	14.5	5.6
Mermaid Beach	Suburb	4218	6,533	7,329	+12.2%	1.5	0.58
Mermaid Waters	Suburb	4218	12,045	13,088	+8.7%	7.1	2.7
Merrimac	Suburb	4226	7,071	7,212	+2.0%	9.0	3.5
Miami	Suburb	4220	6,843	7,445	+8.8%	3.0	1.2
Molendinar	Suburb	4214	6,375	6,450	+1.2%	7.7	3.0
Mount Nathan	Locality	4211	1,214	1,375	+13.3%	14.6	5.6
Mudgeeraba	Suburb	4213	13,624	14,578	+7.0%	25.8	10.0
Natural Bridge	Locality	4211	108	90	−16.7%	42.1	16.3
Nerang	Suburb	4211	16,864	17,048	+1.1%	35.9	13.9
Neranwood	Suburb	4213	67	79	+17.9%	3.2	1.2
Norwell	Locality	4208	200	189	−5.5%	26.1	10.1
Numinbah Valley	Locality	4211	218	212	−2.8%	58.3	22.5
Ormeau	Suburb	4208	14,460	15,938	+10.2%	16.4	6.3
Ormeau Hills	Locality	4208	3,148	4,521	+43.6%	8.5	3.3
Oxenford	Suburb	4210	11,842	12,273	+3.6%	13.9	5.4
Pacific Pines	Suburb	4211	16,757	16,664	−0.6%	9.2	3.6
Palm Beach	Suburb	4221	14,654	16,349	+11.6%	6.3	2.4
Paradise Point	Suburb	4216	6,536	7,062	+8.0%	6.4	2.5
Parkwood	Suburb	4214	8,702	8,837	+1.6%	5.6	2.2
Pimpama	Suburb	4209	9,396	24,601	+161.8%	41.4	16.0
Reedy Creek	Suburb	4227	6,659	7,412	+11.3%	6.4	2.5
Robina	Suburb	4226	23,106	25,659	+11.0%	15.0	5.8
Runaway Bay	Suburb	4216	9,068	9,308	+2.6%	7.4	2.9
South Stradbroke	Locality	4216	41	142	+246.3%	31.3	12.1
Southern Moreton Bay Islands	Locality	—	0	0	—	83.9	32.4
Southport	Suburb	4215	31,908	36,786	+15.3%	15.6	6.0
Springbrook	Locality	4213	659	705	+7.0%	52.7	20.3
Stapylton	Locality	4207	444	430	−3.2%	15.0	5.8
Steiglitz	Locality	4207	705	682	−3.3%	11.4	4.4
Surfers Paradise	Suburb	4217	23,689	26,412	+11.5%	6.2	2.4
Tallai	Suburb	4213	4,150	4,465	+7.6%	13.0	5.0
Tallebudgera	Suburb	4228	3,667	3,826	+4.3%	19.3	7.5
Tallebudgera Valley	Locality	4228	1,624	1,762	+8.5%	60.1	23.2
Tugun	Suburb	4224	6,588	7,175	+8.9%	3.0	1.2
Upper Coomera	Suburb	4209	25,276	27,180	+7.5%	23.8	9.2
Varsity Lakes	Suburb	4227	15,026	16,493	+9.8%	5.9	2.3
Willow Vale	Locality	4209	2,096	2,279	+8.7%	21.5	8.3
Wongawallan	Locality	4210	1,273	1,415	+11.2%	32.9	12.7
Woongoolba	Locality	4207	280	282	+0.7%	32.5	12.5
Worongary	Suburb	4213	5,613	6,021	+7.3%	14.1	5.4
Yatala	Suburb	4207	1,312	1,405	+7.1%	14.0	5.4
