= The Kokoda Challenge =

The Kokoda Challenge is a team endurance event, comprising an up-to 96km bushwalk, which takes place across Queensland, Australia throughout the year.

Participants in teams of four trek an 18, 30, 48, or full 96km cross-country course, predominantly following fire trails, crossing 12 creeks and climbing 5,000m of vertical elevation, within 39 hours. The distance is representative of the actual Kokoda Track, along which elements of the Australian Army fought during the Kokoda Track Campaign of World War 2. The 39-hour time limit is derived from the 39th Battalion, one of the first units which fought during the campaign.

The Kokoda Challenge events exist to raises funds for youth programs run by the Kokoda Youth Foundation. These experiential youth programs help local children reach their full potential through providing access to outdoor adventure, mentorship, community service, and learning the history of the 1942 Kokoda Campaign. Additionally, the Challenge aims to encourage the values of mateship, endurance, courage, and sacrifice, which are associated with all elements which fought during the Kokoda Track Campaign.

Shorter courses occur throughout the year, but the full, 96km course has 13 Major Checkpoints. Starting in the Gold Coast Hinterland suburb of Mudgeeraba, the track follows selected fire trails and paths through Austinville, Springbrook, Numinbah Valley, Lower Beechmont and Clagiraba to the finish line at the Nerang Velodrome.

== Charity ==
The Kokoda Youth Foundation is a registered charity, providing funds for the Kokoda Challenge Youth Program (KCYP), which aims to teach young people the "fundamental philosophy of the Spirit of Kokoda, and how their achievements in life are directly related to the effort they contribute". The program for The Kokoda Kids is a 14-month commitment - the first 20 weeks consisting of training and team building activities to develop physical fitness and prepare them for the challenge of walking the actual Kokoda Track in Papua New Guinea. The KCYP was Established by Doug Henderson and his wife Anna, the initial goal was to raise awareness of the World War II Kokoda Campaign in New Guinea in 1942; and use the 'Spirit of Kokoda' to help young Australian's reach their full potential. The first Youth Program was conducted in June 2005, which trained and supported 12 young people to walk the Kokoda Track that year in Papua New Guinea.

Kokoda Challenge Race Records - PNG Kokoda Trail
Direction	Record holder	Record time	Year
Kokoda to Owers Corner via Naduri	Brendan Buka	17:20	2007
Owers Corner to Kokoda	Brendan Buka	16:34.05	2008
Kokoda to Owers' Corner via Kagi	Ramsy Idau	18:28	2012
