= Austinville, Queensland =

Austinville Gold Coast, Queensland
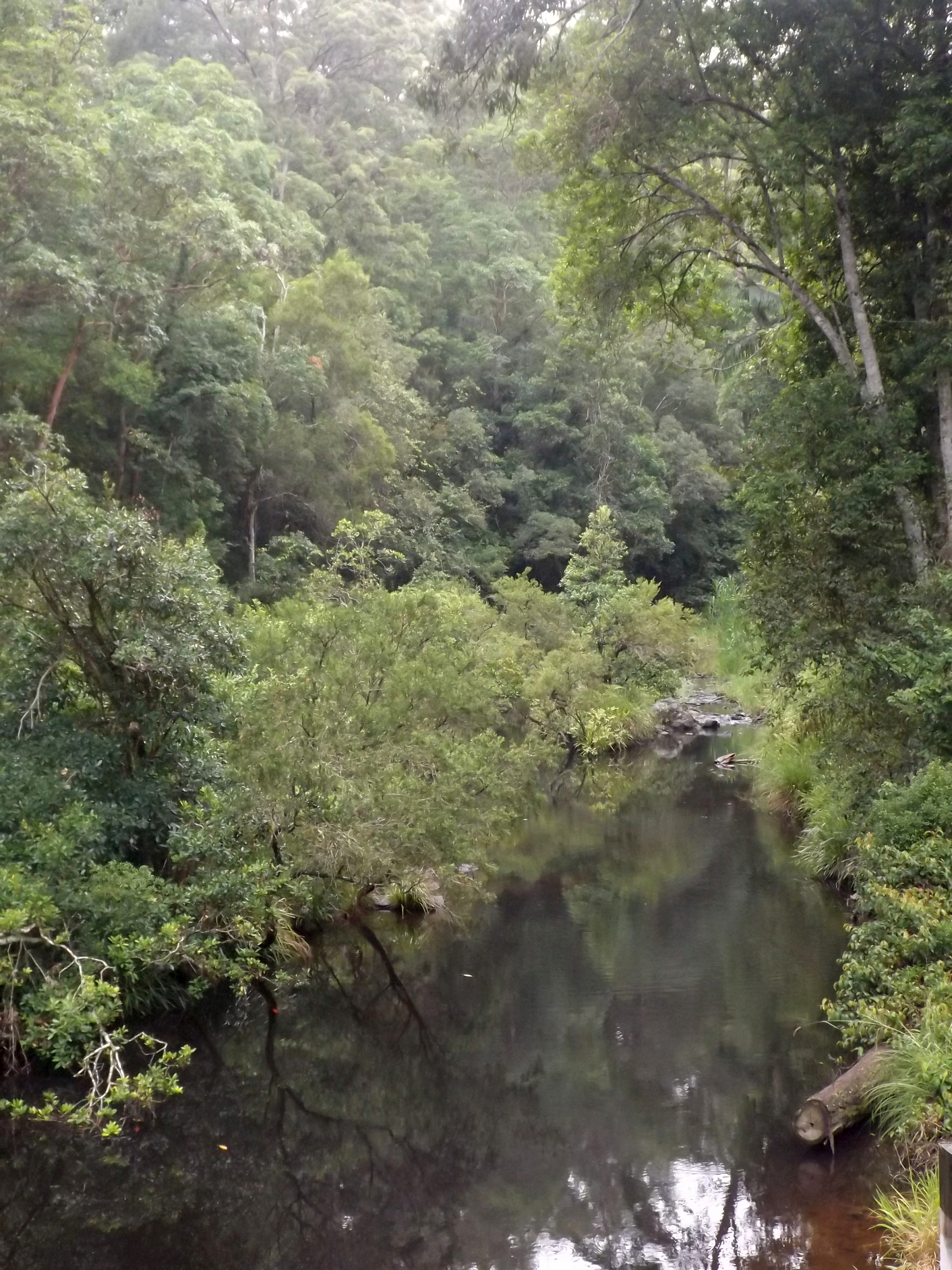
- Mudgeeraba Creek, 2016

- Coordinates: 28.1541°S 153.3099°E
- Population: 403 (2021 census)
  - Density: 18.92/km^{2} (49.00/sq mi)
- Postcode(s): 4213
- Area: 21.3 km^{2} (8.2 sq mi)
- Time zone: AEST (UTC+10:00)
- Location: 10.3 km (6 mi) SW of Mudgeeraba; 14.5 km (9 mi) SW of Robina; 23.8 km (15 mi) SW of Surfers Paradise; 27.7 km (17 mi) SW of Southport; 89.2 km (55 mi) SSE of Brisbane CBD
- LGA(s): City of Gold Coast
- State electorate(s): Mudgeeraba
- Federal division(s): McPherson
Suburbs around Austinville:
Neranwood	Advancetown	Mudgeeraba
Springbrook	Austinville	Bonogin
Springbrook	Springbrook	Tallebudgera Valley

Austinville is a hinterland locality in the City of Gold Coast, Queensland, Australia. In the 2021 census, Austinville had a population of 403 people.

== Geography ==
Austinville is situated in the Gold Coast Hinterland between Mudgeeraba and Springbrook.

Austinville is located in a valley through which flows Mudgeeraba Creek and the rugged Nimmel Range looms in the distance. Significant rainforest exists in the area. Areas in the south are protected within Springbrook National Park. Apart from protected areas, the land use is a mixture of residential and grazing on native vegetation.

== History ==
Austinville settlement was established as a banana plantation in 1934, making it one of the Gold Coast's oldest suburbs. It was started as an attempt to resettle unemployed people on the land following the Great Depression, and therefore lift the economy. It was named after Under-Secretary for Labour and Industry at the time, William Henry Austin, who encouraged the building of many of these plantations throughout the state.

Land was cleared and divided into blocks and approximately 50 small homes were built. Mudgeeraba Creek flowed behind the homes along the valley floor, and the rugged Nimmel Range bordered on the settlement's western side. The settlement was very short lived. By 1939, within just 5 years, most families had left the area. Rainforest has crept back into much of the once banana farming valley, and the area remains dwarfed by the surrounding conservation area.

Austinville State School opened on 25 June 1934. It closed on 9 June 1939.

== Demographics ==
In the 2011 census, Austinville had a population of 361 people.

In the 2016 census, Austinville had a population of 356 people.

In the 2021 census, Austinville had a population of 403 people.

== Education ==
There are no schools in Austinville. The nearest government primary school is Mudgeeraba Creek State School in neighbouring Mudgeeraba to the north-east. The nearest government secondary school is Robina State High School in Robina to the north-east.

== See also ==
- Suburbs of the Gold Coast
