= Tallai =

Tallai can refer to:

- András Tállai, Hungarian politician
- Tallai, Queensland, Australia, a suburb
