= Tallai, Queensland =

Tallai
- Suburb
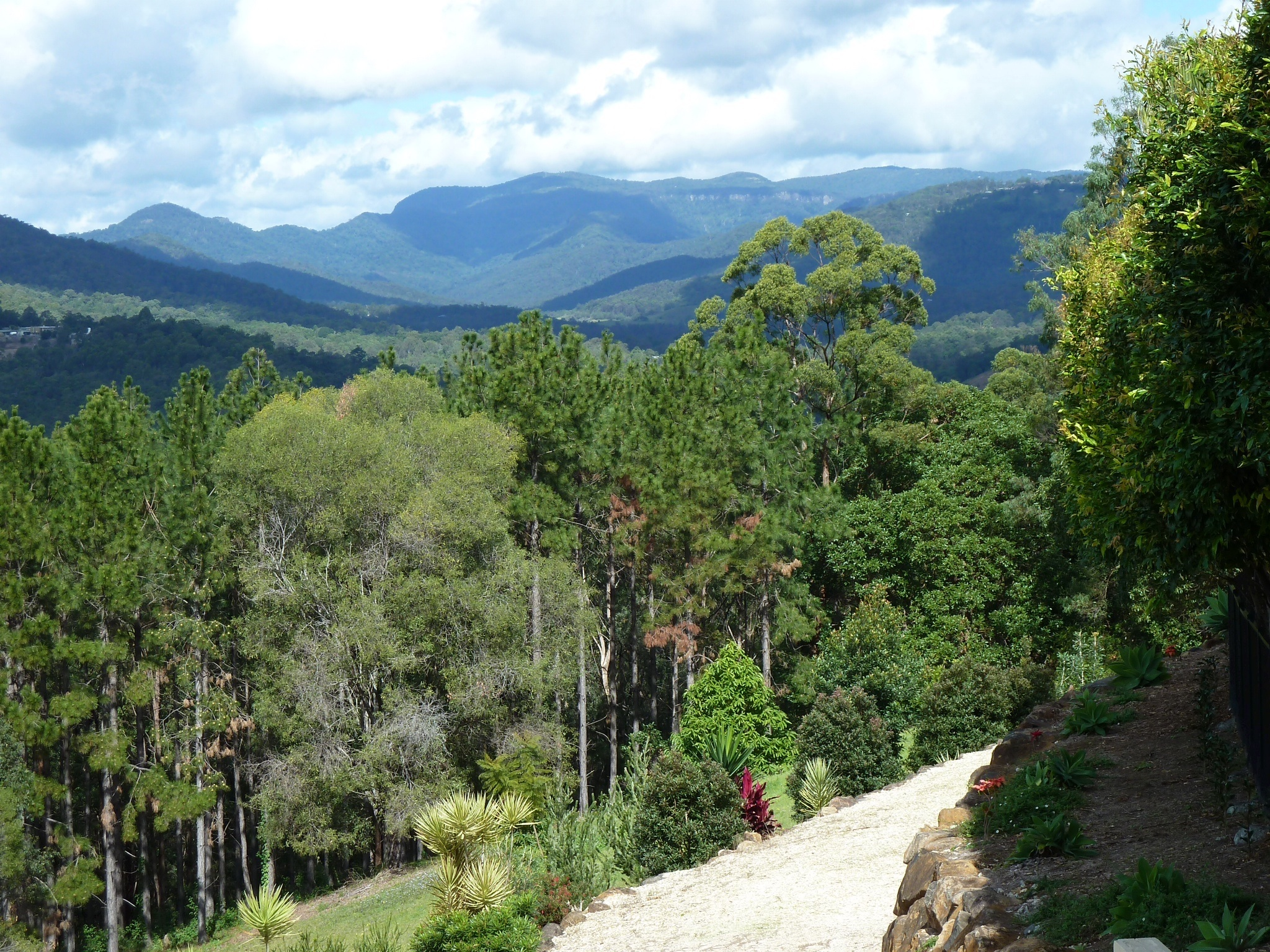
- Looking south from Grandview Road, Tallai, 2013

- Interactive map of Tallai
- Coordinates: 28.0677°S 153.3302°E
- Country: Australia
- State: Queensland
- City: Gold Coast City
- LGA: City of Gold Coast
- Location: 17.5 km (10.9 mi) SW of Surfers Paradise; 20.5 km (12.7 mi) SW of Southport; 82.9 km (51.5 mi) SSE of Brisbane CBD

Government
  - State electorate: Mudgeeraba
  - Federal division: Wright

Area
  - Total: 13.0 km^{2} (5.0 sq mi)

Population
  - Total: 4,465 (2021 census)
  - Density: 343.5/km^{2} (890/sq mi)
- Time zone: UTC+10:00 (AEST)
- Postcode: 4213
Suburbs around Tallai
Gilston	Worongary	Worongary
Advancetown	Tallai	Mudgeeraba
Advancetown	Mudgeeraba	Mudgeeraba

Tallai is a suburb in the City of Gold Coast, Queensland, Australia. In the 2021 census, Tallai had a population of 4,465 people.

== Geography ==
Tallai is situated in the Gold Coast hinterland.

== Demographics ==
In the 2011 census, the population of Tallai was 3,765 people, 51.8% female and 48.2% male. The median age of the Tallai population was 43 years, 6 years above the national median of 37. 65.8% of people living in Tallai were born in Australia. The other top responses for country of birth were England 8.3%, New Zealand 7.2%, South Africa 2.1%, Scotland 1.1%, Germany 0.7%. 86.9% of people spoke only English at home; the next most common languages were 1% German, 0.8% Italian, 0.6% French, 0.6% Japanese, 0.5% Spanish.

In the 2016 census, Tallai had a population of 4,150 people.

In the 2021 census, Tallai had a population of 4,465 people.

== Education ==
There are no schools in Tallai. The nearest government primary schools are Mudgeeraba State School in neighbouring Mudgeeraba to the east, Mudgeeraba Creek State School in neighbouring Mudgeeraba to the south, and Gilston State School in neighbouring Gilston to the north-west. The nearest government secondary schools are Robina State High School in Robina to the east and Nerang State High School in Nerang to the north.

== Amenities ==
Tallai Country Golf Club has a 9-hole golf course at 22 The Panorama (28.0571°S 153.3285°E).

Mudgeeraba Lodge is an aged care facility at 21-25 Old Coach Road (28.0727°S 153.3525°E).

=== Parks ===
There are a number of parks in the area:

- Frank Chaston Sporting Field (28.0409°S 153.3094°E)
- Glenrowan Bush Reserve (28.0631°S 153.3174°E)
- Grandview Terrace Parkland (28.0811°S 153.3273°E)
- Hinze Dam Catchment - Numinbah Forest Reserve (28.0823°S 153.2832°E)
- Imfeld Court Reserve (28.0630°S 153.3384°E)
- Imfeld Court West Reserve (28.0621°S 153.3371°E)
- Ingles Park (28.0771°S 153.3489°E)
- Landlocked Park (28.0716°S 153.3271°E)
- Liquidamber Court (28.0501°S 153.3171°E)
- Michael L Ring Park (28.0796°S 153.3444°E)
- Muller Park (28.0452°S 153.3080°E)
- Otiose Reserve (28.0775°S 153.3422°E)
- Range Road Reserve (28.0764°S 153.3198°E)
- Sid Bigg Park (28.0711°S 153.3520°E)
- Smith Park (28.0677°S 153.3350°E)
- Tallai Rd Reserve (28.0753°S 153.3249°E)
- Tallai Road South Reserve (28.0778°S 153.3263°E)
- Viscount Road Reserves (28.0713°S 153.3387°E)
