= Neranwood, Queensland =

Neranwood City of Gold Coast, Queensland
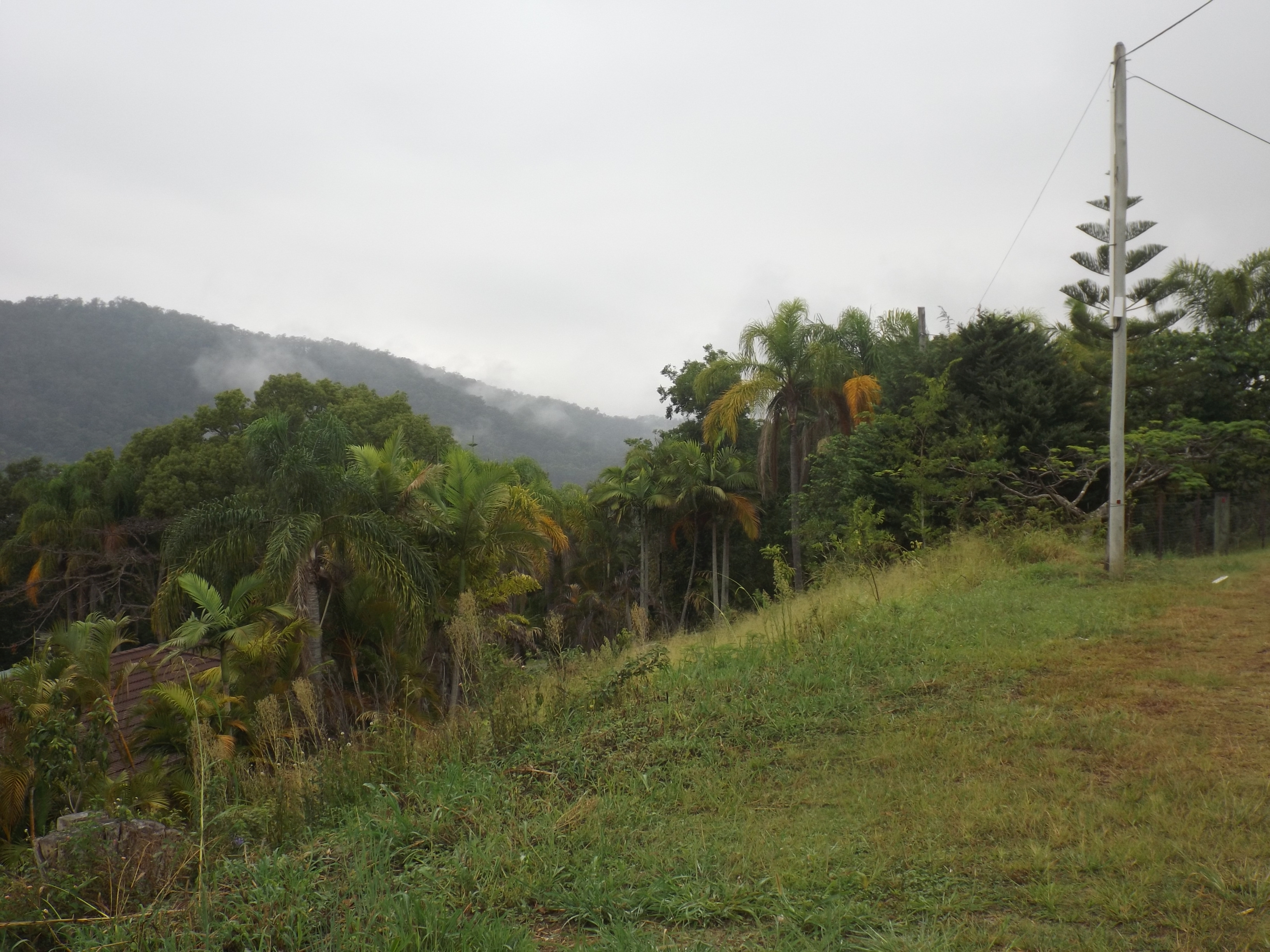
- Lowry Court, 2016

- Coordinates: 28.1172°S 153.3119°E
- Population: 79 (2021 census)
  - Density: 24.7/km^{2} (63.9/sq mi)
- Postcode(s): 4213
- Area: 3.2 km^{2} (1.2 sq mi)
- Time zone: AEST (UTC+10:00)
- Location: 12.4 km (8 mi) SW of Robina; 21.3 km (13 mi) SSW of Surfers Paradise; 24.7 km (15 mi) SSW of Southport; 87.5 km (54 mi) SSE of Brisbane
- LGA(s): City of Gold Coast
- State electorate(s): Mudgeeraba
- Federal division(s): Wright
Suburbs around Neranwood:
Numinbah Valley	Advancetown	Mudgeeraba
Numinbah Valley	Neranwood	Austinville
Springbrook	Austinville	Austinville

Neranwood is a suburb in the City of Gold Coast, Queensland, Australia. In the 2021 census, Neranwood had a population of 79 people.

== History ==
The name Neranwood is a contraction of the name of the Nerang Hardwood Company which established a sawmill in the area in 1923.

Neranwood Provisional School opened on 15 June 1925 and closed on 31 December 1928.

A private tramway was built to transport the timber from the sawmill to the railway siding at Mudgeeraba. It had two locomotives called Alison and Kathleen. However, the project was not economically viable and the sawmill and tramway closed in 1928. Local people used the tramway sleepers for firewood.

A telephone and telegraph office was established in 1924.

== Demographics ==
In the 2016 census, Neranwood had a population of 67 people.

In the 2021 census, Neranwood had a population of 79 people.

== Education ==
There are no schools in Neranwood. The nearest government primary school is Mudgeeraba Creek State School in neighbouring Mudgeeraba to the north-east. The nearest government secondary school is Robina State High School in Robina to the north-east.

== Amenities ==
There are a number of parks in the area:

- Little Nerang Dam (28.1513°S 153.2869°E)
- Neranwood Park (28.1250°S 153.2926°E)
- Numinbah Reserve (28.1269°S 153.3028°E)
- Waterworks Reserve Austinville (28.1211°S 153.3072°E)

== See also ==
- List of tramways in Queensland
