= Mudgeeraba, Queensland =

Mudgeeraba
- Town
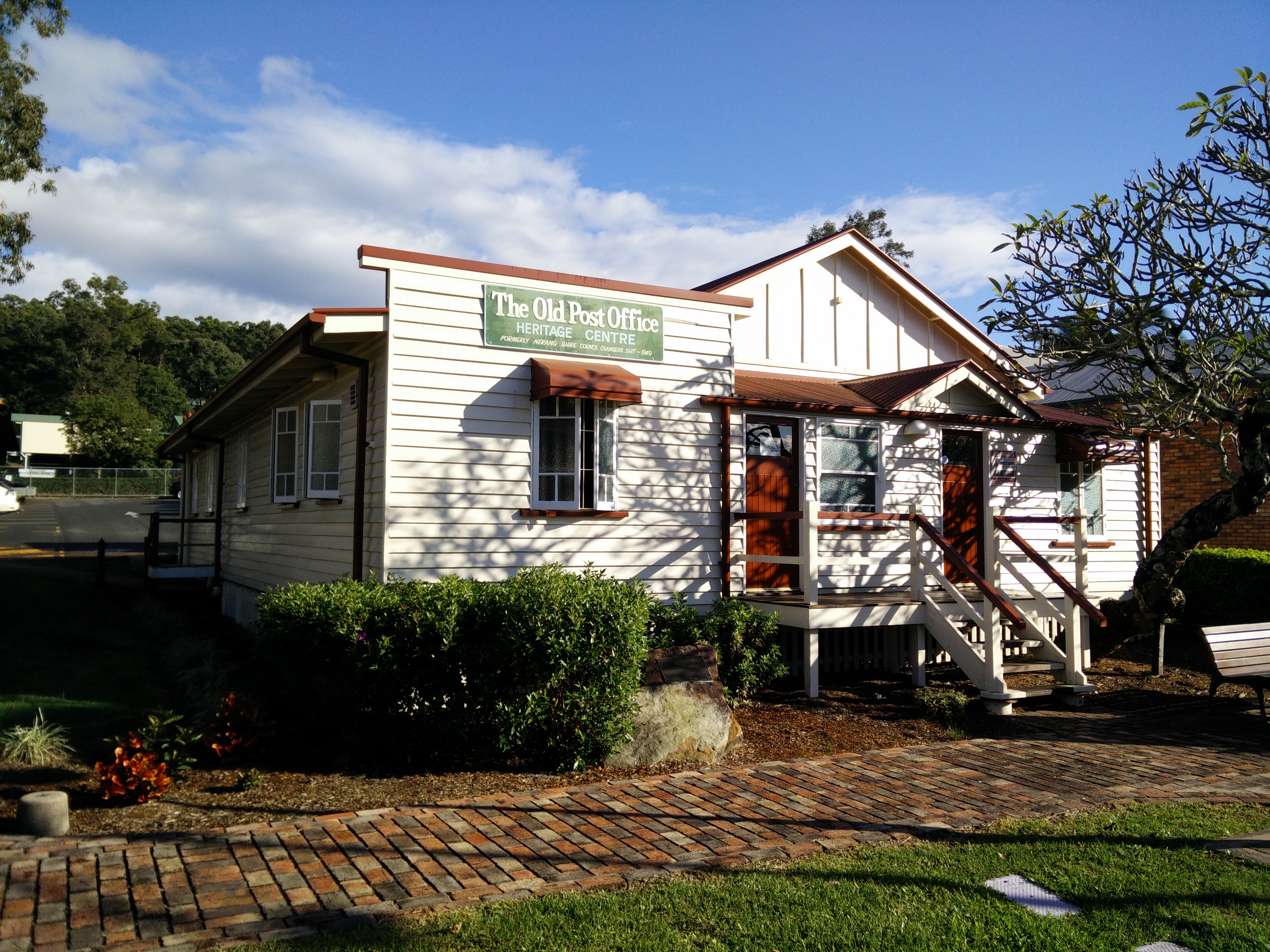
- Old Post Office, 2015

- Interactive map of Mudgeeraba
- Coordinates: 28.0791°S 153.3536°E
- Country: Australia
- State: Queensland
- City: Gold Coast
- LGA: City of Gold Coast
- Location: 14.3 km (8.9 mi) SSW of Surfers Paradise; 19.2 km (11.9 mi) SSW of Southport; 81.2 km (50.5 mi) SSE of Brisbane CBD

Government
  - State electorate: Mudgeeraba
  - Federal divisions: McPherson; Wright

Area
  - Total: 25.8 km^{2} (10.0 sq mi)

Population
  - Total: 14,578 (2021 census)
  - Density: 565.0/km^{2} (1,463.4/sq mi)
- Time zone: UTC+10:00 (AEST)
- Postcode: 4213
Localities around Mudgeeraba
Tallai	Worongary; Merrimac	Robina
Advancetown	Mudgeeraba	Varsity Lakes
Neranwood; Austinville	Bonogin	Reedy Creek

Mudgeeraba (/ˈmʌdʒərəbɑː/ MUH-jə-rə-bah) is a town and suburb in the City of Gold Coast, Queensland, Australia. In the 2021 census, the suburb of Mudgeeraba had a population of 14,578 people. Mudgeeraba's essential character remains one of a nineteenth-century village.

== Geography ==
Mudgeeraba Creek is the major creek of a catchment area in the southern region of the Gold Coast. It is part of the larger catchment area of Nerang River. Bonogin and Wyangan Creeks are tributaries of Mudgeeraba Creek.

Mudgeeraba's essential character remains one of a nineteenth-century village, and contains important evidence of its earlier form and building. Most older houses are situated on large blocks of 0.5 acres (0.20 ha) to 2 acres (0.81 ha), alongside much larger farming properties situated in the area.

== History ==
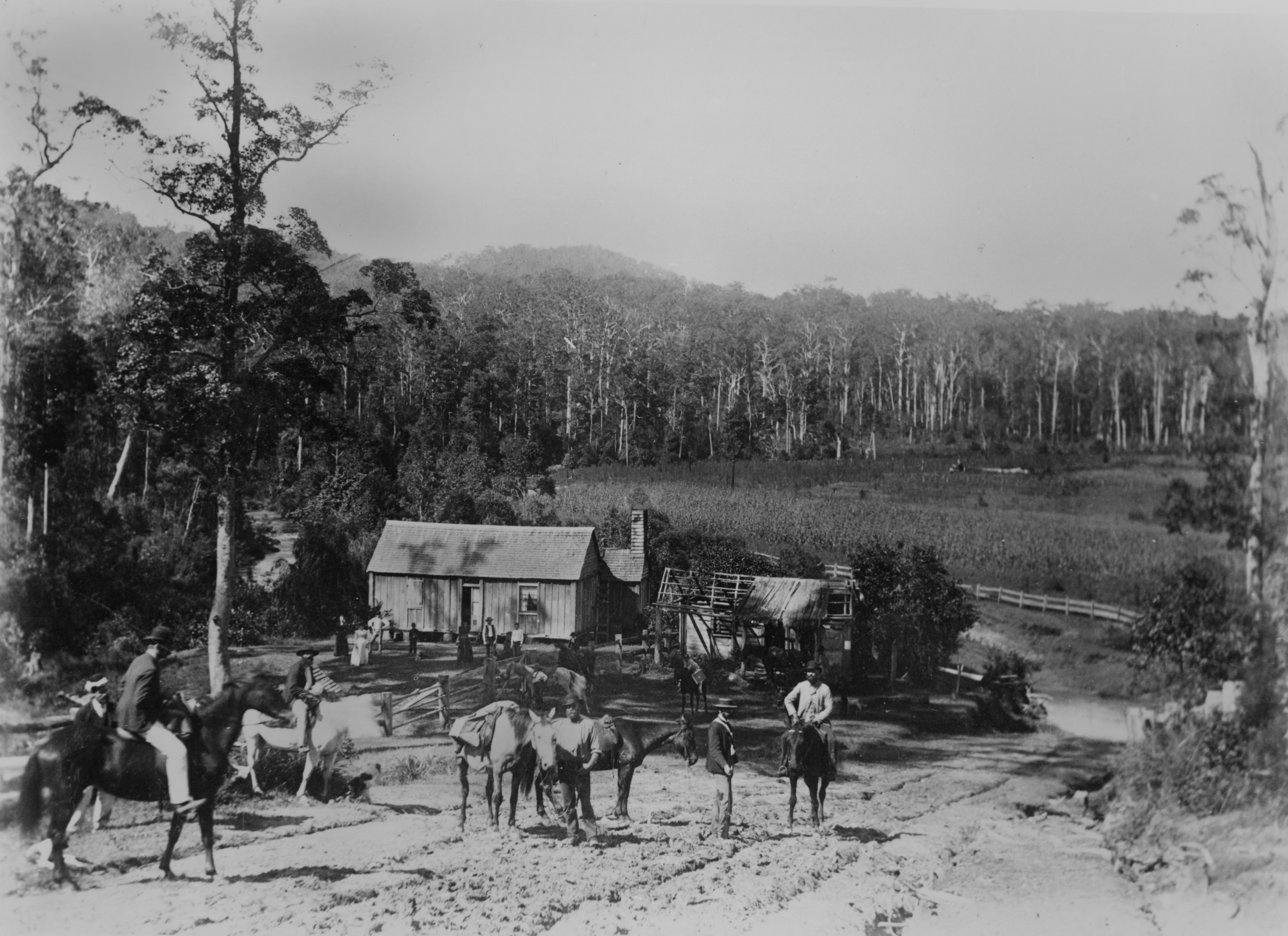
View of a farm in the Mudgeeraba district ca. 1891

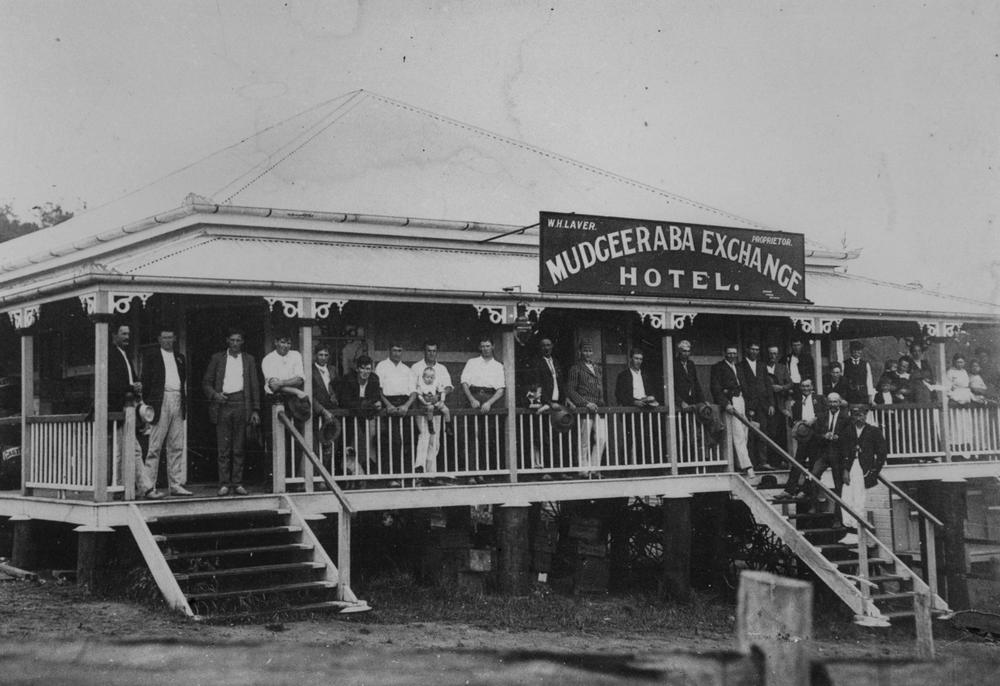
Mudgeeraba Exchange Hotel, 1915

It is thought that the name of the town was derived from an Indigenous Australian expression meaning, "place of infant's excrement", "place where someone told lies" or "place of sticky soil". Another theory is that the name means "low-lying ground".

Mudgeeraba is remnant of the type of township that characterises the rural hinterland of the Gold Coast. Subdivision of land was conventional and buildings were traditionally rural or rural commercial. The Schmidt Farmhouse is typical of farms of that period in the district (the farmhouse is now in the adjacent suburb of Worongary).

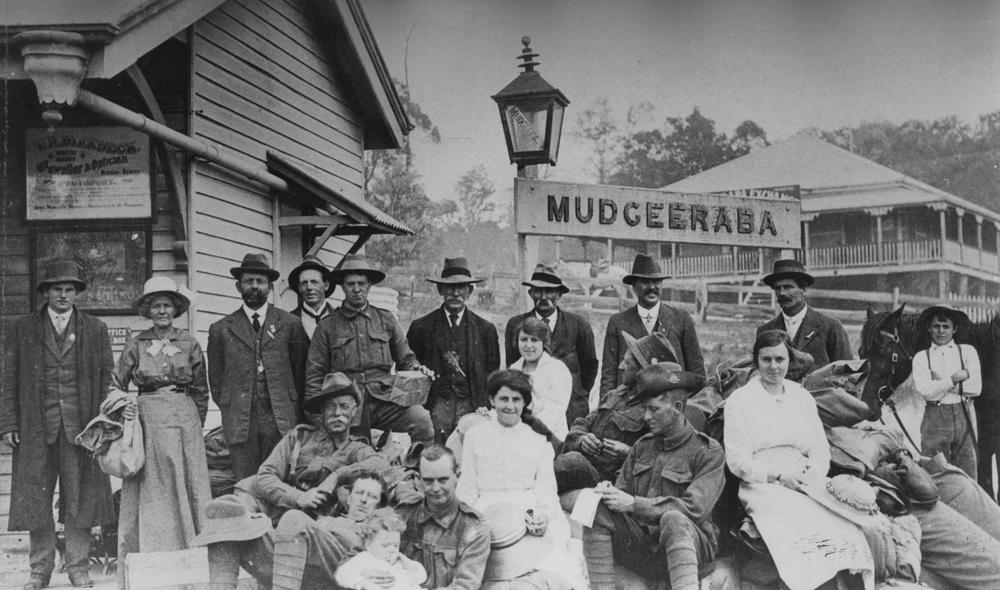
People posing at the railway station in Mudgeeraba, ca. 1917

Mudgeeraba, like other areas in the region, was an early centre for farming, timber getting and cattle grazing by the mid-1870s.

Mudgeraba Provisional School opened on 24 October 1887. On 1 January 1909, it became Mudgeraba State School. In 1915 it was renamed Mudgeraba Upper State School. By 1925 the spelling had changed to Mudgeeraba Upper State School. It closed on 6 November 1955.

Mudgeraba Lower Provisional School opened on 31 March 1892. In 1914, it became Mudgeraba Lower State School. In 1915 it was renamed Mudgeraba State School. By 1925, the spelling had changed to Mudgeeraba State School. It was on the south-east corner of School Street and Cobai Drive (28.07799°S 153.36322°E). In 1981, the school relocated to its current site.

Mudgeeraba rose to some prominence with the coming of the railway from Brisbane to Tweed Heads in 1903. The station of the South Coast railway line was located near the present-day motorway entrance. In 1890, the Queensland State Government indicated that the railway station would be positioned as close to the township, located on Coach Road, as possible. Following the decision was made to position the railway station at some distance to the town, early residents acquired land nearby. Once the railway line was in operation the centre of the town was relocated to its present position. The railway was closed in 1961. The modern day Pacific Motorway largely follows the route of the former railway. The new Gold Coast railway opened on a different alignment from Brisbane to neighbouring Robina in 1998. Robina station is about 1.8 kilometres (1.1 mi) further than the old Mudgeeraba railway station.

In the early 1930s during the Great Depression, the Upper Mudgeeraba Creek banks were the location of unemployment relief camps set up under the Income (Unemployment Relief) Tax Acts, 1930. The creek water helped sustain vegetable gardens for the residents, housed in timber and corrugated iron huts. One aspect of the relief scheme put in place by the Queensland Government was to establish small banana plantations. In Upper Mudgeeraba, 300 acres (120 ha) divided into 50 blocks were made available to successful applicants to farm.

Mudgeeraba Opportunity School opened on 1 January 1981 on the former site of the Mudgeeraba State School. In 1985, the opportunity school relocated to its current site and is now known as Mudgeeraba Special School.

Somerset College opened in 1983.

Mudgeeraba Creek State School opened on 29 January 1996.

Following the closure of All Saints' Anglican Church in the Chirn Park neighbourhood in Southport on 2 November 1997, the church building was relocated to become the Anglican Church of the Good Shepherd at 4 Tarrant Drive, Mudgeeraba.

The Gold Coast City Council opened a public library at the Old Post Office Heritage Centre in Railway Street in 2004. However it did not attract a lot of patronage and it was decided to merge it into the Robina Library with the Mudgeeraba branch closing on 25 January 2017. The Gold Coast City Council operates a fortnightly mobile library service which visits Railway Street beside Mudgeeraba Pool.

Since 2005, under the Beaches to Bushland restoration program, Gold Coast City, with the help of Austinville Landcare Group, have worked on restoration of areas of upper Mudgeeraba Creek.

== Demographics ==
In the 2011 census, the suburb of Mudgeeraba had a population of 13,204 people, 51.3% female and 48.7% male. The median age of the Mudgeeraba population was 36 years, 1 year below the national median of 37. 69% of people living in Mudgeeraba were born in Australia. The other top responses for country of birth were New Zealand 8.5%, England 6.1%, South Africa 1.7%, Scotland 0.7%, Germany 0.7%. 88.7% of people spoke only English at home; the next most common languages were 0.7% Japanese, 0.6% German, 0.6% Mandarin, 0.4% Cantonese, 0.4% Spanish.

In the 2016 census, the suburb of Mudgeeraba had a population of 13,624 people.

In the 2021 census, the suburb of Mudgeeraba had a population of 14,578 people.

== Heritage listings ==
Mudgeeraba has a number of heritage-listed sites, including:

- Franklin Drive (crossing Mudgeeraba Creek): Dip Crossing Bridge (Old Mudgeeraba Creek Bridge)
- Hardys Road (corner of Gold Coast Springbrook Road): Persimmon Trees, Laver Family Park
- 30 Hardys Road (Hinterland Regional Park): Hardy's House
- 47 Railway Street: Wallaby Hotel (formerly Exchange Hotel)
- 57 Railway Street: Mudgeeraba Old Post Office (formerly Nerang Shire Council Chambers)
- 4 School Street: Mudgeeraba Special School (former Mudgeeraba State School)
- Mudgeeraba Creek upstream of the confluence with Bonogin Creek: Hardy's Bridge

== Education ==
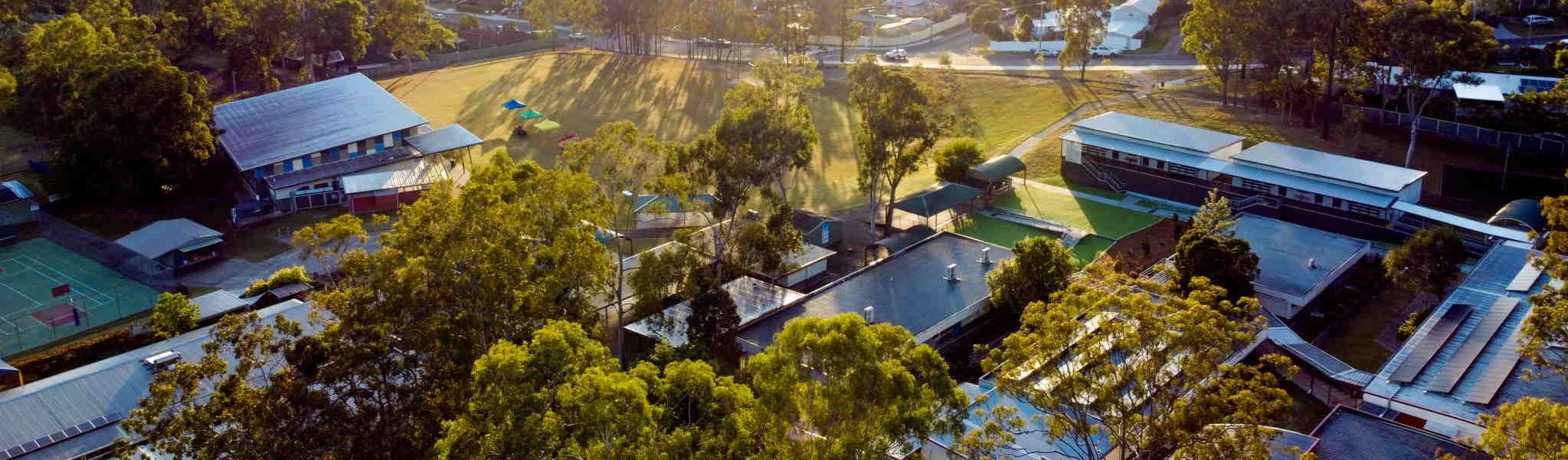
Aerial photograph of Mudgeeraba State School, 2023

Mudgeeraba State School is a government primary (Preparatory to Year 6) school for boys and girls at 32–48 Old Coach Road (28.0740°S 153.3527°E). In 2017, the school had an enrolment of 843 students with 64 teachers (51 full-time equivalent) and 33 non-teaching staff (21 full-time equivalent). It includes a special education program.

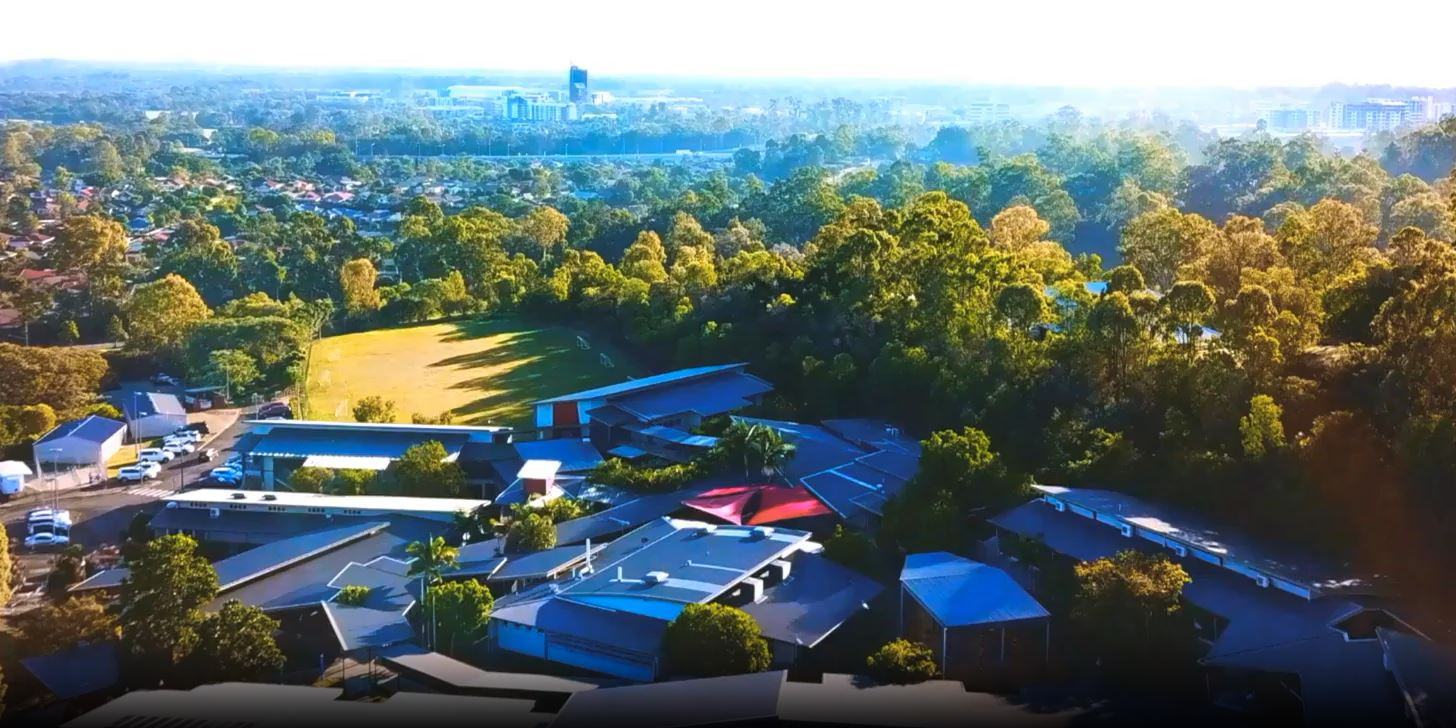
Clover Hill State School, 2023

Clover Hill State School is a government primary (Preparatory to Year 6) school for boys and girls on Clover Hill Drive (28.0917°S 153.3760°E). In 2017, the school had an enrolment of 947 students with 72 teachers (60 full-time equivalent) and 26 non-teaching staff (17 full-time equivalent). It includes a special education program.

Mudgeeraba Creek State School is a government primary (Preparatory to Year 6) school for boys and girls at Gold Coast-Springbrook Road (28.0867°S 153.3470°E). In 2017, the school had an enrolment of 705 students with 61 teachers (52 full-time equivalent) and 37 non-teaching staff (24 full-time equivalent). It includes a special education program.

Mudgeeraba Special School is a special primary and secondary (Preparatory to Year 12) school for boys and girls at 4–6 School Street (28.0778°S 153.3640°E). In 2017, the school had an enrolment of 160 students with 42 teachers (39 full-time equivalent) and 65 non-teaching staff (40 full-time equivalent).

Somerset College is a private primary and secondary (Preparatory to Year 12) school for boys and girls at Somerset Drive (28.0906°S 153.3750°E). In 2017, the school had an enrolment of 1,438 students with 102 teachers (99 full-time equivalent) and 98 non-teaching staff (88 full-time equivalent).

There are no government secondary schools in Mudgeeraba. The nearest government secondary school is Robina State High School in neighbouring Robina to the east.

== Infrastructure ==
Mudgeeraba is home to the Mudgeeraba Water Treatment Plant and a pump and pipeline runs from the Little Nerang Dam to the Water Treatment Plant operated by SEQWater. An above-ground pipeline runs from the WTP through Mudgeeraba to Tugun and Molendinar.

== Amenities ==
The Gold Coast City Council provides the Old Post Office (formerly the Mudgeeraba Library) to community groups and activities for both adults and children involving computing, technology, robotics etc.

The Springbrook Mudgeeraba branch of the Queensland Country Women's Association meets at the Bill Deacon Pavilion, Mudgeeraba Showgrounds at 115 Mudgeeraba Road, Worongary.

The headquarters of one of Australia's largest car clubs, Kustoms of Australia, is based in Mudgeeraba and has a building within the Gold Coast Historical precinct.

St Benedict's Catholic Church is at 2 Wallaby Drive (28.0975°S 153.3561°E). It is part of the Burleigh Heads Catholic Parish within the Archdiocese of Brisbane.

== Sport and recreation ==
A number of sporting teams represent the area, including the Mudgeeraba Redbacks, the local rugby league club who play home games at Firth Park, the Hinterland District Netball Association who run a large competition on Saturday mornings for players 5yrs to 17yrs and Monday nights for 13yrs to opens at Firth Park, Somerset Drive, Mudgeeraba, the Mudgeeraba Lawn Bowls Club situated just behind the Rugby Club, and the Mudgeeraba Soccer Club. Mudgeeraba Spartans Junior AFL Club plays their home games at Somerset College.

The starting point for the annual 96 kilometres (60 mi) cross-country Kokoda Challenge is in Mudgeeraba.

== Notable people ==
- Darius Boyd rugby league player
- Richard Clapton, musician
- d'Arcy Doyle, artist
- Lyndon Dykes; Scottish international footballer
- Ryan Johnson, actor
- Denan Kemp, former rugby league player and owner of "Bloke in a Bar"
- Bob McMaster
- Matthew Saunoa, 2006 New Zealand Idol champion
- Anna Torv, actress
