= Robin Loh =

Singaporean businessman and real estate developer

- 羅新權
- Born: Sumatra

Robin SK Loh (Chinese: 羅新權; 1928/29 – 28 August 2010) was a Singaporean businessman and real estate developer. Loh was best known in Australia as the founder of Robina, Queensland, a suburban town on the Gold Coast of Queensland. Robina, which turned 30 in 2010, is considered one of Australia's most successful planned communities. He was also credited as a leading businessman during Singapore's industrialization.

== Education ==
Loh obtained a Master of Arts in Asian political science in 1995 and subsequently a doctorate from University of California, Berkeley. The University of Berkeley considered his business success as a general degree and allowed him to pursue his degree in the Center for Southeast Asian Studies.

== Early life and career ==
Loh was born in Sumatra, and moved to Singapore during the 1940s at the age of 18. He began his career in business by salvaging abandoned U.S. Army military equipment. He also worked as a taxicab driver. In the early 1970s, Loh established the Robin Shipyard in Singapore.

In 1980, Loh purchased 20 square kilometres of grazing land on the southern Gold Coast in Queensland. Loh built the town of Robina, which grew into a planned community with a population of approximately 30,000 people, as of 2010. Loh built a town center with entertainment, parks and healthcare facilities.

In addition to Robina and other real estate holdings, Loh also held interests in research and development, hotels, banking, shipbuilding, manufacturing, shipping and oil rig construction during his career.

Robin Road and Robina House, in Singapore's Shenton Way, are named after Loh.

The government of Malaysia also granted him the title Datuk.

On 28 August 2010, Robin Loh died of breathing difficulties on an international flight from Singapore to Hong Kong, at the age of 81. He had suffered from Parkinson's disease.
