= Reedy Creek, Queensland =

Reedy Creek
- Suburb
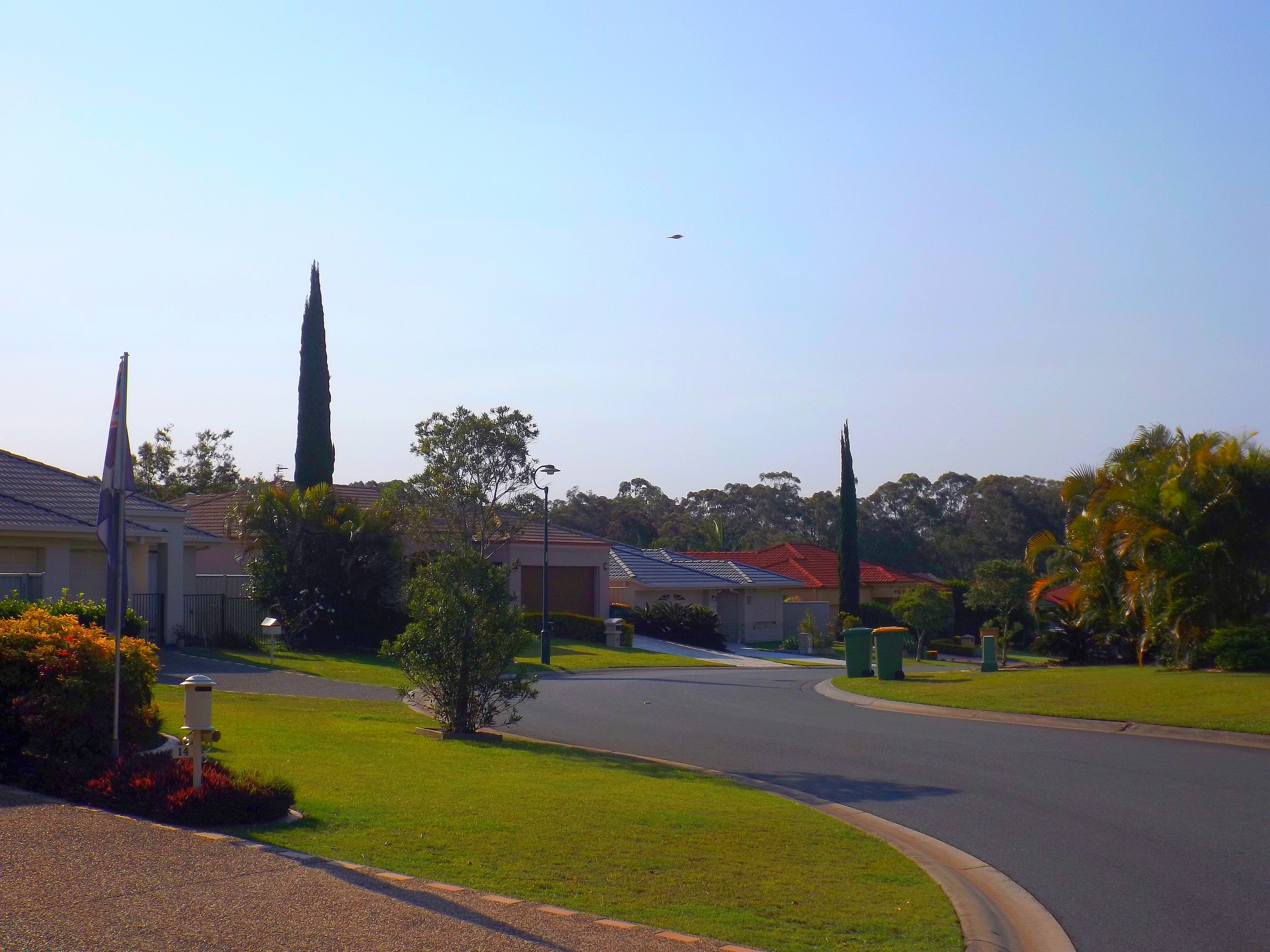
- Asperia Street, 2015

- Interactive map of Reedy Creek
- Coordinates: 28.1144°S 153.4033°E
- Country: Australia
- State: Queensland
- City: Gold Coast
- LGA: City of Gold Coast
- Location: 16.5 km (10.3 mi) SSW of Surfers Paradise; 19.0 km (11.8 mi) NW of Tweed Heads; 19.7 km (12.2 mi) S of Southport; 85.7 km (53.3 mi) SSE of Brisbane

Government
  - State electorate: Mudgeeraba
  - Federal division: McPherson

Area
  - Total: 6.4 km^{2} (2.5 sq mi)
- Elevation: 115 m (377 ft)

Population
  - Total: 9,610 (2021 census)
  - Density: 1,502/km^{2} (3,890/sq mi)
- Time zone: UTC+10:00 (AEST)
- Postcode: 4227
Suburbs around Reedy Creek
Mudgeeraba	Varsity Lakes	Burleigh Heads
Bonogin	Reedy Creek	Burleigh Heads
Bonogin	Tallebudgera Valley	Tallebudgera Valley

Reedy Creek is a suburb in the Gold Coast, Queensland, Australia. In the 2021 census, Reedy Creek had a population of 7,412 people.

== Geography ==
Located in the hinterland towards the southern end of the city, Reedy Creek is a developing residential area.

The elevation rises from 10 metres (33 ft) above sea level in the north of the suburb to over 190 metres (620 ft) in the south of the suburb at the end of Abbey Ridge Road. Reedy Creek rises in the south of the suburb and flows through it, exiting it to the north-east under the M1 into Varsity Lakes.

The land use is predominantly residential with the school facilities in the north of the suburb closer to the M1. Due to the hilly terrain and the creeks that flow through it, there is some undeveloped land.

== History ==
King's Christian College opened its first campus in Reedy Creek on 1 February 1980. It opened its second campus at Pimpama in 2015 and their third campus opened in Chambers Flat in 2020.

Gold Coast Seventh Day Adventist School opened on 29 January 1982. It was subsequently renamed Gold Coast Christian College. In 2026, it was renamed Graceview Adventist College (GAC).

Hillcrest Christian College opened on 2 February 1982.

In 2000, the Palm Beach Baptist congregation built Reedy Creek Baptist Church at 10 Genvale Road to replace their Palm Beach church. The Palm Beach Baptist Church opened on Saturday 8 December 1928. It was the first church opened in Palm Beach. It was in Ninth Avenue. In 1969 the original building was demolished and replaced with a brick building. In 2000 the Palm Beach site was sold.

== Demographics ==
In the 2016 census, Reedy Creek had a population of 6,659 people, rising to 7,412 by the time of the 2021 census.

== Education ==
King's Christian College is a private primary and secondary (Prep–12) school for boys and girls at 68 Gemvale Road (28.0972°S 153.3972°E). In 2017, the school had an enrolment of 2,175 students with 159 teachers (139 full-time equivalent) and 146 non-teaching staff (113 full-time equivalent). King's Christian College is a member of the Associated Private Schools, a school sporting association on the Gold Coast.

Graceview Christian College (formerly Gold Coast Christian College) is a private primary and secondary (Prep–12) school for boys and girls at 7–9 Bridgman Drive (28.1037°S 153.4002°E). In 2017, the school had an enrolment of 253 students with 21 teachers (19 full-time equivalent) and 12 non-teaching staff (8 full-time equivalent).

Hillcrest Christian College is a private primary and secondary (Prep–12) school for boys and girls at 21 Bridgman Drive (28.1032°S 153.3976°E). In 2017, the school had an enrolment of 1,348 students with 106 teachers (99 full-time equivalent) and 89 non-teaching staff (71 full-time equivalent).

There are no government schools in Reedy Creek. The nearest government primary school is Clover Hill State School in neighbouring Mudgeeraba. The nearest government secondary school is Robina State High School in Robina to the north.

== Transport ==
The suburb is bounded to the north-east by the Pacific Motorway (M1), to the east by Old Coach Road, then follows the ridgeline around to the north-west and then loosely follows Eden View Drive back to the M1.

In 2009, the Gold Coast railway line was extended to Varsity Lakes located on the eastern side of the Pacific Motorway, with a four lane bridge and pedestrian overpass linking it with Reedy Creek.

== See also ==
- Reedy Creek Observatory
