= Schmidt Farmhouse =

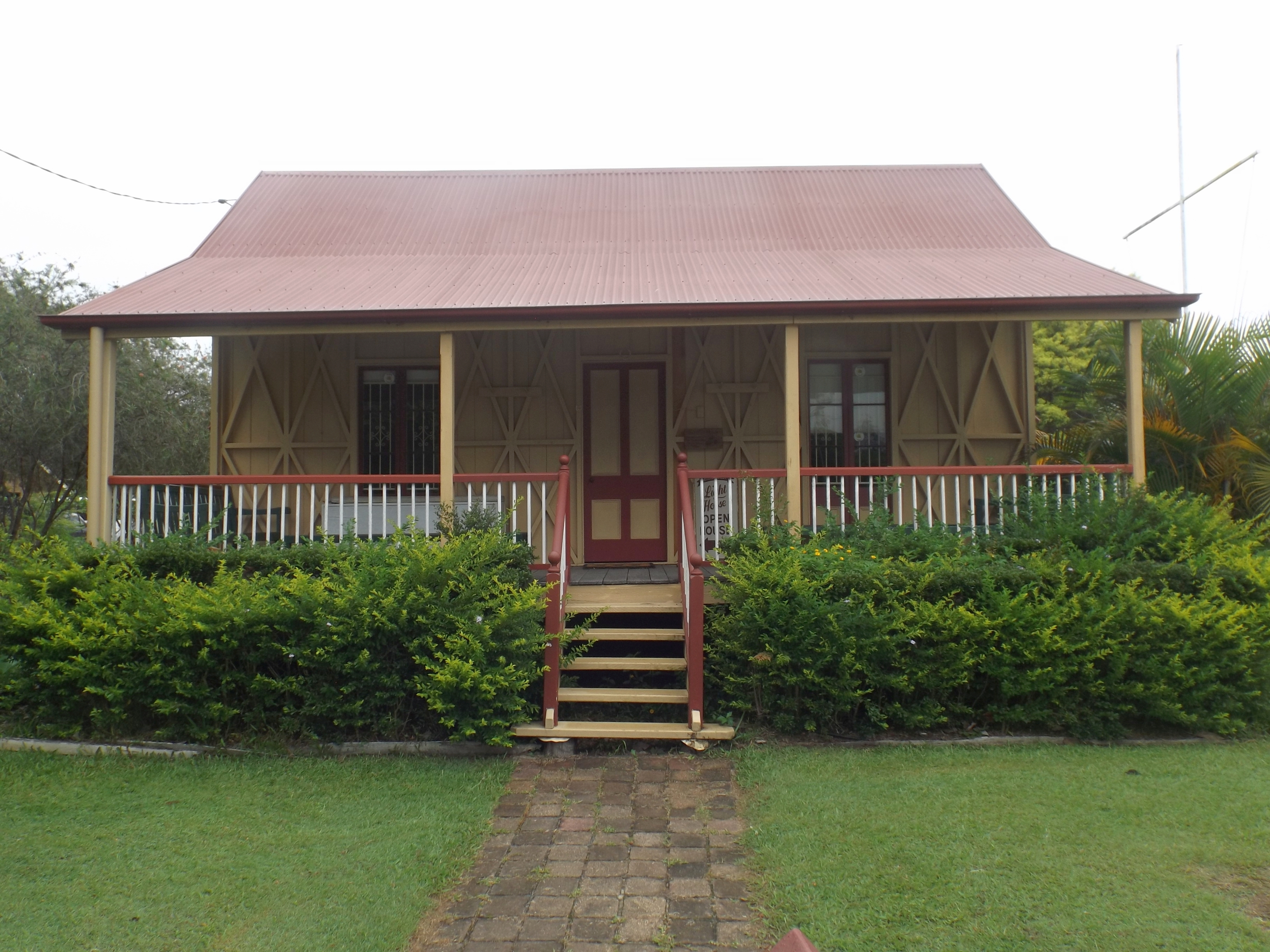
- Building in 2016

- Location within Queensland Location within Australia
- 28.0616°S 153.354°E
- Location: 3 Worongary Road, Worongary, City of Gold Coast, Queensland, Australia

History
- Design period: 1870s - 1890s (late 19th century)
- Built: 1880s - c. 1910

Queensland Heritage Register
- Official name: Schmidt Farmhouse & Outbuildings (former)
- Type: state heritage (built)
- Designated: 8 April 1997
- Reference no.: 601889
- Significant period: 1880s circa-c. 1910 (fabric); 1880s-1930s (historical)
- Significant components: farmhouse, dairy/creamery, barn, kitchen/kitchen house

Schmidt Farmhouse & Outbuildings is a heritage-listed homestead at 3 Worongary Road, Worongary, City of Gold Coast, Queensland, Australia. It was built from the 1880s to c. 1910. It was added to the Queensland Heritage Register on 8 April 1997.

== History ==
This farmhouse and outbuildings were constructed in the late 19th/early 20th centuries on land which in the 1850s was part of the Murry Jerry pastoral run, leased by William Duckett White of Beaudesert. The site was subsequently included in the 200 acres taken up by WD White as a pre-emptive selection in 1869, but the present buildings and structures appear to date to a later period, when the land was used for agricultural purposes. It was occupied by the Schmidt-Kurth family, Worongary dairy farmers, from c. 1901 to c. 1986.

Murry Jerry, a 25 square mile cattle run based around the present town of Mudgeeraba, was taken up by Alfred Compigne in 1852 and transferred to WD White in September 1853. Following the introduction of the Crown Lands Alienation Act of 1868, designed to open the large pastoral holdings of southern Queensland to agriculture and closer settlement, Murry Jerry was opened for general selection in April 1869. Initially timber getters took up the land, but were soon joined by farmers growing corn or maize, and later establishing dairies. Timber remained an important industry, especially after the establishment of the first saw mills in the Mudgeeraba area by the mid-1880s. Under the conditions of the 1868 Land Act, WD White applied in December 1868 for a pre-emptive selection of 200 acres of the Murry Jerry run (portion 7A), on the southern side of Worongary Creek, to commence at a marked tree on the right (southern) bank of the creek about 250 yards northwest from Worongary Hut. White's selection application made reference to improvements including a stockman's hut and a store/dairy. When the block was being surveyed early in 1869, surveyor GL Pratten noted a hut in the vicinity of the present farmhouse and outbuildings. No connection has been established between the huts (probably of slab construction) referred to in 1868/69 and the present structures.

White acquired freehold to the Worongary selection in 1878 and in August 1879 this was transferred to his son Ernest, who controlled WD White & Son's coastal properties from his base at Nindooinbah near Beaudesert following his father's move to Brisbane c. 1860. It is understood that during the 1870s Ernest White used the Worongary land for pastoral purposes.

In the 1880s the selection changed hands a number of times and its use for agricultural purposes appears to date from this period. The form and construction of the farmhouse core, with its 8" wide beaded vertical boarding, suggest that it also dates from this period. Title was transferred in April 1880 to Anne Stephens of Brisbane, widow of Thomas Blacket Stephens, who in 1877 had established the Hillview dairy on part of his 11,000 acre estate east of Worongary, acquired in the mid-1870s. The Stephens family subdivided portion 7A and title to the 163 acres west of the Mudgeeraba Road passed early in 1885 to the Starkey family, who had taken up land at upper Mudgeeraba in the early 1880s. Later in 1885 title passed to John Etchells of Nerang Creek, who in 1870 had been amongst the first to select land at what is now Surfers Paradise. Etchells mortgaged this land in the second half of the 1880s, and in mid-1889 title returned to Anne Stephens, and remained in the Stephens family (Stephens Estates Limited from 1904) until transferred to Mudgeeraba farmer Carl Schmidt in July 1912.

Johann Karl (Carl) Schmidt had emigrated from Germany to Queensland in 1881, aged 21 years. He appears to have worked as a farm labourer in the Nerang-Mudgeeraba district and in 1890 married Bertha Abraheim, whose parents had selected land in the Mudgeeraba district in the late 1870s. In 1891 Schmidt selected portion 24, parish of Mudgeeraba, where he took up mixed farming and later established a dairy. The Schmidt family moved to the Worongary property c. 1901, and may have leased the farm from the Stephens Estate, or managed it for them, prior to acquiring title in 1912. Schmidt descendants understand that the farmhouse was already on the property c. 1901.

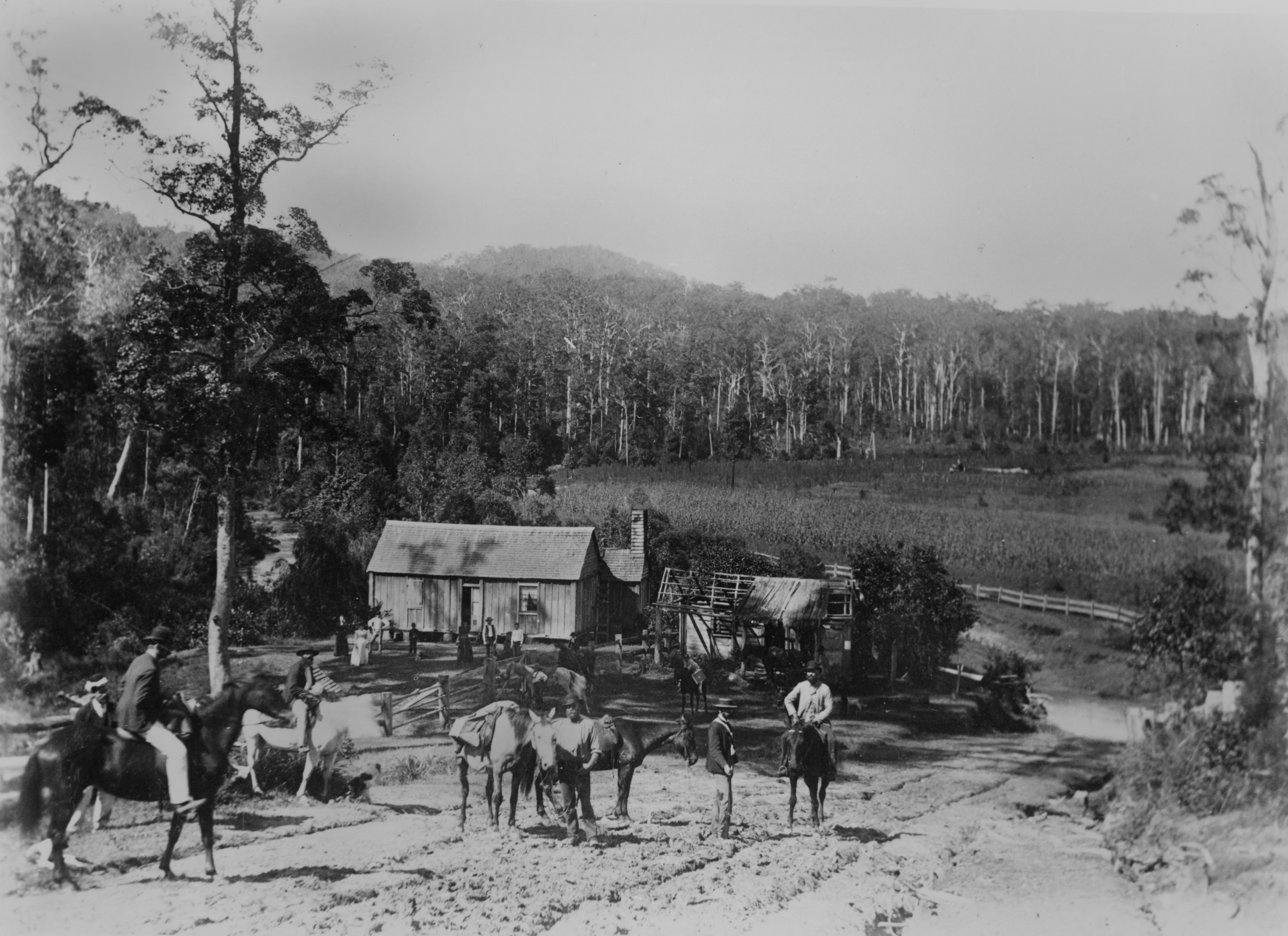
Farm in the Mudgeeraba district ca. 1891 (not Schmidt Farmhouse)

At the Worongary property the Schmidt family engaged in the district's principal economic activity: commercial dairying, heavily promoted by the Queensland government in the late 19th and early 20th centuries. In 1889 the Queensland Department of Agriculture (established 1887) sponsored the colony's first travelling dairy, which opened at Tallebudgera in April 1889 before moving on to other centres on the Gold Coast and throughout southeast Queensland, encouraging interest, demonstrating the technology, and imparting information and skills. The 1893 Meat and Dairy Act offered subsidies to dairy farmers, and introduced a tax on non-dairy cattle which funded the establishment of cheese factories and creameries. Quality controls were implemented with the introduction of compulsory grading of butter and cream in 1898, and inspection of dairies and factories under the Dairy Produce Acts 1904–05. Importantly, the Queensland Agricultural Bank was established in 1901 to increase the flow of credit to selectors - many of whom had taken up dairying. The Schmidt dairy was small - 20–30 cows - but typical of small selector farming practice in the early 20th century.

A number of turn-of-the-century alterations appear to have been made to the farmhouse, including: a detached kitchen joined to the main house; the shingled roof replaced with corrugated iron; weatherboard cladding on the external walls; new sash windows and window hoods; new front balustrading; ceilings and some internal walls lined with narrow tongue and groove boarding, with fretwork ceiling ventilators in the principal rooms; and a partition wall erected in the larger of the front rooms, to create a central hallway. These improvements, probably made by the Schmidt family and completed by c. 1910, reflect the rise in living standards which accompanied the expansion of dairying on the Gold Coast hinterland, as well as the determination of hard-working German immigrant families to succeed on the land.

Bertha Schmidt died in 1924 and in 1930, prior to Carl's death in 1931, the property was transferred to their youngest daughter, Mrs Eda Catherine Kurth. The farmhouse remained in the Schmidt-Kurth family until 1992, although by then on a substantially reduced site of 2,548 square metres (27,430 sq ft). The land between the farmhouse and Worongary Creek was acquired by Albert Shire Council in 1987–88 for use by the Mudgeeraba Show Society, and the Schmidt's former creamery is now located within the showgrounds. The bales and separating room, initially situated east of the house and later re-located south of Worongary Road, no longer exist.

Rapid, sustained population growth on the Gold Coast hinterland in the last 15–20 years, and particularly since the early 1980s, has led to substantial re-development of former farming areas for new residential estates. The former Schmidt farmhouse is understood to be one of the earliest, and one of the few, surviving farmhouses on the Gold Coast hinterland.

=== Current use ===
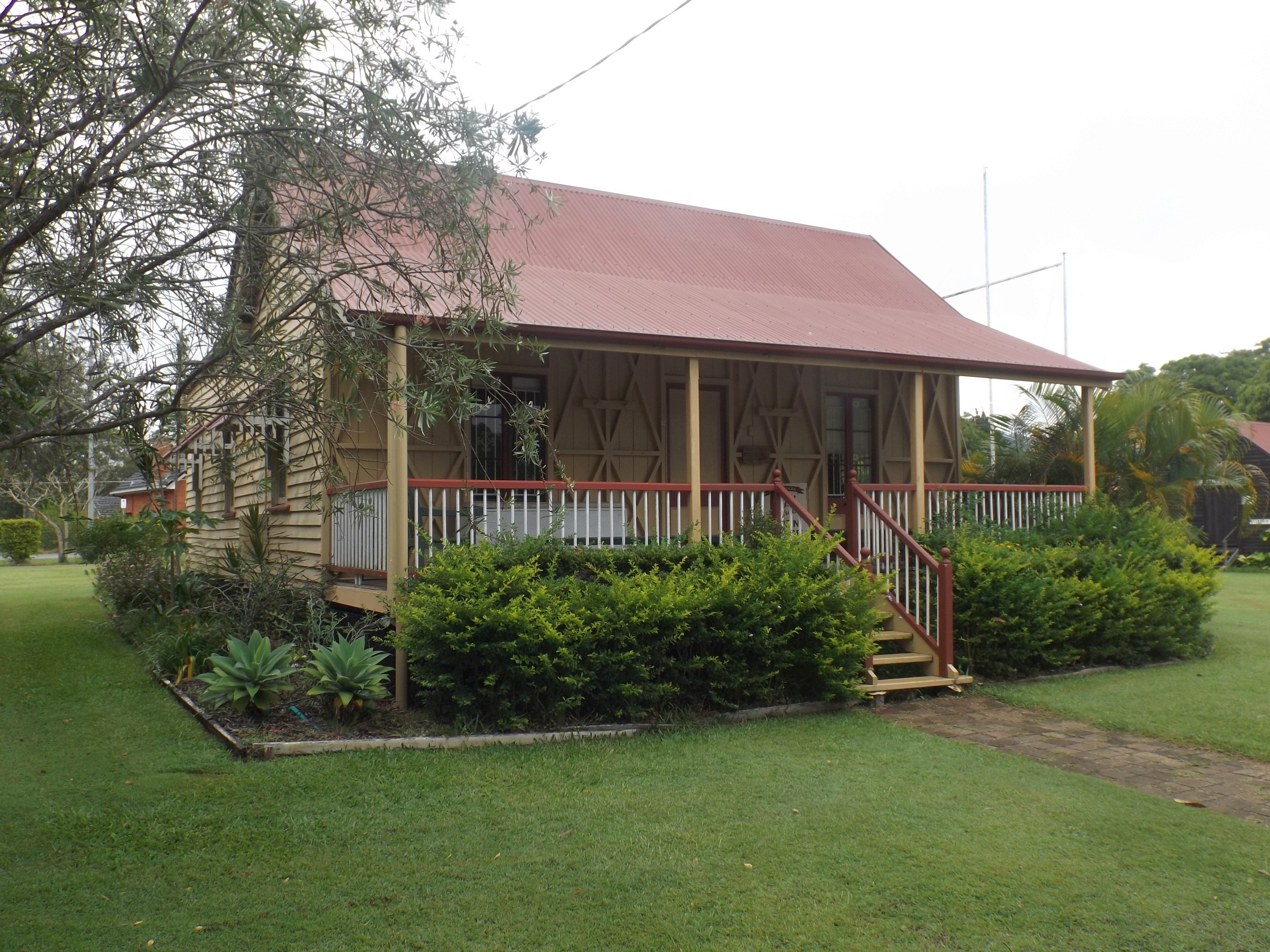
Structure in 2016

The farmhouse is now used as the 14th Light Horse Museum. The museum contains displays about First World War Australian Light Horse. A re-enactment troop participates in tent pegging with lances and swords in state and national events. The troop also participates in ANZAC Day ceremonies and other commemorations. The museum is also the headquarters of Gold Coast north branch of the National Servicemen's Association of Australia.

== Description ==
There are three main buildings at this site: a farmhouse, a slab barn, and a small creamery. There are also three other buildings: a timber shed of indeterminate age, a small timber outhouse, and a collapsed garage.

=== The farmhouse ===
The farmhouse is a timber framed and braced building raised on timber stumps and clad in weatherboards to the sides and rear, and in wide T and G boards with exposed studs and bracing to the front.

The house consists of two parts: the front section of two rooms with verandah, and an attached kitchen or service wing also of two rooms. Part of the rear verandah has been enclosed as a bathroom and small store room.

Existing shingle battens indicate that the house originally had a timber shingled roof, now replaced with corrugated iron sheeting. The roof is gabled in two directions. A brick fireplace and chimney are located at the rear of the building.

The front verandah has recently had the original floorboards replaced with new hardwood boards. A length of early handrail and dowel balustrade exists on the northwest corner. The verandah was until recently enclosed to create a sleep-out, with a second stair leading to the ground on the east side. Evidence of this stair exists in the form of holes to one of the verandah posts where the handrail was let in.

Examination of the house indicates that it originally contained only two rooms at the front section, with French doors opening out from both rooms to the front verandah. The room on the eastern side of the house was the larger of the two. The wide beaded vertical boards (approximately 200 millimetres wide) to the northern and southern walls and to the original dividing wall remain.

At a later date a wall was added to the larger room to form the present central corridor. This wall was constructed of 100-millimetre (3.9 in) wide v-jointed boards. The door and door hardware to this wall confirm its later construction. The v-jointed boards lining the ceiling to these rooms, the timber ceiling ventilators and the scotia cornices were probably added at this time as well. The ceilings may have been calico originally. The weatherboard walls to the eastern and western elevation may be original but if so were likely to have been unlined internally. The internal lining of 100-millimetre (3.9 in) tongue-and-groove boards are certainly a later addition. It is more probable that these walls were lined internally with studs exposed to the outside and that these have decayed and been replaced at a later date. This assertion is supported by inspection of the door and window sashes. The French doors at the front of the house have "lambs tongue" or ogee profile glazing bars which were hand moulded and which are more in keeping with earlier construction techniques. The windows have glazing bars which are machine moulded indicating that the sashes, if not the whole body of the windows, are later and likely to have been inserted when the east and west walls were reconstructed. Window hoods throughout are likely to date to this period also.

The current wall between the kitchen and the adjacent room, which is believed to have been a bedroom, is original judging by the wide vertical boards used in its construction. The opening in this wall does not appear to be original. In this section too, external walls appear to have been reconstructed and were, until recently, lined with 100-millimetre (3.9 in) tongue-and-groove boards as the main house.

A photograph dated c. 1910 indicates that changes had been made from what it is believed was the original construction, including the addition of dowel balustrading to the front verandah, the replacement of the original shingled roof with corrugated iron, and the addition of stairs to the eastern side of the verandah. Evidence of the earlier balustrading exists in the mortice holes to the north-eastern verandah post.

Subsequent changes included the enclosure of part of the front verandah and the construction of a lean-to laundry building on the west. These additions have recently been removed. Nothing remains of the laundry except for an area of concrete slab on the ground at the foot of the steps. Sheet lining to the early bathroom and to the ceiling of the rear verandah has been removed, floors sanded and the whole building painted. The early timber outhouse and shed remain.

=== The slab barn ===
To the west of the farm house is a large barn constructed primarily of hardwood slabs and milled weatherboards with a corrugated iron roof. The barn is 15 by 10 metres (49 by 33 ft) and is elevated off the ground. The floor of the central section is made of hardwood boards, while the lower floors to either side are laid with large timber slabs. The building has been rebuilt recently and some roof framing and sheeting are therefore quite recent. Some new hardwood slabs have been introduced recently.

=== The creamery ===
Located in the showgrounds is a small creamery believed to be part of the Schmidt's farm. It is a timber weatherboard structure about 3 metres (9.8 ft) square with a corrugated iron roof. The framing and sheeting of the roof appear to be later than the body of the building.

The building has a concrete floor, not original. The walls are sheeted at about three-quarter height with timber slats to provide ventilation. There is evidence of 100 millimetres (3.9 in) tongue-and-groove lining internally, some of which has been cut away because of termite damage. Window openings are filled with timber shutters.

== Heritage listing ==
The former Schmidt Farmhouse & Outbuildings was listed on the Queensland Heritage Register on 8 April 1997 having satisfied the following criteria.

The place is important in demonstrating the evolution or pattern of Queensland's history.

The former Schmidt farmhouse and outbuildings demonstrate the pattern of Queensland's history by providing evidence of the farming history of the Gold Coast hinterland in the late 19th and early 20th centuries. In particular, it illustrates the expansion of commercial dairying on Gold Coast selections in the early 20th century. The place is also illustrative of the success of German immigration to Queensland in the last quarter of the 19th century.

The place demonstrates rare, uncommon or endangered aspects of Queensland's cultural heritage.

As very few farmhouses from the late 19th century are known to survive in the Gold Coast hinterland, the former Schmidt farmhouse demonstrates rare aspects of Queensland's cultural heritage.

The place is important in demonstrating the principal characteristics of a particular class of cultural places.

The house, barn, creamery and other surviving outbuildings demonstrate some of the principal characteristics of a small, late 19th/early 20th century dairy farm, and the farmhouse core survives as rare illustration of earlier form, construction and materials employed in a small, c. 1880 rural dwelling house in the Gold Coast hinterland.
