= Tallebudgera Valley, Queensland =

Tallebudgera Valley
- Suburb
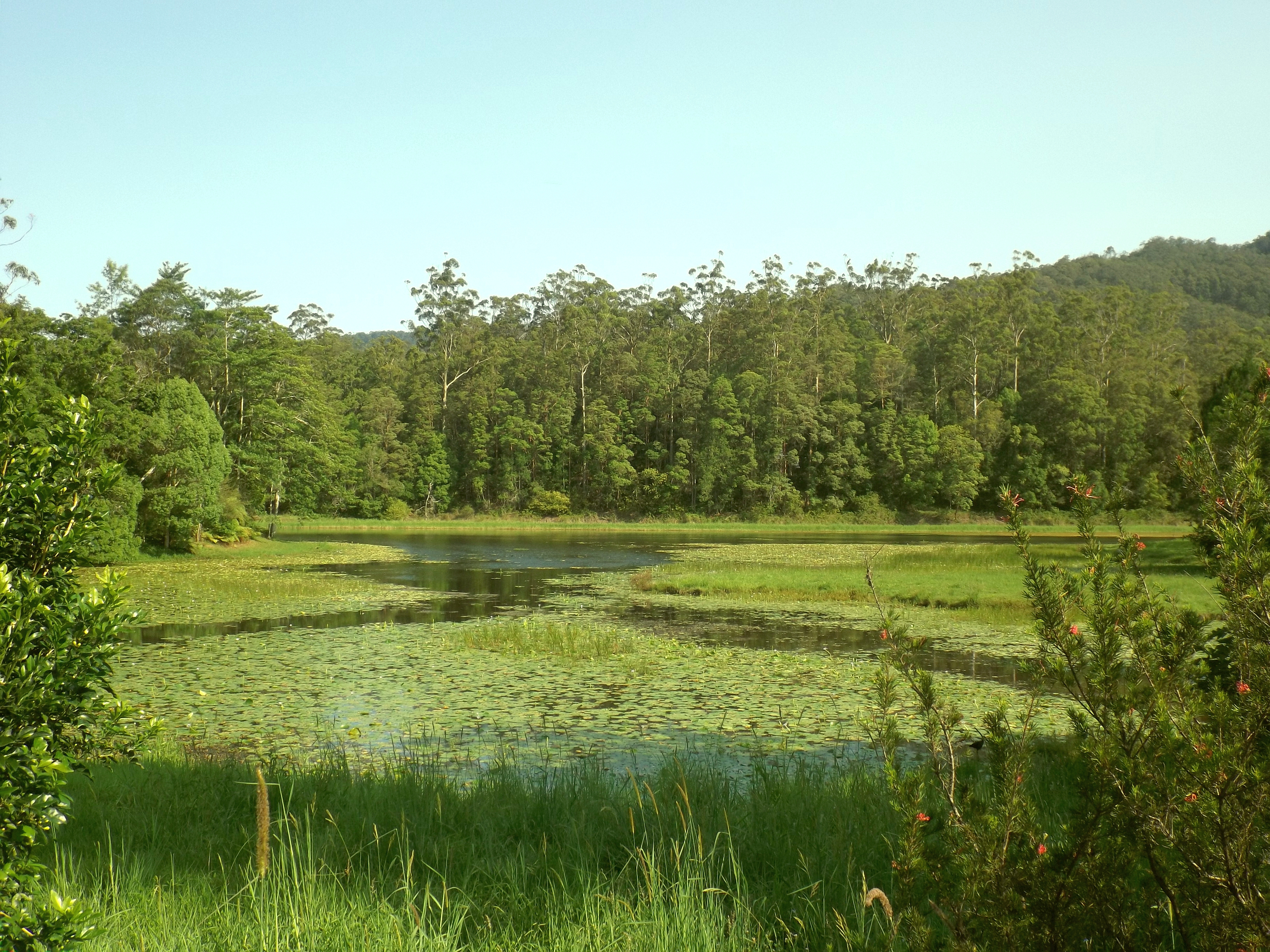
- Tallebudgera Creek Dam, 2015

- Interactive map of Tallebudgera Valley
- Coordinates: 28.1858°S 153.3627°E
- Country: Australia
- State: Queensland
- City: Gold Coast
- LGA: City of Gold Coast
- Location: 9.4 km (5.8 mi) WSW of Elanora; 22.5 km (14.0 mi) SSE of Surfers Paradise; 25.0 km (15.5 mi) S of Southport; 92.3 km (57.4 mi) SSE of Brisbane

Government
  - State electorate: Mudgeeraba
  - Federal division: McPherson

Area
  - Total: 60.1 km^{2} (23.2 sq mi)

Population
  - Total: 1,762 (2021 census)
  - Density: 29.32/km^{2} (75.93/sq mi)
- Time zone: UTC+10:00 (AEST)
- Postcode: 4228
Suburbs around Tallebudgera Valley
Austinville	Bonogin; Reedy Creek	Burleigh Heads
Springbrook	Tallebudgera Valley	Tallebudgera
Numinbah (NSW)	Upper Crystal Creek (NSW); Dungay NSW)	Currumbin Valley

Tallebudgera Valley is an outer locality in the City of Gold Coast, Queensland, Australia. It borders New South Wales. In the 2021 census, Tallebudgera Valley had a population of 1,762 people.

Ingleside is a neighbourhood within Tallebudgera Valley (28.1658°S 153.3817°E).

== Geography ==
Tallebudgera Valley is situated in the Gold Coast hinterland along the Queensland/New South Wales border. In the far south west of the suburb the elevation rises to 800 m above sea level. This area is protected within Springbrook National Park.

Tallebudgera Valley has the following mountains:

- Bally Mountain (28.1740°S 153.3378°E) 489 metres (1,604 ft)
- Boyds Butte (28.2317°S 153.3375°E) 581 metres (1,906 ft)
- Little Bally Mountain (28.1695°S 153.3454°E) 372 metres (1,220 ft)
- Mount Cougal (28.2365°S 153.3286°E) 715 metres (2,346 ft)
- Mount Cougal (East Peak) (28.2368°S 153.3299°E) 694 metres (2,277 ft)
- Mount Cougal (West Peak) (28.2360°S 153.3259°E) 724 metres (2,375 ft)
- Mount Gannon (28.1998°S 153.3154°E) 633 metres (2,077 ft)
- Tallebudgera Mountain (Durran) (28.2170°S 153.3594°E) 627 metres (2,057 ft)

== History ==
Westbury Provisional School opened in 21 Mar 1892, becoming Westbury State School on 1 January 1909. It was renamed Ingleside State School on 25 January 1926.

Tallebudgera Upper State School opened in 1923 and closed circa 1942. It was on the western side of Tallebudgera Creek Road (approx 28.20565°S 153.33389°E).

== Demographics ==
In the 2011 census, Tallebudgera Valley recorded a population of 1,557 people, 49.2% female and 50.8% male. The median age of the Tallebudgera Valley population was 43 years, 6 years above the national median of 37. 74.3% of people living in Tallebudgera Valley were born in Australia. The other top responses for country of birth were England 5.8%, New Zealand 5.5%, South Africa 0.9%, Netherlands 0.8%, Germany 0.6%. 89% of people spoke only English at home; the next most common languages were 0.8% French, 0.6% Dutch, 0.4% German, 0.3% Norwegian, 0.3% Maltese.

In the 2016 census, Tallebudgera Valley had a population of 1,624 people.

In the 2021 census, Tallebudgera Valley had a population of 1,762 people.

== Education ==
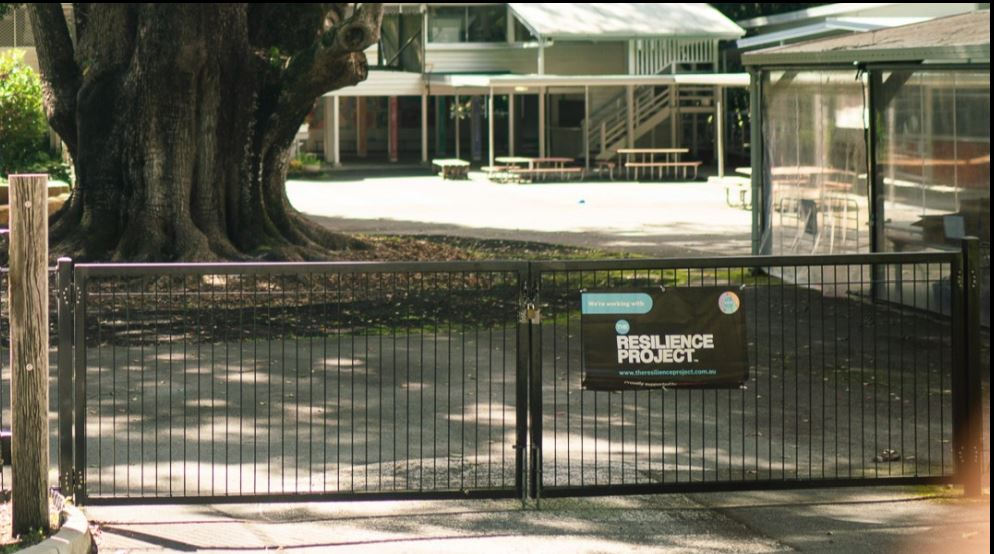
Ingleside State School, 2025

Ingleside State School is a government primary (Prep-6) school for boys and girls at 893 Tallebudgera Creek Road (28.1656°S 153.3814°E). In 2017, the school had an enrolment of 109 students with 13 teachers (7 full-time equivalent) and 6 non-teaching staff (4 full-time equivalent).

There are no secondary schools in Tallebudgera Valley. The nearest government secondary school is Elanora State High School in Elanora to the north-east.

== Amenities ==
The Gold Coast City Council operates a fortnightly mobile library service which visits Ingleside State School, Tallebudgera Creek Road.
