= Robina, Queensland =

Robina
- Suburb
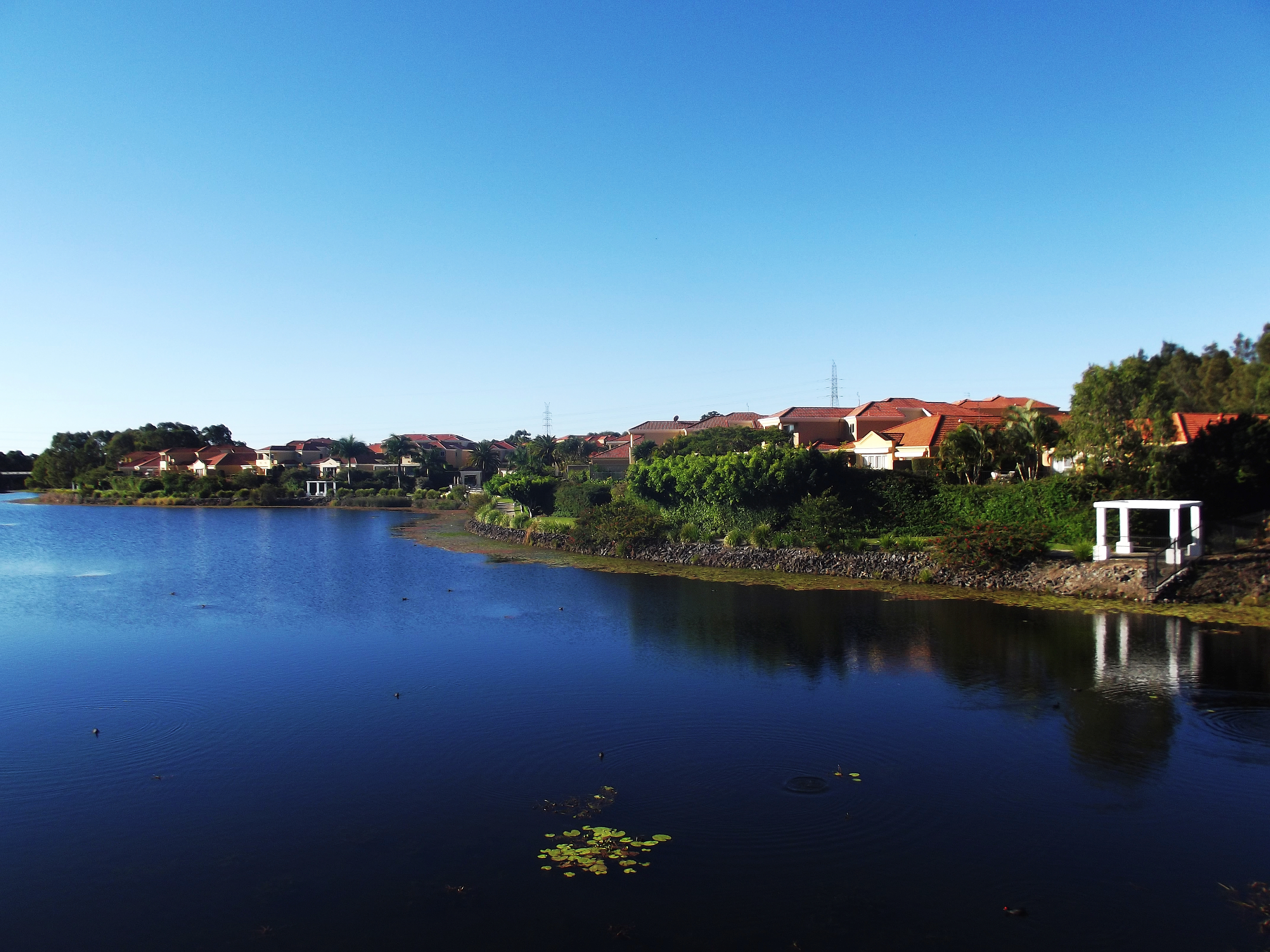

- Interactive map of Robina
- Coordinates: 28.0708°S 153.395°E
- Country: Australia
- State: Queensland
- City: Gold Coast
- LGA: City of Gold Coast
- Location: 9.8 km (6.1 mi) SSW of Surfers Paradise; 12.2 km (7.6 mi) SSW of Southport; 84.4 km (52.4 mi) SSE of Brisbane CBD
- Established: 1985

Government
  - State electorates: Mudgeeraba; Mermaid Beach
  - Federal division: McPherson

Area
  - Total: 15.0 km^{2} (5.8 sq mi)
- Elevation: 3 m (9.8 ft)

Population
  - Total: 25,659 (SAL 2021)
- Time zone: UTC+10:00 (AEST)
- Postcodes: 4226 (Robina); 4230 (Town Centre)
Suburbs around Robina
Merrimac	Clear Island Waters	Mermaid Waters
Mudgeeraba	Robina	Burleigh Waters
Mudgeeraba	Reedy Creek	Varsity Lakes

Robina (/rəˈbiːnə/ rə-BEE-nə) is a suburb in the City of Gold Coast, Queensland, Australia. Robina was one of the first master-planned residential communities in Australia. During its construction it was the largest master-planned community in Australia. In the 2021 census, Robina had a population of 25,659 people.

== History ==
In 1980, Singaporean real estate developer, Robin Loh, and local property developer, Arthur Earle, purchased 20 square kilometres (7.7 sq mi) of land in the southern Gold Coast, west of Broadbeach. The acquired land, which had previously been used for grazing, would become the suburb of Robina.

Engaging international urban designers Moshe Safdie and Robert Lamb Hart, Dr Loh formed the Robina Land Corporation, which spearheaded the development of Robina into a residential and commercial hub now home to more than 30,000 people and with a workforce 20,000 strong. Robina is considered one of Australia's most successful planned communities, and is one of the Gold Coast's fastest growing suburbs. In the decade from 2001 to 2011 Robina experienced population growth of 4.8 per cent per annum.

The name Robina was officially gazetted on 11 May 1985. The name is a combination of "Robin" (Loh's given name) and "a" (for Arthur Earle).

Robina State School opened on 29 January 1990.

In the original plan, Kerrydale was to be a separate suburb zoned for a golf course, hotel, accommodation and public space to the south-east of the Robina Town Centre. Kerrydale was officially approved on 20 February 1989 and can be seen on maps of that period. However, it was legislated in the Local Government (Robina Town Centre Planning Agreement) Bill 1992 that Kerrydale would be amalgamated into Robina. On 19 May 1995 the boundaries of Robina were officially extended to absorb Kerrydale.

Robina State High School opened on 29 January 1996.

The Robina Library opened in 2000 with a major refurbishment in 2013.

In January 2021, Arcadia College relocated from Varsity Lakes to Robina.

== Demographics ==
In the 2016 census, Robina had a population of 23,106. 59.8% of people were born in Australia. The next most common countries of birth were New Zealand 8.1%, England 6.2%, China 2.7%, South Africa 2.0% and Japan 1.4%. 78.0% of people spoke only English at home. Other languages spoken at home included Mandarin 3.3%, Japanese 1.9%, Cantonese 1.4%, Korean 0.8% and Spanish 0.6%. The most common responses for religion were No Religion 31.6%, Catholic 21.3% and Anglican 15.2%.

In the 2021 census, Robina had a population of 25,659 people.

== Education ==
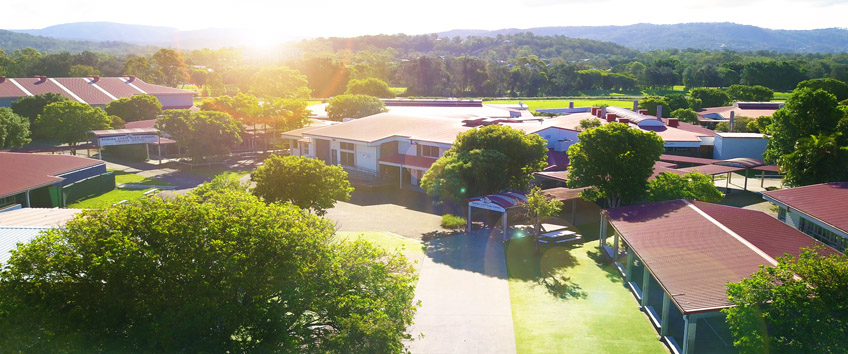
Robina State High School, 2022

Robina State School is a government primary (Preparatory to Year 6) school for boys and girls at Killarney Avenue (28.0712°S 153.3991°E). In 2017, the school had an enrolment of 802 students with 58 teachers (51 full-time equivalent) and 31 non-teaching staff (20 full-time equivalent). It includes a special education program.

Robina State High School is a government secondary (7–12) school for boys and girls at Investigator Drive (28.0735°S 153.3768°E). In 2017, the school had an enrolment of 1412 students with 115 teachers (107 full-time equivalent) and 48 non-teaching staff (35 full-time equivalent). It includes a special education program.

Arcadia College is a private secondary (7–12) school for boys and girls at 12 Centreline Place (28.0685°S 153.3779°E). In 2018, the school had an enrolment of 188 students with 20 teachers (19 full-time equivalent) and 9 non-teaching staff (7 full-time equivalent).

Australian Industry Trade College is a private secondary (10–12) school for boys and girls at 281 Scottsdale Drive (28.0916°S 153.3926°E). In 2017, the school had an enrolment of 332 students with 21 teachers and 26 non-teaching staff (25 full-time equivalent).

Bond University has its main campus at Robina.

== Amenities ==
The Robina Town Centre shopping centre, Robina Stadium and Robina Branch Library are located in Robina.

The Glades Golf Club is a par 72, Greg Norman designed golf course.

The Gold Coast Techspace in the Robina Community Centre on San Antonio Drive is a makerspace and education centre focusing on electronics, computer programming, and 3D printing.

The Gold Coast City Council operate a public library at the Robina Community Centre at 196 Robina Town Centre Drive.
