= Robina State High School =

Location
- Investigator Drive; Robina, Queensland; Australia; 28.074°S 153.375°E

Information
- Type: Public, secondary
- Motto: Stronger Together
- Established: 1996
- Principal: Rebecca McDonald
- Grades: 7–12
- Enrolment: 1530 (2024)
- Language: Mostly English
- Houses: Franklin Flames; Hinze Hawks; Gooding Gladiators; Laver Lighting
- Colours: Maroon, navy blue, and white
- Website: robinashs.eq.edu.au

Robina State High School is a coeducational independent public secondary school based in Robina, on the Gold Coast in Queensland, Australia. The school has a total enrolment of more than 1500 students, with 1530 students in 2024.

Since 2026, the school's principal has been Rebecca McDonald. The administration includes four deputy principals, one business manager, fourteen heads of department, two guidance officers, one provisional psychologist, one social worker, one school-based nurse, one school-based police officer, one school chaplain and three year level coordinators.

== Curriculum ==
=== Specialist programs ===
Specialist programs available to students at Robina State High School include:

- Academic Excellence Program (also known as the 'Kingfisher Program')
- Community – Action – Service (CAS) Program
- Dance Troupe/Academy
- Japanese Immersion
- Robina Sports Academy
  - Baseball Academy
  - Futsal/Football Academy
  - General Sports Academy
  - Golf Academy
  - Netball Academy
  - Triathlon Academy

=== English ===
English is a compulsory core subject across the Year 7–10 curriculum. Students in Year 8 and Year 9 undertake either Intermediate English or English Extension. English subjects available to students in Year 11 and Year 12 include the General subjects of English, English as an Additional Language, Literature and English and Literature Extension (Year 12 only), and the Applied subject of Essential English.

=== Mathematics ===
Mathematics is a compulsory core subject across the Year 7–10 curriculum. Students in Years 8 and 9 undertake either Intermediate Mathematics or Mathematics Extension, whereas students in Year 10 undertake one of the subjects of Intermediate Mathematics, Mathematics Extension or Foundation Mathematics. Mathematics subjects available to students in Years 10, 11 and 12 include the General subjects of General Mathematics, Mathematical Methods and Specialist Mathematics, and the Applied subject of Essential Mathematics.

=== Humanities ===
The Humanities faculty incorporates the compulsory core subjects of History and Geography across the Year 7–10 curriculum. Elective Humanities subjects available to students in Year 9 in include the Business subjects of Business Education and Digital Graphics. Elective Humanities subjects available to students in Year 10 include Business and Certificate I in Skills for Vocational Pathways (FSK10213). Humanities subjects available to students in Years 11 and 12 include the General subjects of Accounting, Ancient History, Business, Economics, Geography, Legal Studies and Modern History, and the Applied subject of Tourism.

=== Science ===
Science is a compulsory core subject across the Year 7–10 curriculum. Students in Years 8, and 9 undertake either Intermediate Science or Science Extension. Elective Science subjects available to students in Year 10 include Aquatic Practices and Health Science as well as physics, biology, chemistry, and general science (which includes all 4 sciences. Science subjects available to students in Years 11 and 12 include the General subjects of Biology, Chemistry, Marine Science and Physics, and the Applied subject of Aquatic Practices.

=== Languages ===
Japanese is the Language Other Than English administered at Robina State High School. In Years 7 and 8, Japanese is a compulsory subject undertaken for three semesters over the two-year period and becomes an elective subject from Year 9. Alternatively, academic students from Years 7–10 may participate in the Japanese Immersion program.

=== Health and Physical Education ===
Health & Physical Education is a compulsory core subject across the Year 7–10 curriculum. Health & Physical Education subjects available to students in Years 11 and 12 include the General subject of Physical Education and the Applied subjects of Sport & Recreation (Baseball, Golf, Futsal/Football, Netball and Triathlon).

=== The Arts ===
Year 7 students undertake the Arts Specialization subjects of Dance, Drama Extension, Music and Visual Arts, or the General Arts course incorporating visual and/or performing arts. In Year 8, students participate in one of the Arts subjects of Dance, Drama, Music and Visual Arts for one semester. Arts subjects available to students in Year 9 include Dance, Drama, Media Arts, Music and Visual Arts, whereas the Year 10 curriculum consists of the Arts subjects of Dance, Drama, Music, Visual Arts, Certificate II in Creative Industries (CUA20215) and Film, Television & New Media. Arts subjects available to students in Years 11 and 12 include the General subjects of Drama, Music Extension – Composition (Year 12 only), Music Extension – Performance (Year 12 only) and Visual Art, and the Applied subjects of Dance in Practice, Drama in Practice, Media Arts in Practice, Music in Practice and Visual Arts in Practice.

=== Home Economics ===
Home Economics is optionally studied for one term in Year 7 and by all students for one semester in Year 8. Home Economics subjects available to students in Year 9 include Food Studies, General Home Economics and Introduction to Fashion, whereas the Year 10 curriculum consists of the Home Economics subjects of Fashion, Food Studies and Introduction to Hospitality, which later a cert is offered for.

=== Technology ===
In Year 8, the Technology subject of Industrial Technology & Design is studied for one semester whereas the Year 9–10 curriculum consists of the elective Technology subjects of Digital Technologies, Graphics and Industrial Technology & Design. Technology subjects available to students in Years 11 and 12 include the General subjects of Design, Digital Solutions and Food & Nutrition, and the Applied subjects of Furnishing Skills, Hospitality Practices, Industrial Graphics Skills and Industrial Technology Skills.

=== Vocational education and training ===
- Certificate I & II in Information, Digital Media & Technology (ICT10115/ICT20115)
- Certificate II in Engineering (Pathways) (MEM20413)
- Certificate II in Furniture Making (Pathways) (MSF20313)
- Certificate II in Hospitality (SIT20316)
- Certificate II in Public Safety (Aquatic Rescue) (PUA21012)
- Certificate II in Skills for Work & Vocational Pathways (FSK20113)
- Certificate III in Business Administration (BSB30415)
- Certificate III in Early Childhood Education & Care (CHC30113)
- Certificate III in Fitness (SIS30315)
- Certificate III in Health Services Assistance/Certificate II in Health Support Services (HLT33115/HLT23215)
- Certificate III in Screen & Media (CUA31015)
- Certificate IV in Dance (CUA40113)
- Certificate IV in Music Industry (CUA40915)
- Diploma of Business (SB50207)

== Co-curricular activities ==
Co-curricular activities include:

- Parliamentary World Youth Debate Congress
- Gold Coast debating competition
- Instrumental Music
  - String Ensemble
  - Concert Band
  - Stage Band
  - Big Band
  - Percussion Ensemble
- Leo's Club
- Student Council
- Junior and senior school dance troupes
- Showcase activities
  - Acoustic Night
  - Dance Night
  - Dramafest
  - Extension Music Showcase
- Student leadership activities
  - Altitude Day
  - GU Business Ambassadors
  - International Ambassadors
  - YLead
- Indigenous support activities
- Support staff-coordinated lunchtime activities for students
- Harmony Day
- Inter-school sports programs
- Recreational sport program
- Community – Action – Service (CAS) Program
  - Art workshops
  - Beach challenges
  - Dragon boating
  - Go-karting
  - Laser skirmish
  - Organising and running fundraising barbeques
  - Sailing
- Japanese Immersion
  - Interacting with Japanese guests
  - Japanese art, cooking and cultural activities
  - World online Japanese art and language competitions
  - Taiko Drum Club
  - Immersion camps

== Notable alumni ==
- Arianna Clarke, professional Australian rules footballer (Brisbane Lions)
- Lyndon Dykes, professional association footballer
- Haeji Kang, professional golfer
- Tammy McMillan, professional baseball player
- Jasmine Parr, professional boxer and kickboxer
- Taylah Welch, professional baseball player
- Amy Yang, professional golfer
