= Outward Bound Australia =

- Abbreviation: OBA
- Formation: 1956; 70 years ago
- Founded at: Australian Capital Territory
- Type: Not-for-profit organisation
- Purpose: Outdoor Education
- Headquarters: Tharwa, Australian Capital Territory
- Location: Namadgi National Park
- Region served: Australia
- Affiliations: Outward Bound International
- Website: outwardbound.org.au

Outward Bound Australia (OBA) is the Australian chapter of the not-for-profit organisation Outward Bound International. Since its founding in 1956, Outward Bound Australia has made outdoor education courses available to the community with the aim of developing teamwork skills and raising environmental awareness Australia wide.

Outward Bound's focus on personal and leadership development through outdoor adventure activities has made it popular amongst a diverse array of groups and individuals within the community. Over 250,000 Australians aged between 13 and 75 have completed a course. Notably, OBA maintains a number of longstanding relationships with partner schools such as the Cranbrook School in Sydney which has made OBA courses a mandatory part of their school curriculum.

== History ==
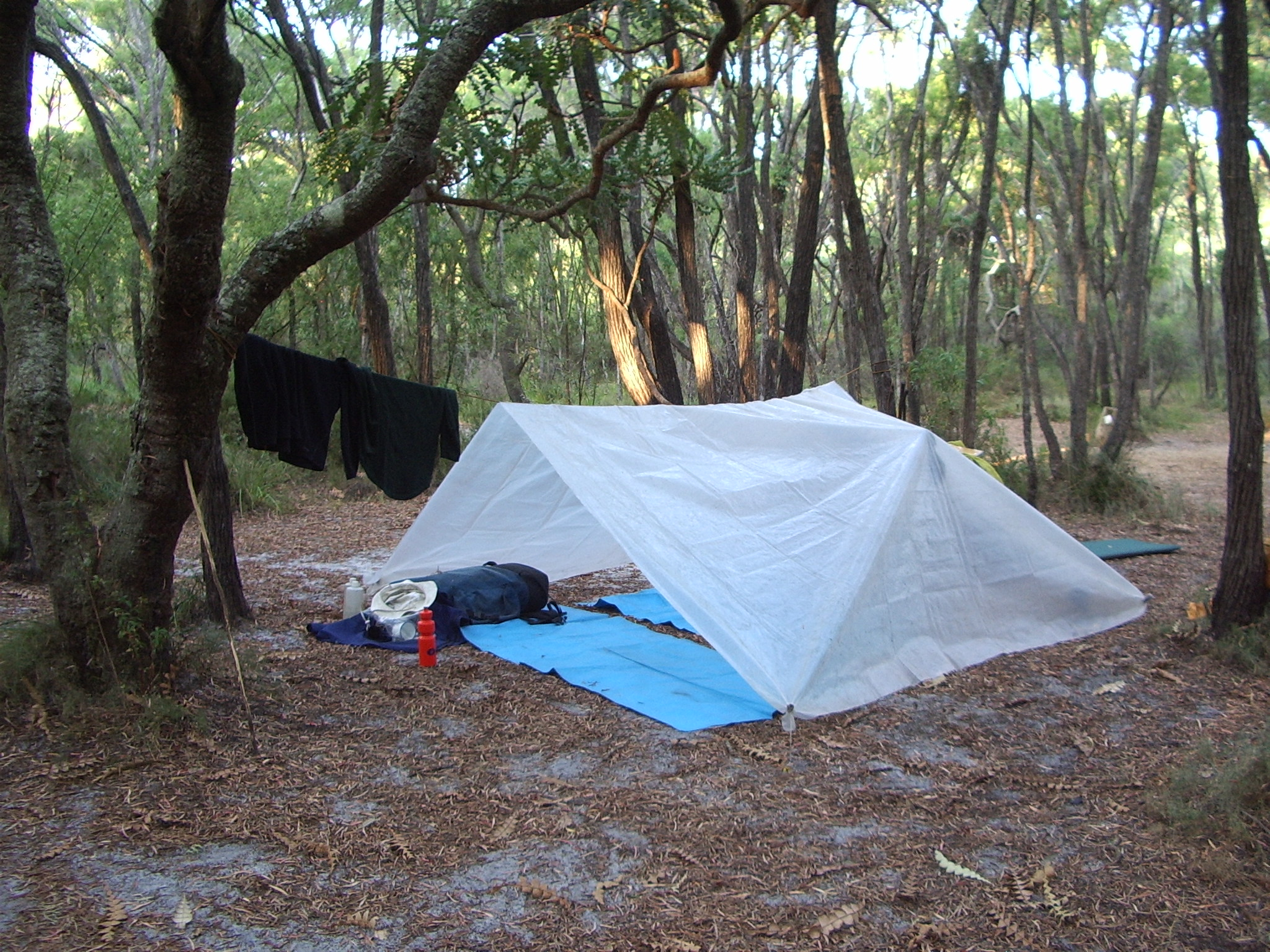
Outward Bound Camp Bivouac in D'Entrecasteaux National Park

OBA's outdoor education courses are based on the principles adopted by German educator Kurt Hahn to train young British seamen to survive in the North Atlantic Ocean during the Second World War.

The first course in Australia was held in 1956, three years later another course was conducted at Fisherman's Point, on the Hawkesbury River. Warwick Deacock, the first Director of the Outward Bound School, adopted the location as Outward Bound's homebase in Australia until 1973.

Presently, OBA operates from Namadgi National Park in the south western region of the Australian Capital Territory but also conducts courses in the Snowy River National Park (Victoria), Walpole-Nornalup National Park and D'Entrecasteaux National Park (Western Australia), Kosciuszko National Park and Toonumbar National Park (NSW) ranging from 7–26 days in length on offer 12 months a year.

As part of the OBA Manifesto (which details the idea of reaching the community as a whole), scholarship opportunities are available for applicants who demonstrate financial, demographic or socio-economic disadvantage.

== Evaluation of long-term program impacts ==
Outward Bound Australia engaged heavily in research throughout the 1980s and 1990s to design an evaluation procedure that would accurately measure the impact their courses have on participants. Work conducted by Garry Richards and James Neill, especially the Life Effectiveness Questionnaire (LEQ), is a leading tool for the Australian outdoor industry but as of late has gained popularity worldwide. The LEQ aims to measure the impact of a program on student self-perception from the beginning to the end of the experienced based learning program with particular regards to life skills such as time management, social competence, intellectual flexibility, emotional control, and self confidence.

In 2002 Outward Bound began to deliver its annual Aspiring Leaders program in to measure responses from the communities it had engaged with. Based on LEQ, participants reported a major change in achievement motivation and task leadership.

== Corporate programs ==
Australian companies, such as Boral, use Outward Bound courses as a team building activity for staff and in order to develop leadership skills for those moving into management positions.

The Country Fire Authority has incorporated Outward Bound courses into their annual training calendar for adult and youth volunteer firefighters for 14 years, using the outdoor wilderness based program to enhance team performance in preparation for natural disasters such as the Black Saturday bushfires that engulfed Victoria in early 2009. In a show of support, the Outward Bound alumni program orchestrated the cleanup of a property owned by a Community Relief Centre volunteer worker who lost her home in the fires.

Canberra's Super 14 Rugby team, the Brumbies, participated in an Outward Bound camp and a three-day mountain bike ride to Mount Kosciuszko in 2009 after Stephen Hoiles took over as team captain from Stirling Mortlock earlier in the year, and Andy Friend succeeded Laurie Fisher as head coach in late 2008.

== Public programs ==
With the support of community organisations such as the Lions Clubs and The Smith Family, OBA offer several programs to the general public including one aimed at young adults (Navigator Program), a more physically adventurous course (Pinnacle Program) and a 22-day challenge course (Summit to Sea) which takes participants from Tharwa in Australia's Capital Territory, to Mount Kosciuszko finally ending up on Victoria's southern coast along the Snowy River.

== Schools programs ==
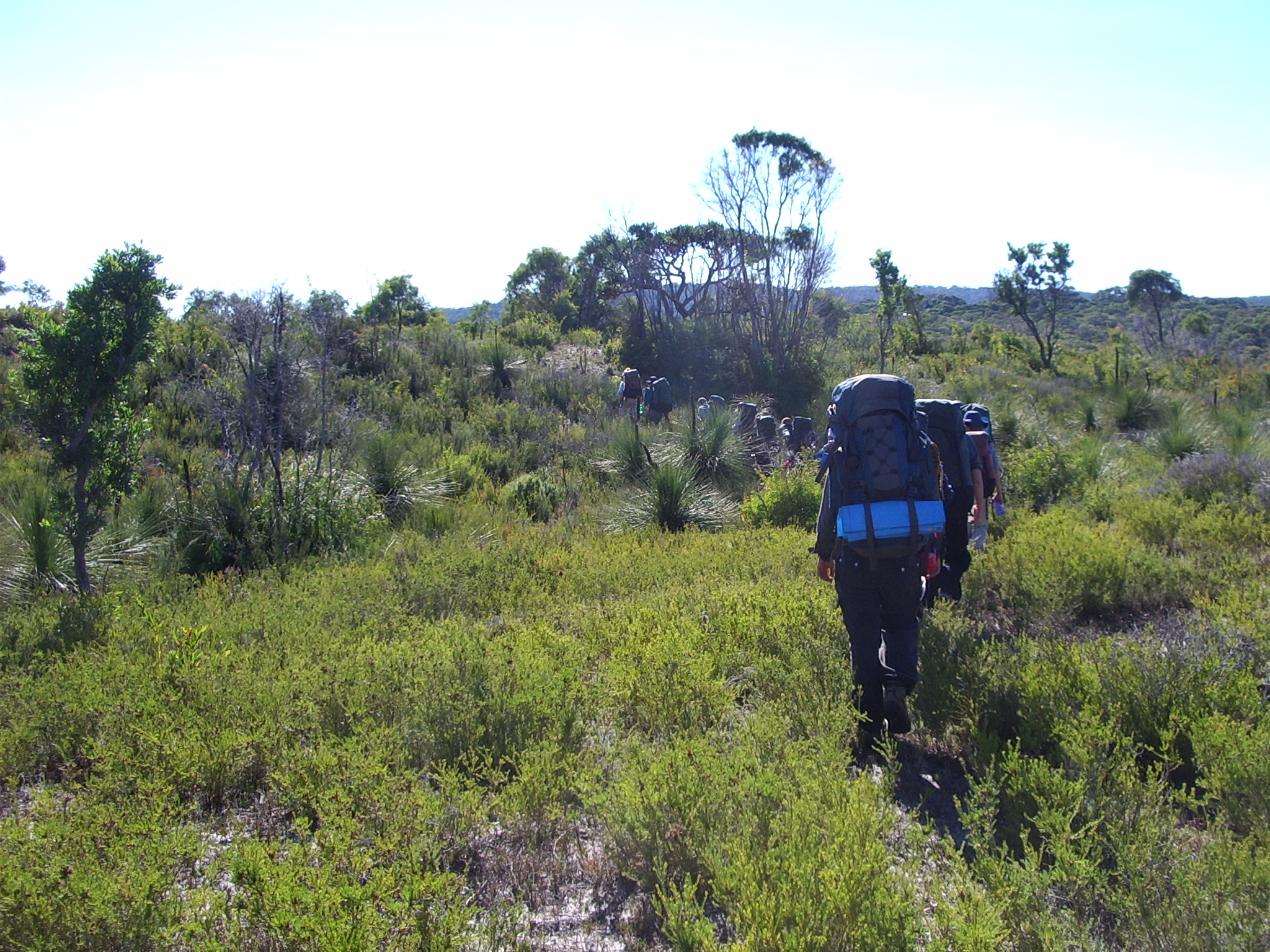
Outward Bound School Group in Walpole-Nornalup National Park

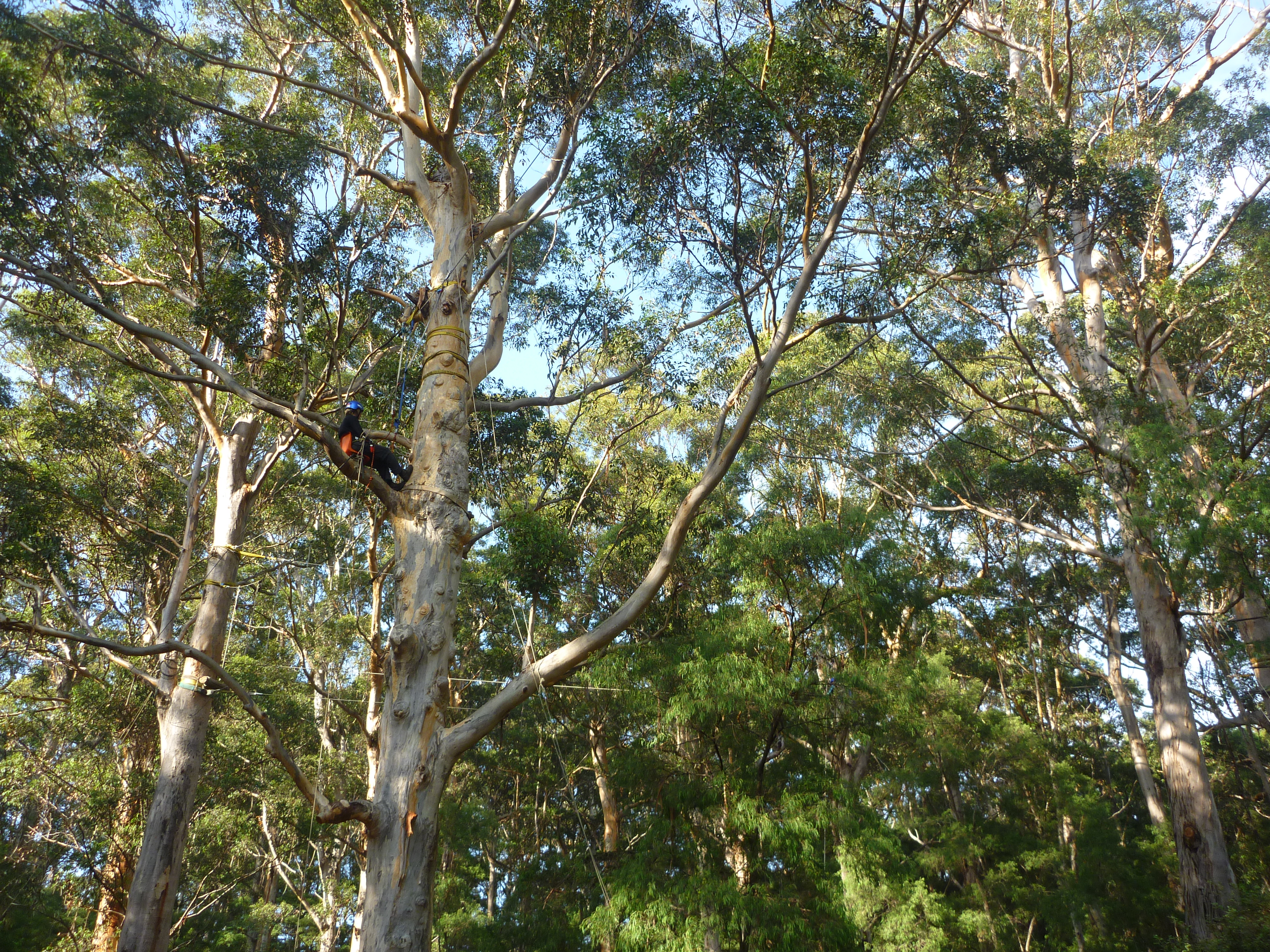
Outward Bound High Ropes Course

Public, Catholic and Independent schools across Australia use Outward Bound programs to support curricula. School programs range from a 12-member group program (such as the one devised for Total Education in Warwick) to sequential full year groups of 400+ students that schools such as The Cranbrook School in Sydney conduct annually.

In 2009 OBA partnered with over 50 schools, some of which include:

Australian Capital Territory

- Brindabella Christian College
- Canberra Girls' Grammar School
- Marist College
- Radford College

New South Wales

- Albury High School
- All Saints College, St Josephs Lochinvar
- Ascham School
- Bega High School
- Boorowa Central School
- Braidwood Central School
- Coonamble High School
- Cowra High School
- Cranbrook School
- Faith Lutheran School
- Francis Greenaway High School
- Lumen Christi Catholic College
- Maitland High School
- Marist College Kogarah
- Monaro High School
- Murrumburrah High School
- Muswellbrook High School
- Oakhill College
- Scone TAFE
- Scone Grammar School
- Singleton High School
- St. Gregory's College
- St. Joseph's High School, Aberdeen
- St. Patrick's Parish School, Cooma
- St. Raphael's Central School, Cowra
- Ulladulla High School
- Young High School
- Yass High School

Queensland

- A.B. Paterson College
- Coombabah State High School
- Coomera Anglican College
- Elanora State High School
- Marymount College
- Miami State High School
- Nerang State High School
- Robina State High School
- School of Total Education
- Southport State High School
- St. Stephen's College
- Upper Coomera Secondary College

Victoria

- Beaconhills College
- Catherine McAuley College
- Chaffey Secondary College
- Irymple Secondary College
- Lighthouse Christian College
- Notre Dame College, Shepparton
- Sacred Heart Catholic College
- St. Francis Xavier Catholic College
- Woodleigh School

Western Australia

- Albany Senior High School
- Boyup Brook District High School
- Bridgetown High School
- Bunbury Catholic College
- Bunbury Cathedral Grammar School
- Bunbury Senior High School
- Christian Brothers Agricultural College Tardun
- Collie Senior High School
- Geraldton Grammar School
- Great Southern Grammar
- Kearnan College Manjimup
- Manjimup Senior High School
- Newton Moore Senior High School
- Perth College
- Penrhos College
- Tranby College
- The International School of WA
- WA College of Agriculture Denmark
