= Willow Vale, Queensland =

Willow Vale
- Suburb
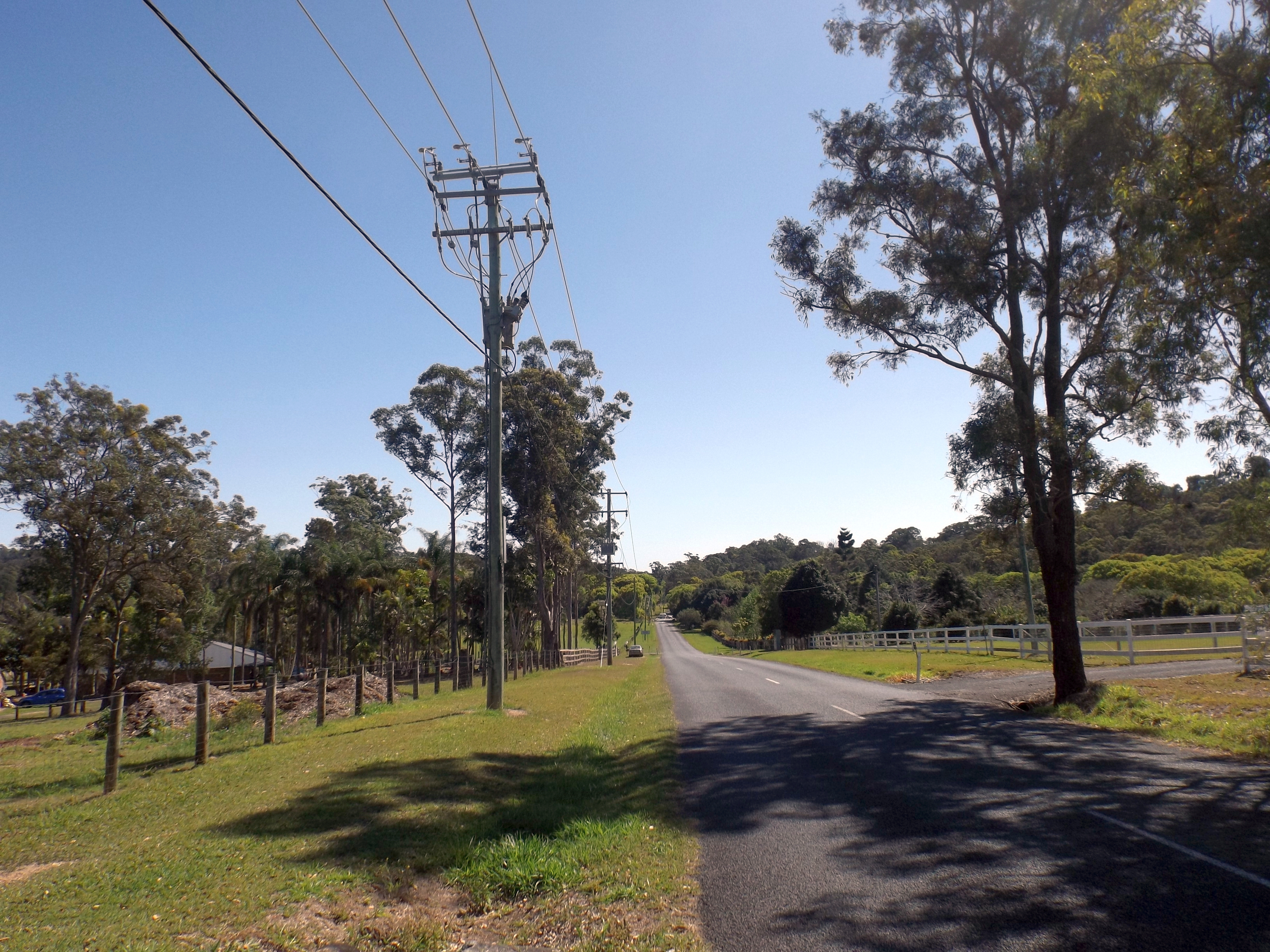
- Hotham Creek Road

- Interactive map of Willow Vale
- Coordinates: 27.8427°S 153.2647°E
- Country: Australia
- State: Queensland
- City: Gold Coast City
- LGA: City of Gold Coast
- Location: 4.0 km (2.5 mi) WNW of Upper Coomera; 4.6 km (2.9 mi) SW of Pimpama; 24.7 km (15.3 mi) NNW of Southport; 27.9 km (17.3 mi) NNW of Surfers Paradise; 54.7 km (34.0 mi) SSE of Brisbane CBD

Government
  - State electorate: Coomera
  - Federal division: Forde

Area
  - Total: 21.5 km^{2} (8.3 sq mi)

Population
  - Total: 2,279 (2021 census)
  - Density: 106.00/km^{2} (274.5/sq mi)
- Time zone: UTC+10:00 (AEST)
- Postcode: 4209
Suburbs around Willow Vale
Kingsholme	Pimpama	Pimpama
Kingsholme	Willow Vale	Upper Coomera
Wongawallan	Wongawallan	Upper Coomera

Willow Vale is a rural locality in the City of Gold Coast, Queensland, Australia. In the 2021 census, Willow Vale had a population of 2,279 people.

== History ==
Before the official naming of this locality, the area was generally referred to as Pimpama.

== Demographics ==
In the 2016 census, Willow Vale had a population of 2,096 people.

In the 2021 census, Willow Vale had a population of 2,279 people.

== Heritage listings ==
Heritage listings at Willow Vale include:

- Laurel Hill Farmhouse, 105 Ruffles Road

== Education ==
There are no schools in Willow Vale. The nearest government primary schools are Pimpama State School in neighbouring Pimpama to the north, Coomera Springs State School in neighbouring Upper Coomera to the east, and Upper Coomera State College in neighbouring Upper Coomera to the south-east. The nearest government secondary schools are Pimpama State Secondary College in Pimpama to the north-east and Upper Coomera State College in neighbouring Upper Coomera to the south-east.

== Amenities ==
There are a number of parks in the area:

- Blacks Road Parklands 1 (27.8384°S 153.2544°E)
- Blacks Road Parklands 2 (27.8398°S 153.2545°E)
- Coulter Road Reserve (27.8448°S 153.2845°E)
- Crystal Creek Reserve (27.8510°S 153.2638°E)
- Galt Road Park (27.8592°S 153.2621°E)
- Gerrale Dr Reserve 1 (27.8319°S 153.2513°E)
- Gerrale Dr Reserve 2 (27.8334°S 153.2484°E)
- Gerrale Dr Reserve 3 (27.8355°S 153.2465°E)
- Heritage Park (27.8302°S 153.2887°E)
- Hotham Ruffles Reserve (27.8683°S 153.2721°E)
- Lower Galt Road Reserve (27.8563°S 153.2700°E)
- Peanba Park (27.8556°S 153.2796°E)
- Pittas Place Reserve (27.8486°S 153.2619°E)
- Richardson Family Park (27.8389°S 153.2548°E)
- Ruffles Rd Reserve (27.8480°S 153.2772°E)
- Rufous Whistler Park (27.8233°S 153.2802°E)
- The Dell Park (27.8443°S 153.2488°E)
- The Grange Common (27.8415°S 153.2513°E)
- The Grange Environmental Park (27.8412°S 153.2377°E)
- Willowvale Reserve (27.8630°S 153.2742°E)
- Wongawallan Reserve (27.8687°S 153.2560°E)
