= Wongawallan, Queensland =

Wongawallan
- Suburb
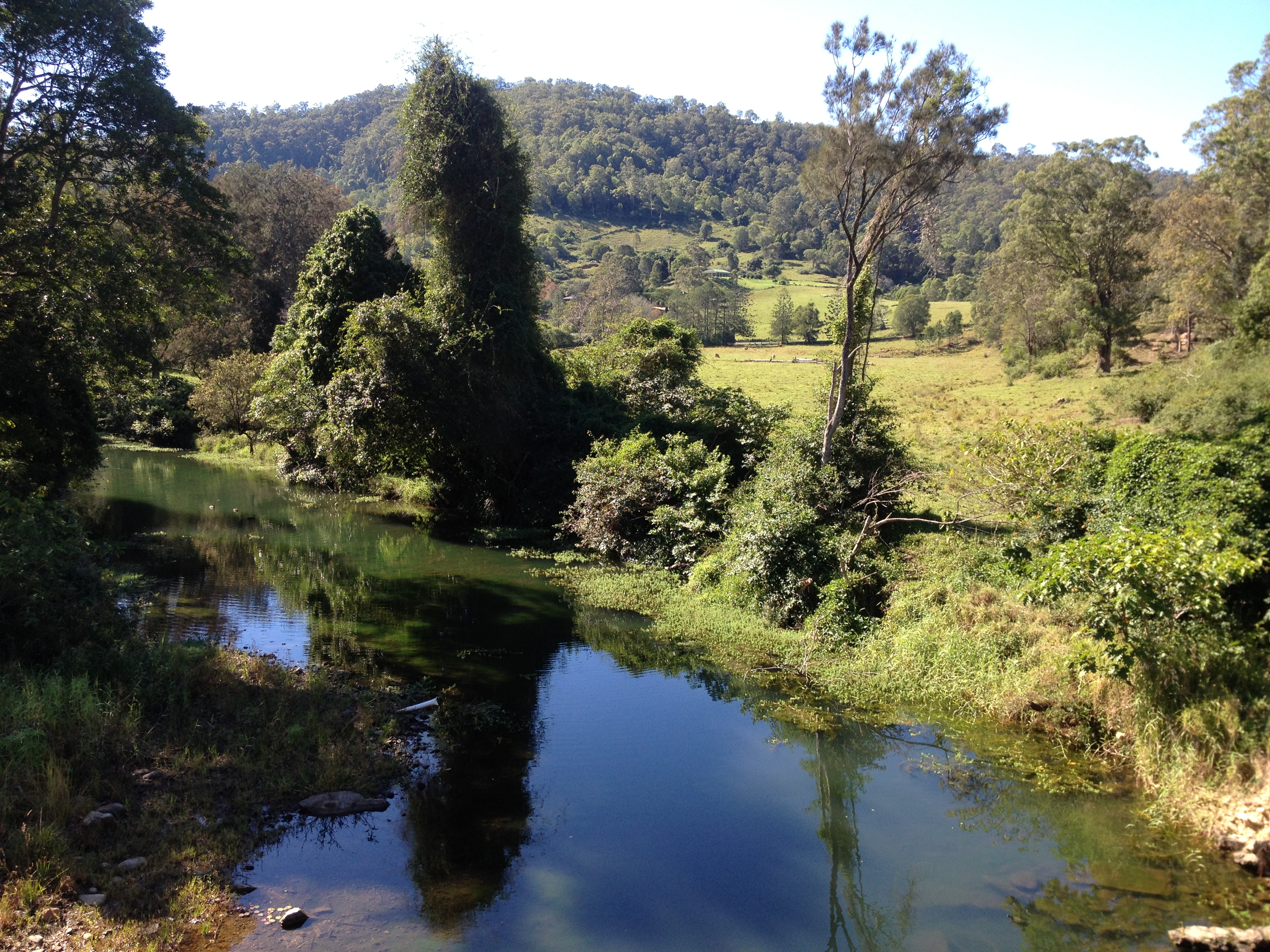
- Wongawallan Creek

- Interactive map of Wongawallan
- Coordinates: 27.8880°S 153.2375°E
- Country: Australia
- State: Queensland
- City: Gold Coast
- LGA: City of Gold Coast
- Location: 12.9 km (8.0 mi) NE of Tamborine Mountain; 13.2 km (8.2 mi) SW of Upper Coomera; 24.4 km (15.2 mi) NW of Southport; 27.7 km (17.2 mi) NW of Surfers Paradise; 67.8 km (42.1 mi) SE of Brisbane CBD

Government
  - State electorates: Coomera; Theodore
  - Federal division: Forde

Area
  - Total: 32.9 km^{2} (12.7 sq mi)

Population
  - Total: 1,415 (2021 census)
  - Density: 43.01/km^{2} (111.39/sq mi)
- Time zone: UTC+10:00 (AEST)
- Postcode: 4210
Suburbs around Wongawallan
Cedar Creek	Kingsholme	Willowvale
Cedar Creek	Wongawallan	Upper Coomera
Tamborine Mountain	Gunanaba	Maudsland

Wongawallan is a rural locality in the City of Gold Coast, Queensland, Australia. In the 2021 census, Wongawallan had a population of 1,415 people.

== Geography ==
Wongawallan is mountainous terrain with most farming and residential development occurring the creek valleys. The hilltops are largely undeveloped.

Mount Wongawallan is a mountain in the north-east of the locality (27.8672°S 153.255°E) rising to 378 metres (1,240 ft) above sea level.

The main creeks are Wongawallan Creek and Tamborine Creek. Tamborine Creek joins Wongawallan creek at 27°53′59″S 153°15′00″E close to Welch Pioneer Park. Wongawallan Creek is a tributary of the Coomera River; their confluence is in neighbouring Maudsland.

The Tamborine-Oxenford Road is the main road to and through the locality.

== History ==
The area was originally named Mount Goulburn after Henry Goulburn by surveyor Dixon. However, later it was renamed Wongawallan, believed to be an Aboriginal word where wonga means pigeon and walla means water.

However, it has been claimed that it was named after an Aboriginal man nicknamed "Peter" who killed John Wilkinson, a settler, at Wongawallan Creek in 1876., but contemporaneous newspaper reports of the death of Wilkinson only refer to the Aboriginal man as "Peter".

== Demographics ==
In the 2011 census, Wongawallan had a population of 1,103 people.

In the 2016 census, Wongawallan had a population of 1,273 people.

In the 2021 census, Wongawallan had a population of 1,415 people.

== Heritage listings ==
There are a number of heritage-listed sites in Wongawallan, including:

- Grave of Elizabeth Welch, Welch Pioneer Park, 881 Tamborine-Oxenford Road

== Education ==
There are no schools in Wongawallan. The nearest government primary schools are Highlands Reserve State School and Upper Coomera State College, both in neighbouring Upper Coomera to the east, and Tamborine Mountain State School in neighbouring Tamborine Mountain to the south-west. The nearest government secondary schools are Upper Coomera State College in neighbouring Upper Coomera to the east and Tamborine Mountain State High School in neighbouring Tamborine Mountain to the south-east.

== Amenities ==
There are a number of parks in the locality, including:

- Cresthill Drive Reserve (27.8806°S 153.2495°E)
- Eagle Heights Conservation Area (27.9160°S 153.2212°E)
- Gladrose Reserve (27.9090°S 153.2484°E)
- Hayes Park (27.8892°S 153.2239°E)
- Howard Creek Reserve (27.8612°S 153.2183°E)
- Lanes Park (27.8661°S 153.2352°E)
- Pinnacle Park (27.8873°S 153.2277°E)
- Solomon Lane Reserve (27.8703°S 153.2502°E)
- Tamborine Creek Reserve (27.8964°S 153.2105°E)
- Tamborine Oxenford Road Bend Reserve (27.8772°S 153.2145°E)
- Tamborine Recreation Reserve (27.8951°S 153.1993°E)
- Timberview Drive Reserve (27.8853°S 153.2198°E)
- Timberview Drive Park (27.8815°S 153.2301°E)
- Valley View Vista Park (27.8851°S 153.2312°E)
- Walter Park (27.8742°S 153.2508°E)
- Waterfall Drive Northern Park (27.8837°S 153.2280°E)
- Waterfall Drive Southern Park (27.8842°S 153.2271°E)
- Welch Pioneer Park (27.8970°S 153.2460°E)
- Wongawallan Conservation Area (27.8589°S 153.2375°E)
- Wongawallan Reserve (27.8687°S 153.2560°E)
- Wongawallan Road Reserve (27.8785°S 153.2548°E)
- Wongawallen Junction Reserve (27.8760°S 153.2270°E)
