= Youth system =

Sporting concept encompassing the development of young athletes

In sporting terminology, a youth system (or youth academy) is a youth investment program within a particular team or league, which develops and nurtures young talent in farm teams, with the vision of using them in the first team if they show enough potential. In contrast to most professional sports in the United States where the high school and collegiate system is responsible for developing young sports people, most football and basketball clubs, especially in Europe and Latin America, take responsibility for developing their own players of the future.

A subset of youth academies are referred to as elite academies, designated for teenagers and young adults. These academies typically have a higher cost of capital incurred for maintaining an optimal environment for practice as well as cups and other competitions that may be partaken.

Elite academies often have full time staff including but not limited to coaches, physiotherapists, office staff and other roles that assist in the operations of the academy. Rules of top academies are strict and unlike other association football clubs, most clubs will have strict travel rules and will not allow players to drive to and from matches on the same day if under the age of 21 due to fatigue levels and stress.

Underage players may sign youth contracts with the club or association that owns the elite academy. It is also common for elite academies to offer the ability to study in parallel with the academy training, such as is the case in for example the system of college sports in the United States. Schools may offer sports focused programmes in order to integrate their student experiences with the academies of affiliation.

== Youth academies ==
Youth systems attached exclusively to one club are often called youth academies. In a youth academy, a club will sign multiple players at a very young age and teach them football skills required to play at that club's level and style of football. Clubs are often restricted to recruiting locally based youngsters, but some larger clubs such as Arsenal, Real Madrid, Manchester United, and Chelsea have recruited foreign talent, leading to the formation of specialist recruiters such as the La Liga Youth Brokerage, which started in 2016.

Numerous European football clubs are recognized for their youth academies, which have produced many prominent international players. Prominent examples include Ajax and Feyenoord in the Netherlands, FC Barcelona, Atlético Madrid, and Real Madrid in Spain, Benfica, Sporting CP, and Porto in Portugal, Olympique Lyonnais and Paris Saint-Germain in France, Manchester United, Liverpool, Arsenal, and Chelsea in England, FC Bayern Munich, Borussia Dortmund, and Schalke 04 in Germany.

Other clubs, such as Brazilian teams Grêmio and São Paulo, Espanyol in Spain, Atalanta, Inter Milan, and AC Milan of Italy, and English clubs Leeds United, Middlesbrough, Watford, Aston Villa, and West Ham United, are also noted for their high level youth academies, even as smaller financial clubs. West Ham's youth academy, known as The Academy of Football, has produced many notable English talents that have gone on to play with Premier League clubs.

Another example is lower league clubs who have produced high quality players through the academy and sold them to keep the club running. A prime example of this is Crewe Alexandra who have, under Dario Gradi and his staff, nurtured players into high quality players such as Danny Murphy and Dean Ashton and sold them.

An alternative name for a youth academy is "Centre of Excellence". In English football, these terms have distinct meanings and are licensed and regulated by The Football Association and The Football League.

In 2020, Major League Rugby teams started forming youth academies.

In the Soviet Union, children-youth sports schools were used as youth systems. Financing of the Soviet youth system was conducted by clubs such as Dynamo Kyiv, Spartak Moscow, CSKA Moscow, and other clubs, and also through major industrial Soviet state enterprises such as PA Yuzhmash, Black Sea Shipping Company, Izhevsk Mechanical Plant, and other enterprises.

== Youth leagues ==
While similar to youth academies, youth leagues are built into a club competition rather than an individual club. However, the teams that play in these youth leagues (called farm teams) are generally attached to a larger senior club. The purpose of these leagues is to give young players experience in proper competition against other players that they will most likely end up playing with or against. The Premier League in England is known for having a large youth league attached to its senior clubs. In the forthcoming season the A-League in Australia will begin its own youth league.

Youth leagues are not just exclusive to football (soccer). The Australian Football League (AFL) has a youth league established underneath its senior league with no attachment to any senior club. The players that play in this competition are then chosen to play for senior clubs through the AFL draft. Basketball clubs in Europe follow the same format as their respective football (soccer) clubs, with youth tournaments in each country, as well as the Euroleague Basketball Next Generation Tournament, where the top 32 under-18 sides compete for the championship. Minor ice hockey and junior ice hockey serve an identical purpose for ice hockey and the National Hockey League (NHL). Historically, hockey followed a similar model to association football in that professional teams owned junior teams to develop youth talent (examples including the Montreal Junior Canadiens and Toronto Marlboros) to which they would retain territorial rights; this system was phased out in 1967 in favor of a draft system. To a certain extent, Little League Baseball serves a similar purpose for professional baseball, although the vast majority of development and recruitment comes at the high school level.

The National Football League operates two youth academies, one at Loughborough University in England and the other at A. B. Paterson College in Australia, with those academies designed mainly for international talent. The majority of the NFL's players, along with those of the neighboring Canadian Football League, are developed predominantly through the educational system, first with high school football and then college football (university football in Canada). Canada also has its own junior football system similar to hockey's. Neither Major League Baseball nor the National Basketball Association have a youth system. Basketball players are typically developed and recruited straight out of high school, although the National Basketball Association requires at least one year out of high school to be eligible to play. College basketball is also a source of players for the NBA and other professional leagues.

MLS Next (stylized in all caps) is a system of youth soccer leagues that are managed, organized and controlled by Major League Soccer. It was introduced by the league in 2020. The system was introduced in mid 2020 and will be active for the first time during the 2020–21 season. It is a successor to the U.S. Soccer Development Academy. The system covers the under-13, under-14, under-15, under-16, under-17, and under-19 age groups.

== See also ==
- Minor league
- Reserve team
- Draft (sport)
- Cantera
