= Laurel Hill Farmhouse =

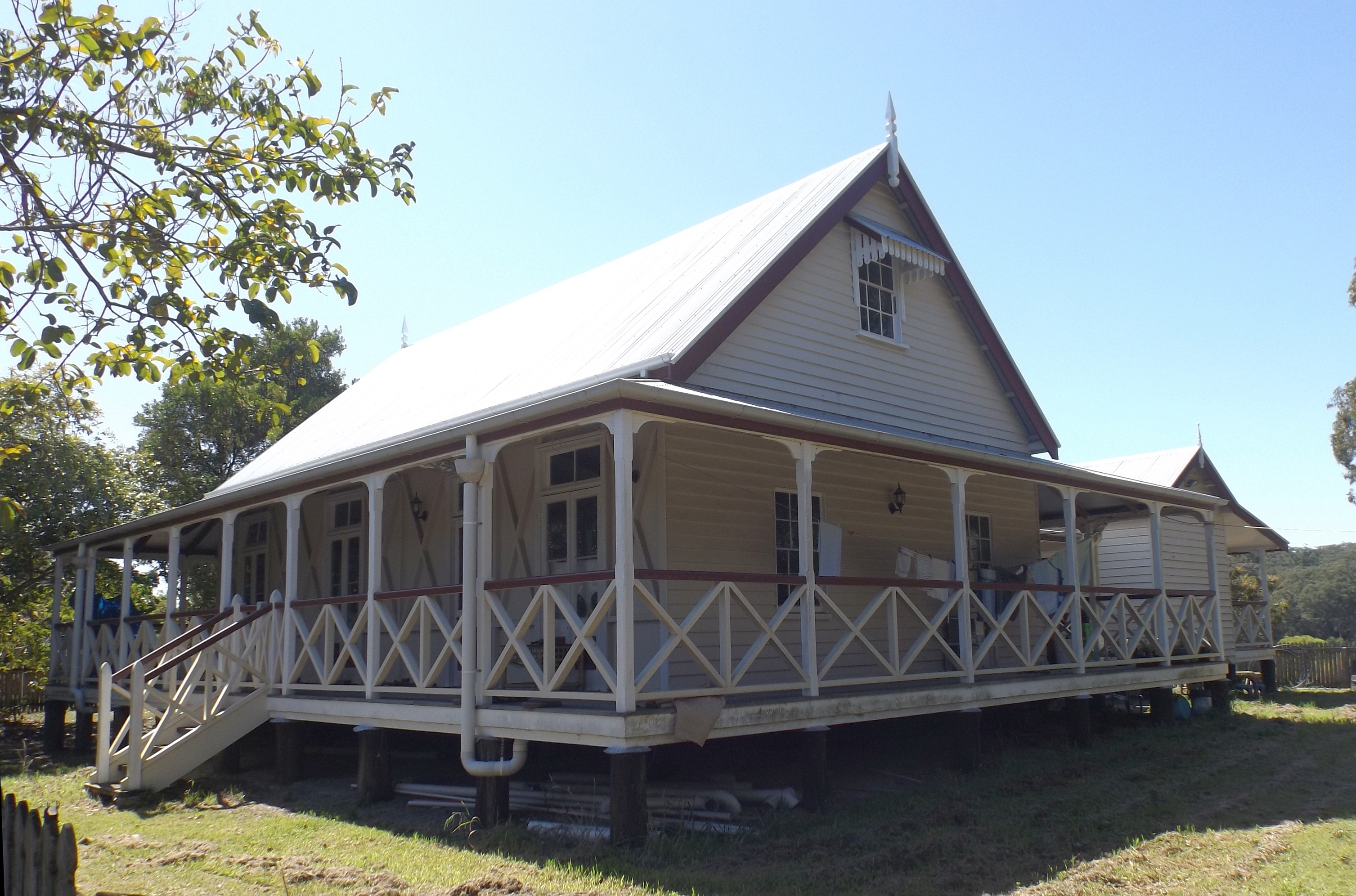
- Farmhouse in 2015

- Location within Queensland Location within Australia
- 27.8437°S 153.2717°E
- Location: 105 Ruffles Road, Willow Vale, City of Gold Coast, Queensland, Australia

History
- Design period: 1870s–1890s (late 19th century)
- Built: 1883–1884
- Built for: William Doherty

Queensland Heritage Register
- Official name: Laurel Hill Farmhouse
- Type: state heritage (built)
- Designated: 1 December 1997
- Reference no.: 601936
- Significant period: 1880s–1920s (fabric); 1880s–1940s, 1897 (historical)
- Significant components: trees/plantings, kitchen/kitchen house, garden/grounds, farmhouse
- Builders: Alexander Fortune

Laurel Hill Farmhouse is a heritage-listed farm house at 105 Ruffles Road, Willow Vale, City of Gold Coast, Queensland, Australia. It was built from 1883 to 1884 by Alexander Fortune for William Doherty. It was added to the Queensland Heritage Register on 1 December 1997.

== History ==
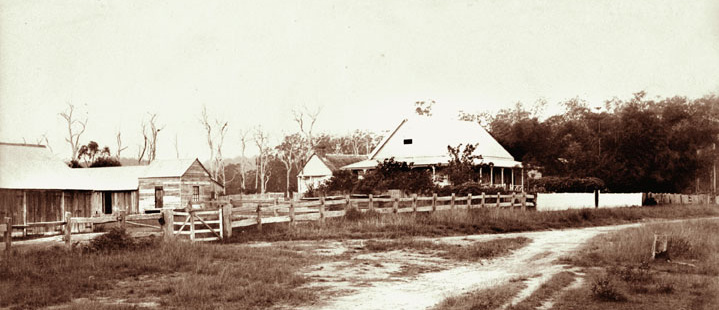
Laurel Hill Farmhouse, 1897

Laurel Hill Farmhouse, a single-storeyed timber farm house with attic, was erected in 1883–1884 for Pimpama arrowroot grower and manufacturer, William Doherty. The builder was Alexander Fortune of Coomera. At the time, Laurel Hill Farmhouse was considered the finest residence in Pimpama district, and in 1897 was photographed by the Queensland Lands Department as an example of a successful Queensland selector's home.

Much of the Pimpama district had been taken up in the 1850s by William Duckett White of Beau Desert Station, who leased 20,000 acres (8,100 ha) between the Logan and Coomera Rivers, including upper Hotham Creek (a tributary of Pimpama River), as Pimpama run. A small settlement was established on Pimpama River c. 1860, but the site was abandoned within a few years in preference to Hotham Creek. Much of Pimpama run was thrown open for selection from April 1869, and White forfeited his remaining leasehold on Pimpama from 1 January 1870. The private subdivision and sale in February 1870 of town and farm lots at the junction of the Pimpama River and Hotham Creek, consolidated Pimpama township and initiated a small farming community of predominantly Irish settlers.

In the 1860s, farmers along the Pimpama River experimented firstly with cotton growing, then with sugar, both of which initially were dependent on South Pacific Islands labour. By December 1876 the principal Pimpama sugar plantations (Ormeau, Malungmavel, Pimpama and Yahwulpah) had ceased production, and were devoted either to cattle or arrowroot, but some smaller farms in the district continued with sugar growing for several decades.

The Pimpama selectors of the 1870s, searching for a new commercial crop, discovered that the climate, soil, and abundance of pure water in the Pimpama district were ideal for the cultivation and manufacture of arrowroot. Arrowroot gave about the same return as maize or potatoes, but was more frost, drought and flood resistant. The first commercial arrowroot in Pimpama was grown in the late 1860s, and the Lahey family, who moved to Pimpama in 1870 and eventually took up Sunnyside, adjoining William Doherty on Hotham Creek, went into arrowroot cultivation on a large scale, inventing a mechanical processing method which revolutionised the production of arrowroot, and marketing arrowroot under their own brand. By 1884, arrowroot was widely grown in the Pimpama and Coomera districts, and a number of new manufacturing plants were being established.

Most of the selections along upper Hotham Creek were surveyed in 1871, but not proclaimed for selection until August 1874. In the interim, many farmers were "squatting" on these selections, with no guarantee that they would ultimately secure the land as leasehold.

Irish-born settlers William Doherty and his wife Eliza Fannon had arrived in Queensland by September 1867. It appears that they were resident in Brisbane until November 1869 at least, but had moved to the Pimpama district by August 1870, when William Doherty signed a local petition calling for a provisional school to be established in the area. It is not known where in Pimpama the Doherty family lived at this period, but William Doherty worked on a number of local sugar plantations and farms before taking up his own selections in the mid-1870s.

In October 1874, Doherty selected portion 21, parish of Pimpama (158 acres (64 ha) of second class pastoral land on Hotham Creek, on which Laurel Hill Farmhouse was later built). The block already contained some improvements, including a slab barn and a small humpy and about 12 acres (4.9 ha) of scrub cleared and partly under cultivation, for which Doherty paid £20, and was issued with a conditional lease on the property for 10 years from 1 January 1875. At the same time he selected the adjoining portion 31 with 135 acres (55 ha), on which existing improvements comprised a bark-roofed barn, a small slab house, some cleared scrub and a small stockyard. It appears that the Dohertys resided on portion 31 from October 1874 until mid-1879, when they moved to portion 21. In 1879, Doherty also acquired the lease to portion 151, an 84-acre block which abutted the eastern boundary of portion 21.

In January 1884 he obtained title to portions 21 & 31, and embarked on substantial improvements to the property, which he had named Laurel Hill. A fine new house, erected for the Dohertys by Coomera builder Alexander Fortune, was completed by late January 1884. (This is understood to be the existing Laurel Hill Farmhouse.) Fortune, resident in the Coomera district by 1872, was a carpenter by trade, and had erected Coomera State School and an Anglican church at Upper Coomera.

At Laurel Hill, William Doherty raised cattle and grew various crops. By 1884 he had between 40 and 50 acres (20 ha) under arrowroot, and erected his own factory in the first half of the year. Remnants of this mill survive. Before the turn of the century, he purchased Pimpama Plantation at Ormeau, (approximately 1,150 acres (470 ha) which he used for grazing purposes), and c. 1901 acquired Sunnyside, the Lahey family's substantial arrowroot plantation adjacent to Laurel Hill on Hotham Creek. Following William Doherty's death in 1904, the properties were divided between his three sons: Laurel Hill went to William Alexander (Alex), Sunnyside (renamed Willowvale by the Dohertys) to Thomas, and Pimpama to Robert.

By 1908, Queensland farmers on about a dozen farms in the Yatala, Pimpama, Ormeau and Nerang districts, were supplying almost the whole of the arrowroot used in Australia. Doherty Brothers of Hotham Creek and Robert Doherty of Ormeau, with together approximately 100 acres (40 ha) under arrowroot (or 50% of the total 200 acres (81 ha) under arrowroot in these districts), were among the largest arrowroot growers/producers in Australia. The Willowvale arrowroot mill was moved further downstream on Hotham Creek, closer to the Pacific Highway at Pimpama, and continued production until the mid-1930s. Alex Doherty at Laurel Hill turned to dairying in the early 1920s before retiring to the Gold Coast c. 1947. Subsequently the property was purchased by the Miles family of Pimpama, with title to Laurel Hill transferred in 1950. Members of this family resided in the house until mid-October 1997.

The Doherty family were prominent members of the local community, involved in church and civic affairs. William Doherty was a trustee of Pimpama School of Arts and served as a councillor on Coomera Divisional Board from c. 1887 to c. 1889. His son Thomas later became chairman of Coomera Shire.

Some changes to the farmhouse were made during the Doherty family's occupation. There is evidence of minor re-arrangement of internal partition walls, and the staircase to the attic has been removed and the stairwell enclosed, possibly in the 1920s. The ceiling linings in several of the rooms may date to the 1920s also. The original kitchen wing reputedly burnt down in the late 1920s, and was replaced with the present kitchen building.

== Description ==
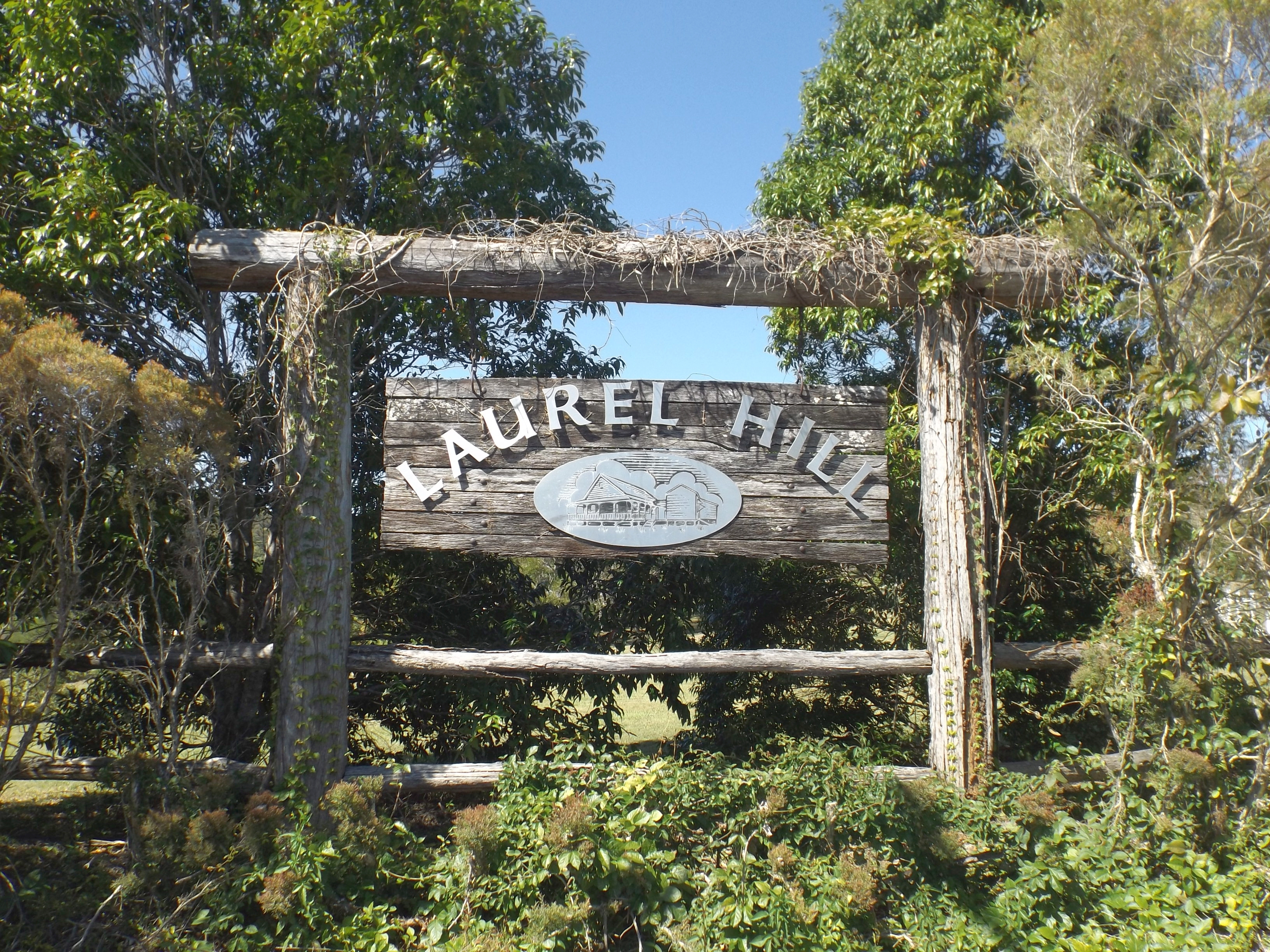
Signage

Laurel Hill Farmhouse, a single-storeyed weatherboard residence with a corrugated iron gable roof and timber stumps, is located fronting Ruffles Road to the northwest.

The residence has verandahs to four sides, with a separate kitchen wing at the rear connected via a covered landing. Original attic windows, one to each gable end, have been infilled with weatherboard.

The verandah has a corrugated iron skillion roof, with a timber-lined ceiling (partially removed) and timber posts, capitals and brackets. Sections of the verandah have deteriorated and partially collapsed, and only a few sections of balustrading, consisting of dowel balusters and timber handrail, survive. The building has weatherboard cladding to the side and rear walls, and a single-skin externally cross-braced wall to the front verandah. The main entrance, consisting of a panelled timber door and fanlight, opens off the front verandah and is flanked by two French doors with fanlights on the northern side and a French door and fanlight on the southern side. Multi-pane sash windows open to the side and rear verandahs, and a timber door opens from the living area to the south-east verandah and covered landing, and a second door with fanlight opens to the north-east verandah.

The kitchen wing consists of an unpainted weatherboard structure with a corrugated iron gable roof and timber stumps, with a corrugated iron lean-to addition at the rear. This structure has sash windows to the main section, with corrugated iron and timber batten hoods, and hopper and louvred windows to the lean-to. A timber door opens to a covered landing to the northwest, and a second door opens to the southeast with timber steps to ground level.

Internally, the residence has a large living area facing the southeast and northeast verandahs, with two bedrooms to the southwest and two bedrooms to the northwest. Ceilings and walls are unpainted, and the original attic space has been closed and the access stair removed. The ceiling of the living space has been altered and now consists of plywood sheeting with timber battens, and some internal walls may have been altered and partially re-lined. Door heads are not of a uniform height, and the main bedroom has French doors opening from the central hallway, also suggesting some alteration to internal walls. The exterior walls have wide horizontal boarding, and the internal walls have vertical boarding. The bedroom ceilings vary, with some comprising raked cornices with joists supporting floorboards for the attic above, and others finished with timber boarding.

Internally, the kitchen wing has unpainted ceilings and walls. The main section contains a dining area and bathroom, and has vertically boarded walls and a boarded ceiling. The rear lean-to addition houses the kitchen with a stove recess at the northern end.

The building's immediate surrounds include overgrown gardens to the northwest fronting Ruffles Road, with the remains of a rock garden to the north of the house. There are also a number of large trees to the north and south, and the remains of a partially demolished shed to the northeast.

== Heritage listing ==
Laurel Hill Farmhouse was listed on the Queensland Heritage Register on 1 December 1997 having satisfied the following criteria.

The place is important in demonstrating the evolution or pattern of Queensland's history.

Laurel Hill Farmhouse survives as an important illustration of the pattern of Queensland's history, demonstrating the success of arrowroot growing and manufacturing in the Pimpama district in the late 19th and early 20th centuries, when this Queensland region supplied almost the whole of the arrowroot used in Australia. As early as 1897, the house was considered illustrative of what the Queensland land selection system could achieve, and was promoted officially as the ideal type of settler's residence.

The place demonstrates rare, uncommon or endangered aspects of Queensland's cultural heritage.

It is rare to find an early 1880s farm house as intact as this on the Gold Coast hinterland, which has experienced enormous pressure for development in the last quarter of the 20th century.

The place has potential to yield information that will contribute to an understanding of Queensland's history.

The place has potential to provide important information about rural timber building techniques of the early 1880s, and about the types of materials used. The c. 1920s kitchen wing appears to have been constructed to much the same footprint as the earlier building it replaced, survives very intact, and in materials and form complements the 1880s building.

The place is important in demonstrating the principal characteristics of a particular class of cultural places.

Laurel Hill Farmhouse survives reasonably intact, and is important in illustrating the principal characteristics of an early 1880s settler's farm house with unpainted interior and original joinery.

The place has a strong or special association with a particular community or cultural group for social, cultural or spiritual reasons.

The place is valued by the local community for its long association with the Doherty family and their work in the local community, and for its illustration of pioneering achievement. The Willowvale/Pimpama community has a number of families descended from the first European settlers in the area, who value Laurel Hill Farmhouse as an important link with the past.
