= Somerset College =

School in Mudgeeraba, Queensland, Australia

Location
- Mudgeeraba, Gold Coast, Queensland; Australia; 28°05′33″S 153°22′28″E

Information
- Type: Independent, day, co-educational
- Motto: Latin: Deo confidimus (In God we trust)
- Denomination: Non-denominational
- Established: 1983
- Founder: Clifford Rodney Wells
- Chairman: Tony Hickey
- Headmaster: Chris Ivey
- Staff: 180+
- Enrollment: 1500
- Colours: Navy blue, forest green and white
- Slogan: Personal Success, Global Outlook
- Publication: The Times; Inkspot; The Somersetonian
- Affiliation: Associated Private Schools
- Website: somerset.qld.edu.au

Somerset College is an independent, non-denominational Christian day school located in Mudgeeraba, Queensland, Australia. Established in 1983, the college has a non-selective enrolment policy and caters for approximately 1480 students from Pre-Prep to Year 12. Originally constructed in rural farmland in the Gold Coast hinterland, the countryside surrounding the campus has undergone significant urban development since the school's foundation.

The college is particularly noted for its academic excellence, rating highly in state and national rankings. Since 1997, Somerset is one of only two Queensland schools where the most common OP score among students has been 1. In 2014, 56.2% of its Year 12 students achieved an OP 1–5, the second highest percentage of any graduating class in Queensland. The college has also offered the IB Diploma for students since 1999. The Celebration of Literature, Australia's largest writers festival for children and young adults, is hosted by the college every March.

Somerset is affiliated with the Independent Primary School Heads of Australia (IPSHA), the Association of Heads of Independent Schools of Australia (AHISA), Independent Schools Queensland (ISQ) and is a founding member of the Associated Private Schools of Queensland (APS).

== History ==
Somerset College was officially opened on 16 October 1983 by Queensland Premier Joh Bjelke-Petersen. Its name is based on the fact the school is located on Somerset Drive, on a location formerly used for dairy farming . Its logo features a Moreton Bay fig tree, which has been on the campus since the school's foundation.

The school's founding principal was Clifford Rodney (Rod) Wells. In 1980, Wells moved to the Gold Coast from Sydney with his wife, singer Roslyn (Dunbar) Wells, and obtained farmland belonging to property developer John Jenkins for a $1 deposit. For 12 months, Wells conducted feasibility studies, had meetings with the Queensland Education Department and held public meetings to establish financial, educational and community support. In 1981, a small group was formed as the first steering committee.

The first buildings opened on 27 January 1983 with 158 students in classes from Year 1 to Year 8. Staff, parents and students helped with the landscaping and laying of turf. The Latin phrase "Deo Confidimus" ("In God, we trust") was chosen as the school motto.

By term four of 1983, enrolments had already grown to 248, of which 189 were in the Junior School. This rapid growth proved the need for independent schools on the Gold Coast and secured the college's future.

Building projects continued well into the late 1980s. In 1986 Barry Arnison OAM, a foundation staff member and deputy headmaster, was appointed headmaster. He oversaw the first graduating class of Year 12 students in 1987 as well as most of the buildings and facilities that stand today including the Arnison Building named in his honour.

Upon Arnison's retirement, Craig Bassingthwaighte was appointed headmaster in 2009. In 2015, the first Pre-Prep students were admitted into the college. New building developments include the Early Learning Precinct (opened 2009), the Knowledge and Information Precinct (opened 2012), the Student Services Hub for the Senior School (opened 2014) and the new athletic facilities, including a gym, indoor hardwood floor courts, outdoor volleyball courts, a ten-lane 400m athletics track as well as new grandstands and clubhouses for the existing pool and tennis complex. Following, Bassingthwaighte’s retirement in 2024, Chris Ivey was appointed headmaster, commencing 2025.

== H_{2}O: Just Add Water ==
The school was also used to record the television serial: H_{2}O: Just Add Water, on behalf of Jonathan M. Shiff Productions. According to the television series, it is the official school of the four protagonists: Emma, Rikki, Cleo and Bella. As well as the school of the other protagonists.

The school was used for all three seasons.

== Structure ==
The school is divided into the Junior School (Pre Prep–Year 6) and the Senior School (Years 7–12). Both have their separate administration centres with their respective heads being the Head of Junior School and Head of Senior School.

The Founders of Somerset College formed the initial School Council which was renamed the College Board in 2011. Somerset College is a separately incorporated not for profit company limited by guarantee. The College Board has responsibility for the governance of Somerset College in finances, buildings and grounds, and policy. Its most important task is to appoint the Headmaster to manage the operations of the college. The Board discharges its responsibilities through its regular meetings, including its Committees, and by supporting and monitoring the performance of the Headmaster. The chairs of the board are mostly parents, former parents or alumni. The current Chair of the College Board is Tony Hickey.

The College Leadership Team (CLT) is made up of key staff members including the Headmaster, Deputy Headmaster, chief operating officer, Head of Senior School, Head of Junior School, Dean of Information Technology, Dean of Middle Years, Dean of Teaching and Learning, Dean of Activities and the Dean of Admissions. They are responsible for the key decisions surrounding the day-to-day running of the college.

== Curriculum ==
Somerset College offers all three International Baccalaureate programs. The Primary Years Programme (PYP) forms the basis of the curriculum from Pre-Prep to Year 5, providing the essential building blocks of literacy and numeracy with the culminating experience of the PYP Exhibition. The Middle Years Programme (MYP) from Years 6–10 focuses on developing students who are self-directed, self-regulated, independent and autonomous learners. Service requirements provide opportunities for students to be active members of the greater community and is an essential part of the life at Somerset. In Years 11 and 12, students choose either the IB Diploma Programme or Queensland Certificate of Education both of which allow for tertiary entrance. In June 2006, the college hosted the Asia-Pacific International Baccalaureate conference. Despite the school being certified to offer the IB Diploma Programme, few students choose it, leading to the programme rarely being offered.

== Houses ==
All students and most teaching staff at the college are divided up into 5 different houses, each named after prominent families in the Mudgeeraba area.

House	Mascot	Motto	Head of House
Andrews (gold)	Lion	A Heart of Gold	Hayden Volzke
Franklin (purple)	Frilled neck lizard	Nil Sed Optima (Latin for "Nothing but the Best")	Eleanor Amores
Laver (green)	Eagle	We Fly on Wings of Eagles	Brent Harrison
Starkey (red)	Unicorn	Unity is Strength	Meisha Napoles
Veivers (blue)	Seagull	Striving for Success	Rheanna Dougherty

== International Baccalaureate ==
Somerset College is one of three International Baccalaureate World Schools on the Gold Coast accredited to offer the IB Diploma Programme. It also offers the IB Middle Years Programme (MYP) and the IB Primary Years Programme (PYP), for which it received accreditation in 2006. In June 2006, the college hosted the Asia-Pacific International Baccalaureate Conference.

== Events ==
Each year in mid-March, Somerset College hosts its annual Celebration of Literature. The three-day festival features notable authors and poets from around Australia, and attracts around 20,000 school student and adult participants. Past visiting authors have included: Douglas Adams, Paul Jennings, Geoffrey McSkimming, Kate Forsyth, Andy Griffiths, Andrew Daddo, Gretel Killeen and Terry Denton.

== Programs ==
Somerset College's outdoor education curriculum includes camps for students in Years 4 to 11.

Students in the Senior School from Year 9 and above are encouraged to take part in the student exchange programs. Students studying German are able to visit Germany every two years (on the odd years students host German students). Students studying Japanese visit Japan every two year. The Italian trip is available to Year 11 students undertaking ab initio Italian and takes place in the summer holidays before beginning Year 12. The group travels around Italy visiting many historic landmarks and students stay with a host family and attend their billet's school for a couple of weeks.

There is also an annual ski trip, typically held in early September, where any student from the Senior School is able to visit Queenstown, New Zealand for one week.

== Sports ==
For most sports Somerset College competes as part of the Associated Private Schools (APS), a league of independent schools in the Gold Coast area. Competitive sports are generally split between summer and winter season, with the notable exception of rowing (which operates year-round). Recreational sports are also generally offered in both semesters. Swimming, cross-country and athletics carnivals are held each year at both an inter-house and inter-school level, and are major fixtures of the school sporting calendar.

Somerset sport teams are nicknamed the Spartans, and the college mascot Martin 'Marty' the Spartan can often be seen at sporting events.

=== Winter sports ===
- Rugby union
- Netball
- Soccer
- Hockey
- Volleyball
- Tennis

=== Summer sports ===
- Basketball
- Australian rules football
- Touch football
- Cricket
- Water polo
- Softball
- Pickleball

=== Recreational sports ===
- Golf
- Cycling
- Sailing
- Rehabilitation

=== Major APS carnivals ===
- Swimming
- Cross-country
- Athletics

== Notable alumni ==
=== Business and politics ===
- Hermann Vorster – Queensland Member of Parliament (Burleigh)

=== Entertainment ===
- Conrad Coleby
- Sophie Monk, singer and actress
- Ryan Johnson, actor
- Ian Peres, Wolfmother band member
- Margot Robbie, actress and producer

=== Media ===
- Sara Groen, former Saturday Disney host and Seven News Sydney weather presenter
- Wendy Kingston, Nine News reporter and presenter

=== Sports ===
Name	Sport	Top-level team/affiliation
Alex Beck	Athletics	Australia
Ben Hudson	Australian rules football	Adelaide, Western Bulldogs, Brisbane, Collingwood
Sara Carrigan	Cycling	Australia
Bryce Lindores	Cycling	Australia
Nathan Eyres-Brown	Rugby union	Reds, Australia Sevens, Farul Constanţa
Joanna Fargus	Swimming	Great Britain
