= Emmanuel College, Gold Coast =

Coordinates: 28.014°S 153.369°E

Emmanuel College Gold Coast

Location
- 17 Birmingham Rd; Carrara; Queensland, 4211; Australia

Information
- Type: Independent School
- Motto: To Know, To Serve
- Established: 1984
- Principal: Daniel Brown
- Enrolment: Junior School – 754; Senior School – 887; Total – 1641 (as of 2023)
- Colours: Navy blue, light blue and gold.
- Affiliation: Associated Private Schools
- Website: emmanuel.qld.edu.au

Emmanuel College is an independent, co-educational, multi-denominational Christian school in the suburb of Carrara on the Gold Coast, Queensland, Australia. The college caters to students from Preparatory through to Year 12 and there is also an affiliated on-campus kindergarten, Little e's. Emmanuel College is privately owned and operated and is registered with the Australian Securities and Investments Commission as a not-for-profit corporation.

== History and campus development ==
Emmanuel College was officially opened on 30 January 1985. Initially, the college catered only for high school students in Years 8 and 9, with higher years added in subsequent years. In January 1989 a primary school opened with more than 150 students. In the early years, staff and students were housed in mobile structures, but a construction program in the following decade replaced all the temporary structures with permanent ones.

Major projects included the completion of an administration building, the Graham Leo library, information technology centres and an aquatic centre featuring a 25-metre swimming pool and an enclosed, modern learn-to-swim pool facility. Later structures included a Performing Arts centre, a sports building featuring a gymnasium, a multi-purpose basketball and tennis court complex, an Early Years (Prep – Year 3) Centre with play area, and a Hospitality Centre. In 2007 a new science block, the John Spence Centre, was built comprising laboratories, offices and general classrooms. All the school's rooms are air-conditioned and most of the classrooms have either interactive whiteboards or Commboxes.

In recent years, the Graham Leo Library has been extended, a Year 7 centre with a specialist music room has been built and the central courtyard of the college, Chapel Court, was developed. In 2012, The Emmanuel Theatre was opened. This tiered, 450-seat facility has an operable orchestra lift, a full fly tower and tuition rooms. The Junior School play areas developed in 2013 include a tunnel, a maze, elevated walkways, a citrus grove and other creative play spaces that are adjacent to 'The Shed', a covered outdoor learning area. A heated indoor learn-to-swim pool was opened in 2014 and a Junior School Design and Technology, Art and Administration building with new ablution facilities for Junior School students was opened on 7 February 2015. A student-led help and technical services facility within the Library, the Tech Bar, was opened in 2015 and the Colin Clark Centre for STEM and Social Innovation was established. B Block was renamed, the David Bewley Centre and a new Senior School building, the Neville Bonner Centre, was opened in June 2019. The building features eight learning spaces, three laboratories, a staff room and a multi-purpose room.

Emmanuel College now serves almost 1600 students and they compete internally in various inter-house activities as members of one of the four houses, namely, Wycliffe, Wesley, Luther and Taylor.

== Chapel ==
In December 1938, tenders were called to construct a Methodist Church in Surfers Paradise, designed by architect W. J. E. Kerrison. It was the last building approved in Surfers Paradise before the outbreak of World War II. It was hoped that the church would open at Easter in 1939. However, insufficient funds delayed the construction of the church. On Saturday 23 October 1940, the stump-capping ceremony was finally held in Clifford Street. On Saturday 14 December 1940, the Surfers Paradise Methodist Church was officially opened by Reverend Wilfred Slater, the President of the Methodist Conference, becoming Clifford Street Uniting Church In 1977 as part of the amalgamation that created the Uniting Church in Australia . The church celebrated its 50th anniversary in December 1990. An amalgamation of the Uniting Church congregations on the Gold Coast resulted in the closure of the Clifford Street church, which was then relocated to Emmanuel College to serve as the chapel. It was officially dedicated as the Emmanuel College Chapel on 7 July 1991. The chapel features a series of stained glass windows.

== Extracurricular activities ==
Academic extracurricular activities include the gifted and talented programs, participation in Mathematics, English, Science, Writing, Computing and Spelling competitions, Olympiads, 'Day of Excellence', Writers Cup, one-on-one tuition and academic support programs.

Emmanuel College is a member of the Associated Private Schools (APS). APS Sporting competition includes swimming, athletics, cross-country, rugby union, netball, volleyball, soccer, hockey, softball, cricket, AFL (Australian Rules Football) and touch football. In 2019, seventy five Emmanuel College students represented South Coast, Queensland or Australia in both school or club sports with more than one half of these students participating at state or national level. Five students were individual Australian Champions in Triathlon, Freestyle Swimming, Open Water Swimming, Ironwomen and Race Walking. Two students were Australian representatives in Artistic Roller Skating and Baseball.

== Queensland and international connections ==
The service and connections programs of Emmanuel College see students visiting Effective Aid International programs in Thailand annually and the college actively supports Mission Educate in Mozambique. The service program also offers student community service 'Connect' trips to a number of southern Queensland towns including St George, Chinchilla, Thallon, Bollon, Dirranbandi, Nindigully and Goondiwindi.

== Notable alumni ==
=== Business ===
| Name | Position | Institution |
|---|---|---|
| Andrew Wilson | Chief Executive Officer | EA Games |

=== Sport ===
| Name | Sport | Top Level Team/Affiliation |
|---|---|---|
| Jasmyn Smith | Australian rules football (AFLW) | Gold Coast |
| Connor Nutting | Australian Rules football (AFL) | Gold Coast |
| Cameron McEvoy | Swimming | Australia, Olympic Games 2012,2016 |
| Hayley Raso | Association football | Australia |
