= Assisi Catholic College =

Location
- Upper Coomera, Queensland; Australia; 27°51′34.82″S 153°18′5.34″E

Information
- School type: Private
- Motto: 'Shape Your Tomorrow' (formerly Pax et Bonum)
- Religious affiliation: Roman Catholic
- Established: 2005
- Founder: Dora Luxton
- Principal: John Frare
- Grades: P–12
- Enrolment: 1,491 (2023)
- Campus type: airport
- Website: http://www.assisi.qld.edu.au

Assisi Catholic College is an independent, Roman Catholic, co-educational, P-12, school, located on the Gold Coast in Upper Coomera, Queensland, Australia. It is administered by the Queensland Catholic Education Commission, with an enrolment of 1,491 students and a teaching staff of 103, as of 2023. It was the first P-12, Catholic, co-educational, school to operate on the Gold Coast.

The Patron saints of the college are St Francis of Assisi and St Clare.

== History ==
The school opened on 27 January 2005, with 150 students in Prep to Year 3 and Year 8 students and 29 staff members. By August 2007, the college had students from Prep to Year 5 and Year 8 to Year 10 students. In 2009, the college ran all year levels from Prep to Year 12 for the first time.

It was one of five schools to open in Upper Coomera since the 1990s, due to significant growth within the region at the time.

The school was christened by Archbishop John Bathersby and opened by Anna Bligh, the education minister, on 10 July 2005.

The construction of the school library began in 2007 and was open by 2008.

Dora Luxton was the founding principle, and John Frare is the current Principle, taking over from his predecessor in 2024.

== Facilities ==
The name of the college; Assisi, came from a small town in the region of Umbria in Italy, due to two saints, St. Francis and St. Clare coming from the region. As such, most of the buildings in the college are named after places in Italy, which were also of importance to St Francis of Assisi – Greccio, Gubbio, Bonaventure, Perugia, San Damiano, Orvieto, Cortona, La Verna, Chiara, Sostegno, Umbria and Bertoldi. The exceptions are that of Bertoldi and the Pope Francis centre, the former of which is named after the architecture firm of the same name which is responsible for all the designs and construction work of the buildings, and the latter is in reference to Pope Francis, serving as the spiritual centre of the college.
