= Associated Private Schools =

Private school sporting association in Gold Coast, Queensland, Australia

- Headquarters: Gold Coast, Australia
- Members: 8 member schools A.B. Paterson College; All Saints Anglican School; Coomera Anglican College; Emmanuel College; King's Christian College; Somerset College; Saint Stephen's College; Trinity Lutheran College

The Associated Private Schools (APS) is a sporting association of eight private schools in Gold Coast, Queensland, Australia.

== Current member schools ==
School	Location	Founded	Denomination	Day/boarding	School colours	School nickname
A.B. Paterson College	Arundel	1990	Non-denominational	Day	Green and Gold	A.B.
All Saints Anglican School	Merrimac	1987	Anglican	Day and boarding	Navy blue, light blue and beige	ASAS, All Saints
Coomera Anglican College	Coomera	1997	Anglican	Day	Mint, white and dark blue	CAC
Emmanuel College	Carrara	1984	Multi-denominational	Day	Dark blue, blue and yellow	Emmanuel
King's Christian College	Reedy Creek	1980	Non-denominational	Day	Teal, blue and white	Kings
Somerset College	Mudgeeraba	1983	Non-denominational	Day	White, navy blue and forest green	Somerset
Saint Stephen's College	Coomera	1995	Anglican Catholic	Day	Orange, dark blue and white	SSC, Saint Stephen's
Trinity Lutheran College	Ashmore	1981	Lutheran	Day	Green, white and dark green	TLC, Trinity

== Sports ==
Winter (Terms 1-2)	Summer (Terms 3-4)
Hockey	Australian rules football
Netball (female only)	Basketball
Rugby (male only)	Cricket (male only)
Soccer	Softball (female only)
Tennis	Pickleball
Volleyball	Touch football
	Water polo

== Results ==
=== Australian rules football ===
==== Open Boys Finals ====
Year	Premiers	Score	Runners-up	Venue	Ref.
2018	Emmanuel	5.7 (37) – 1.2 (8)	Coomera	Metricon Stadium	
2019	Coomera	4.4 (28) – 4.3 (27)	All Saints	Metricon Stadium	

==== Open Girls Finals ====
Year	Premiers	Score	Runners-up	Venue	Ref.
2018	Somerset	5.4 (34) – 0.1 (1)	Coomera	Metricon Stadium	
2019	Coomera	6.3 (39) – 4.5 (29)	Somerset	Metricon Stadium	

=== Basketball ===
==== Open A Boys Finals ====
Year	Premiers	Score	Runners-up	Venue	Ref.
2018	Saint Stephen's	–	King's	A.B. Paterson College	

=== Netball ===
==== 1st VII Finals ====
Year	Premiers	Score	Runners-up	Venue	Ref.
2016	Coomera	30–25	Somerset	Coomera Anglican College	
2017	Somerset	55–26	Coomera	Coomera Indoor Sports Centre	
2018	Somerset	60–27	All Saints	–	
2019	Somerset	39–27	All Saints	–	
2020	Somerset	61–14	All Saints	Trinity Lutheran College	
2021	Somerset	50–35	Coomera	Somerset College	
2022	-	–	-	-	
2021	Somerset	52–35	King's	-	

=== Rugby ===
==== 1st XV Finals ====
Year	Premiers	Score	Runners-up	Venue	Ref.
2015	All Saints	29–3	Somerset	Bond University	
2016	All Saints	15–12	Somerset	Bond University	
2017	Somerset	22–19	All Saints	Bond University	
2018	Somerset	21–5	King's	Bond University	
2019	All Saints; Somerset	17–17 (Note: The 2019 APS Rugby Grand Final ended in a 17–17 draw which meant Somerset and All Saints held the trophy together for a shared premiership.)	–	Bond University	
2021	Somerset	14–10	King's	Bond University	
2022	King's	31–14	Somerset	Bond University	
2023	King's	26–18	Emmanuel	Bond University	
2024	Somerset	17–12	King's	Bond University	
2025	Somerset	22-21	King's	Bond University	
2026	King's	25-24	Somerset	Bond University	

=== Water Polo ===
==== Open A Boys Finals ====
Year	Premiers	Score	Runners-up	Venue	Ref.
2020	Trinity	10–2	Emmanuel	Trinity Lutheran College	
2021	Trinity	20–3	All Saints	Trinity Lutheran College	

== See also ==
- List of schools in Gold Coast, Queensland
