= Upper Coomera, Queensland =

Upper Coomera
- Suburb
- An aerial shot of Coomera and Upper Coomera looking towards Moreton Bay and the Pacific Ocean

- Interactive map of Upper Coomera
- Coordinates: 27.8786°S 153.2861°E
- Country: Australia
- State: Queensland
- City: Gold Coast
- LGA: City of Gold Coast
- Location: 20.6 km (12.8 mi) NNW of Southport; 23.9 km (14.9 mi) NNW of Surfers Paradise; 55.5 km (34.5 mi) SE of Brisbane; 51 km (32 mi) NW of Tweed Heads
- Established: 1900s

Government
  - State electorates: Coomera; Theodore
  - Federal division: Forde

Area
  - Total: 23.8 km^{2} (9.2 sq mi)
- Elevation: 20 m (66 ft)

Population
  - Total: 27,180 (SAL 2021)
- Time zone: UTC+10:00 (AEST)
- Postcode: 4209
Suburbs around Upper Coomera
Willow Vale	Pimpama	Coomera
Wongawallan	Upper Coomera	Coomera
Maudsland	Oxenford	Helensvale

Upper Coomera is a suburb in the City of Gold Coast, Queensland, Australia. In the 2021 census, Upper Coomera had a population of 27,180 people.

== Geography ==
Upper Coomera is located on the northern side of the Gold Coast on the western side of the M1 Pacific Motorway. It borders Willow Vale in the north, the Coomera River on the south which separates it from Oxenford and the Pacific Highway on the east which separates it from Coomera. Tamborine-Oxenford Road (State Route 95) runs through from south-west to south-east.

Upper Coomera and Coomera have long been the main centre of urban development on the Gold Coast and are considered to be, along with Southport and Robina, one of the Gold Coast's three urban centres. Upper Coomera is a heavily suburbanised suburb consisting of many large residential developments and commercial centres. Despite already being heavily developed and having a large population, Upper Coomera is predicted by both the Queensland Government and Gold Coast City Council to grow and develop at an exponential rate well into the next decade. Upper Coomera is a popular place of residence for dual-city commuters as it is placed roughly halfway between the central commercial districts of Southport and Beenleigh and within reasonable travelling distance to Brisbane CBD.

== History ==
The name Coomera comes from the Yugambeh word kumera, a species of wattle.

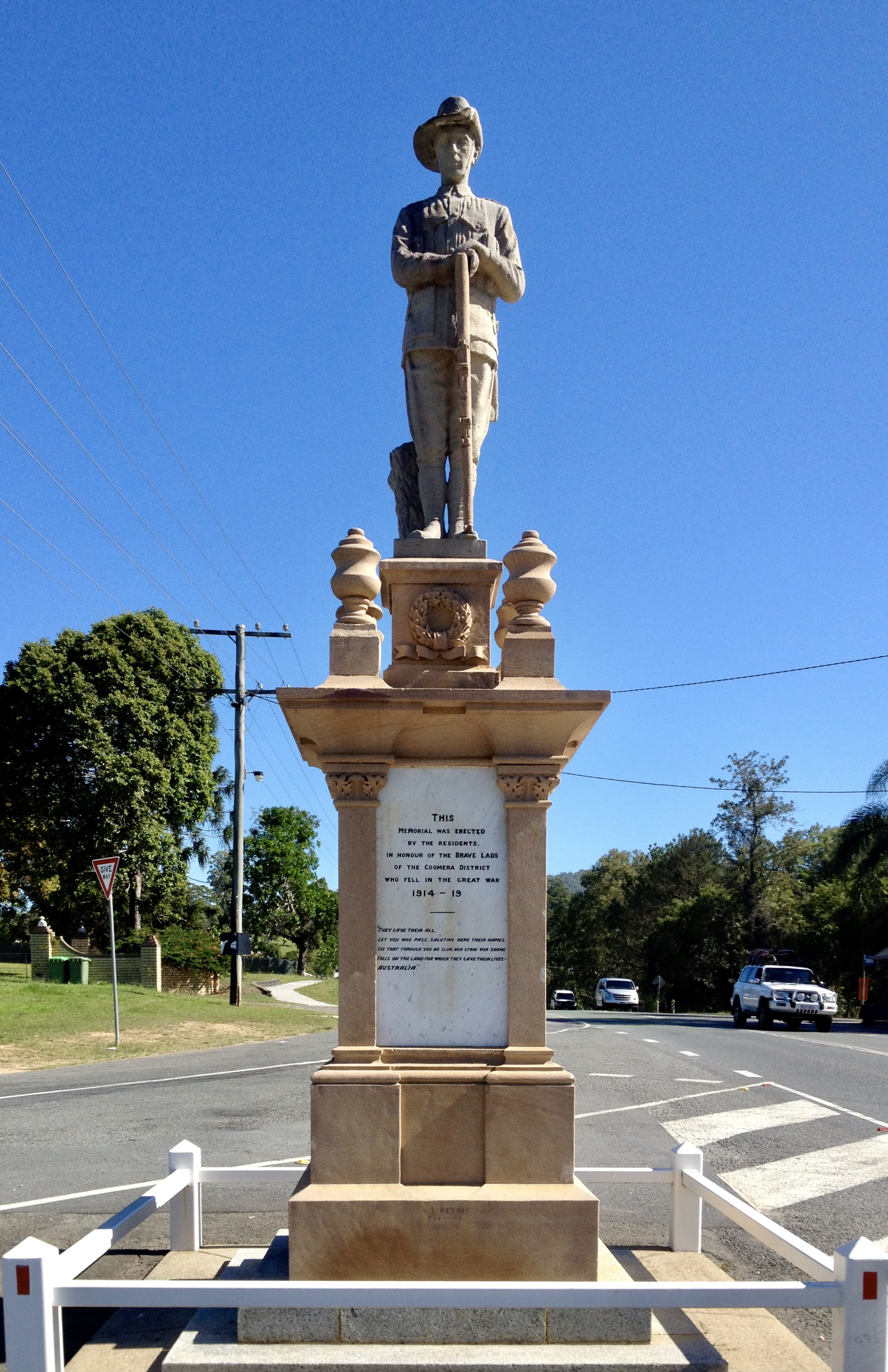
Upper Coomera War Memorial

In 1864, the British surveyed the land along Coomera River with 15,000 acres reserved for agricultural purposes. In 1865, William Alfred Binstead became the first white man to take up land in Upper Coomera area near a ford in the river that later formed part of a mail run. A ferry service was set up downstream which later became known as Coomera.

The sugar industry was soon established in the region with the Otmoor plantation of Arthur Ardagh producing the first refined sugar in 1870. South Sea Islander labour was utilised at Otmoor from its formation and by 1881 was the only type of labour used on the property.

The Upper Coomera Cemetery was first surveyed in 1871 and it opened in 1885, but it was not until 3 years later that someone was buried there.

By December 1888, an Anglican church had been built in Upper Coomera, but its opening was delayed until the return of Bishop William Webber from England to Queensland. The opening ceremony was conducted by the bishop on Sunday 31 March 1889 . The new Anglican Church of the Holy Road was opened on Saturday 18 December 1937 by Bishop William Wand.

The Upper Coomera Shire War Memorial is on the corner of Oxenford and Tamborine Road (27.90152°S 153.28828°E) and was unveiled on Saturday 18 May 1918 by Edward Macartney, Member of the Queensland Legislative Assembly. The memorial originally only honoured those from the district who fell in World War I; however, the names of those who perished during World War II were added later. The inscriptions on the memorial read:

"This memorial was erected by the residents, in honour of the brave lads of the Coomera district who fell in the Great War 1914–19. They gave their all. Let you who pass, saluting here their names, See that through you no slur, nor stain, nor shame Falls on the land for which they gave their lives – AUSTRALIA."

Coomera Upper Provisional School opened on 23 October 1876. On 15 July 1878 it became Coomera Upper State School. It closed in 1964.

Fern Hill State School opened in 1910 and closed on 24 March 1914.

The first bridge across the Coomera river was built in the 1930s.

Saint Stephen's College opened in 1996.

Coomera Anglican College was established on 27 January 1997 by the Anglican Diocese of Brisbane.

Upper Coomera State College opened on 1 January 2003.

Assisi Catholic College opened on 25 January 2005.

Coomera Springs State School opened in January 2008 on an 11-hectare (27-acre) site with approximately 90 students initially enrolled.

Highland Reserve State School was officially opened in January 2009 by Queensland Premier Anna Bligh. The school was originally proposed to be called Oxenford West State School.

== Demographics ==
In the 2016 census, Upper Coomera had a population of 25,276 people. Upper Coomera had one of the largest communities of both New Zealand Australians (894 people; 3.5%) and Māori Australians (1,549 people; 4.3%) of any suburb in Queensland.

In the 2021 census, Upper Coomera had a population of 27,180 people.

== Heritage listings ==
Upper Coomera has a number of heritage sites, including:

- Upper Coomera War Memorial, intersection of Tamborine-Oxenford Road and Charlies Crossing Road North

== Education ==
=== Primary-only schools ===
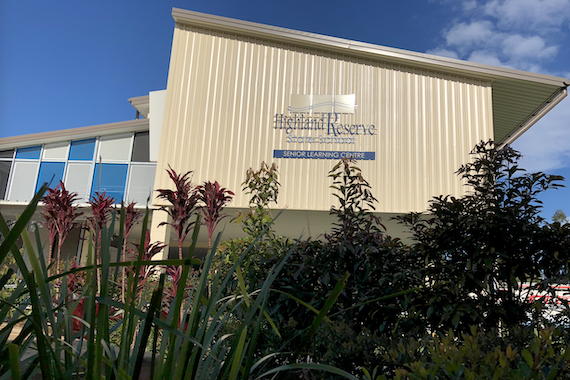
Highland Reserve State School, 2023

Coomera Springs State School is a government primary (Prep–6) school for boys and girls on Old Coach Road (27.8471°S 153.3005°E). In 2018, the school had an enrolment of 899 students with 60 teachers (56 full-time equivalent) and 29 non-teaching staff (22 full-time equivalent). It includes a special education program.

Highland Reserve State School is a government primary (Prep–6) school for boys and girls at 570 Reserve Road (27.8929°S 153.2829°E). In 2018, the school had an enrolment of 902 students with 62 teachers (58 full-time equivalent) and 45 non-teaching staff (25 full-time equivalent). It includes a special education program.

=== Primary and secondary schools ===
Upper Coomera State College is a government primary and secondary (Prep–12) school for boys and girls at 137 Reserve Road (27.8705°S 153.2961°E). In 2018, the school had an enrolment of 2,037 students with 180 teachers (169 full-time equivalent) and 96 non-teaching staff (69 full-time equivalent). It includes a special education program.

Assisi Catholic College is a Catholic primary and secondary (Prep–12) school for boys and girls at 173 Billinghurst Crescent (27.8583°S 153.3021°E). In 2018, the school had an enrolment of 1,398 students with 97 teachers (91 full-time equivalent) and 54 non-teaching staff (41 full-time equivalent).

Coomera Anglican College is a private primary and secondary (Prep–12) school for boys and girls at 8 Days Road (27.8584°S 153.3055°E). In 2017, the school had an enrolment of 1,407 students with 92 teachers (88 full-time equivalent) and 61 non-teaching staff (57 full-time equivalent). In 2018, the school had an enrolment of 1,414 students with 92 teachers (90 full-time equivalent) and 62 non-teaching staff (57 full-time equivalent). It has a 2,500-square-metre (27,000 sq ft) sports centre, which includes two full size netball courts as well as a full commercial gym operated by Coomera Focus on Fitness and available for use by the local community. The current principal is Mark D Sly.

Saint Stephen's College is a private primary and secondary (Prep–12) school for boys and girls at 31 Reserve Road (27.8700°S 153.3069°E). In 2017, the school had an enrolment of 1,294 students with 97 teachers (94 full-time equivalent) and 76 non-teaching staff (65 full-time equivalent). In 2018, the school had an enrolment of 1,265 students with 98 teachers (93 full-time equivalent) and 79 non-teaching staff (65 full-time equivalent).

== Community ==
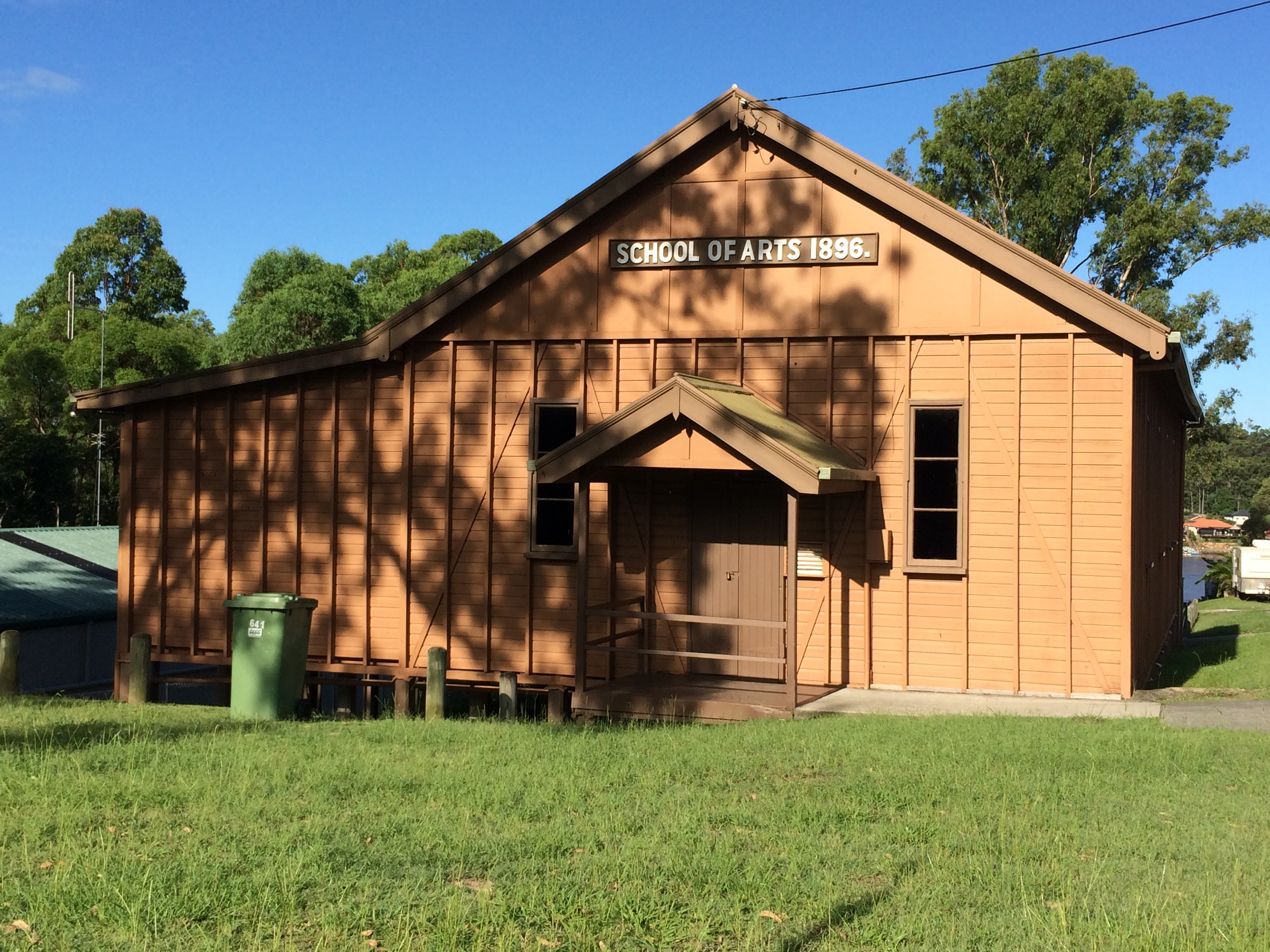
Upper Coomera School of Arts, 2015

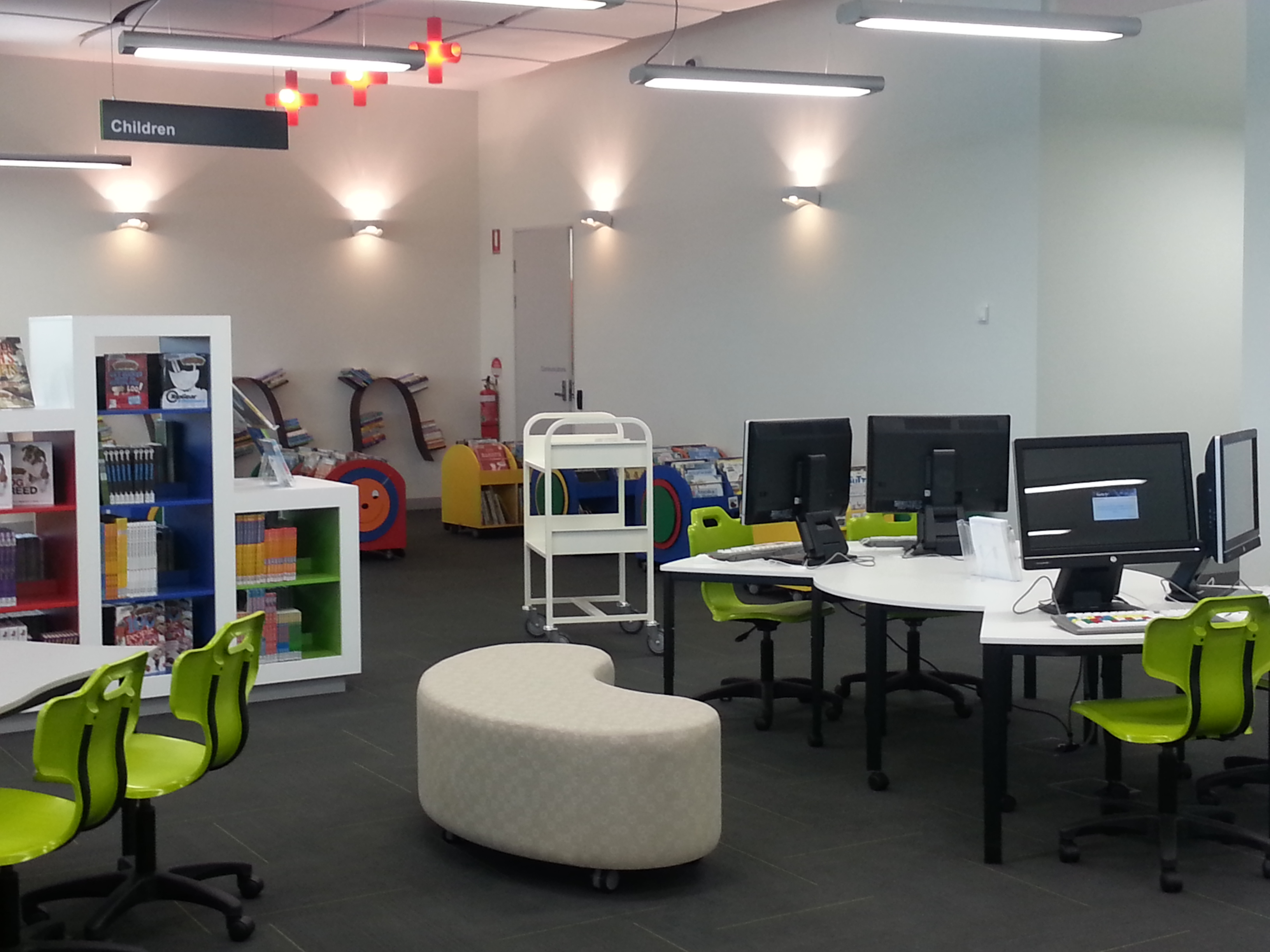
Upper Coomera Library

The Upper Coomera Community Centre is located on Reserve Road and contains the office of Councillor Donna Gates, Customer Service Office, Aquatic Centre, and Upper Coomera Branch Library. The community centre opened on 14 June 2013. The Upper Coomera Branch Library opened in April 2013 and is the newest branch of the Gold Coast libraries.

The Upper Coomera School of Arts was established in 1896. It is used for public meetings and other community purposes.

== Retail ==
Upper Coomera has several shopping venues, the main ones being Coomera City Centre, Coomera Grand Shopping Centre and The Hub at the junction of Days Road and Old Coach Road.

Nearby major shopping centres include Westfield Coomera, Westfield Helensvale, Robina Town Centre, Pacific Fair, Harbour Town Shopping Centre and Australia Fair. Westfield Coomera in the neighbouring suburb of Coomera is a new addition to the local area.

== Public transport ==
Upper Coomera is well serviced by a variety of bus routes operated by Kinetic Gold Coast. There is also a train station on Foxwell Road in the neighbouring suburb of Coomera.

== See also ==
- List of tramways in Queensland
