= Trinity Lutheran College (Queensland) =

Location
- Ashmore, Gold Coast, Queensland; Australia; 27°59′02″S 153°22′19″E

Information
- School type: Private and independent Co-educational
- Motto: No other Foundation... Jesus Christ!
- Religious affiliation: Christian
- Established: 1981
- Headmaster: Miss Laura Robbins
- Enrolment: ~1200
- Colours: Green, white and black
- Affiliation: Associated Private Schools
- Website: tlc.qld.edu.au

Trinity Lutheran College is an independent, Christian co-educational, preparatory, early learning, junior, middle and senior years' college in Ashmore, Gold Coast, Australia.

== History ==
In January 1981, Trinity Lutheran Primary School was opened by Eddie and Lila MacKenzie, Ben Stephan, and Jack and Irene Strohmeyer. The school began with 75 students, with the first classes in the Trinity Lutheran Church Hall, Southport.

In 1987, Trinity Lutheran College for Years 8 to 12 was opened on the Ashmore Road campus in 1987.

In 2002, the two schools amalgamated to form Trinity Lutheran College providing schooling from Prep to Year 12.

In 2013, the Early Learning Centre was established on the Junior Years campus on Cotlew Street.

== School structure ==
=== Campuses ===
The Trinity Lutheran College is one college, comprising three schools across two campuses. The Early Learning and Junior Year's campus is located around the corner from the main Ashmore Road Trinity Campus. The Junior Year campus runs from Preparatory class to Year 5. The Middle and Senior Year campus caters for students in Years 6 to 12.

=== Facilities and grounds ===
Major facilities include a 700-seat Chapel/auditorium, a 150-seat Cultural Precinct, a Multi-purpose Hall and Sports Centre, a 25 metre swimming pool, Cricket Nets and a Design Technology and Trade Training Centre.

== School events ==
=== Arts ===
A whole school musical production is held biennially, previous productions include; Grease, Elements (a self-comprised production), We Will Rock You and The Wizard Of Oz. A Twilight concert is held every term which contains students taking part in Private Tuition. A Battle of the Bands competition between the three competing houses is also held each year in February.

Trinity's productions were on a 4-year rotation of Musical Production, International Tour, Major Production (Large-scale play), and National Tour. However, this has recently been changed to a 2-year rotation of Musical Production and Local Competition/Element specific showcase. There is also an annual Christmas service.

The current head of arts is Mrs Cherie Smith.

=== Outdoor education ===
Students participate in sports such as swimming, triathlon, water polo, cross country, and athletics carnivals. Annual camps, such as Musical Camp and Band Camp, are offered to most grades.

=== Public events ===
The annual College Fete is held on the first Saturday of August.

== Pathways ==
=== OP ===
Trinity offers the OP tertiary entrance rank system. This pathway returns an OP out of 1–25 based on grades in Year 12 and a QCS Test.

=== Vocational education ===
Vocational Education – certificate courses, school based traineeships and apprenticeships.

=== International Baccalaureate ===
Trinity is one of a few International Baccalaureate IB World Schools on the Gold Coast. The Junior Years' campus (Prep to Year 5) program uses the International Baccalaureate Primary Years Program.

== Notable alumni ==
- Tim Behrendorff - Basketball Player for the Cairns Taipans
- Ambrosia Malone - Australian Field Hockey Player
- Maggie Naouri – Actress
- Samantha Strauss - Screenwriter, Creator of Dance Academy
- Kelsey Wakefield – Olympic Athlete, Australian Women's Water Polo Team
