= Kelsey Wakefield =

Australian water polo player

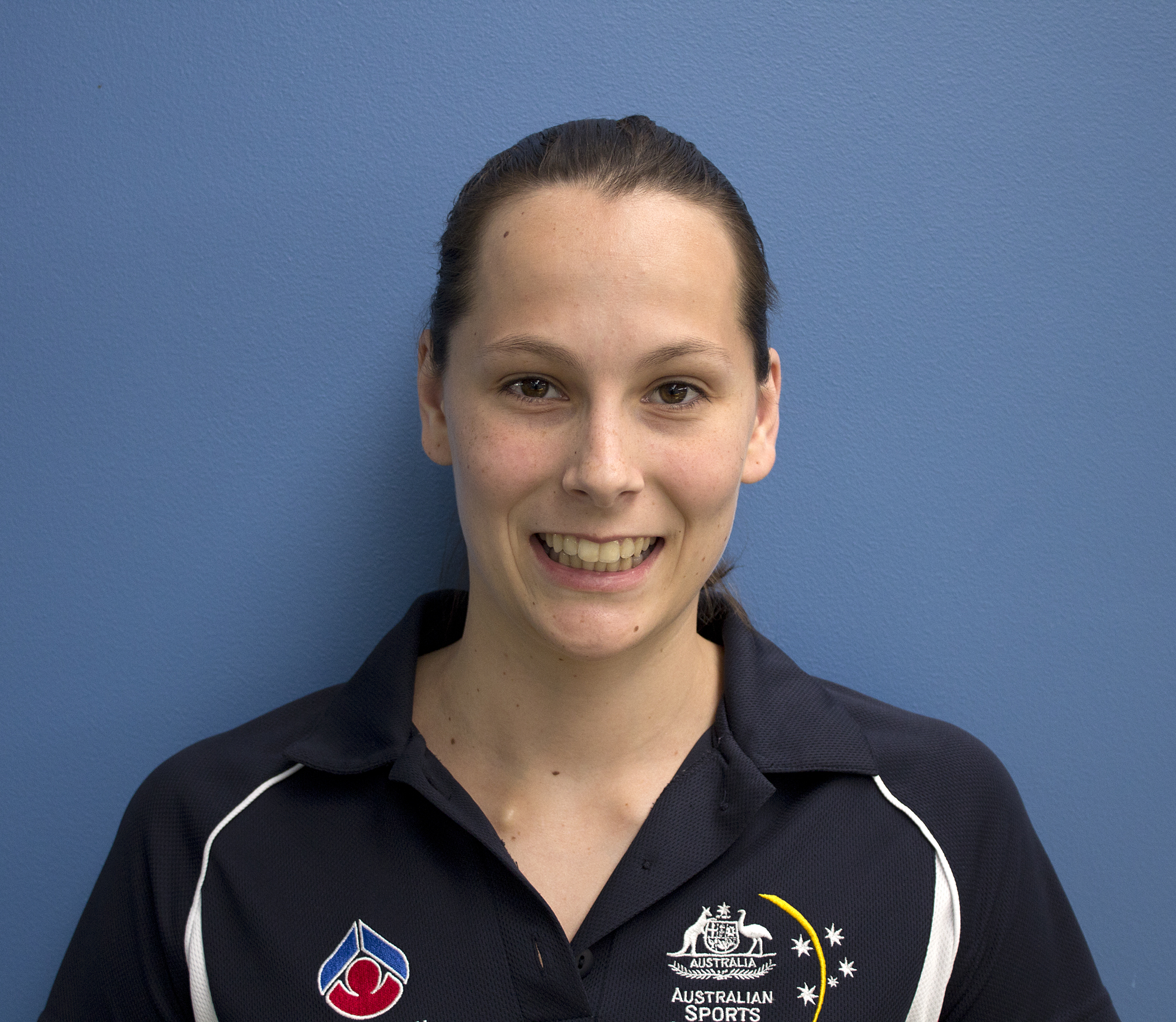

Personal information
- Nationality: Australian
- Born: 1 June 1991 (age 35) Gold Coast, Queensland
- Height: 178 cm (5 ft 10 in)
- Weight: 64 kg (141 lb)

Sport
- Sport: Water polo
- Club: Brisbane Barracudas
Medal record
World Championships
Silver medal – second place	2013 Barcelona	Team competition
FINA World League
Silver medal – second place	2010 Finals	Team competition
Canada Cup
Gold medal – first place	2011 Canada Cup	Team competition
FINA Junior World Championships
Bronze medal – third place	2011 Junior Worlds	Team competition

Kelsey Wakefield (born 1 June 1991) is an Australian water polo player. Wakefield has been a member of the Australia women's national water polo team at the junior starting in 2006 and senior level starting in 2009. She earned a silver medal at the 2010 FINA World League, a gold medal at the 2011 Canada Cup and a bronze medal at the 2011 FINA Junior World Championships. Wakefield won a championship as a member of the 2011 Brisbane Barracudas squad in the National Water Polo League. As part of the Aussie Stingers, Wakefield represented Australia at the 2016 Summer Olympics.

== Personal life ==
Wakefield was born on 1 June 1991 in Gold Coast, Queensland. She is 178 cm (5 ft 10 in) tall and weighs 64 kilograms (141 lb). She has a wingspan of 183 cm (6 ft 0 in), and is left-handed.

While she was growing up, Wakefield's house had a backyard pool, where she used to train with her sister, Brittany. As a five-year-old, she watched the Olympics on television and dreamed of competing at the Games.

Wakefield attended Trinity Lutheran College, and was a straight-A student. Beyond water polo, while in school, she also competed in the high jump. In 2006, after winning the Queensland state championships, and setting a Queensland age group record and personal best of 166 cm (5 ft 5 in), she competed in the U16 national athletics competition. In 2007, she finished fourth in her age group in high jump at the national championships. In 2008, she competed at the Queensland U20 state athletics championships in the event, finishing second with a 165 cm (5 ft 5 in). She eventually chose water polo over the high jump because she preferred to play a team sport. Her departure from the sport was also a result of conflicting training times between it and water polo.

Wakefield has a Bachelor of Biomedical Schiene from Griffith University on the Gold Coast. She took a semester off from school in order to concentrate full-time on playing water polo with the hope of making the Olympics. One of the reasons she is pursuing a career in medicine is because her father is a doctor. She is thinking of specialising in pediatrics or anesthetics.

== Water polo ==
Wakefield is a member of the Australia women's national water polo team. She is a goalkeeper. She wears several different numbers including 1, 13 and 18. She took up the sport when she was twelve years old at school. In 2006, at the Australian Country Championships, she competed for the Queensland open women's team. In 2007, she competed at the U16 Australian Water Polo Championships and was named the goalkeeper of the tournament. She competed at the 2009 Australian National U20 Water Polo Championships for Queensland, where her team finished second to New South Wales. She competed at the Australian National U20 competition in 2011, where her team took home gold. She trains at the Queensland Academy of Sport, and during the regular season, she may drive as many as 1,000 kilometres (620 mi) a week driving between home, university, the Queensland Academy of Sport, to training facilities and competition pools. The City South News in Brisbane describes her as an "Australian water polo prodigy". Between appearances on the junior national team and the senior national team, she has already played more than 50 games for Australia. She currently holds a water polo scholarship at the Australian Institute of Sport.

=== Club water polo ===
Wakefield plays club water polo for the Brisbane Barracudas who compete in the National Water Polo League. She was with the team in 2008. She was a member of the team in 2011 when they won the league championship for the third year in a row. She was in goal for the championship match with the score 4–4 at the end of regular time, 1–1 at the end of over time and finally going to a shootout. Wakefield was named to the league's 2011 All Star team.

=== Juniors ===
Wakefield represented Australia in 2006 at the U16 national team that competed at the New Zealand hosted Pan Pacific Championships. In 2007, she was a member of the U16 national team. In 2008, she was a member of the U16 and U17 national teams, and the first ranked goal keeper on the U16 squad. She was a member of the Australian side that finished third at the 2011 FINA Junior World Championships. She was the captain of the Australian side. The team finished third after losing to eventual gold medalist, Spain, during the semifinals.

=== Seniors ===
Wakefield made her first appearance for the senior side at the 2009 Canada Cup. She was a member of the 2010 team that finished second at the FINA World League Super Finals held in La Jolla, California. She competed at the 2010 Canada Cup. In a preliminary round match against Canada that Australia won 11–5, she made 10 saves in goal. Her team played Italy in the semi-finals of the 2010 Cup. She represented Australia at the 2011 Canada Cup, and participated in the gold medal final match against China that Australia won. She was named the Goalkeeper of the Tournament. She competed in a warm up match for the 2011 FINA Water Polo World League against Italy in Ostia, Italy in July that Australia won 12–11.

In October 2011, as a representative of the senior squad, she attended a training camp at the Australian Institute of Sport. The camp had four goal Australian goalkeepers at it, of which only two would be named to the squad to compete at the Olympics. She competed in the Pan Pacific Championships in January 2012 for the Australian Stingers. She was part of the Stingers squad that competed in a five-game test against Great Britain at the AIS in late February 2012. She did not compete in the first match. She competed in the remaining four matches in the series.

== Recognition ==
In 2008, Wakefield was nominated for Gold Coast Sportsperson of the Year. In 2010, she was nominated for the Queensland Junior Sportswoman of the Year.

== See also ==
- Australia women's Olympic water polo team records and statistics
- List of women's Olympic water polo tournament goalkeepers
- List of World Aquatics Championships medalists in water polo
