= Coomera Anglican College =

Location
- 10 Days Road, Upper Coomera, Queensland; Australia; 27°51′28″S 153°18′20″E

Information
- Type: Independent co-education early learning, primary and secondary day school
- Motto: Empowering Change – Where Anything is Possible
- Religious affiliation: Anglican Diocese of Brisbane
- Denomination: Anglican
- Established: 1997; 29 years ago
- Founder: The Hon Ivan Gibbs, Mr Rod Lane, Mr Ian Smith, Mr Richard Morris, Foundation principle Dr Mark Sly
- Status: Open
- Principal: Mr Patrick Innes-Hill
- Teaching staff: 106 (2026)
- Employees: 109
- Enrolment: 1,595 (2026)
- Average class size: 30
- Campus type: Suburban
- Houses: Gibbs; Smith; Morris; Lane;Sly; Legat
- Slogan: Empowering Change – Where Anything is Possible
- Mascot: CACaburra
- Nickname: CAC
- Tuition: $15000 p/A
- Affiliation: Associated Private Schools

Coomera Anglican College is an independent Anglican co-educational early learning, primary and secondary school located in Upper Coomera, Queensland, Australia.

Founded in 1997 and operated by the Anglican Diocese of Brisbane, the college caters for students from early learning, Prep to Year 12.

== House system ==
Coomera Anglican College has four houses:

- Gibbs
- Smith
- Morris
- Lane
- Sly
- Legat

All members of the same family are placed in the same house. Each house is named after a person who had a part in the foundation of the school.

== School culture ==
In 2011, a student-created film titled "Beware of Peter Goodman" emerged as a cultural touchstone within the Anglican school, lampooning senior secondary teachers and their unique enforcement of the school uniform policy. This satirical portrayal quickly became a recurring tradition among graduating classes, with each subsequent year producing their own adaptations and interpretations of the original theme. Despite occasional controversy, the film's enduring popularity has contributed to ongoing conversations about school culture and the evolving dynamics between students and faculty over the years.

== Notable alumni ==
- Kimberly Birrell, tennis player.
- Emerson Jones, tennis player.
- Hayden Jones, tennis player
- Taylor Smith, Australian rules footballer who began her career with the Gold Coast Suns. Following the 2020 AFLW season, Smith moved to the Brisbane Lions, where she became a premiership player in the 2021 AFLW grand final winning team.
- Jade Wall, softball player who represented Australia at the 2020 Tokyo Olympics, hitting Australia's first home run for the 2021 Games against Mexico in the Opening Rounds.

== See also ==
- List of schools in Queensland
- List of Anglican schools in Australia
