= Upper Coomera State College =

Coordinates: 27°52′14″S 153°17′53″E

- Gold Coast, Queensland; Australia

Information
- Type: Public state school
- Motto: Learning Pathways to the Future
- Established: 2003
- Executive principal: Noel Rawlins
- Enrolment: 1,834 (2023)
- Campus: Upper Coomera
- Colours: Teal, purple and gold
- Website: uppercoomerasc.eq.edu.au

Upper Coomera State College (UCSC) is a public, co-educational school located in the suburb of Coomera in Queensland, Australia. It is administered by the Department of Education, and as of 2023, has an enrolment of 1,834 students and a teaching staff of 150. The school enrols students from Prep to Year 12, in 3 sub-schools: Chisholm Junior School, Jakaara Middle School and Fensham Senior School.

== History ==
The school was established on 1 January 2003.

During 2011, it was said that racial bullying at the school was 'out of hand,' with 5-6 lockdowns occurring within the past 3 years due to the problem. However, the regional director for the Department of Education at the time, Glen Hoppner, stated that the school did not have race-related problems.

In 2013, the school took part in an Australian-wide initiative called 'Day for Daniel' by dressing in red to honour the memory of Daniel Morcombe; a ‘Walk for Daniel’ also occurred.

The school was sent into lockdown after threats via social media were made toward the school in 2018, supposedly by a Year 7 and a Year 9 student; however, it was revealed later that it was not a student, but a 36-year-old woman, who was charged for the incident.

== Extra-curricular ==
The school offers the following Extra-curricular programs:

- Creative Arts Academy,
- STEM Academy,
- Sports Academy,
- The 'Future Stars' program.
