= Saint Stephen's College =

- Coomera, Gold Coast, Queensland; Australia

Information
- Former name: St. Stephen's College
- Funding type: Independent and Government
- Denomination: Christian
- Patron saint: Saint Stephen
- Established: 18th September, 1995
- Status: Open
- Sister school: Hanazono High School, Kyoto, Japan
- School board: Laurie Vogler (Board Member, Risk & Compliance Chair, Governance & Recruitment Committee); Ken Petty (Board Chair & Ex-officio of all sub committees); Glenn Finger (Board Member, Risk & Compliance Committee, Governance & Recruitment Committee); Rachel Campbell (Board Member, Finance Committee & Risk & Compliance Committee); Peter Hollett (Board Member, Finance Chair, Risk & Compliance Committee, Building & Education Committee, Governance & Recruitment Committee); Rebecca Lennon (Board Member, Building & Education Chair); Karen St Geroge (Board Member, Building & Education Committee and Governance & Recruitment Chair)
- Headmaster: Brian Rowe (1996–2003); Jamie Dorrington (2003–2019); Kim Cohen (2020–2023); Janelle Anderson (2023); Michael Kleidon (2024–Present)
- Houses: Bell, Greasley, Haley, Hughes
- Affiliation: Associated Private Schools
- Website: www.saintstephenscollege.net.au

Saint Stephen's College (SSC) is an independent, non-denominational Christian, co-educational, P-12 school, located in the Gold Coast suburb of Coomera, in Queensland, Australia. It is administered by Independent Schools Queensland, with an enrolment of 1,291 students and a teaching staff of 99, as of 2023. The school serves students from Prep to Year 12.

== History ==
The school was established 1 January 1996, initially struggling "with money woes and accusations of financial mismanagement."

In 2018, seven students were taken to hospital after a drug overdose; they were all expelled after the last student was released from hospital. Another two students suffered an overdose and subsequently taken to hospital the following year in 2019.

In 2020, a Year 7 student impaled himself on a javelin.

In 2021, the school celebrated its 25th Anniversary. This celebration was noted as "a very essential milestone" by then principal Kim Cohen.

== Notable alumni ==
- Scott McLaughlin, a New Zealand racing car driver.
- Monika Wejnert, a former professional tennis player.
