= A.B. Paterson College =

Private school on the Gold Coast, Queensland, Australia

Location
- 10 A B Paterson Drive; Arundel, Gold Coast, 4214; Australia; 27°55′39″S 153°21′33″E

Information
- Motto: Excellence, Care, Commitment
- Founded: January 1, 1991; 35 years ago
- Principal: Robert Nicholls (1989–1994); Dawn Lang (1994–2011); Brian Grimes (2012–2020); Joanne Sheehy (2020–present)
- Staff: 198
- Teaching staff: 119
- Enrollment: 1,607 (2023)
- Colors: Green and Gold
- Slogan: Developing young men and women of character – leaders now and for the future.
- Affiliation: Associated Private Schools
- Alumni name: Old Collegians
- Namesake: Banjo Paterson
- Website: www.abpat.qld.edu.au

A.B. Paterson College is a private, non-denominational, co-educational K–12 school located in the City of Gold Coast suburb of Arundel, Queensland, Australia. It is administered by Independent Schools Queensland, with an enrollment of 1,607 students and a teaching staff of 119, as of 2023. It is a member of the Gold Coast's Associated Private Schools sporting association.

== History ==
A.B. Paterson College started as an idea "over a shared meal with four close friends" in 1989. Construction and land clearing efforts began in 1990 within the local Arundel community, and some initial and temporary classrooms were constructed. The school was scheduled to open in January 1991, with an initial enrollment on opening day of 262 students between Prep and Year 9—growing to 305 by the end of the year. By 1994, the enrollment reached 670. Throughout the late 90s, more permanent structures were built for different uses (science labs, a childcare centre, more high school classrooms). In 2006, the Dawn Lang Performing Arts Centre was constructed on campus, named after sitting principal Dawn Lang. In 2008, the Mathematics Learning & Research Centre was opened, which featured mathematics classrooms and a home economics classroom. In 2010, A.B. Paterson completed the construction of the Dunlop Multi-Purpose Centre complex, containing physical education classrooms, indoor sports courts, and a gym. In 2012, the school introduced a program to provide every student between Years 4–12 with a personal laptop. In June 2019, the Winton Centre (named after the town in central Queensland) was opened. The Winton Centre is 4,500 m^{2} in size and cost A$12.5 million (2019) (equivalent to A$13.82 million or US$10.03 million in 2022).

Since 1994, A.B. Paterson College has run a school camp for Year 6 students to the town of Winton, Queensland. After purchasing a parcel of land in 2021, construction of the Barty's Place accommodation facility was completed, and an opening ceremony was held on 16 July 2023.

In April 2024 the NFL announced the planned opening of an NFL Academy in Australia for September 2024. Additionally, a public dedicated on-campus "elite high-performance NFL Academy facility" was announced to be completed in 2026. When established, it would be the second facility of its kind. The first recruitment process occurred on 29 June 2024 at the College. The goal of its establishment is to expand the overall interest of the sport worldwide, so that the NFL can reach its revenue goal of $25 billion by 2027. The facility will also be available for community use.

=== Media Attention ===
In 2017, A.B. Paterson College was brought under news media scrutiny after an incident at a spelling bee where a student who spelt the word "absence" correctly was marked as having it spelt incorrectly, with their point instead given to another student who had spelt the word incorrectly. The incident resulted in the mother of the student pulling him out of the school.

On Tuesday, 29 May 2018, the school was sent into lockdown after the school received an anonymous threat via email at about 8 am, a day after the publishing of an online post about shooting threats targeted towards Queensland schools. The lockdown was lifted almost immediately after police arrived and identified that the threat was not credible.

In October 2021, A.B. Paterson College revealed the Captain and Vice-Captaincy roles for 2022 as both being held by males. In the preceding years, there had been a general precedent of both male and female representation in the captaincy. The reaction from the parent base of the school was divided, with some saying that "if they picked two females the silence would be deafening"—in response the media's presentation of the issue. The school responded by saying that the selection process was "based on merit alone" and that there was no sexism involved in the process. The chosen captains for 2022 were not changed.

That same month, an incident occurred between mathematics teacher Travis Ronald Templar and a 12-year-old student where Templar reportedly kicked the student in the back, causing her to fall. When the incident was reported, Templar's employment was immediately ceased at the school.

On 17 March 2023, the school purchased a nearby house adjacent to the school's land. The principal, Joanne Sheehy, cited that the sale of the house presented a "strategic opportunity," and that the purpose of the purchase was to earmark it for potential future use as teacher accommodation. A.B. Paterson College also attracted media attention after becoming involved in a land gift from property developers who were planning to develop a 67 ha area of green space near the school that used to belong to a recently bankrupt golf course. It was said that the 7 ha of land gifted to the school would be for the construction of sporting facilities. Sheehy stated that the proposal was entirely petitioned by the development company to the government and local residents, and that the school had no involvement other than their support of the concept.

=== Teaching Methods ===
A.B. Paterson College bases its pedagogy on the Harvard Graduate School of Education's Teaching for Understanding (TfU) model. The TfU model as implemented by the school intends to base the internal curriculum around lessons aimed at forming a complete understanding of a topic within a student's mind, as opposed to more conventional knowledge-retention-based methods which focus on the singular metric of improving standardised testing scores.

The school's move towards the TfU model took place during the 2000s, as a part of a larger worldwide Harvard study on the effectiveness of such a model's implementation in hundreds of schools. The study cites improved teacher-student relationships and better classroom learning effectiveness as a result of a teaching style based around understanding over memorisation.

== A.B. Paterson College Foundation ==
A B Paterson College Limited
- Trade name: A.B. Paterson College
- Type: Company limited by guarantee
- Subsidiaries: A B Paterson College Foundation Ltd

A B Paterson College Foundation Ltd (trading as the A.B. Paterson College Foundation) is a registered charity founded in 2018 for the purpose of philanthropy through granting student scholarships and the "generation of the financial resources to enable the realisation of the College’s Masterplan [sic]."

== Notable alumni ==
- Helena Merten, Australian high diver and acrobatic performer.
- Sophie Monk, Australian singer, actress, television personality, and model.
- Leiston Pickett, Australian Commonwealth Games gold medalist swimmer.

== See also ==
- List of schools in Gold Coast, Queensland
