= Mermaid Beach, Queensland =

Mermaid Beach
- Suburb
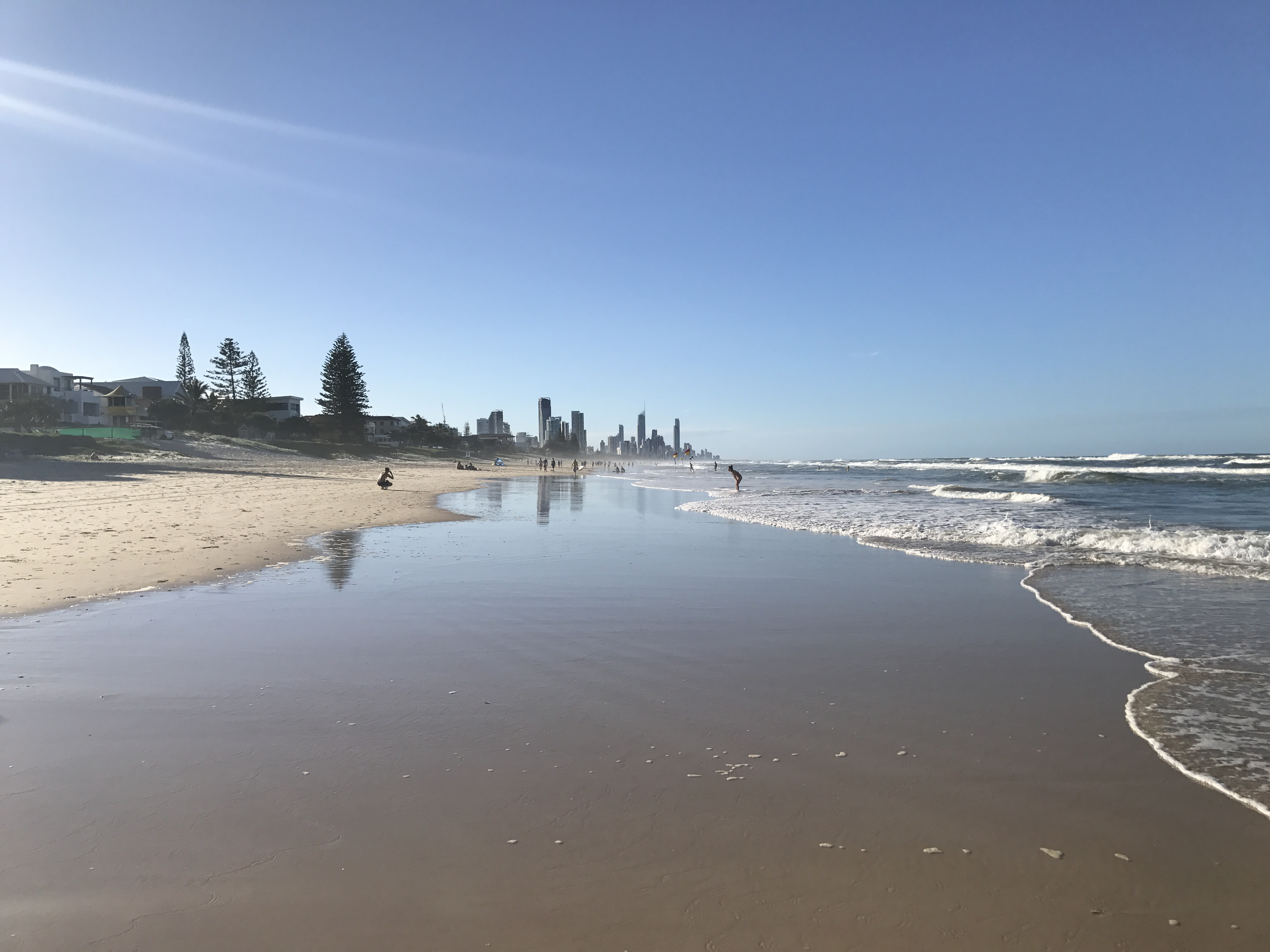
- Mermaid Beach, looking North

- Interactive map of Mermaid Beach
- Coordinates: 28.0483°S 153.4369°E
- Country: Australia
- State: Queensland
- City: Gold Coast
- LGA: City of Gold Coast
- Location: 6.0 km (3.7 mi) SSE of Surfers Paradise; 11.8 km (7.3 mi) S of Southport; 26.6 km (16.5 mi) NNW of Tweed Heads; 84.7 km (52.6 mi) SSE of Brisbane

Government
  - State electorate: Mermaid Beach
  - Federal division: Moncrieff

Area
  - Total: 1.5 km^{2} (0.58 sq mi)
- Elevation: 7 m (23 ft)

Population
  - Total: 7,329 (2021 census)
  - Density: 4,890/km^{2} (12,700/sq mi)
- Time zone: UTC+10:00 (AEST)
- Postcode: 4218
Suburbs around Mermaid Beach
Broadbeach Waters	Broadbeach	Coral Sea
Mermaid Waters	Mermaid Beach	Coral Sea
Mermaid Waters	Miami	Coral Sea

Mermaid Beach is a coastal suburb of the City of Gold Coast in Queensland, Australia. In the 2021 census, Mermaid Beach had a population of 7,329 people.

Nobby Beach is a neighbourhood in the south of the suburb (28.0589°S 153.4414°E).

== Geography ==
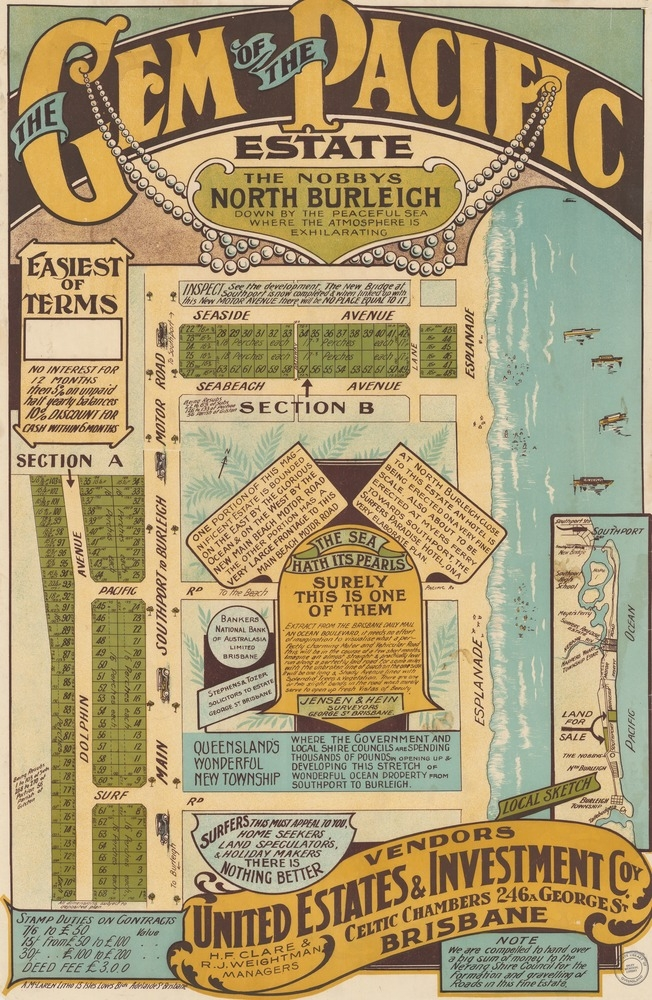
Real estate map of Gem of the Pacific Estate, circa 1920

The suburb is bounded to the west by the artificial canals of adjacent Mermaid Waters and to the east by the Pacific Ocean. To the north is the suburb of Broadbeach, to the south Miami. The Gold Coast Highway passes through Mermaid Beach.

The Gold Coast Oceanway (a pedestrian path) travels along Hedges Avenue.

== History ==
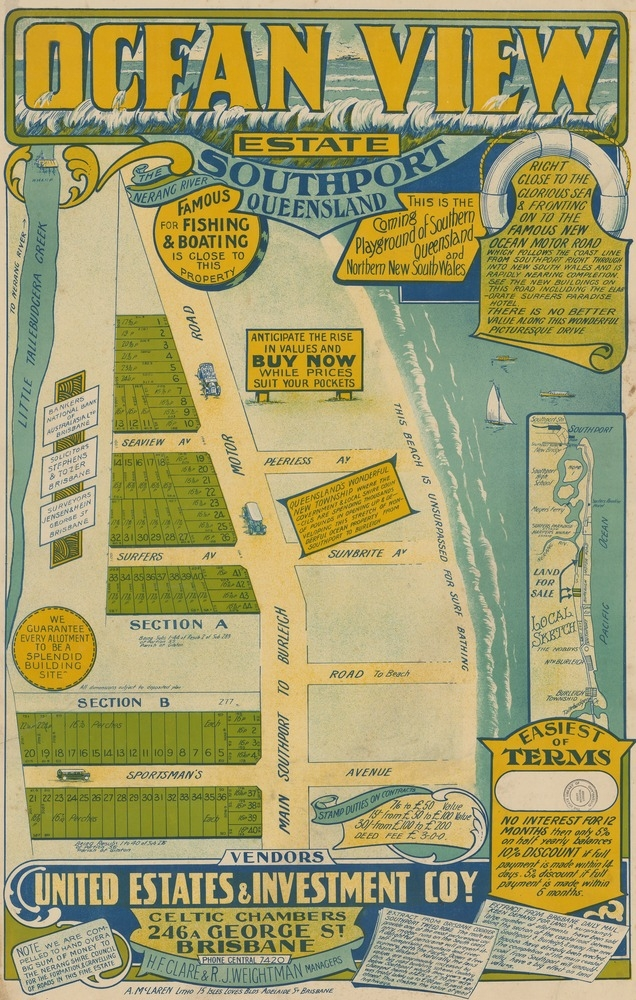
Real estate map of Ocean View Estate (now Mermaid Beach), circa 1920

Mermaid Beach receives its name from the cutter HMS Mermaid. Explorer John Oxley sailed aboard the Mermaid in 1823 when he discovered the nearby Tweed and Brisbane rivers.

Mermaid Beach was used during World War II by US servicemen R.C. Oates named the Los Angelos Esplanade (now Hedges Avenue) as part of a land development on the Gold Coast. The name subsequently transferred from the esplanade to the adjoining beach. A period advertising brochure survives showing this name. This establishes that “Los Angeles Beach” was already on the map two decades before WWII. The later, widely repeated claim that US servicemen coined the name during the war is an urban myth: writers who encountered “Los Angeles Beach” in wartime anecdotes assumed it was a wartime American nickname, when the name pre-dated the war's arrival on the Gold Coast by roughly twenty years. url=https://collections.slq.qld.gov.au/viewer/IE427830 Circa 1924, 70 allotments were advertised as "Mermaid Beach Estate" located at Mermaid Beach and Broadbeach to be auctioned by R. G. Oates Estates. The estate map has 3 estates for sale at Mermaid Beach and Broadbeach. The estates were divided in two by the "New Coastal Road" running through the Gold Coast.

Magic Mountain, Nobby Beach opened up in 1962

On 24 August 1975, the first McDonald's restaurant in Queensland opened in Mermaid Beach.

St James' Anglican Church was dedicated on 11 November 1977 by Assistant Bishop Ralph Wicks. Its closure on 15 August 1993 was approved by Assistant Bishop Ron Williams.

== Demographics ==
In the 2011 census, Mermaid Beach had a population of 5,722 people.

In the 2016 census, Mermaid Beach had a population of 6,533 people.

In the 2021 census, Mermaid Beach had a population of 7,329 people.

== Education ==
There are no schools in Mermaid Beach. The nearest government primary schools are Broadbeach State School in neighbouring Broadbeach to the north and Miami State School in neighbouring Mermaid Waters to the south-west. The nearest government secondary schools are Merrimac State High School in Mermaid Waters to the west and Miami State High School in neighbouring Miami to the south.

== Amenities ==
The Mermaid Beach branch of the Queensland Country Women's Association meets at QCWA Hall at 43 Ventura Road (28.0407°S 153.4346°E).

Other community groups include:

- Mermaid Beach Surf Life Saving Club
- Nobby Beach Surf Life Saving Club
