= Clear Island Waters, Queensland =

Clear Island Waters
- Suburb
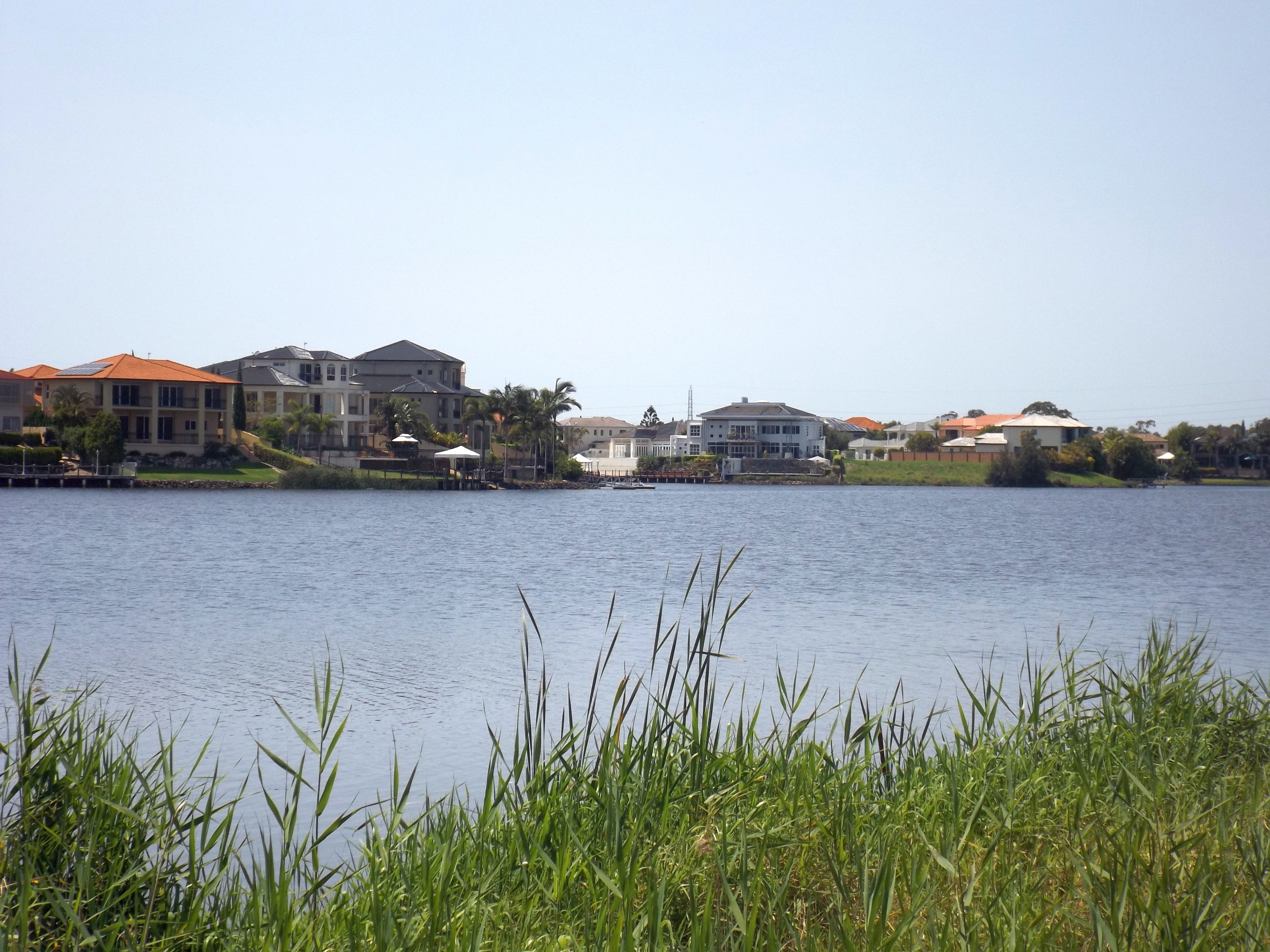
- Canal homes, 2015

- Interactive map of Clear Island Waters
- Coordinates: 28.0419°S 153.3983°E
- Country: Australia
- State: Queensland
- City: Gold Coast
- LGA: City of Gold Coast
- Location: 6.6 km (4.1 mi) SSW of Surfers Paradise; 10.6 km (6.6 mi) S of Southport; 79.9 km (49.6 mi) SSE of Brisbane CBD
- Established: 1989

Government
  - State electorate: Surfers Paradise
  - Federal division: McPherson

Area
  - Total: 4.3 km^{2} (1.7 sq mi)
- Elevation: 3 m (9.8 ft)

Population
  - Total: 4,395 (2021 census)
  - Density: 1,022/km^{2} (2,647/sq mi)
- Time zone: UTC+10:00 (AEST)
- Postcode: 4226
Suburbs around Clear Island Waters
Carrara	Broadbeach Waters	Broadbeach Waters
Merrimac	Clear Island Waters	Mermaid Waters
Robina	Robina	Mermaid Waters

Clear Island Waters is a suburb of the City of Gold Coast in Queensland, Australia. In the 2021 census, Clear Island Waters had a population of 4,395 people.

== Geography ==
The suburb is a residential area surrounding the artificial canals of Clear Island Lake and Boobegan Creek.

== History ==
The area that is now Clear Island Waters was a dairy community in the south and rural wetlands in the north in the early stages of the 20th century.

In 1967, when property developer Bruce Small, who became Gold Coast Mayor later that year, convinced a group of golfers to purchase his 92-acre landholding at Cypress Gardens for $43,240 to build the Surfers Paradise Golf Club.

In 1976, a group of Gold Coast-based Italian families established the Italo-Australian Club on a block of land adjacent to the Surfers Paradise Golf Club and the venture led to an influx of Italian families moving to the suburb. In 1986, St Vincent's Primary School relocated from Surfers Paradise to Clear Island Waters and the Sacred Heart Parish Church was opened next to the primary school after the parish priest Dr Owen Oxenham initiated the move.

The suburb was officially named and bounded on 25 February 1989.

In the early 1990s when approval was gained to build multiple canal estates known as Island Quay, Rhode Island and Santa Cruz.

== Demographics ==
In the 2011 census, Clear Island Waters had a population of 3,986 people, 52.6% female and 47.4% male. The median age of the Clear Island Waters population was 49 years, 12 years above the national median of 37. 56.7% of people living in Clear Island Waters were born in Australia. The other top responses for country of birth were England 6.9%, New Zealand 6.8%, South Africa 2.6%, China 2.3%, Taiwan 1.6%. 75.7% of people spoke only English at home; the next most common languages were 4.3% Mandarin, 2.2% Cantonese, 1.6% Japanese, 1.2% Italian, 1% French.

In the 2016 census, Clear Island Waters had a population of 4,120 people.

In the 2021 census, Clear Island Waters had a population of 4,395 people.

== Education ==
St Vincent's Primary School is a Catholic primary (Prep-6) school for boys and girls at Fairway Drive (28.0354°S 153.4025°E) at the north-eastern end of the suburb. In 2017, the school had an enrolment of 764 students with 45 teachers (40 full-time equivalent) and 21 non-teaching staff (16 full-time equivalent).

There are no government schools in Clear Island Waters. The nearest government primary schools are Broadbeach State School in Broadbeach to the north-east, Robina State School in neighbouring Robina to the south, and Merrimac State School in neighbouring Merrimac to the west.The nearest government secondary school is Merrimac State High School in neighbouring Mermaid Waters to the east.

== Sport ==
The Surfers Paradise Golf Club and Surfers Paradise Tennis Club are both located on Fairway Drive. Association football club Merrimac F.C. is located in the north-eastern corner of the suburb and is run by the adjacent Italo-Australian club.
