= Homebodii =

Australian fashion label

Homebodii is an Australian fashion label based in Arundel, Queensland.

== History ==
Homebodii was founded in 2012 by Ingrid Bonnor, a former model, after noticing a lack of options for pre-wedding sleepwear and robes while preparing for her own wedding. Drawing from her experience at her mother's ballet studio, Bonnor incorporated creativity and femininity into her designs. She worked with local dressmakers to create her initial commercial collection of bridal robes and sleepwear. Later, these collections were stocked by major American retailers, including Urban Outfitters, Nordstrom, Anthropologie, and were later featured by David Jones in Australia.

In September 2016, Homebodii made its debut runway show at New York Fashion Week.

In 2017, Sophie Monk was featured as the face of a Homebodii Feel Beautiful campaign, which was well received by the public and particularly popular among brides.

In December 2018, Homebodii launched its Curve range featuring Australian plus-size model Margaret McPherson.

In December 2022, Homebodii and Halston collaborated on a 12-piece sleepwear capsule collection that combined the aesthetics of Queensland's Gold Coast with Halston's glamorous style.

In 2023, Homebodii received the Premier of Queensland's Export Awards in the e-Commerce Category.

== Operations ==
Most of Homebodii's operations are online, but its also operates a boutique at the Pacific Fair shopping centre on the Gold Coast.

== Designs ==
Homebodii's designs often draw inspiration from the natural beauty of Australia's Gold Coast, including its beaches, flora, fauna, mountains, and rainforests. It is known for its use of unique prints and materials such as lace, satin, and soft knits, while avoiding mainstream fashion trends. Its clothes have been used by Taylor Swift.

Homebodii's Farrah robe is the most pinned bridal robe, with over 2 million pins, on Pinterest.

Homebodii also has launched a sustainable fabric range that uses Tencel Modal fibers.
