= Broadbeach, Queensland =

Broadbeach
- Suburb
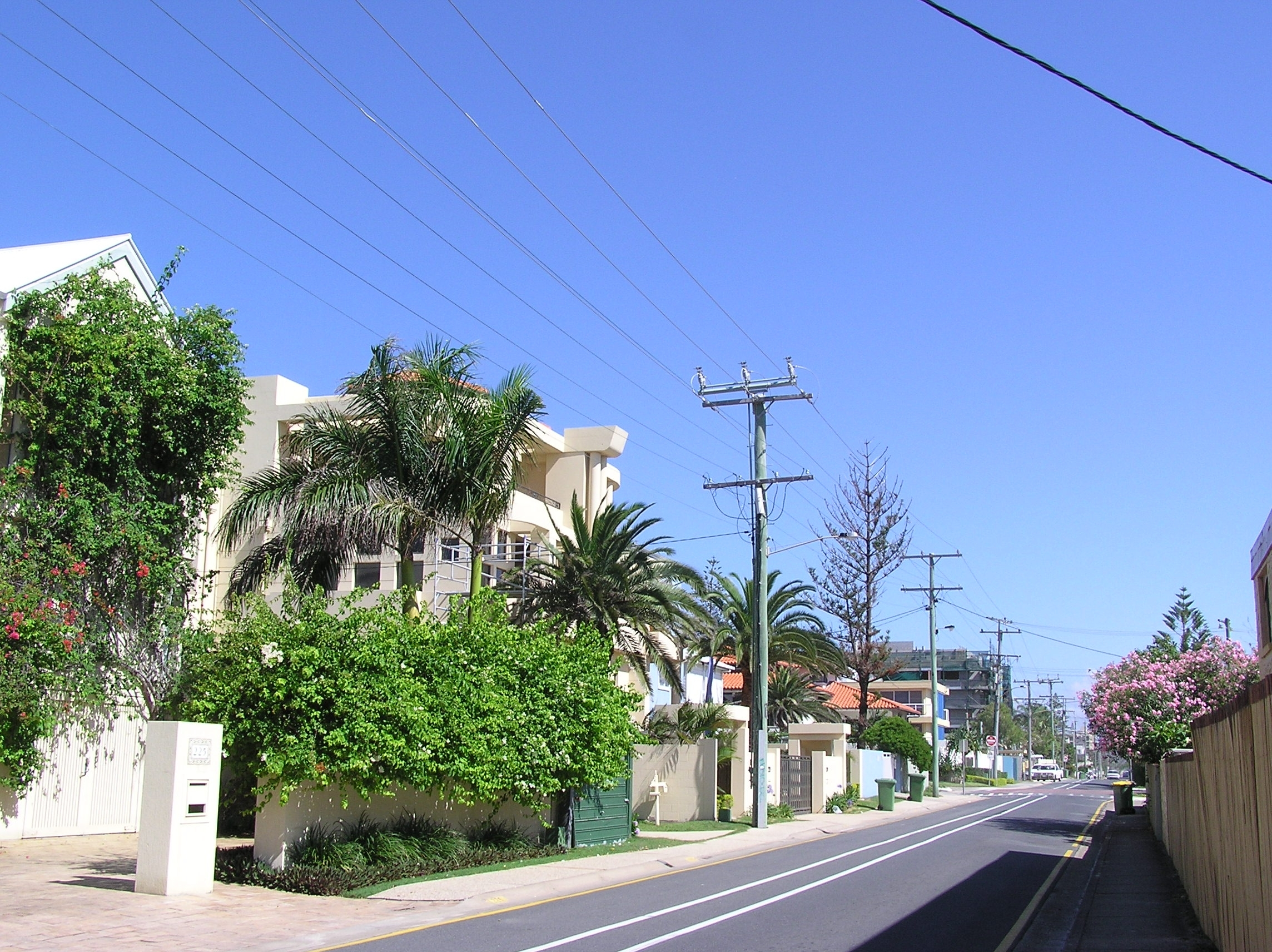
- Hedges Avenue, 2007

- Interactive map of Broadbeach
- Coordinates: 28.0272°S 153.4319°E
- Country: Australia
- State: Queensland
- City: Gold Coast
- LGA: City of Gold Coast
- Location: 4.3 km (2.7 mi) SSE of Surfers Paradise; 8.2 km (5.1 mi) S of Southport; 82.8 km (51.4 mi) SSE of Brisbane CBD; 27 km (17 mi) N of Tweed Heads

Government
  - State electorates: Surfers Paradise; Mermaid Beach
  - Federal division: Moncrieff

Area
  - Total: 1.4 km^{2} (0.54 sq mi)
- Elevation: 13 m (43 ft)

Population
  - Total: 6,786 (2021 census)
  - Density: 4,850/km^{2} (12,600/sq mi)
- Time zone: UTC+10:00 (AEST)
- Postcode: 4218
Suburbs around Broadbeach
Broadbeach Waters	Surfers Paradise	Coral Sea
Broadbeach Waters	Broadbeach	Coral Sea
Mermaid Waters	Mermaid Beach	Coral Sea

Broadbeach is a suburb in the City of Gold Coast, Queensland, Australia. In the 2021 census, Broadbeach had a population of 6,786 people.

== History ==
For thousands of years prior to British colonisation the Broadbeach area was home to the Kombumerri clan of Aboriginal Australians. A large burial ground of these people, which was in use from around 1,300 years ago up til the 1800s, was located at nearby Mermaid Waters.

In circa 1924, 70 allotments were advertised as "Mermaid Beach Estate" located at Mermaid Beach and Broadbeach to be auctioned by R. G. Oates Estates. The estate map has 3 estates for sale at Mermaid Beach and Broadbeach. The estates were divided in two by the "New Coastal Road" running through the Gold Coast.

While residential housing lots were selling successfully in the state government developed Broadbeach township from 1934, and the area had good bitumen roads that were described as 'speedways' in newspaper reports, it wasn't until the construction of Lennon's Broadbeach Hotel (now the site of the Oasis Hotel and Shopping Centre) in 1955–1956 that development of the area as a holiday destination began to increase.

Broadbeach State School opened on 16 May 1960.

== Demographics ==
Historical population
Year	Pop.	±%
2006	3,791	—
2011	4,614	+21.7%
2016	5,514	+19.5%
2021	6,786	+23.1%

In the 2016 census, Broadbeach recorded a population of 5,514 people, The median age of the Broadbeach population was 41 years, higher than the national median of 38. 51.0% of people were born in Australia. The next most common countries of birth were New Zealand 7.0% and England 4.7%. 66.8% of people spoke only English at home. The most common responses for religion were No Religion 31.0% and Catholic 20.3%.

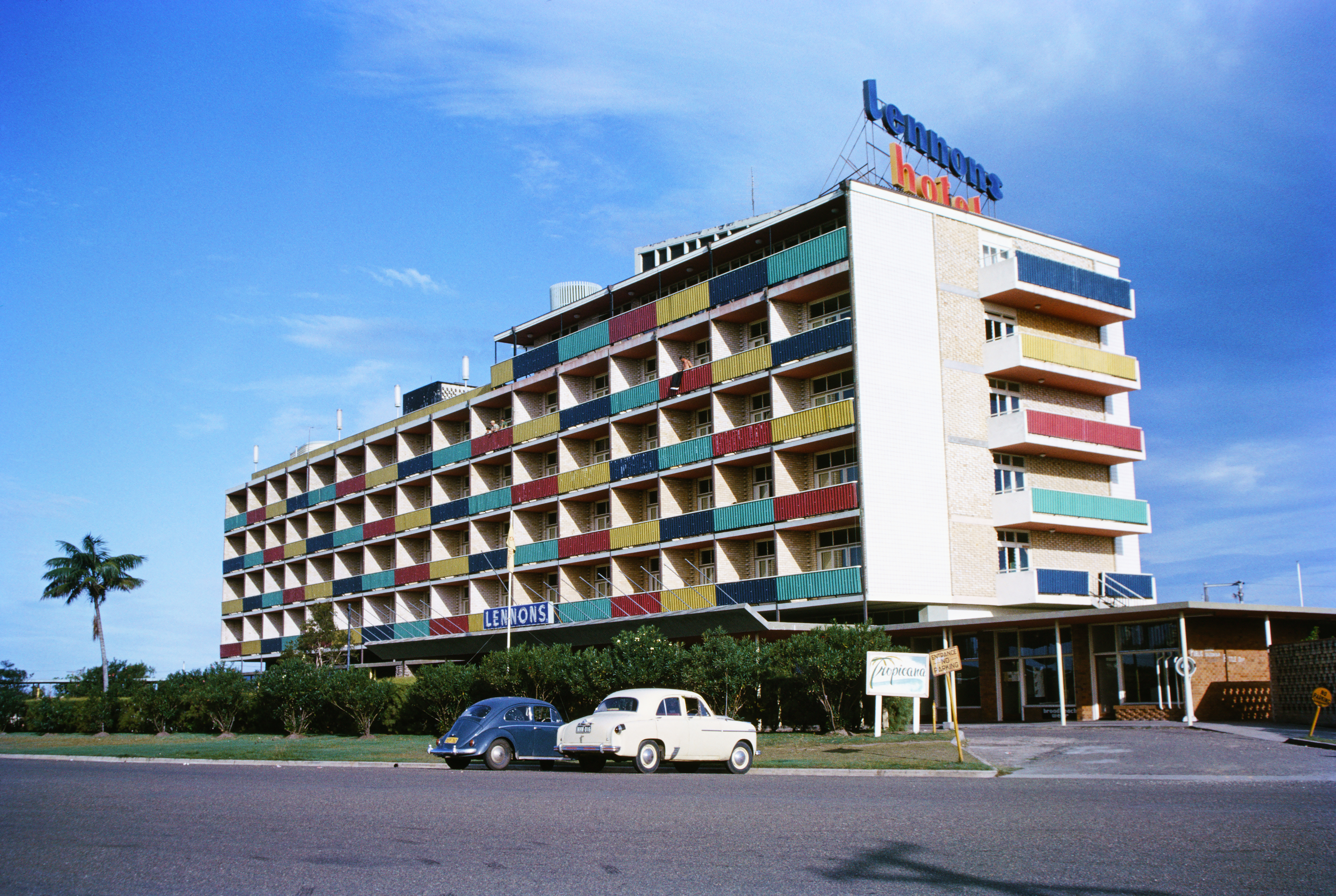
Lennons Hotel, Broadbeach, May 1964

In the 2021 census, Broadbeach had a population of 6,786 people. The median age of the Broadbeach population was 46 years, higher than the national median of 38. 54.1% of people were born in Australia. The next most common countries of birth were New Zealand 5.7% and England 4.6%. 70.1% of people spoke only English at home. The most common responses for religion were no religion (38.1%) and Catholic 19.4%.

== Heritage listings ==
There are a number of heritage sites in Broadbeach, including:

- Seal Sculpture by Len Shillam, 2684 Gold Coast Highway (Gold Coast Convention and Exhibition Centre), having been relocated from the former Lennon's Hotel, Broadbeach

=== Seal sculpture ===
In 1954 Len Shillam was commissioned to create a water fountain feature for the pool of Lennon's Hotel at Broadbeach (the first large hotel on the Gold Coast). He created a lifesize sculpture of a seal with its pup in polished terrazzo which became a much-photographed icon. After the demolition of the hotel in 1987, the sculpture was relocated to a jetty at the Sakura Japanese gardens restaurant. It later disappeared but was found at that bottom of a canal. After it was retrieved by Conrad Jupiters Casino and Bond University, it was restored and donated to the National Trust of Australia. It is now at the entrance of the Gold Coast Convention and Exhibition Centre, a short distance from the former Lennon's Hotel.

=== Aboriginal burial ground ===
In 1965, building works unearthed what was found to be an Aboriginal burial ground. An archaeological dig commenced under Laila Haglund, who was under the supervision of the University of Queensland, and the remains of more than 150 Aboriginal people of the Kombumerri clan of the Yugambeh people were moved. It was established that the people had been buried from up to 1000 years ago until the late 1800s. The excavation report was published in 1976, and described as "pioneer archaeological research". Haglund earned an MA from the University of Queensland and a PhD from Stockholm University for her work on the site.

In 1988, the remains were repatriated to the Gold Coast Aboriginal community, and reburied at Kombumerri Park not far from the original burial ground. This event played an important role in the development of the state's first cultural heritage legislation, the Aboriginal Relics Preservation Act 1967 (later superseded by another Act, followed by the current Aboriginal Cultural Heritage Act 2003), which recognises the status of Indigenous Australians as the "primary guardians, keepers and knowledge holders of Australia’s ancient cultures". The event was commemorated on its 50th anniversary in 2015, hosted by the Queensland Government and the Gold Coast Historical Society, with Haglund a key speaker.

== Education ==
Broadbeach State School is a government primary (Prep–6) school for boys and girls on Alexandra Avenue (28.0357°S 153.4345°E). In 2017, the school had an enrolment of 895 students with 52 teachers (48 full-time equivalent) and 34 non-teaching staff (23 full-time equivalent). In 2018, the school had an enrolment of 947 students with 58 teachers (53 full-time equivalent) and 36 non-teaching staff (23 full-time equivalent). It includes a special education program.

There is no secondary school in Broadbeach. The nearest government secondary school is Merrimac State High School in neighbouring Mermaid Waters.

== Amenities ==
The Broadbeach Surf Life Saving Club patrols the beach in the centre of the suburb.

Despite being called the Broadbeach Library, the Gold Coast City Council operates this public library at 61 Sunshine Boulevard in neighbouring Mermaid Waters. It opened in 2008.

There are a number of parks in the suburb, including:

- Broadbeach Park (28.0217°S 153.4321°E)
- Cascade Gardens (28.0204°S 153.4275°E)
- Federation Park (28.0270°S 153.4319°E)
- Gold Coast Bulletin Centenary Park (28.0313°S 153.4299°E)
- Herb Fennell & Noel Watson Memorial Picnic Area (28.0191°S 153.4278°E)
- Kurrawa Park (28.0275°S 153.4346°E)
- Mermaid Esplanade (28.0378°S 153.4368°E)
- Moya Egerton Park (28.0362°S 153.4308°E)
- Pratten Park (28.0329°S 153.4355°E)
- Royal Queensland Art Society (28.0218°S 153.4335°E)
- Victoria Park (28.0300°S 153.4308°E)

== Attractions ==
The area is also home to The Star Gold Coast (formerly Jupiters Hotel and Casino Gold Coast, 28.0321°S 153.4287°E), the Gold Coast Convention & Exhibition Centre (28.0279°S 153.4286°E), and the Oasis Shopping Centre (28.0297°S 153.4318°E).

== Transport ==
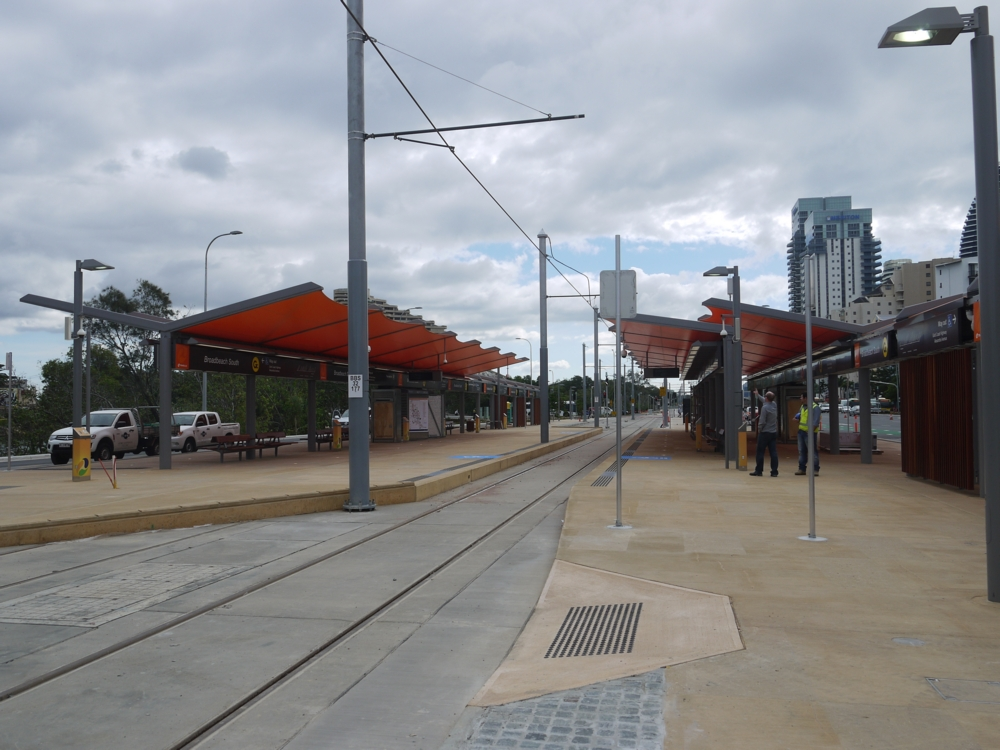
Broadbeach South G:link Station, located on the corner of Gold Coast Highway and Hooker Boulevard provides bus and tram connections.

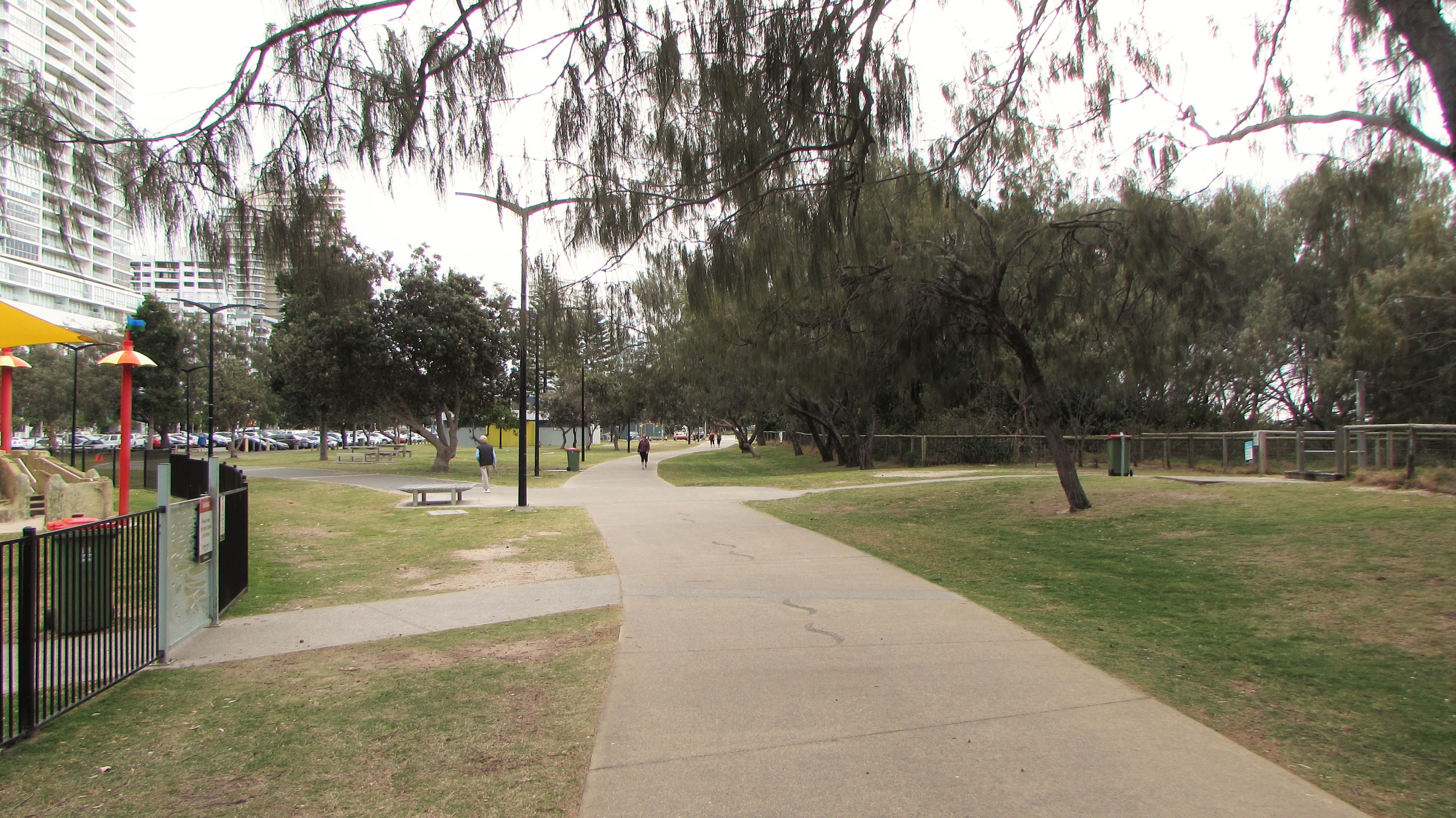
Gold Coast Oceanway, 2015

== See also ==
- List of Gold Coast suburbs
