= Mermaid Waters, Queensland =

Mermaid Waters
- Suburb
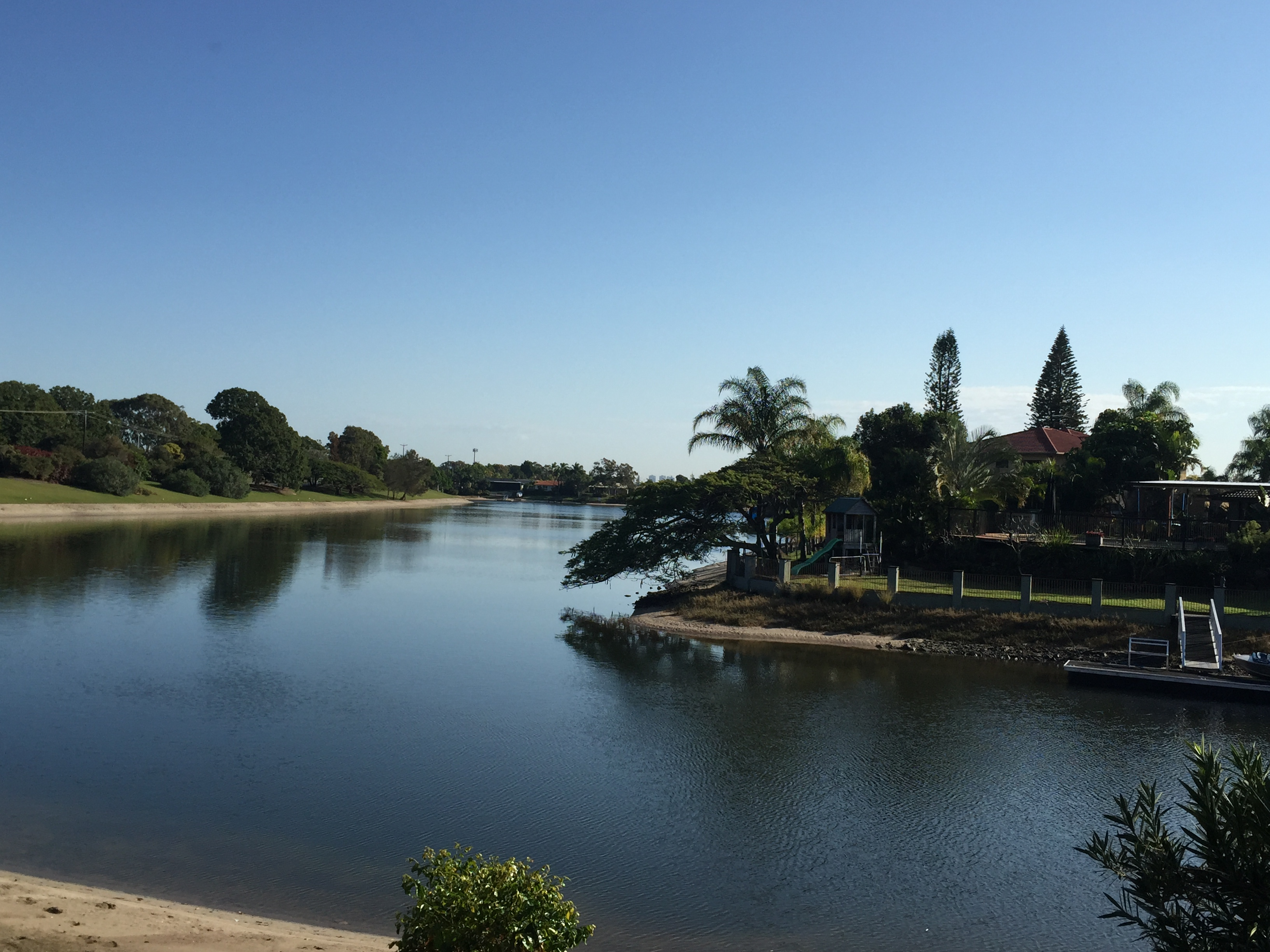
- Canal and homes in 2015

- Interactive map of Mermaid Waters
- Coordinates: 28.0497°S 153.4230°E
- Country: Australia
- State: Queensland
- City: Gold Coast
- LGA: Gold Coast City
- Location: 6.8 km (4.2 mi) S of Surfers Paradise; 82.8 km (51.4 mi) SSE of Brisbane; 10 km (6.2 mi) S of Southport; 25 km (16 mi) NNW of Tweed Heads

Government
  - State electorate: Mermaid Beach
  - Federal division: Moncrieff

Area
  - Total: 7.1 km^{2} (2.7 sq mi)
- Elevation: 5 m (16 ft)

Population
  - Total: 13,088 (2021 census)
  - Density: 1,843/km^{2} (4,770/sq mi)
- Time zone: UTC+10:00 (AEST)
- Postcode: 4218
Suburbs around Mermaid Waters
Clear Island Waters	Broadbeach Waters	Broadbeach
Robina	Mermaid Waters	Mermaid Beach
Robina	Burleigh Waters	Miami

Mermaid Waters is a suburb in the City of Gold Coast, Queensland, Australia. In the 2021 census, Mermaid Waters had a population of 13,088 people.

== Geography ==
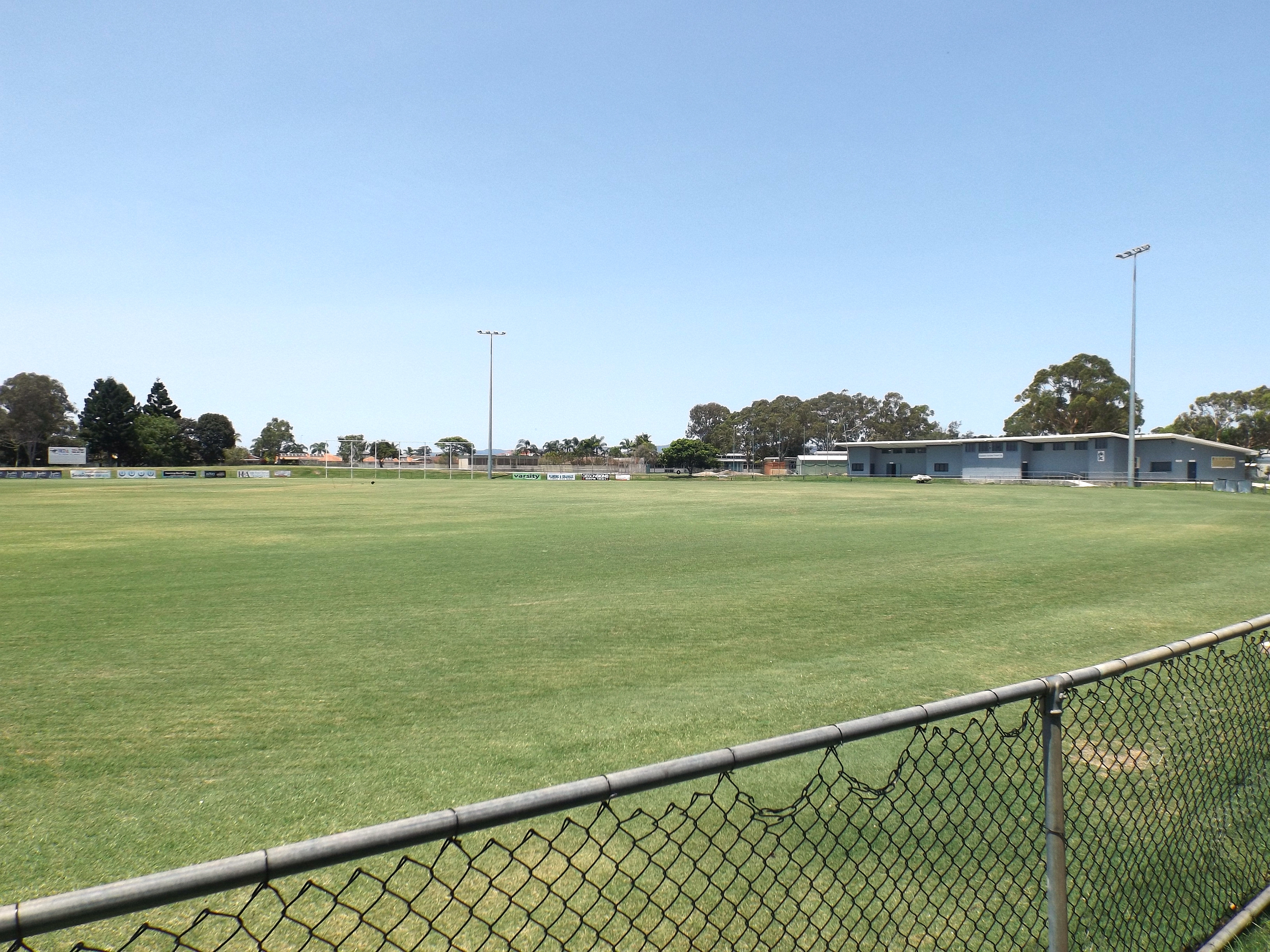
H & A Oval, 2015

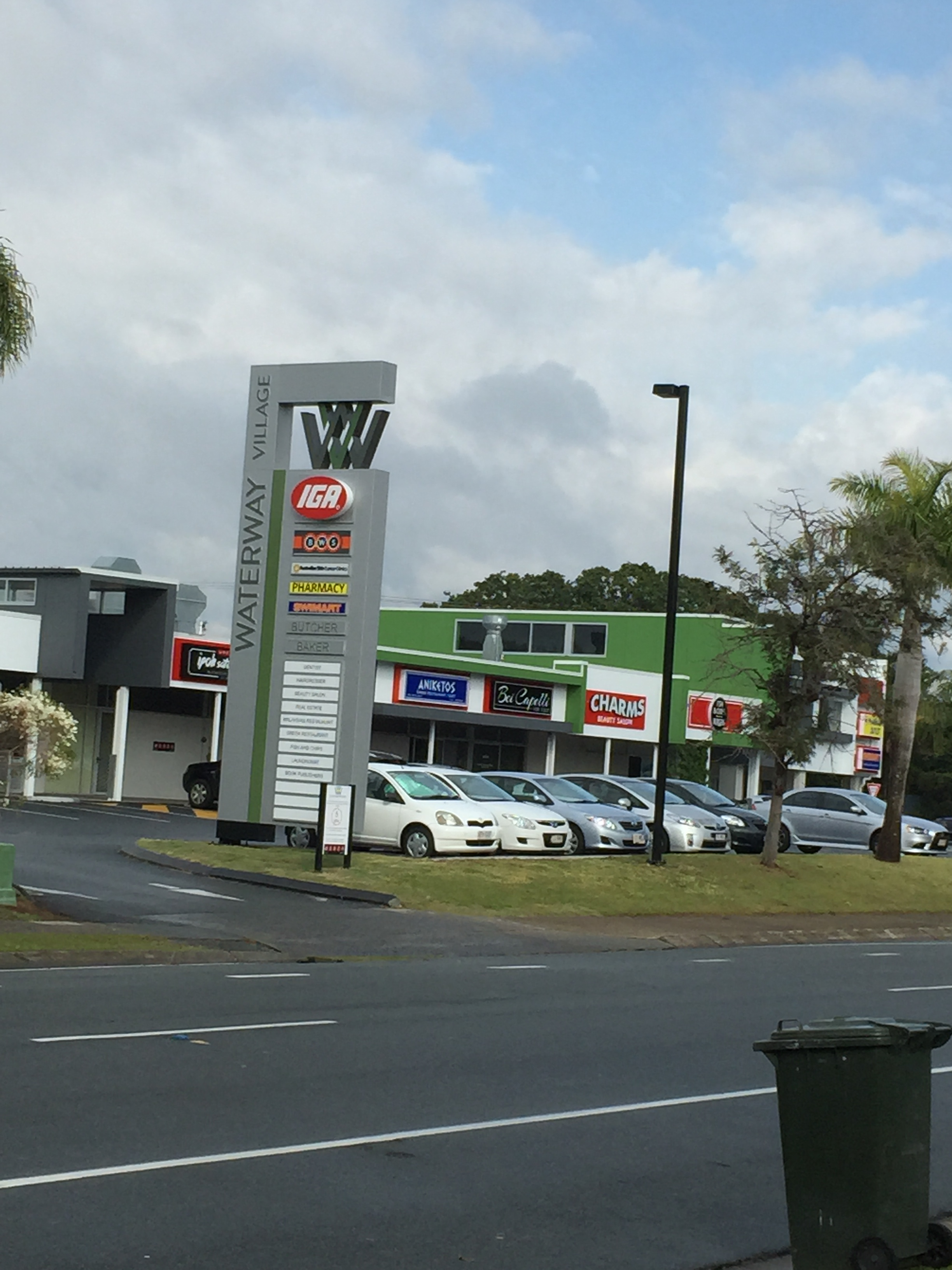
One of the two small-sized shopping centres located in Mermaid Waters.

Mermaid Waters is primarily a residential suburb, featuring many homes built along artificial canals and lakes, including the 17-hectare (42-acre) fresh water Lake Hugh Muntz.

== History ==
The suburb derives its name from HMS Mermaid, a cutter ship that brought Australian surveyor John Oxley to the region in 1823. Oxley named the area where he landed "Mermaid Beach". The adjacent area to the west eventually became known as "Mermaid Waters".

Miami State School and Merrimac State High School both opened on 30 January 1979.

The Broadbeach Library (located in Mermaid Waters) opened in 2008.

== Demographics ==
In the 2011 census, Mermaid Waters had a population of 11,789 people.

In the 2016 census, Mermaid Waters had a population of 12,045 people.

In the 2021 census, Mermaid Waters had a population of 13,088 people.

== Shopping ==
There are two small local shopping centres in Mermaid Waters, and a medium-sized shopping centre, Q Super Centre, in the western parts of the suburb, with new retail and commercial developments being established in the adjacent area. Nearby Pacific Fair in Broadbeach Waters is one of the largest shopping centres in the Gold Coast.

== Education ==
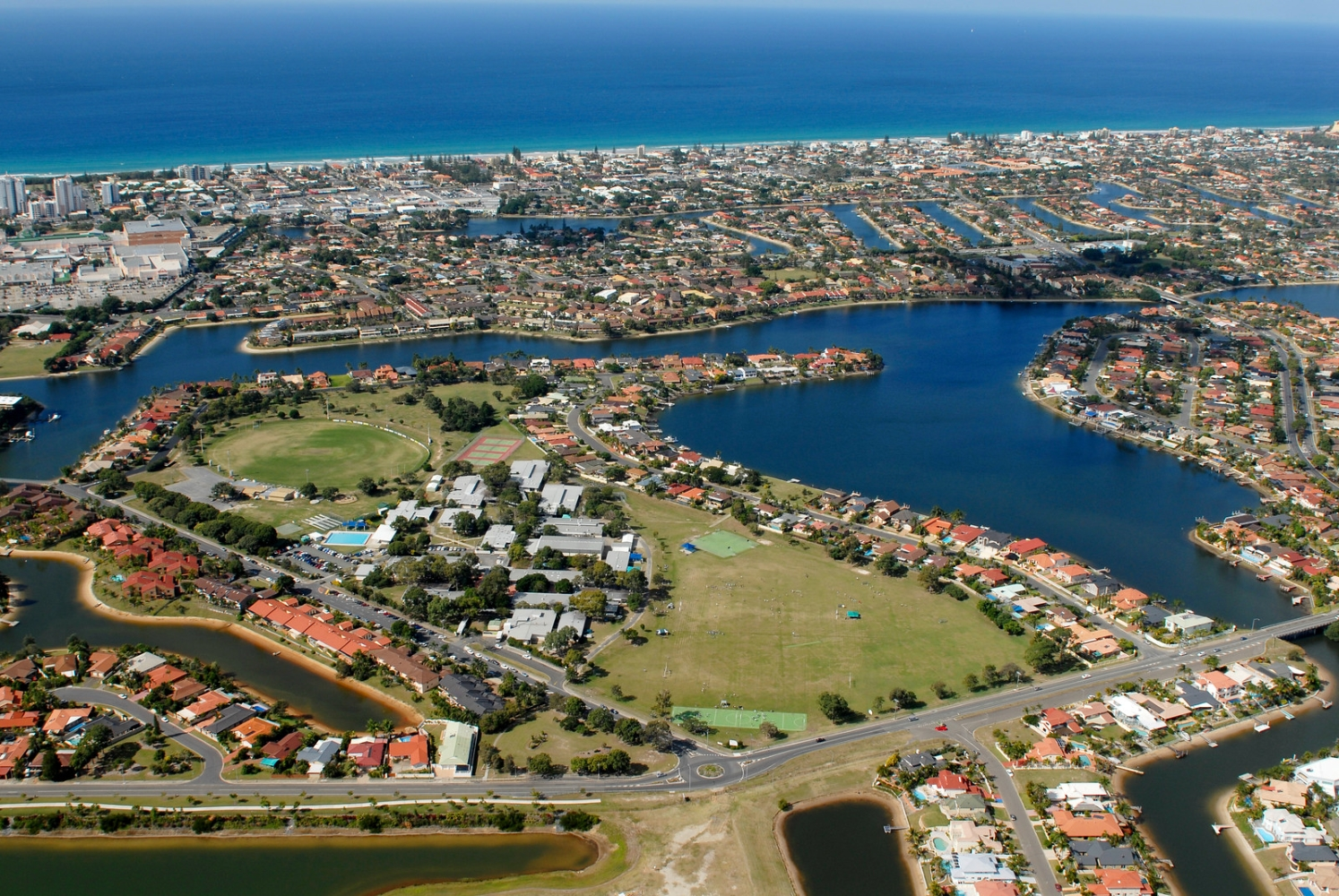
Aerial view of Merrimac State High School, 2006

Miami State School is a government primary (Early Childhood to Year 6) school for boys and girls at 18-36 Oceanic Drive (28.0596°S 153.4260°E). In 2017, the school had an enrolment of 819 students with 64 teachers (55 full-time equivalent) and 43 non-teaching staff (27 full-time equivalent). The school includes a special education program.

Merrimac State High School is a government secondary (7–12) school for boys and girls at Dunlop Court (28.0398°S 153.4163°E). In 2017, the school had an enrolment of 1208 students with 103 teachers (96 full-time equivalent) and 57 non-teaching staff (43 full-time equivalent). It includes a special education program.

== Amenities ==
Albert Waterways Community Hall is at the northern end of the suburb. Immediately adjacent is the Broadbeach Library, which despite its name is located in Mermaid Waters, opposite Pacific Fair. A customer service centre for the Gold Coast City Council is part of this precinct.

Another community hall is located on the grounds of Miami State Primary School.

Pizzey Park Sports Complex hosts a variety of sports and clubs in the southern Gold Coast. Adjacent to the complex is the Miami Olympic Swimming Pool.
