= Electoral district of Mermaid Beach =

State electoral district of Queensland, Australia

Mermaid Beach Queensland—Legislative Assembly
- Map of the electoral district of Mermaid Beach 2017
- State: Queensland
- Dates current: 2009–present
- MP: Ray Stevens
- Party: Liberal National
- Namesake: Mermaid Beach
- Electors: 35,823 (2020)
- Area: 23 km^{2} (8.9 sq mi)
- Demographic: Inner-metropolitan
- Coordinates: 28°3′S 153°25′E
Electorates around Mermaid Beach:
Mudgeeraba	Surfers Paradise	Coral Sea
Mudgeeraba	Mermaid Beach	Coral Sea
Mudgeeraba	Burleigh	Coral Sea

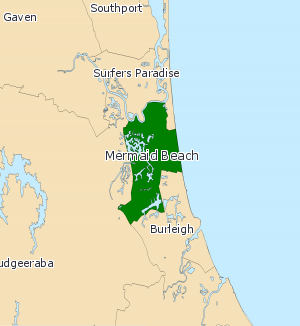
2008 map

Mermaid Beach is an electoral district of the Legislative Assembly in the Australian state of Queensland. The district is based in the southern part of the Gold Coast.

== Geography ==
A compact urban, coastal electorate, Mermaid Beach includes the Gold Coast suburbs of Mermaid Beach, Mermaid Waters, Broadbeach Waters, Merrimac, Miami and parts of Robina.

== History ==
Essentially a new name for the former district of Robina, Mermaid Beach was first created for the 2009 state election. Its inaugural member is Ray Stevens, previously the member for Robina.

== Members for Mermaid Beach ==
Member	Party	Term
Ray Stevens	Liberal National	2009–present

== Election results ==
2024 Queensland state election: Mermaid Beach
Party	Candidate	Votes	%	±%
Liberal National	Ray Stevens	15,762	51.48	+7.41
Labor	Joseph Shiels	8,002	26.14	−4.35
Greens	Lucy Carra Schulz	3,331	10.88	+0.08
One Nation	Roger Marquass	2,097	6.85	+1.84
Family First	Clare Todd	1,423	4.65	+4.65
Total formal votes		30,615	94.53	+0.67
Informal votes		1,771	5.47	−0.67
Turnout		32,386	84.64	−0.42
Two-party-preferred result
Liberal National	Ray Stevens	19,331	63.14	+8.75
Labor	Joseph Shiels	11,284	36.86	−8.75
Liberal National hold		Swing	+8.75	
