= Broadbeach Waters, Queensland =

Broadbeach Waters
- Suburb
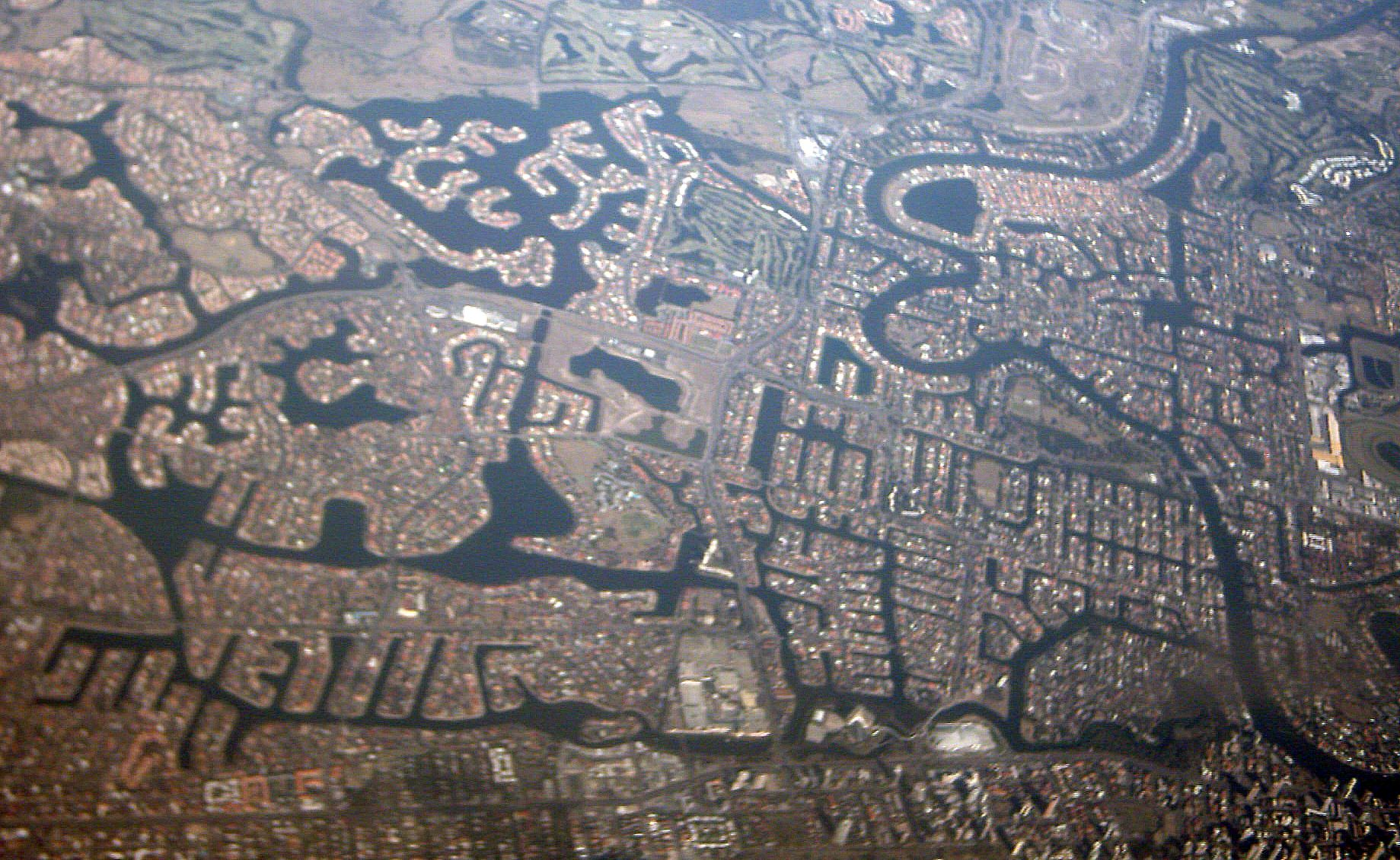
- Residential canals on the Gold Coast, including Broadbeach Waters

- Interactive map of Broadbeach Waters
- Coordinates: 28.0263°S 153.4172°E
- Country: Australia
- State: Queensland
- City: Gold Coast
- LGA: Gold Coast City
- Location: 3.8 km (2.4 mi) S of Surfers Paradise; 6.9 km (4.3 mi) S of Southport; 29 km (18 mi) NNW of Tweed Heads; 82.1 km (51.0 mi) SSE of Brisbane CBD

Government
  - State electorate: Surfers Paradise
  - Federal division: Moncrieff

Area
  - Total: 5.3 km^{2} (2.0 sq mi)
- Elevation: 4 m (13 ft)

Population
  - Total: 8,164 (2021 census)
  - Density: 1,540/km^{2} (3,990/sq mi)
- Time zone: UTC+10:00 (AEST)
- Postcode: 4218
Suburbs around Broadbeach Waters
| Benowa | Bundall | Surfers Paradise |
| Carrara | Broadbeach Waters | Broadbeach |
| Clear Island Waters | Mermaid Waters | Broadbeach |

Broadbeach Waters is a suburb in the City of Gold Coast, Queensland, Australia. In the 2021 census, Broadbeach Waters had a population of 8,164 people.

== Geography ==
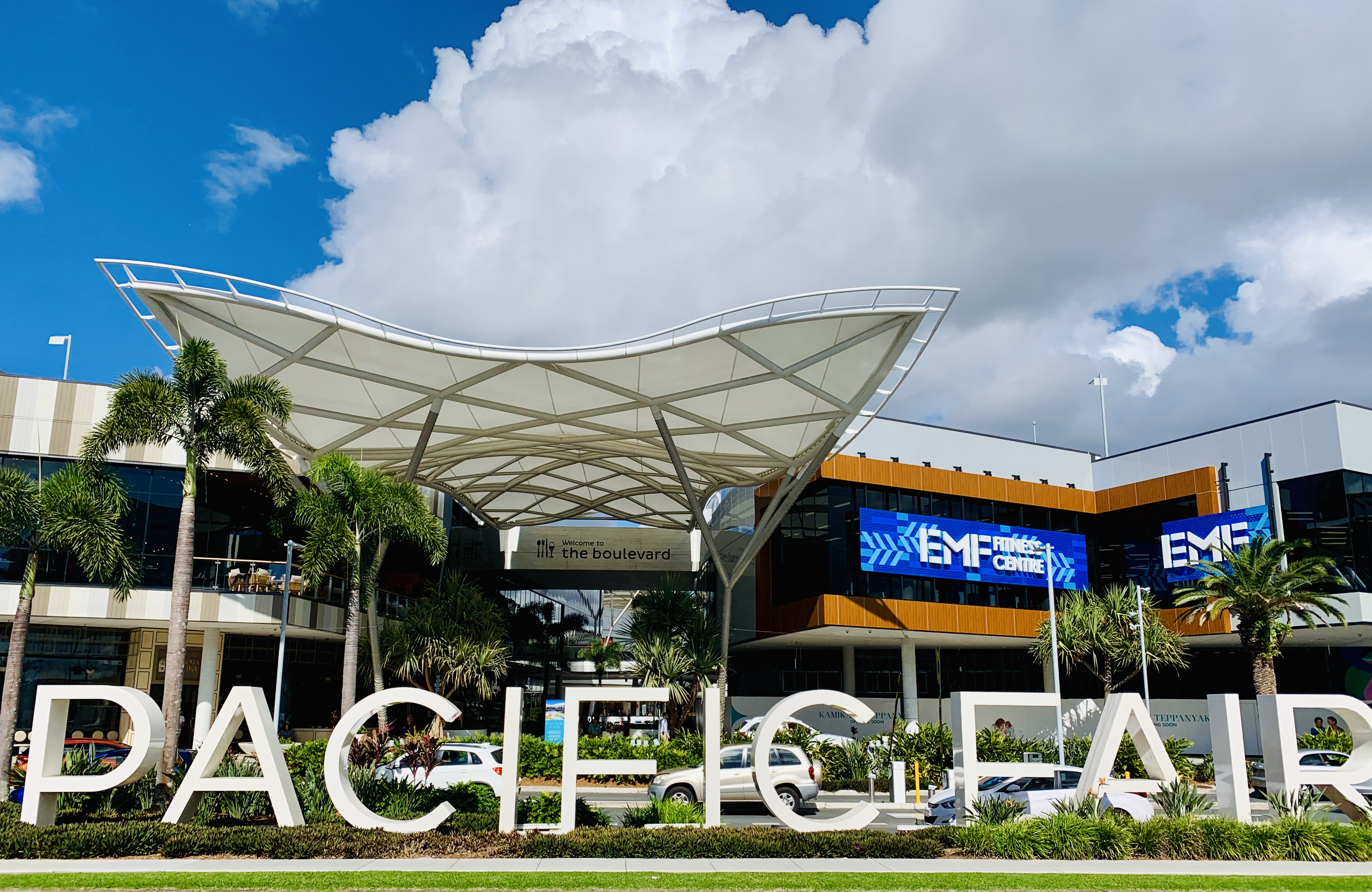
Pacific Fair Shopping centre

The northern boundary of Broadbeach Waters follows the Nerang River. The suburb is almost completed residential with most properties adjacent to or very close to man-made canals. Pacific Fair shopping centre is located in the south east corner of the suburb.

There are a number of neighbourhoods in the suburb:

- Cypress Gardens (28.0283°S 153.3974°E)
- Florida Gardens (28.0202°S 153.4247°E)
- Miami Keys (28.0344°S 153.4205°E)
- Moana (28.0253°S 153.4141°E)
- Rialto (28.0233°S 153.4094°E)
- Rio Vista (28.02°S 153.4161°E)

== History ==
The first canal estates on the Gold Coast were established in the 1950s in what is now Broadbeach Waters. These were Miami Keys and Rio Vista. Developers were influenced by Florida and commenced construction after visiting there.

== Demographics ==
In the 2016 census, Broadbeach Waters recorded a population of 7,779 people. The median age of the Broadbeach Waters population was 43 years, 5 years above the national median of 38. 65.2% of people were born in Australia. The most common countries of birth were New Zealand 7.3% and England 5.0%. 81.5% of people spoke only English at home. Other languages spoken at home included Mandarin at 1.7%. The most common responses for religion were No Religion 29.9%, Catholic 26.3% and Anglican 17.8%.

In the 2021 census, Broadbeach Waters had a population of 8,164 people.

== Education ==
There are no schools in Broadbeach Waters. The nearest government primary schools are Broadbeach State School in neighbouring Broadbeach to the south-east and Surfers Paradise State School in neighbouring Surfers Paradise to the north-east. The nearest government secondary school is Merrimac State High School in neighbouring Mermaid Waters to the south.

== Amenities ==
There are a number of parks in the suburb, including:

- Albert Recreational Park (28.0217°S 153.4092°E)
- Bauhinia Park (28.0227°S 153.4124°E)
- Bermuda Reserve (28.0336°S 153.4093°E)
- Bill Crompton Park (28.0184°S 153.4120°E)
- Boronia Park (28.0254°S 153.4276°E)
- Conifer Crescent Park (28.0316°S 153.4002°E)
- Cypress Drive Park (28.0312°S 153.4017°E)
- Darnay Road Reserves (28.0295°S 153.4097°E)
- Dick Hamilton Park (28.0315°S 153.4161°E)
- Doonbur North Reserve (28.0310°S 153.4109°E)
- Doonbur South Reserve (28.0321°S 153.4101°E)
- Fremar Street Drainage Reserve (28.0246°S 153.4090°E)
- Goolagong Park (28.0301°S 153.3911°E)
- Hart Park (28.0309°S 153.4039°E)
- Hibiscus Park (28.0220°S 153.4218°E)
- Ipsley Park (28.0292°S 153.4070°E)
- Jack Gaven Park (28.0296°S 153.4113°E)
- Jeff Munroe Park (28.0312°S 153.4198°E)
- John Davidson Park (28.0338°S 153.4167°E)
- Kalimna Drive Reserve (28.0254°S 153.4159°E)
- Kalimna Narrow Parkland (28.0242°S 153.4147°E)
- Lamb Street Reserve (28.0300°S 153.4049°E)
- Lorraine Yelland Park (28.0295°S 153.3942°E)
- Moana Park (28.0254°S 153.4140°E)
- Monaco Street Reserve (28.0179°S 153.4217°E)
- Passive Park (28.0309°S 153.3955°E)
- Pat Gilbert Park (28.0358°S 153.4181°E)
- Platell Park (28.0196°S 153.4257°E)
- Sons And Daughters Park (28.0189°S 153.4123°E)
- T E Peters Parklands (28.0275°S 153.4263°E)
- Tanhah Ct Reserve (28.0320°S 153.4096°E)
- Tui Johnson Park (28.0166°S 153.4138°E)
- Villa Court Lake (28.0307°S 153.4073°E)

== Attractions ==
Pacific Fair, the largest shopping centre on the Gold Coast is located on Hooker Boulevard in Broadbeach Waters, not far from the intersection on the Gold Coast Highway. As a result of several redevelopments over the years Pacific Fair boasts over 400 specialty stores, five anchor department stores, two supermarkets, two food courts and a multi cinema complex. In January 2014 work began on re-developing and re-branding the shopping centre. $670 million was spent on expanding the centre with 120 new specialty stores, making the centre the fourth largest in Australia in 2016.

== See also ==
- Suburbs of the Gold Coast
