= Pacific Fair =

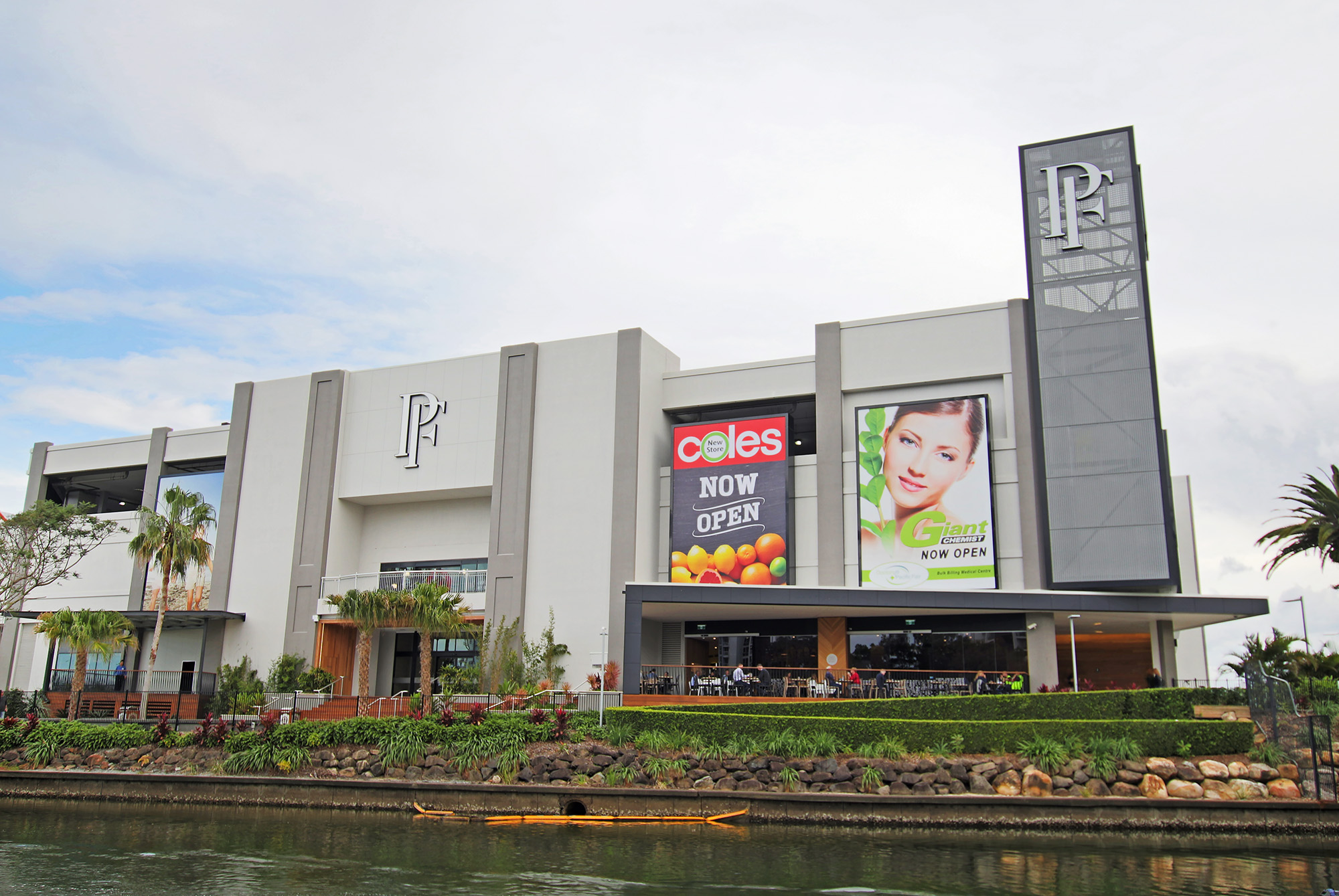
- North-east mall post mid 2010’s redevelopment
- Location: Broadbeach Waters, Queensland, Australia
- Coordinates: 28°02′10″S 153°25′38″E
- Address: 32 Hooker Blvd, Broadbeach Waters QLD 4218
- Opened: 23 August 1977; 49 years ago
- Developer: Hooker
- Manager: GPT Group
- Owner: Australian Core Retail Trust (ACRT)
- Num. of stores: 370
- Num. of anchor tenants: 8
- Floor area: 151,000 m^{2} (1,625,350 sq ft)
- Floors: 2
- Parking: 6,500 spaces
- Public transit: Light rail, bus
- Website: www.pacificfair.com.au/

Pacific Fair is a major shopping centre in Broadbeach Waters on the Gold Coast.

== Transport ==
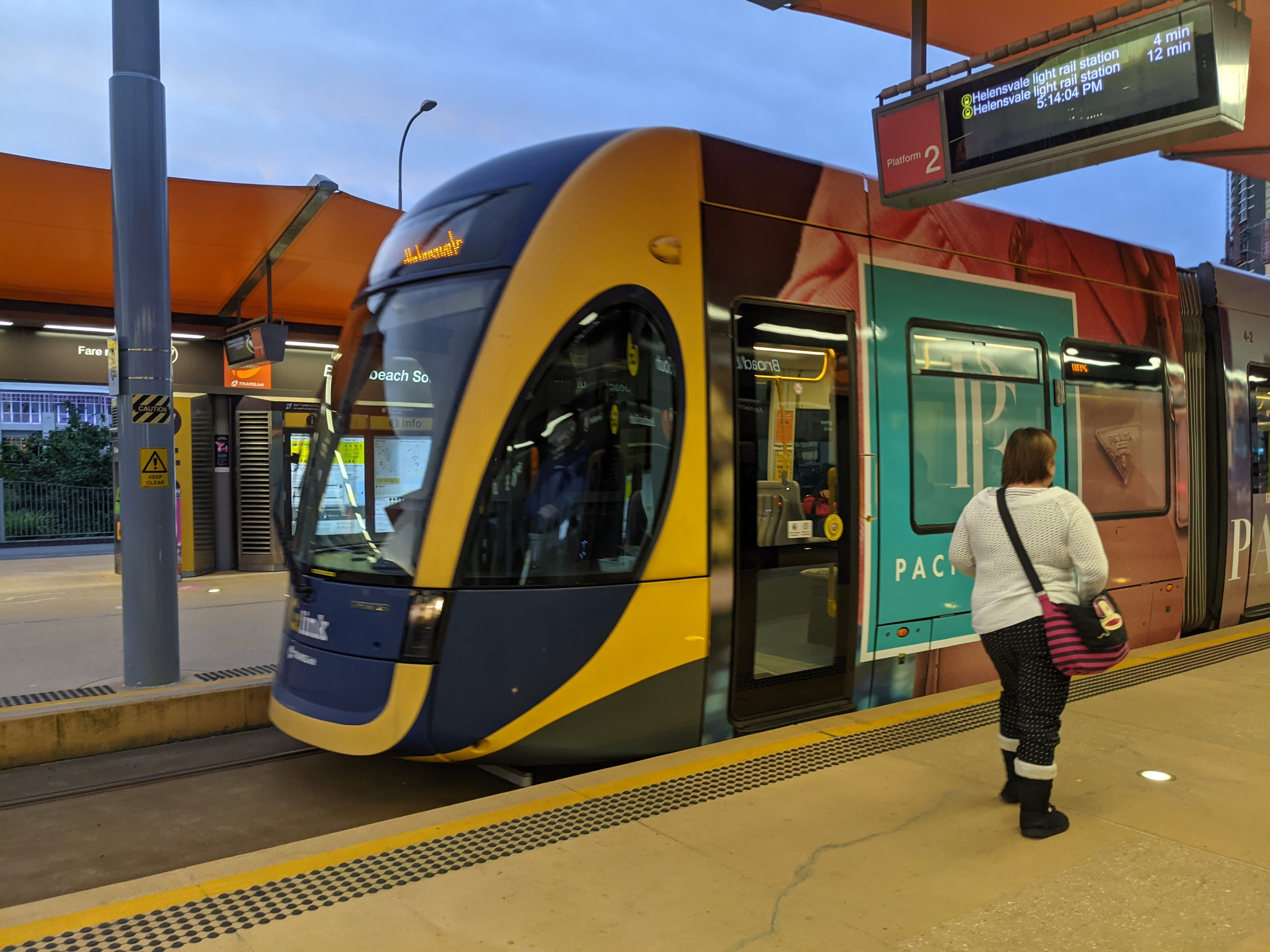
Broadbeach South bus station is located next to Pacific Fair and provides bus and tram connections.

Pacific Fair bus station has connections to Robina, Nerang and SeaWorld/Main Beach, Tweed Heads and the Gold Coast University Hospital. It is served by Kinetic Gold Coast

Broadbeach South light rail station on the G:link light rail line is a short walk from Pacific Fair and provides tram connections north to the Gold Coast University Hospital via Surfers Paradise, Main Beach and Southport.

Pacific Fair Free Shopping Shuttle operates daily transfers for customers as far north as Main Beach to Pacific Fair.

Pacific Fair has multi-level carparks with 6,500 spaces.

== History ==
=== 20th century ===
==== Mid-1970s: construction ====
Before the construction of Pacific Fair in May 1976 the land was formerly swampland on the western bank of Little Tallebudgera Creek in Broadbeach Waters. Plans for Pacific Fair were first drawn up in 1963; however it was put on hold through the late 1960s. With the opening of Sundale Shopping Centre in Southport which was the largest shopping centre in Queensland at that time, plans for Pacific Fair resumed in the 1970s.

Hooker Retail Developments was responsible for the development of the centre, which was designed by the company’s English-born state manager, John C. Barrett and architect “Big” Bill Job. The design of the centre was inspired by Disneyland after Job spent two months in the US, Canada, Sweden and the UK to inspect cutting edge shopping centres. Construction of Pacific Fair took 16 months to complete and costed around $17 million.

==== Late 1970s: opening ====
Pacific Fair opened on 23 August 1977 and featured McDonnell & East department store, Kmart discount department store, Coles supermarket and 96 specialty stores. Since its opening in 1977 it surpassed the now-demolished Sundale Shopping Centre in Southport as the Gold Coast's leading shopping centre.

Pacific Fair's original 17ha site featured a themed, outdoor design, including mock-Tudor buildings and European thoroughfares, Asian villages with fish ponds, and a French Quarter.

In 1978 Pacific Fair was sold to AMP Capital with Hooker Developments having still retained the management of the centre.

==== 1980s ====
Pacific Fair underwent its first redevelopment in 1982 with the opening of Myer department store, a new enlarged relocated Coles supermarket and 32 specialty stores.

A $200 million redevelopment was announced in 1987 and a further $160 million was announced in 1989 to expand the centre by 87,500m². This redevelopment included the construction of pink turrets on the roof tops overlooking Little Tallebudgera Creek.

In 1989 a bridge was built across Little Tallebudgera Creek to improve access to the centre and the Gold Coast Highway.

==== 1990s ====
The first stage of the development opened in 1990 and was known as The Village. It saw the old teepees and kiosks in the centre replaced by an indoor two-level mall.

The last stages of the redevelopment were complete in 1992 with the pink facade built on the roof tops, in which Pacific Fair became known as the 'Pink Palace'. It also saw the opening of the newly relocated four-level Myer department store which featured a central atrium and waterfall with a large skylight and glass-backed lifts which allowed shoppers a view over the coastal strip. The old Myer building became a two-level enclosed mall which opened in October 1992.

In January 1994, the McDonnell & East department store ceased trading. This store was replaced by Target on the ground floor which opened in August and Toys "R" Us on the first level which opened in September.

In 1997 12-screen Birch Carroll & Coyle Cinema opened with special screening of the special edition re-release of the 1977 film Star Wars. More than 3000 people attended that event at the cinema on its opening day.

On 21 September 1998, the Japanese department store chain Daimaru opened after a $40m expansion of the centre. Despite having signed a lease on that section of the centre until 2024, the chain exited the Australian market entirely and the store was closed with only just over 3 years of trade on 31 January 2002.

=== 21st century ===
==== 2000s ====
In 2002 Rebel Sport opened its store in the centre.

To keep up with the population growth on the Gold Coast and continued growth in domestic and international tourism and as well competition from nearby centres such as Robina Town Centre, AMP Capital Partners and Westfield Group lodged a DA application to Gold Coast City Council in September 2007 to expand the total retail floor area by 83,372m² and add 1700 car spaces. The redevelopment proposal was to add a basement car park, an expanded replaced rooftop carpark, new mini majors, a second supermarket, specialty stores across two levels, a new cinema complex and after-hours dining options. Work on the redevelopment was expected to begin in mid 2008. However due to the Global financial crisis the plans on hold until 2013.

==== 2010s ====
In January 2014, work began on stage one of the major $670 million redevelopment and re-branding of Pacific Fair to meet the predicted regional growth on the Gold Coast. The well-known pink turreted structures on the roof were removed and replaced with a new facade. Much of the central outdoor alameda was demolished and replaced with an indoor complex. The centre's lotus flower logos were replaced with a simple logo of intertwined initials.

In November 2014, the first stage of the re-development was completed with the re-opening of the north-east mall (formerly Daimaru department store), with a new enlarged relocated Target on the first floor and a new JB Hi Fi Home store on the ground level.

Stage two of the redevelopment was completed by late June 2015. A section of the new south-west mall opened which featured a new relocated enlarged Coles supermarket on the previous site of Target, Toys "R" Us and Babies "R" Us (which opened on 25 June), 12 specialty stores and a new carpark.

Stage three saw more of the new south-west mall opening on 20 August 2015, bringing in a new Woolworths supermarket, new Big W, new Rebel, 20 stores in the 'Fresh Food Market' area and around 20 specialty stores. This development stage occupies the southwest corner are situated on the site of the previous cinemas.

The Event Cinemas reopened with three Gold Class cinemas and one VMax theatre on 5 November 2015 and The Patio, a casual dining precinct featuring 12 new dining outlets on 12 November 2015 as part of stage four. The Patio links the area from near Kmart to level one retailers in the new southwest mall near Big W.

The final stage of the $670 million redevelopment was completed by 5 May 2016. This included the opening of 'The Resort' area an open-air retail precinct, filled with four water fountains, palm trees and cabanas along with an extended mall section. 'The Resort' leisure section occupies the previous site of Coles. The two-level David Jones department store was opened by model and TV personality Jesinta Campbell. A number of international brands such as H&M, Uniqlo and Sephora have also opened. The opening of the Louis Vuitton store marks what was formerly a Warner Bros Studio Store.

A two-level Zara store opened on 13 October 2016 and Culture Kings opened on 1 December 2016.

The expansion has added 120 specialty stores and increased the total number of specialty stores to more than 400.

==== Ownership ====
In September 2021, Dexus Wholesale Property Fund has offered a 20 percent interest in the stakes held by AMP Capital. AMP has also introduced UniSuper and Cbus Property to ACRT as part of its stake in October. The management of Pacific Fair has been transferred from ACRT to GPT Group in September 2022.

== Tenants ==
Pacific Fair has 166,000m² of floor space. The major retailers include David Jones, Myer, Big W, Kmart, Target, Coles, Woolworths, Cotton On, Culture Kings, H&M, Uniqlo, Zara, JB Hi-Fi, Rebel and Event Cinemas.

== Incidents and accidents ==
- On 3 August 2016, a 61-year-old woman died after an accident in the carpark involving a boom gate. It is believed the woman accidentally accelerated instead of putting the car into park after opening her door to try to get her parking ticket out of the recently installed machine and smacked her head onto the steel ticket machine.
- On 9 March 2024, a 21-year-old woman was stabbed just outside of the centre at around 8:30am by a 32-year-old man who tried to befriend her after she got off the tram. The man has been charged since.

== Gallery ==
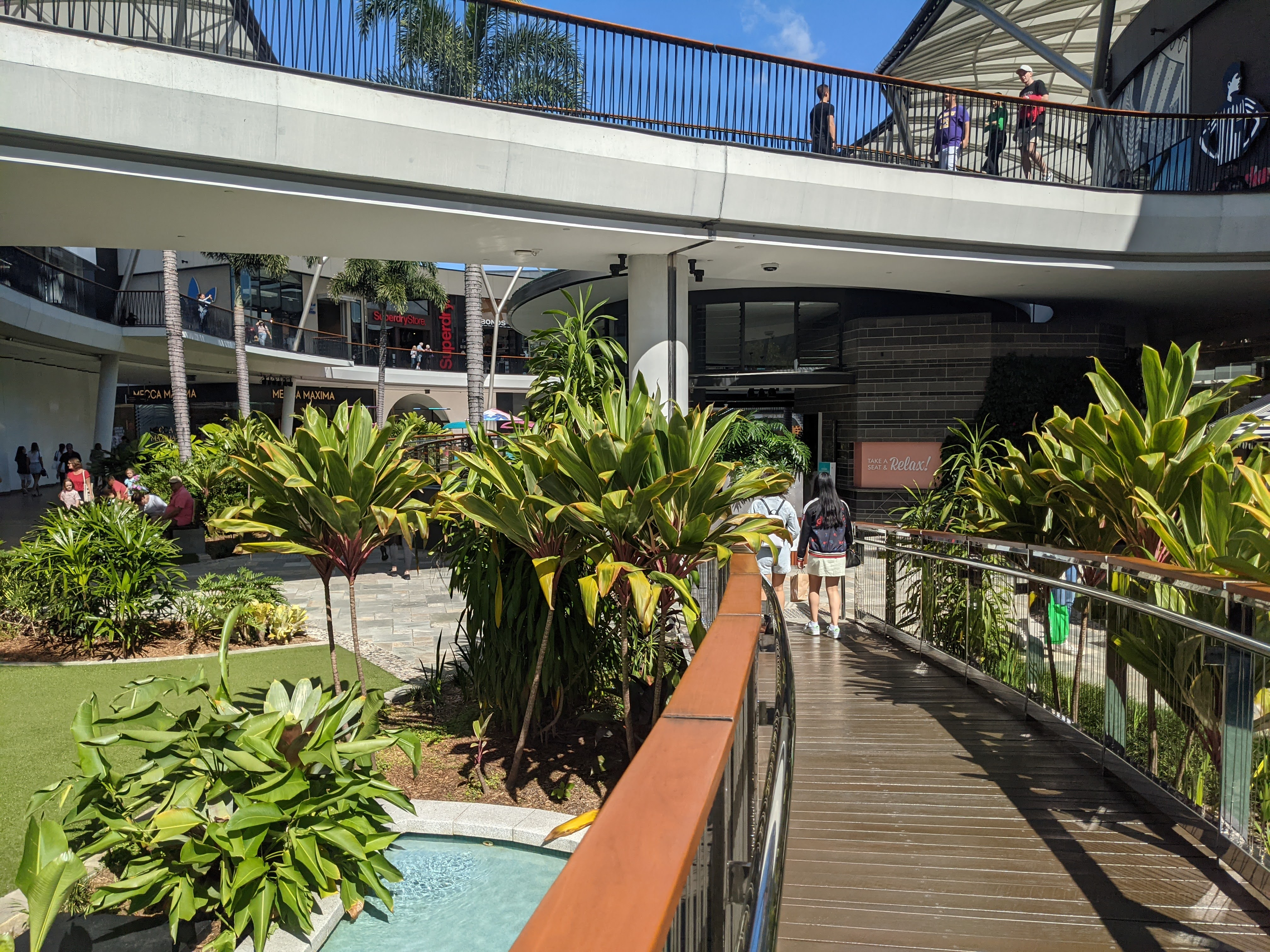

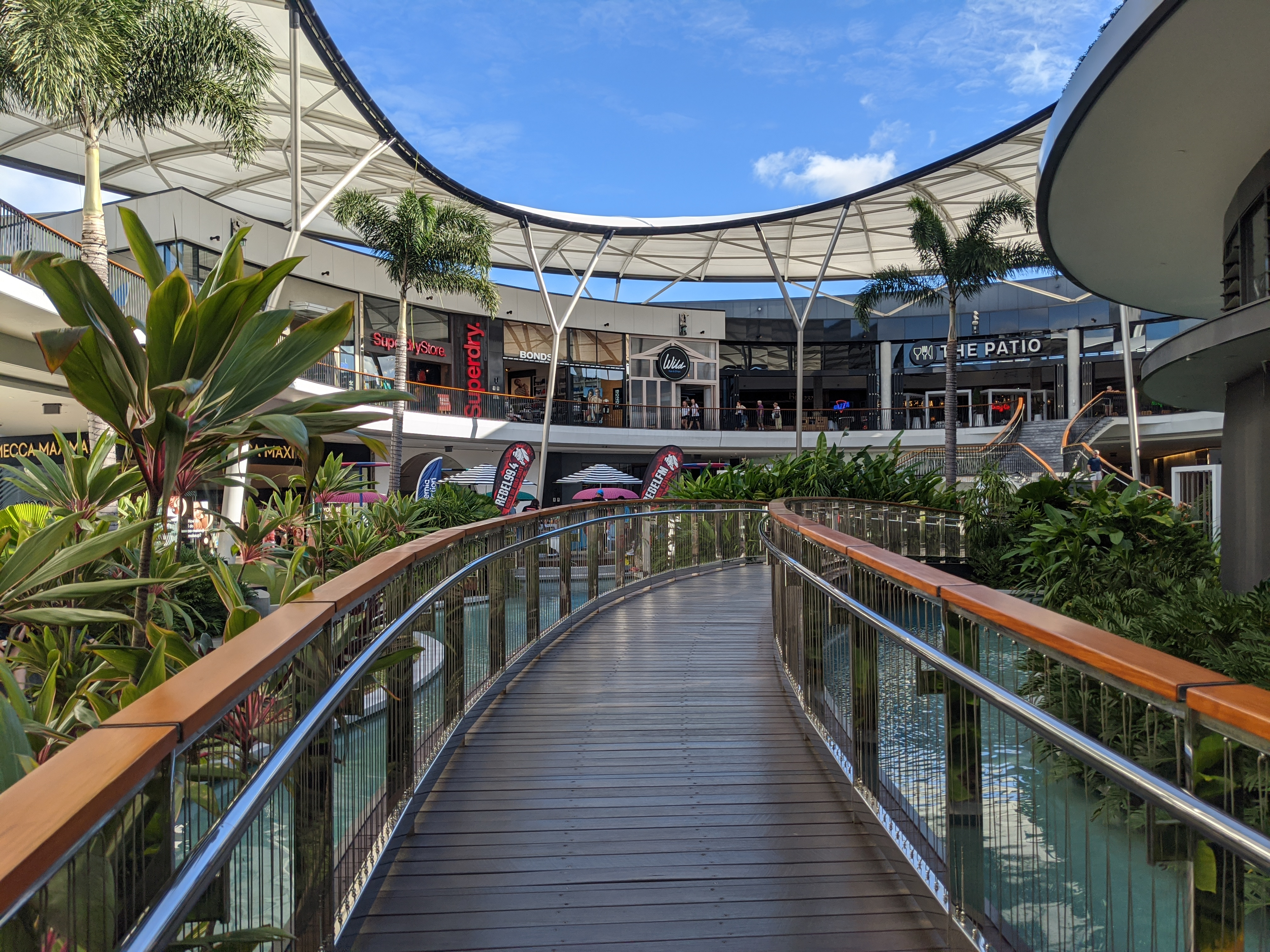

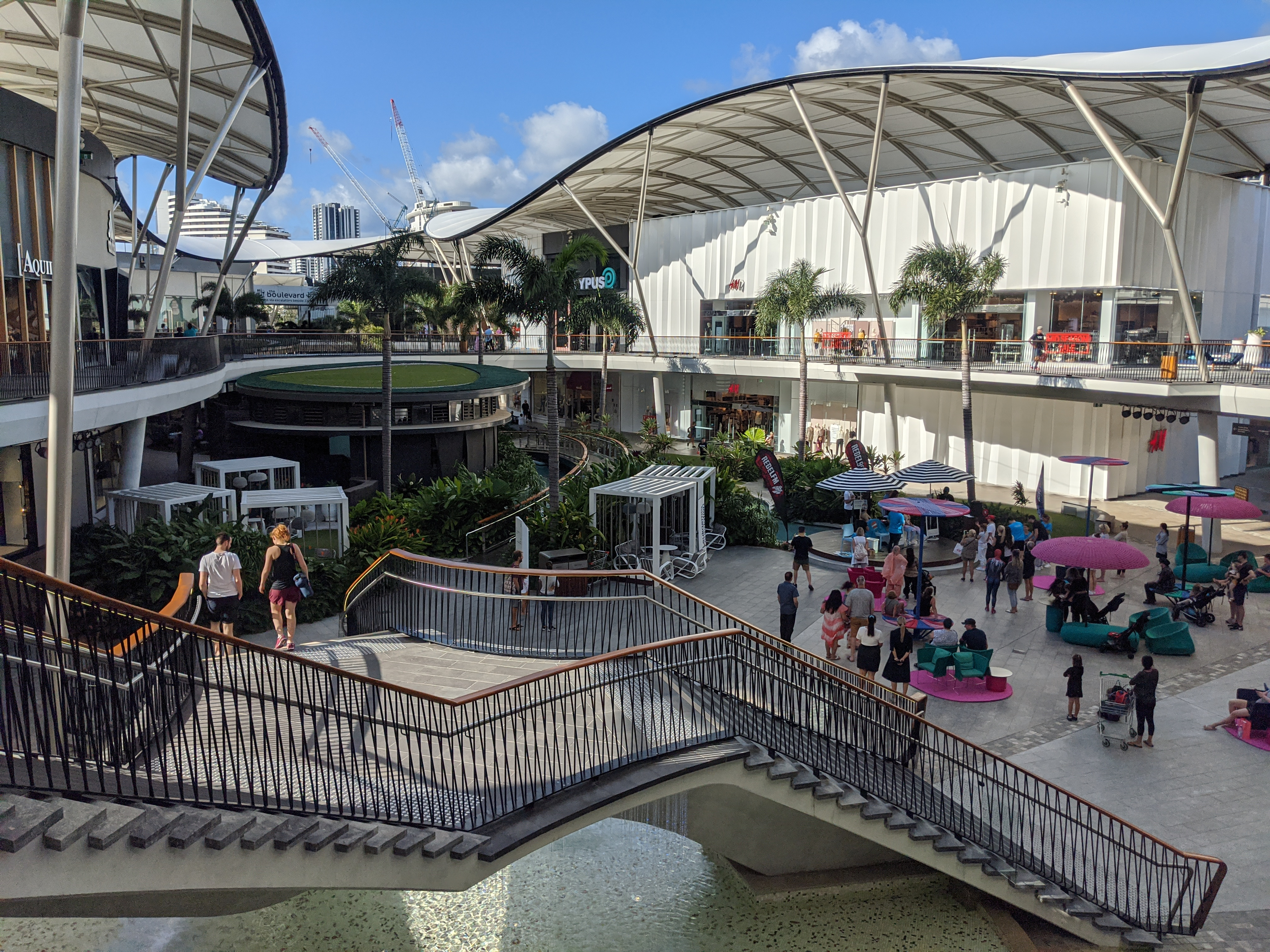

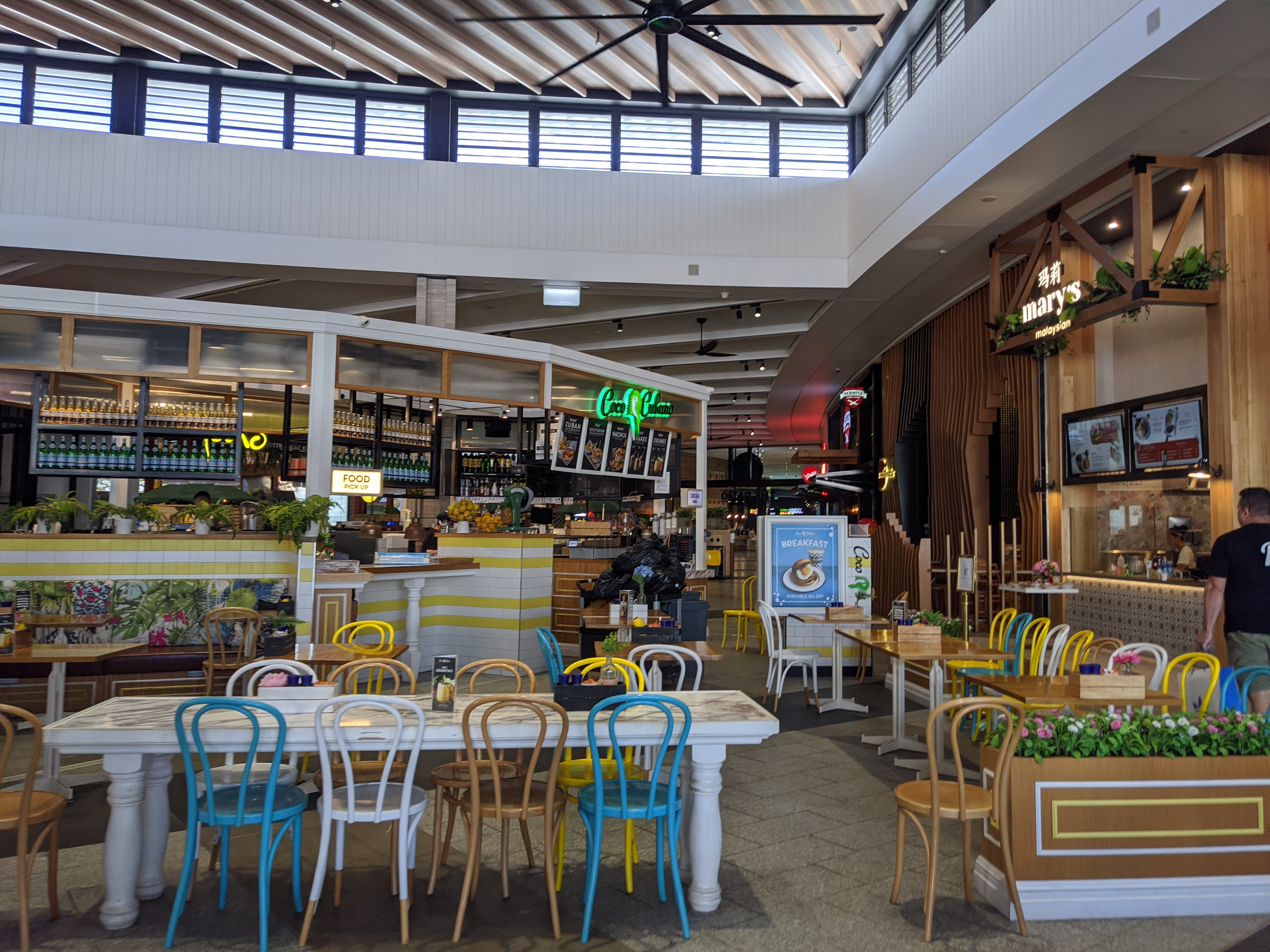

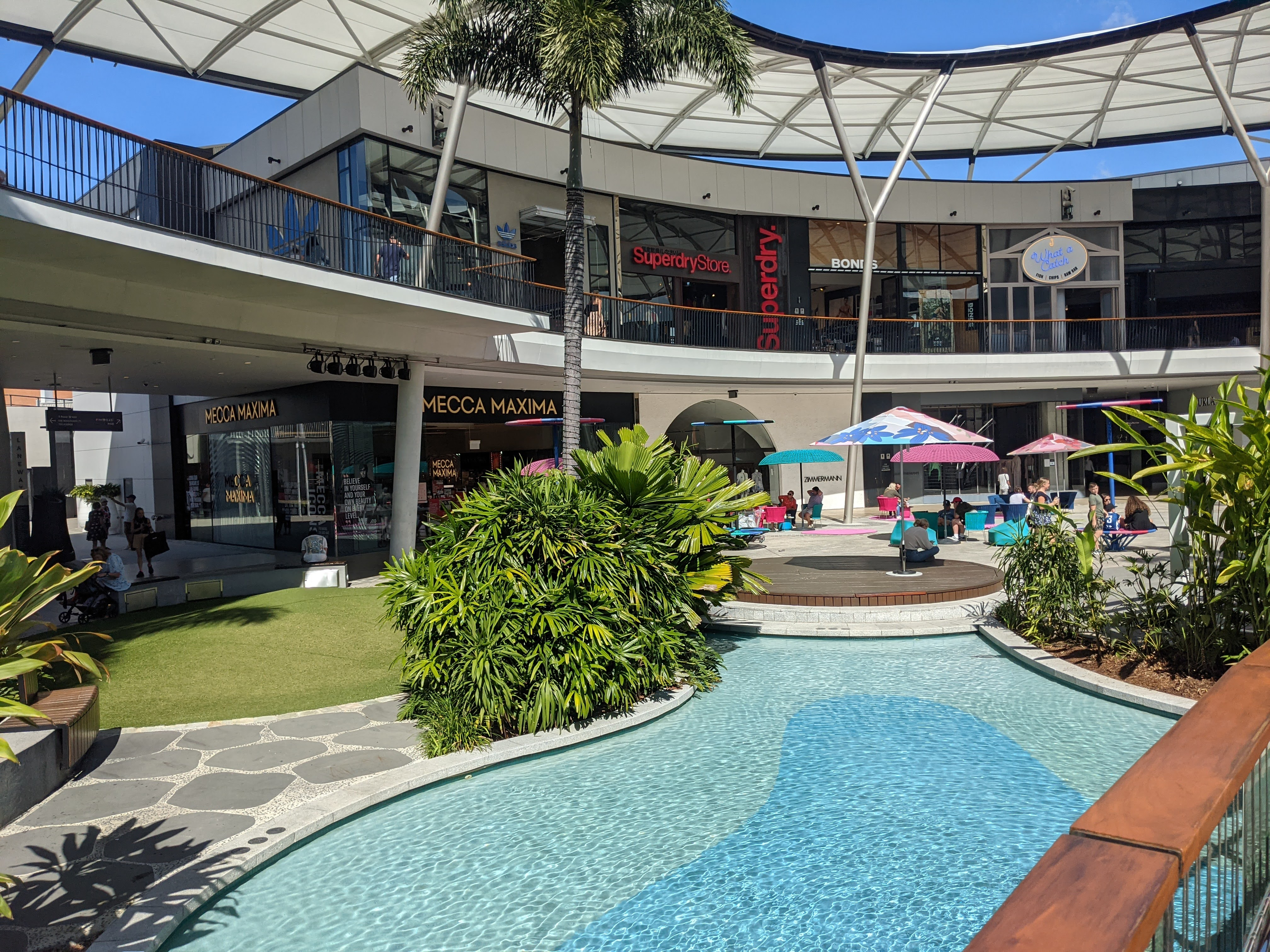

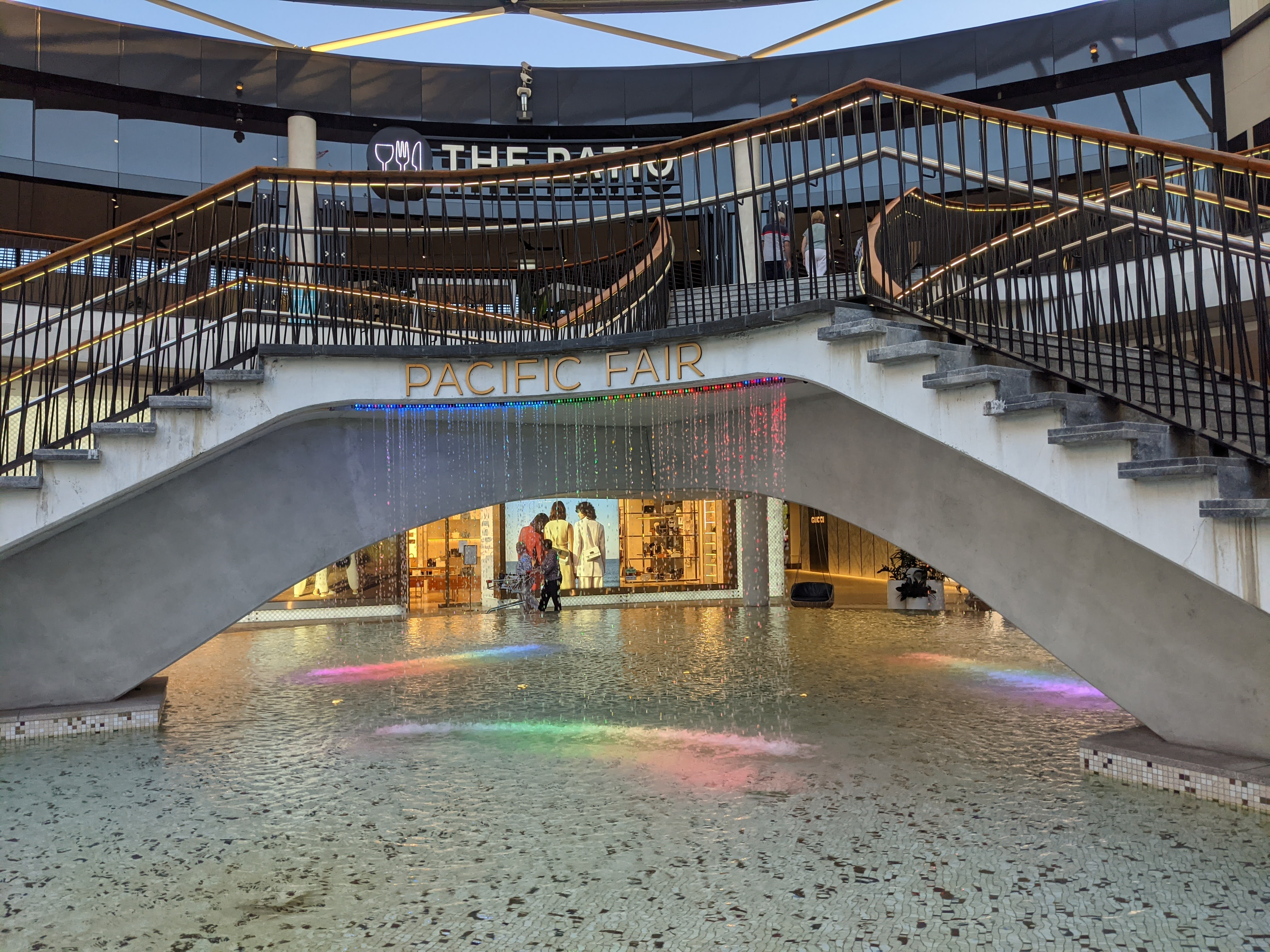

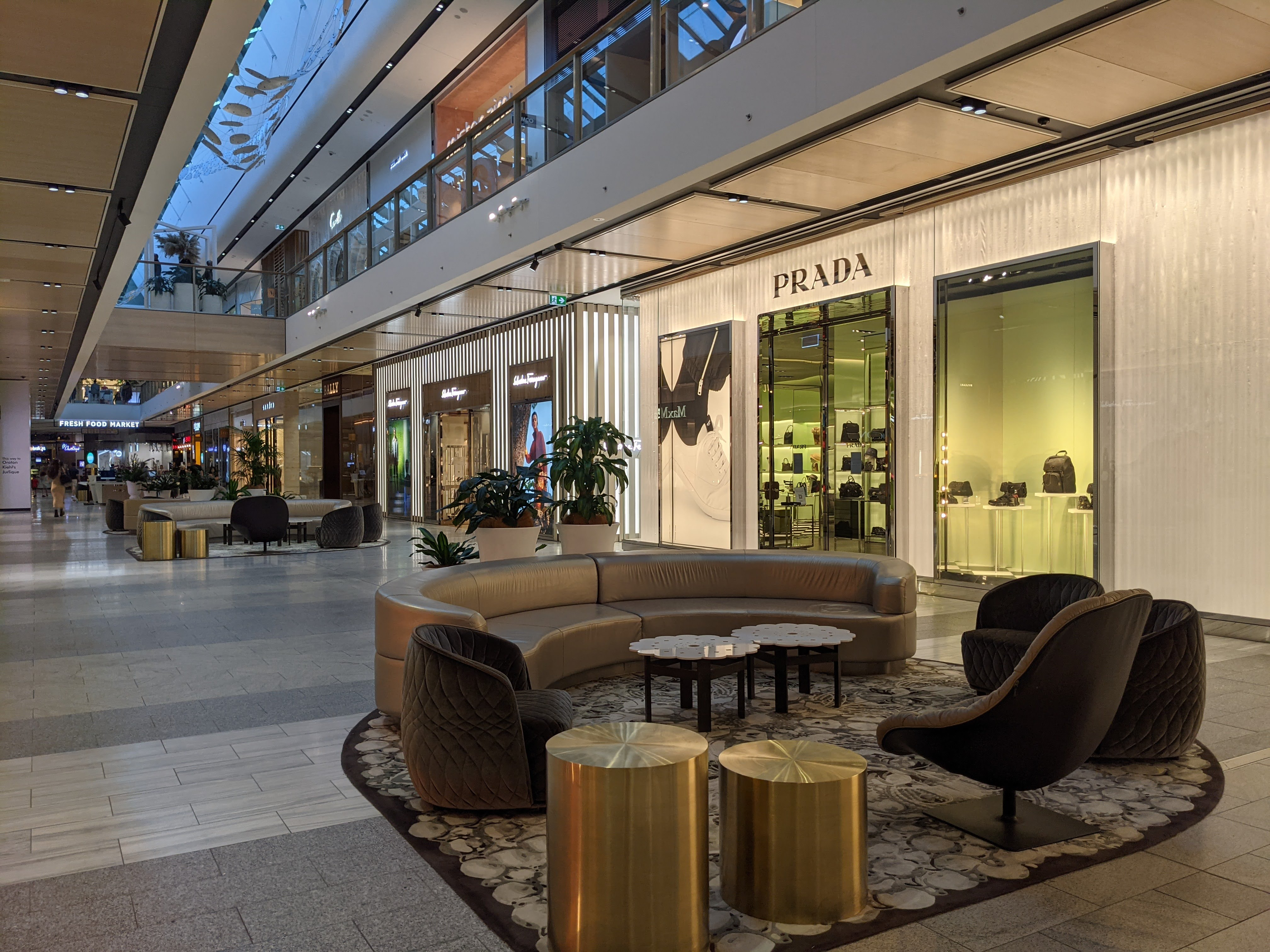

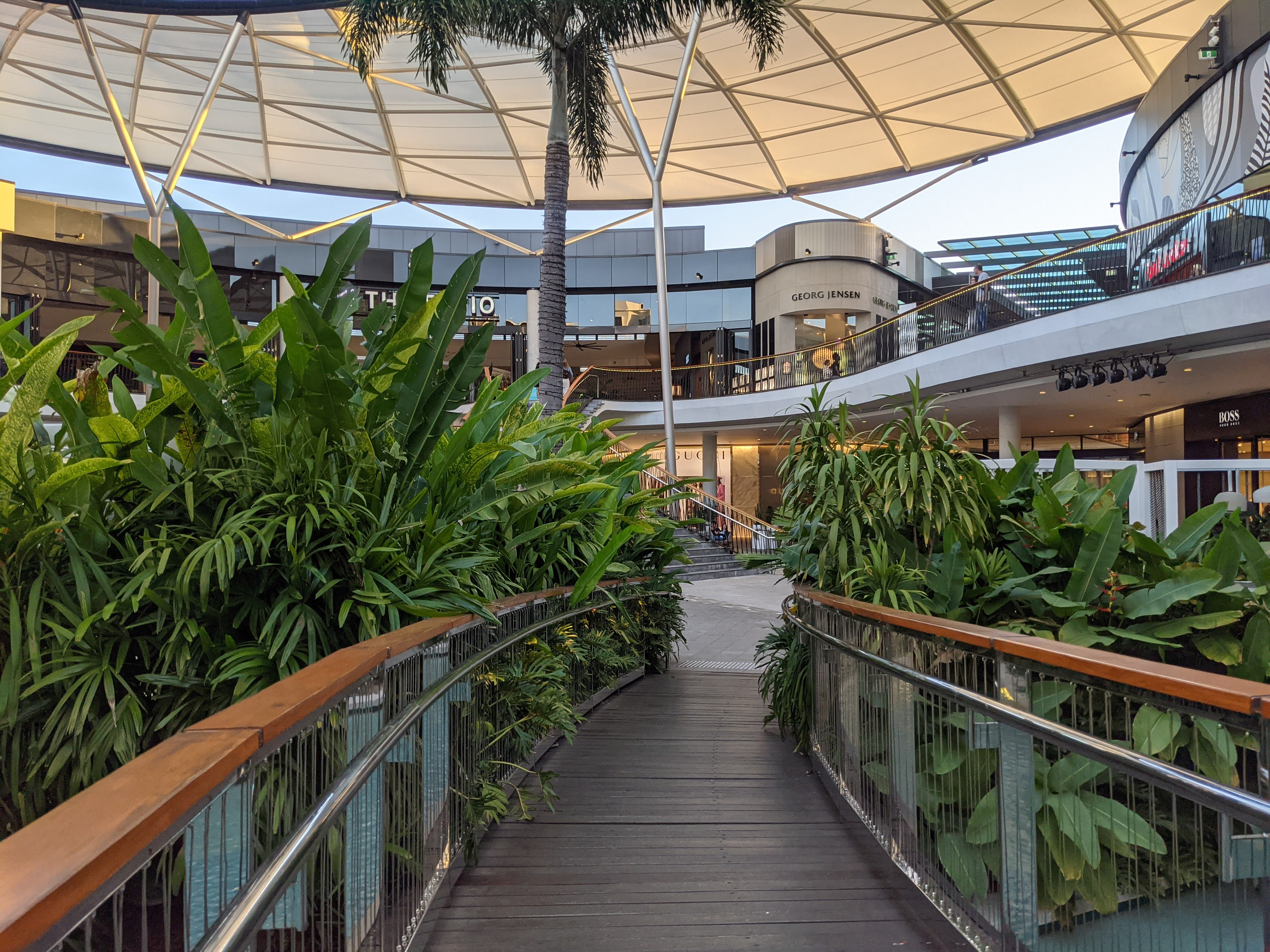

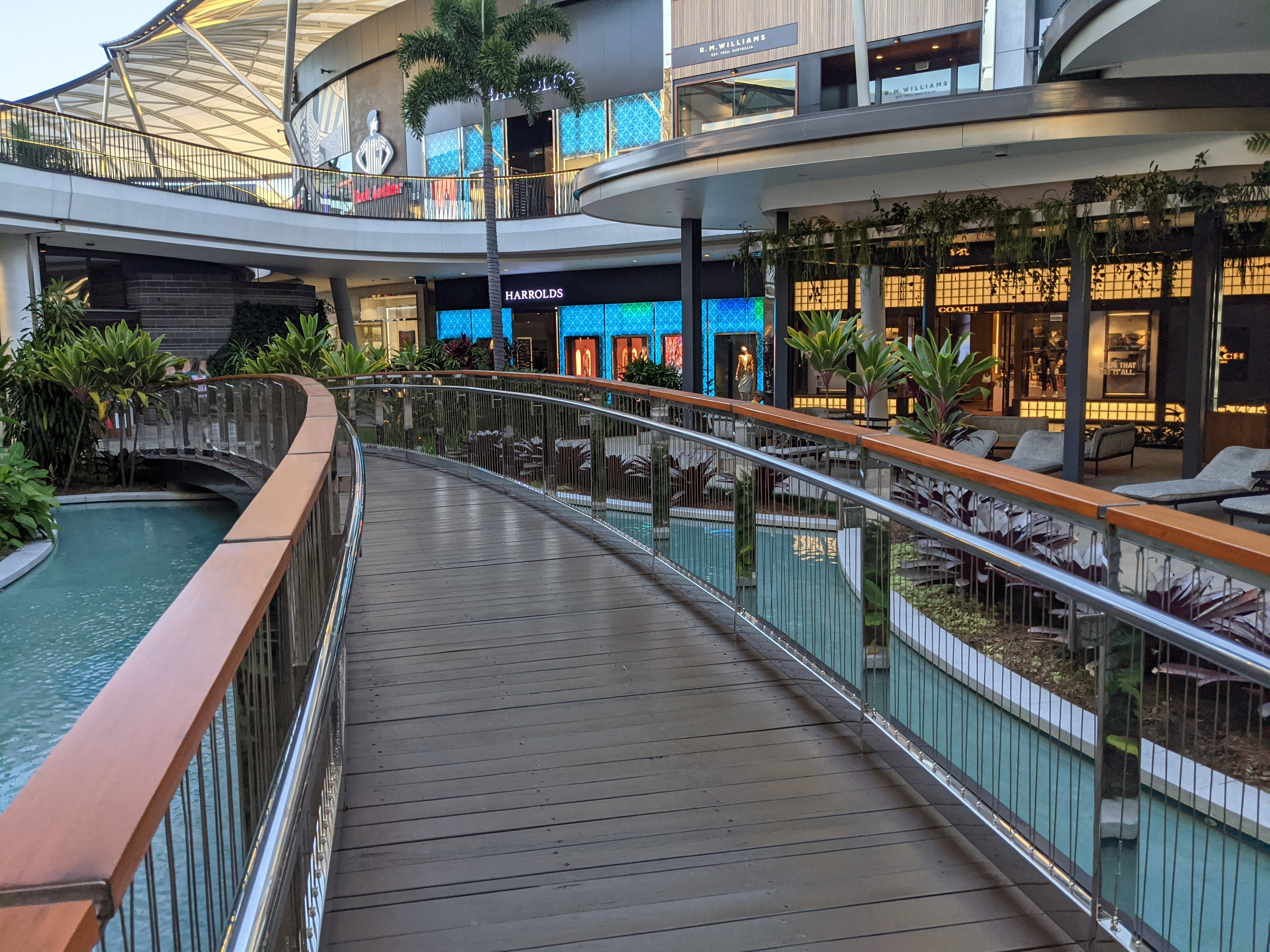

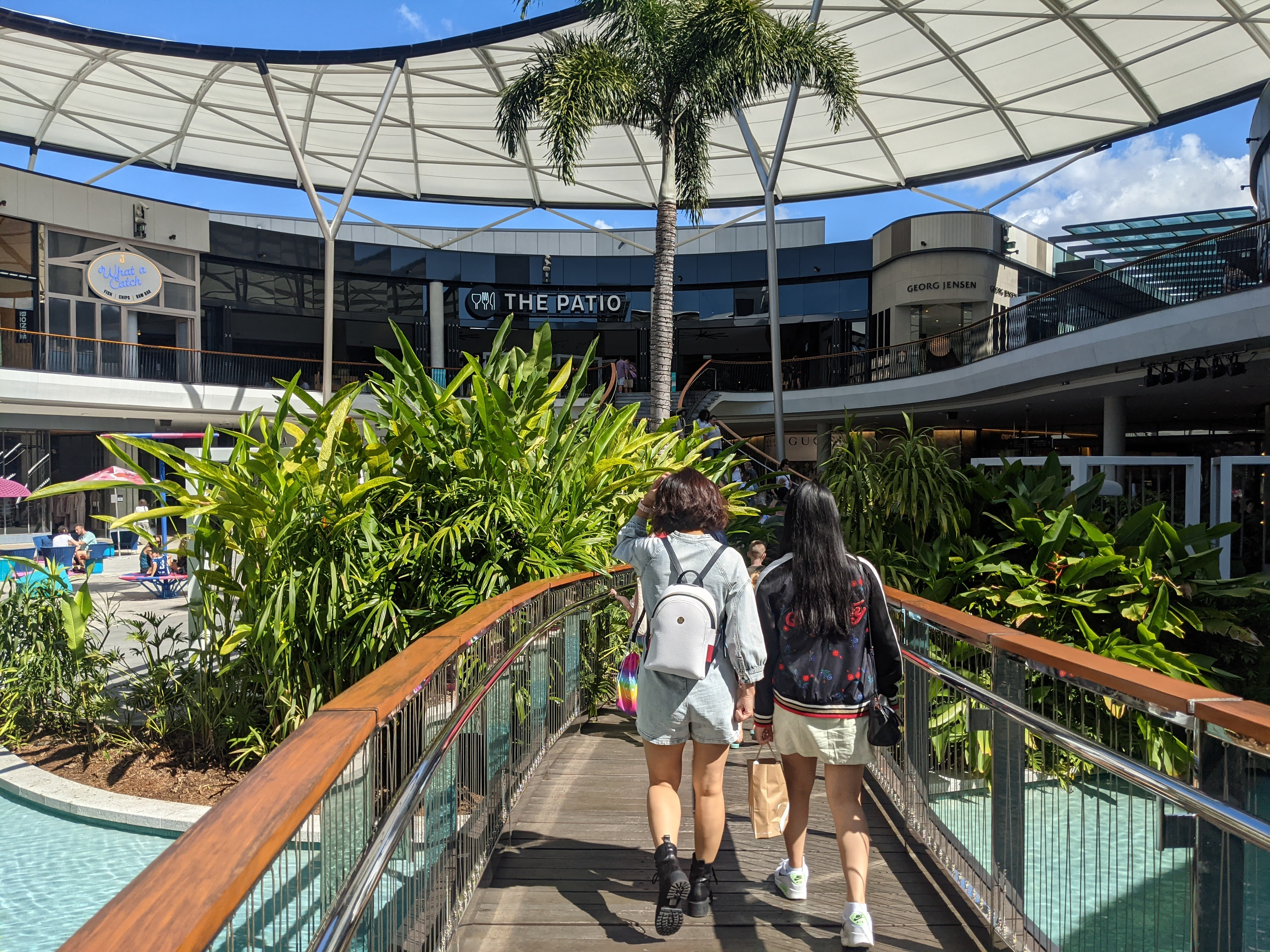

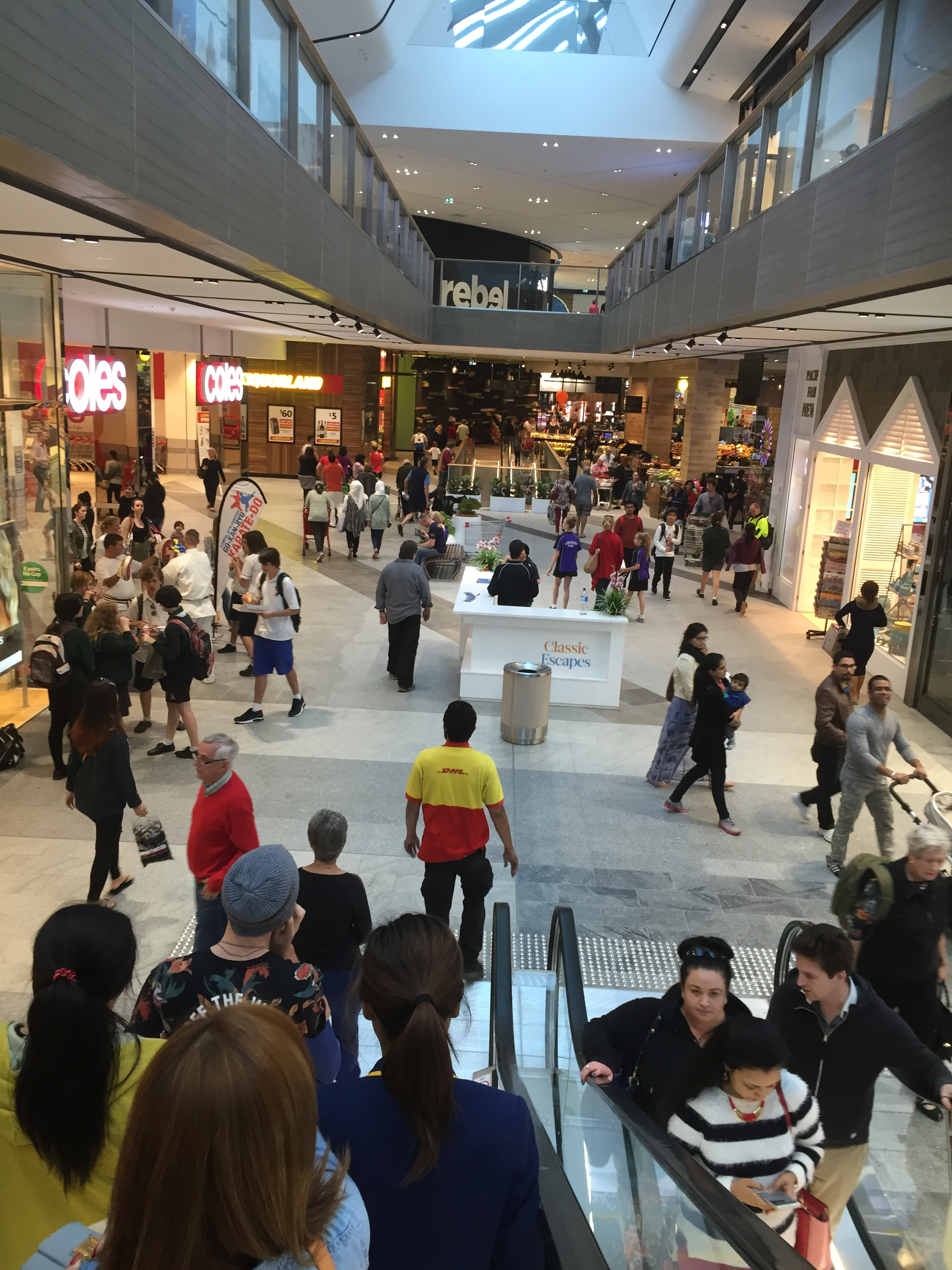
