= Merrimac State High School =

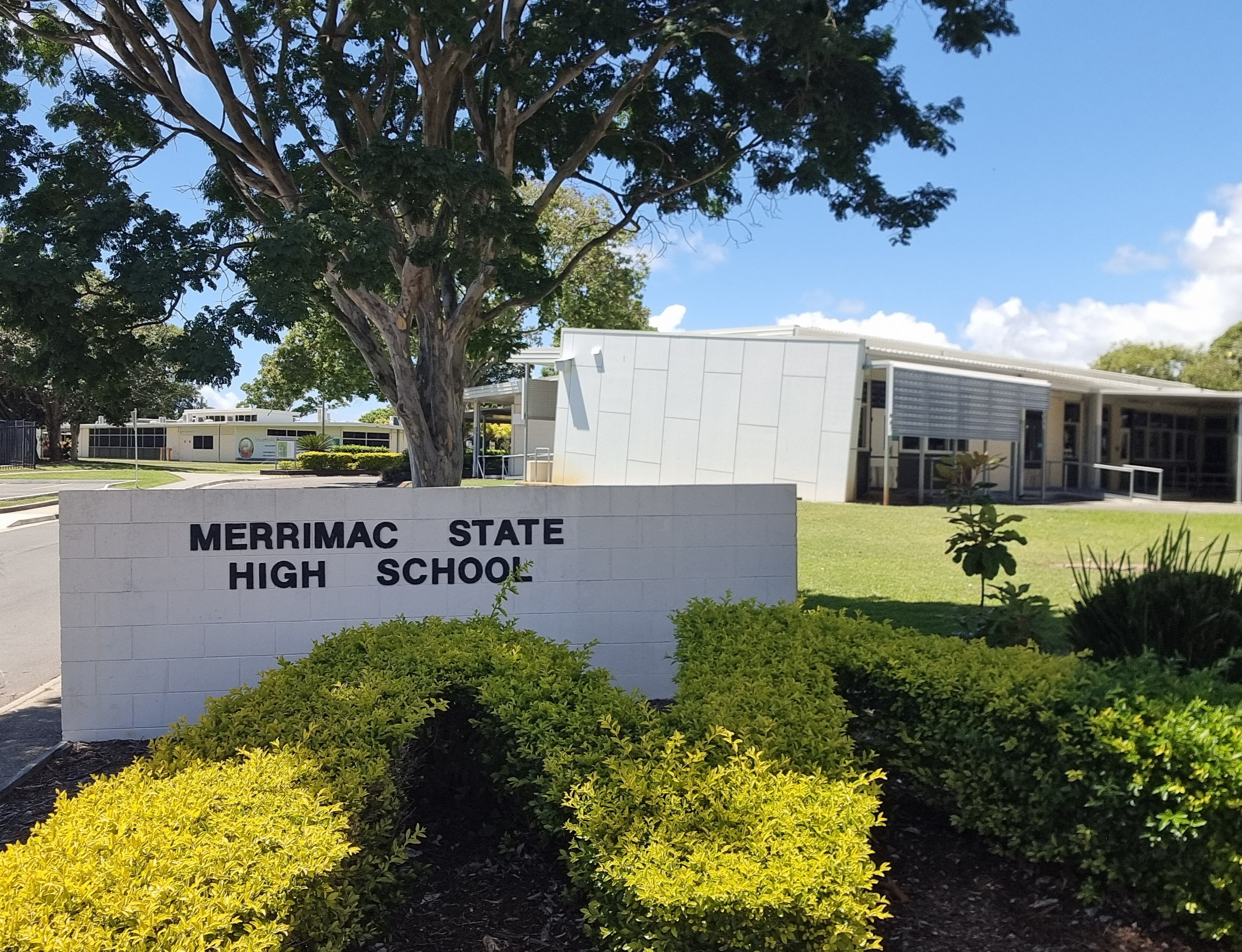
- Front entrance signage of Merrimac State High School, 2026

Location
- Dunlop Court; Mermaid Waters, Queensland, 4218; Australia; 28.0400°S 153.4177°E

Information
- Type: State secondary day school
- Motto: Pride in excellence
- Religious affiliation: Non-denominational
- Established: 1979
- Authority: Department of Education (Queensland)
- Principal: Rachel Cutajar
- Deputy Principals: Celia Norling; Jason Gibbs; Rachel Deere; Nyree Hawley
- Business Manager: Rachel Bullock
- Year levels: Year 7 – Year 12
- Gender: Coeducational
- Enrolment: 970 (August 2024)
- Average class size: 21 (Year 7 - 10); 18 (Year 11 - 11)
- Language: English
- Campus size: 10.4 acres (0.042 km^{2})
- Colours: Green; Black
- Website: merrimacshs.eq.edu.au

Merrimac State High School is a public high school in Mermaid Waters (Queensland, Australia). The school falls within Division 12 of Gold Coast council.

== Motto ==
The motto of the school is "Pride in Excellence", which is featured on the school's crest.

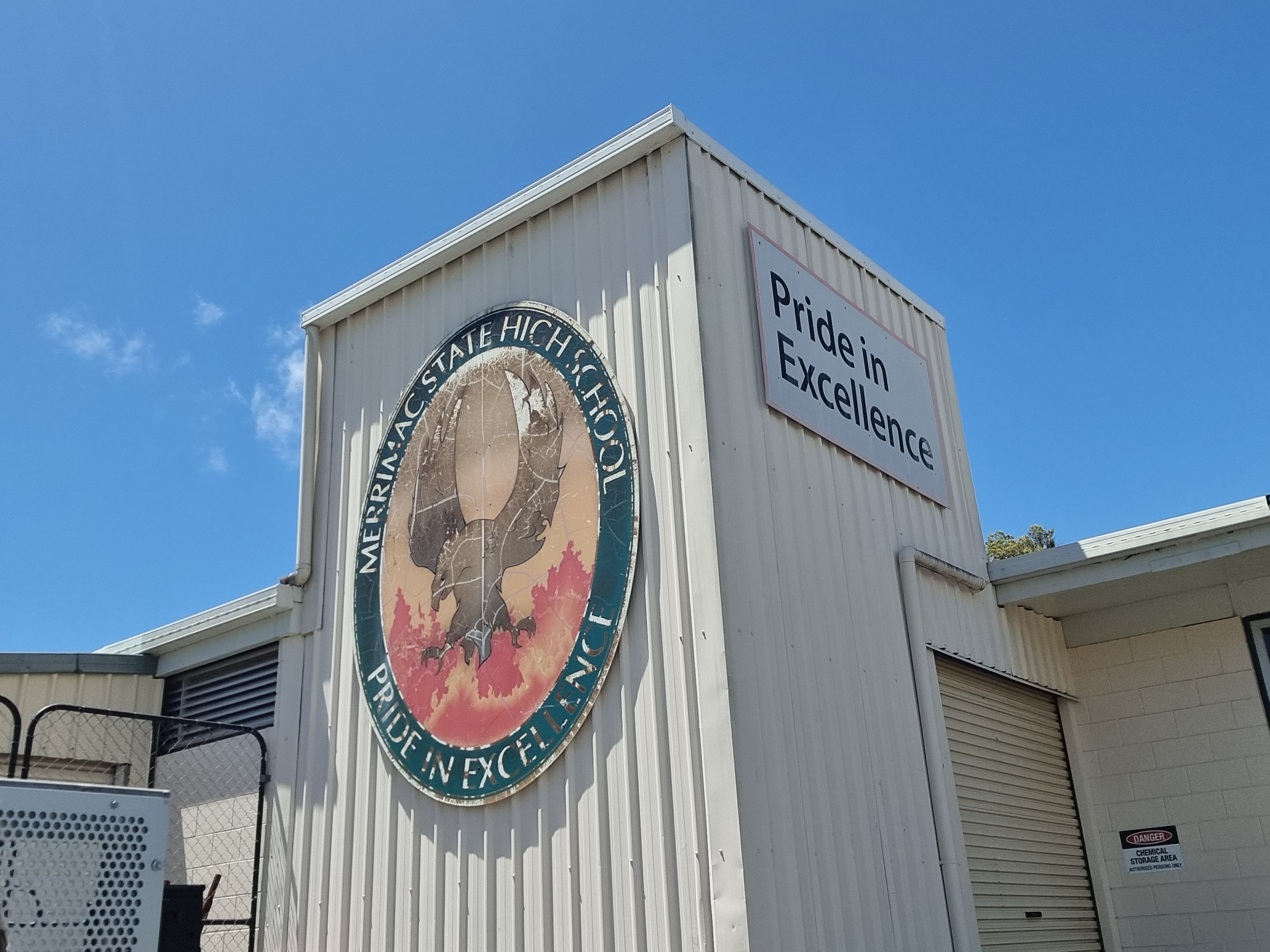
Merrimac State High School's motto on the signage of one of the school's buildings, 2026

== Administration ==
=== Staff ===
As of 2025, the school has a teaching staff of 84 (Full-time equivalent: 79.7) and a non-teaching staff of 51 (Full-time equivalent of 41.8).

=== Principals ===
In 1979, the first principal of the school was Brian Hallewell. As of 2026, the current principal is Rachel Cutajar. Recent principals have included:

Principals of the School
Principal	Tenure	
Principal	Initial Year	Final Year
Rachel Cutajar	2022	Current
Chris Tobin	-	2021

== Students ==
=== Years ===
In 2015, Anna Bligh's state-wide "Flying Start" program was officially implemented to align Queensland with the other states by transferring year 7 into the high school system, meaning that in 2015 Merrimac State High School started catering for years 7 – 12.

=== Student enrolments ===
In 2023, Merrimac State High School was reported to have a maximum student enrolment capacity of 1,492 students.

The trend in school enrolments (August figures) has been:-

Recent Student Enrolment Statistics
Year	Years						Gender		Total	Ref
Year	7	8	9	10	11	12	Boys	Girls	Total	Ref
2010	-	-	-	-	-	-	679	613	1,292	
2011	-	-	-	-	-	-	640	590	1,230	
2012	-	-	-	-	-	-	690	618	1,308	
2013	-	-	-	-	-	-	662	651	1,313	
2014	-	-	-	-	-	-	660	619	1,279	
Addition of year 7
2015	-	-	-	-	-	-	699	700	1,399	
2016	-	-	-	-	-	-	636	622	1,258	
2017	-	-	-	-	-	-	628	579	1,207	
2018	-	-	-	-	-	-	605	595	1,200	
2019	-	-	-	-	-	-	605	624	1,229	
2020	217	234	197	210	194	182	623	611	1,234	
2021	250	220	235	183	192	143	623	600	1,223	
2022	224	225	203	208	167	147	593	581	1,174	
2023	165	203	210	191	199	115	557	526	1,083	
2024	177	144	199	181	176	142	513	506	1,019	
2025	TBA	TBA	TBA	TBA	TBA	TBA	472	458	930	
2026	TBA	TBA	TBA	TBA	TBA	TBA	TBA	TBA	TBA	

== Sports ==
=== Houses ===
The school's four sports houses dervied the name from various Australian native animals and the translation of the names of those animals into the local indigenous language.

Sports Houses
House Name	Mascot	Colour	Surnames	Ref
Pigin Turtles	Turtle	Red	A - E	
Mibunn Eagles	Eagle	Yellow	F - L	
Bowai Sharks	Shark	Blue	M - Q	
Ngurun Dingoes	Dingo	White	R - Z	

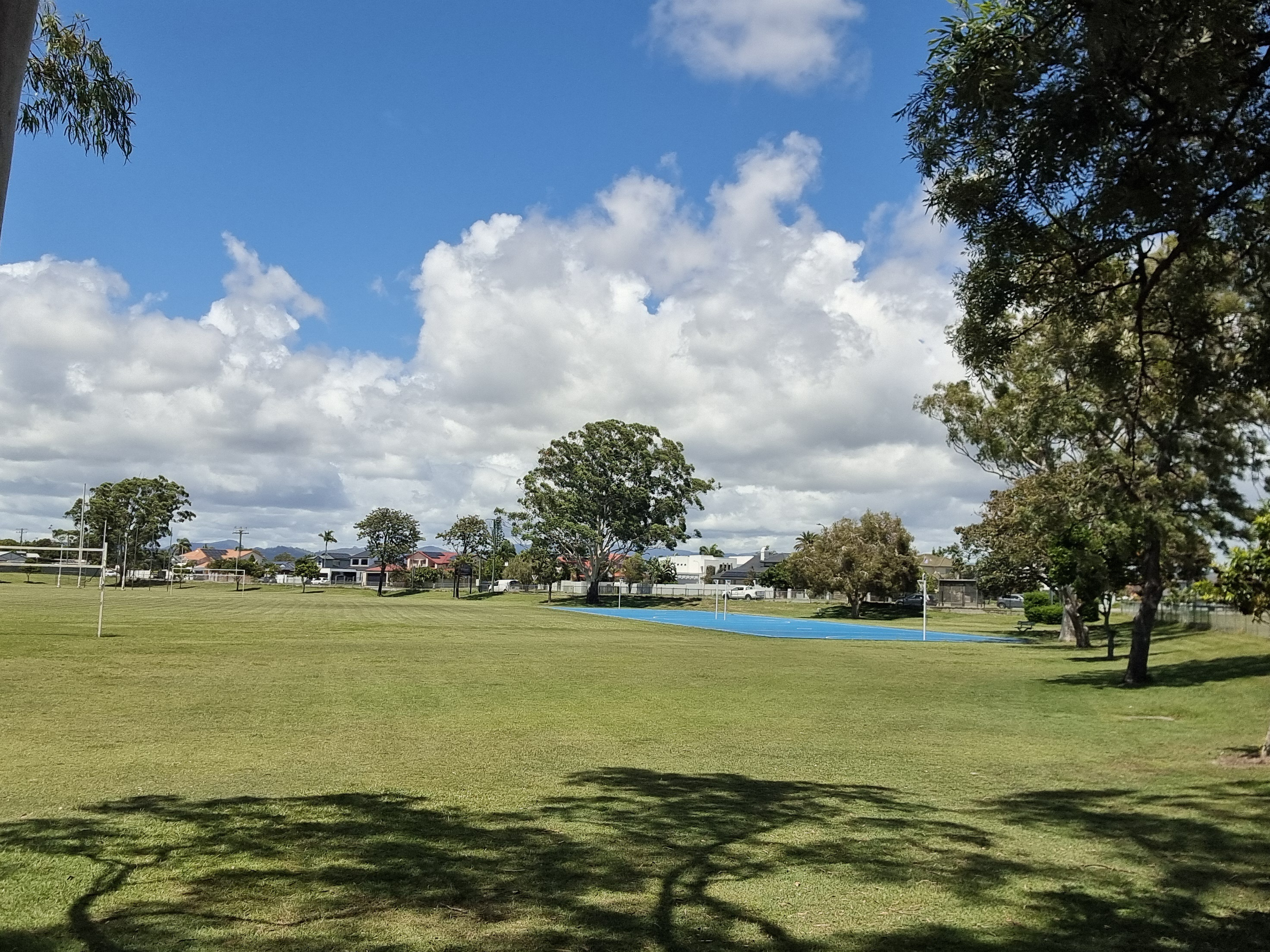
Merrimac State High School sport's oval, 2026, featuring the rugby field and basket ball courts.

== Notable alumni ==
=== Sports ===
Sports
Name	Graduation Date	Sport	Achievement	Ref
Marcus Ashcroft	1988	Australian rules football	Former professional Australian rules footballer for Brisbane Bears and Brisbane Lions, and Gold Coast football coaching panel member. The Marcus Ashcroft Medal is named after him.	
Caine Eckstein	2003	Surf lifesaving	Ironman champion	
Grant Hackett	1997	Swimming	Former professional Australian swimmer, gold medallist and world record holder, former "Regan Funds Management" Director, and current chief executive officer of "Generation Life".	
Trevor Hendy	1986	Surf lifesaving	Ironman Champion and professional kayaker	
Steven McLuckie	1990	Australian rules football	Former Australian rules footballer for Brisbane Bears, 1993 Queensland-Northern Territory State of Origin squad member, 2000 Joe Grant Medal winner, and Gold Coast school principal.	
Amber Pilley	2014	Australian rugby league footballer	Center for both the Brisbane Broncos Women's Team and Indigenous All Stars.	
Ricky Petterd	2005	Australian rules football	Former Australian rules football player Melbourne Football Club and Richmond Football Club.	

=== Entertainment ===
Entrainment
Name	Graduation date	Achievement	Ref
Pete Evans	1990	Chef, author, and My Kitchen Rules judge	

== See also ==
- Education in Queensland
- List of schools in Gold Coast, Queensland
