= List of road routes in Queensland =

Road routes in Queensland assist drivers navigating roads throughout the state, by identifying important through-routes. Queensland is in the process of converting to an alphanumeric route numbering system, with a letter denoting the importance and standard of the route. The previous shield-based system consisted of various route types – national highways, national routes, and state routes – with each type depicted by a different route marker design. Some routes have been converted to the alphanumeric system, while other routes are being maintained as shield-based routes – but with signs designed to be subsequently retrofitted with a replacement alphanumeric route. Tourist drives will continue to use a shield-based system.

Unless stated otherwise, all information in this article is derived from Google Maps.

== Alphanumeric routes ==
=== Brisbane routes ===
Route	Component roads and streets	From	Via	To	Length	Notes ↑ (Top)
M1	Pacific Motorway; Gateway Motorway	Tugun (NSW border)	Brisbane	Curra	287 km (178 mi)	Part of National Land Transport Network.
M1	Sir Leo Hielscher Bridges	Tugun (NSW border)	Brisbane	Curra	287 km (178 mi)	Tolled. Part of National Land Transport Network.
M1	Gateway Motorway; Bruce Highway	Tugun (NSW border)	Brisbane	Curra	287 km (178 mi)	Part of National Land Transport Network.
M2	Warrego Highway; Ipswich Motorway	Brassall	Carole Park and Drewvale	Eight Mile Plains	46 km (29 mi)	Part of National Land Transport Network.
M2	Logan Motorway	Brassall	Carole Park and Drewvale	Eight Mile Plains	46 km (29 mi)	Between Centenary Highway and Ipswich Motorway. Part of National Land Transport Network.
M2	Logan Motorway; Gateway Motorway	Brassall	Carole Park and Drewvale	Eight Mile Plains	46 km (29 mi)	Tolled. Part of National Land Transport Network.
M3 / A3	Pacific Motorway; Riverside Expressway; Boomerang Street; Hale Street; Inner City Bypass	Eight Mile Plains	Brisbane CBD	Bald Hills	38.3 km (23.8 mi)	
M3 / A3	Lutwyche Road; Gympie Road	Eight Mile Plains	Brisbane CBD	Bald Hills	38.3 km (23.8 mi)	
M3 / A3	Gympie Arterial Road	Eight Mile Plains	Brisbane CBD	Bald Hills	38.3 km (23.8 mi)	
M4	Port of Brisbane Motorway	Murarrie		Lytton	6.9 km (4.3 mi)	
A5/M5	Centenary Highway	Deebing Heights	Indooroopilly	Kelvin Grove	50.1 km (31.1 mi)	
A5/M5	Centenary Motorway; Western Freeway	Deebing Heights	Indooroopilly	Kelvin Grove	50.1 km (31.1 mi)	
A5/M5	Legacy Way (Tunnel)	Deebing Heights	Indooroopilly	Kelvin Grove	50.1 km (31.1 mi)	Toll
M6	Logan Motorway	Loganholme	Kingston	Drewvale	14.5 km (9 mi)	Tolled. Part of Logan Motorway, which has a total length of 30.3 km (19 mi)
M7 / A7	Ipswich Motorway	Gailes	Woolloongabba	Hendra	33.1 km (21 mi)	
M7 / A7	Ipswich Road	Gailes	Woolloongabba	Hendra	33.1 km (21 mi)	
M7 / A7	Clem Jones Tunnel; Airport Link (tunnel)	Gailes	Woolloongabba	Hendra	33.1 km (21 mi)	Tolled
M7 / A7	East West Arterial Road	Gailes	Woolloongabba	Hendra	33.1 km (21 mi)	
M9	Coomera Connector	Coomera		Helensvale	3.8 km (2.4 mi)	
M15	Cunningham Highway (Motorway grade section)	Riverview	Flinders View	Yamanto	11.2 km (7 mi)	New signs show, not. Not from Google Maps. Part of National Land Transport Network.

=== Regional routes ===
Route	Component roads and streets	From	Via	To	Length	Notes ↑ (Top)
A1	Bruce Highway	Kybong	Mackay	Cairns	1,526 km (948 mi)	Part of Bruce Highway, which has a total length of 1,679 km (1,043 mi).Part of National Land Transport Network.
A2	Warrego Highway	Brassall		Helidon Spa, Queensland		
A2	Warrego Highway (Toowoomba Bypass)	Helidon Spa, Queensland		Charlton, Toowoomba		Tolled
A2	Warrego Highway; Landsborough Highway; Barkly Highway	Charlton, Toowoomba	Charleville, Longreach, Cloncurry and Mount Isa	Northern Territory border	1,997 km (1,241 mi)	Continues into the Northern Territory as. Part of National Land Transport Network.
A3	New England Highway; D'Aguilar Highway; Burnett Highway	Glengallan	Toowoomba, Yarraman, Nanango, Goomeri and Biloela	Gracemere	752 km (467 mi)	Duplexed with through Goomeri. Duplexed with Dawson Highway through Biloela. Not related to in Brisbane
A4	Capricorn Highway	Rockhampton	Emerald	Barcaldine	575 km (357 mi)	Not related to in Brisbane
A5	Leichhardt Highway	Westwood	Miles	Goondiwindi	613 km (381 mi)	Not related to in Brisbane
A6	Flinders Highway	Townsville	Hughenden	Cloncurry	775 km (482 mi)	Part of National Land Transport Network. Not related to in Brisbane
A7	Carnarvon Highway; Dawson Highway; Gregory Highway	Roma	Rolleston, Springsure and Emerald	Black Jack (a suburb of Charters Towers)	874 km (543 mi)	Not related to in Brisbane
A15	Cunningham Highway; (non motorway grade): New England Highway	Yamanto	Warwick	Wallangarra	225 km (140 mi)	Part of National Land Transport Network. Old signs show (NH15). (A15) signs are only shown when signs are replaced.
A17	Brisbane Valley Highway; D'Aguilar Highway	Blacksoil	Esk	Yarraman	135 km (84 mi)	Duplexed with from Esk to Harlin
A21	Toowoomba Connection Road	Helidon Spa	Toowoomba	Charlton	27.3 km (17 mi)	
A39	Gore Highway; Leichhardt Highway; Newell Highway	Toowoomba	Milmerran	Goondiwindi (Qld / NSW border)	219.4 km (136 mi)	Area around Goondiwindi contains remnant (NH39) signage. Part of National Land Transport Network.
A55	Castlereagh Highway; Carnarvon Highway	Hebel (Qld / NSW border)	St George	Roma	355 km (221 mi)	
A71	Mitchell Highway	Augathella	Charleville and Cunnamulla	Barringun (Qld / NSW border)	397 km (247 mi)	The Queensland part of Mitchell Highway, which has a total length of 1,105 km (687 mi)
A139	Toowoomba Athol Road	Newtown		Athol	17.1 km (11 mi)	

== Active Metroads ==
Route	Component roads and streets	From	Via	To	Length	Notes ↑ (Top)
Metroad 2	Granard Road; Riawena Road; Kessels Road; Mt Gravatt–Capalaba Road	Rocklea	Macgregor	Mackenzie	11.4 km (7.1 mi)	
Metroad 5	Mount Coot–tha Road; Frederick Street; Rouen Road; Boundary Road; Macgregor Terrace; Jubilee Terrace; Elimatta Drive; Stewart Road; Wardell Street; South Pine Road; Stafford Road	Toowong	Everton Park	Kedron	13.3 km (8.3 mi)	

== National Highways and Routes ==
Route	Component roads and streets	From	Via	To	Length	Notes ↑ (Top)
National Route 1	Sheridan Street; Captain Cook Highway; Kennedy Highway; Gulf Developmental Road; Burke Developmental Road; Savannah Way; Wills Developmental Road; Doomadgee Road	Bruce Highway, Cairns	Smithfield, Kuranda, Mareeba, Atherton, Mount Garnet, Georgetown, Croydon, Normanton, Burketown and Doomadgee	Carpentaria Highway, Northern Territory border	1,153 km (716 mi)	Continues West as into the Northern Territory.
National Route 13	Beaudesert Road; Mount Lindesay Highway	Moorooka	Beaudesert	Summerland Way (Continues South as B91 south of the QLD/NSW border)	116 km (72 mi)	Part of National Land Transport Network from Drewvale to Beaudesert.
National Route 42	Cunningham Highway	Warwick		Goondiwindi	200 km (124 mi)	
National Route 46	Carnarvon Highway	St George	Thallon	Mungindi (Qld / NSW border)	111 km (69 mi)	The Queensland part of Carnarvon Highway, which has a total length of 698 km (434 mi)
National Route 83	Eyre Developmental Road; Diamantina Developmental Road; Barkly Highway; Burke Developmental Road	Birdsville	Boulia, Dajarra, Mount Isa and Cloncurry	Normanton	1,185 km (736 mi)	Duplexed with Barkly Highway from Mount Isa to Cloncurry

== State Routes ==
State Routes on the Gold Coast, Sunshine Coast and in regional Queensland are mostly numbered separately from those of Brisbane. This came into effect in the mid to late 1990s, and some remnants of the old system still remain. All routes east of the Pacific Motorway (then Pacific Highway) and north of the Nerang River changed numbering.

The changes made on the Gold Coast included:

- 87 changed to 2
- 86 changed to 10 (to Southport) and 3 (to Burleigh)
- 95 changed to 4
- 97 changed to 20
- 59 changed to 24

=== Routes 1 to 20 ===
Route	Component roads and streets	From	Via	To	Length	Notes ↑ (Top)
State Route 2 (Gold Coast)	Binstead Way; Gold Coast Highway, known in places (north to south) as: Brisbane Road; Marine Parade, Labrador; Frank Street; Marine Parade, Southport; Ferny Avenue; Remembrance Drive; Tweed Street, Burleigh Heads	Pacific Pines	Surfers Paradise	Tugun (NSW Border)	34.6 km (21.5 mi)	Continues into NSW as (NSW's only state route)
State Route 3 (Gold Coast)	Southport–Burleigh Road, known in places (north to south) as: High Street; Ferry Road; Bundall Road; Bermuda Street	Southport	Mermaid Waters	Burleigh Heads	17.9 km (11.1 mi)	
State Route 3 (Regional)	Isis Highway; Hinkler Avenue; Mount Perry Road; Bundaberg–Gin Gin Road; Gin Gin Road	Apple Tree Creek	Bundaberg	Gin Gin	93.6 km (58.2 mi)	
State Route 4 (Gold Coast)	Hope Island Road; Oxenford–Southport Road; Broadwater Avenue; Oxley Drive; Olsen Avenue; Currumburra Road; Ross Street; Birmingham Road	Oxenford	Runaway Bay	Carrara	23.9 km (14.9 mi)	
State Route 4 (Regional) Tourist Drive 10	Bridge Street; Lakes Creek Road; Emu Park Road; Hill Street; Pattison Street; Scenic Highway; Yeppoon Road; Yaamba Road (Bruce Highway); Musgrave Street; Queen Elizabeth Drive	Berserker	Emu Park and Yeppoon	Berserker	103 km (64.0 mi)	This is a circular route from and to the northern end of the Fitzroy Bridge in Rockhampton. It is also signed as.
State Route 5 (Regional)	Sarina–Homebush Road; Eton–Homebush Road; Peak Downs Highway; Marian–Eton Road; Mackay–Eungella Road; Marian–Hampden Road	Sarina	Eton and Marian	Hampden (a locality 27 km (17 mi) north of Mackay, on the Bruce Highway)	62.7 km (39.0 mi)	
State Route 6 (Regional)	Cooroy Connection Road; Myall Street; Elm Street; Diamond Street; Tewantin Road; Cooroy–Noosa Road; Beckmans Road; Eumundi–Noosa Road; Eenie Creek Road; Heathland Drive; David Low Way; Bradman Avenue (Maroochydore); Duporth Avenue; Beach Road; Horton Parade; Aerodrome Road; Alexandra Parade (Alexandra Headland); Mooloolaba Esplanade (Mooloolaba); Venning Street; Walan Street; Brisbane Road; Nicklin Way; Caloundra Road; Steve Irwin Way (see note); Peachester Road; Kilcoy–Beerwah Road	Cooroy	Sunshine Coast	Woodford	134 km (83.3 mi)	The section of Steve Irwin Way from Caloundra Road to Beerwah is also signed as.
State Route 7 (Gold Coast)	Robina Parkway	Clear Island Waters		Robina	6.7 km (4.2 mi)	
State Route 7 (Regional)	Taroom–Bauhinia Downs Road; Fitzroy Developmental Road	Taroom	Bauhinia	Duaringa	237 km (147.3 mi)	Duplexed with Dawson Highway from Rhydding to Bauhinia
State Route 8 (Sunshine Coast)	Maroochydore Road	Forest Glen	Kunda Park	Maroochydore	9.9 km (6.2 mi)	
State Route 9 (Regional)	Sturt Street; Ingham Road	Townsville	Garbutt	Cosgrove (a suburb 13 km (8 mi) west of Townsville City on the Bruce Highway)	11.9 km (7.4 mi)	
State Route 10 (Brisbane)	Montpelier Road; Campbell Street; Hamilton Place; Brookes Street; Gregory Terrace; College Road; Countess Street (southbound only); Saul Street (southbound only); Petrie Terrace (northbound only); Upper Roma Street (northbound only); Skew Street (northbound only); Grey Street; Peel Street; Merivale Street (southbound only); Cordelia Street (northbound only); Vulture Street; Stanley Street, Brisbane; Annerley Road; Ipswich Road; Waterton Street; Ekibin Road East; Sexton Street; Esher Street; Birdwood Road; Marshall Road; Holland Road; Boundary Road; Wiles Street; Ferguson Road; Oateson Skyline Drive; Kensington Avenue; Agnew Street; Bennetts Road; Wynnum Road; Riding Road	Bowen Hills	Tarragindi	Bulimba	24.2 km (15.0 mi)	
State Route 10 (Gold Coast)	Smith Street Motorway; Smith Street; North Street	Gaven	Parkwood	Southport	7.1 km (4.4 mi)	Smith Street Motorway starts at Pacific Pines with no route number. It becomes (Gold Coast) after it crosses the Pacific Motorway.
State Route 10 (Sunshine Coast)	Nambour–Bli Bli Road	Nambour		Bli Bli	6.9 km (4.3 mi)	
State Route 11 (Brisbane)	Marshall Road; Toohey Road; Orange Grove Road; Boundary Road; Halt Street; Lensworth Street; Beenleigh Road; Bradman Street	Tarragindi	Salisbury	Acacia Ridge	9.9 km (6.2 mi)	
State Route 11 (Regional)	Suttor Developmental Road	Nebo	Elphinstone	Mount Coolon	167 km (104 mi)	
State Route 11 (Sunshine Coast)	Yandina–Coolum Road; Beach Road	Yandina		Coolum	16.9 km (10.5 mi)	
State Route 12 (Regional)	Gin Gin–Mount Perry Road; Heusman Street; Annie Street; Monto–Mount Perry Road	Gin Gin	Mount Perry	Langley (a locality 34 km (21 mi) south of Monto, on the Burnett Highway)	109 km (67.7 mi)	
State Route 12 (Sunshine Coast)	Memorial Drive; Eumundi–Noosa Road	Eumundi	Doonan	Noosaville	14.9 km (9.3 mi)	
State Route 14 (Regional)	Diamantina Developmental Road; Quilpie–Windorah Road; Birdsville Developmental Road	Charleville	Windorah	Birdsville	831 km (516.4 mi)	
State Route 15 (Brisbane)	Bowen Bridge Road; Brunswick Street, Brisbane; Barry Parade; Gipps Street; Bradfield Highway; Main Street; Ipswich Road	Windsor	Kangaroo Point	Woolloongabba	6.2 km (3.9 mi)	
State Route 15 (Regional)	Brisbane Road; Crescent Road; Cootharaba Road; Tin Can Bay Road	Monkland	Gympie	Canina (a locality 8 km (5 mi) north-east of Gympie, on Tin Can Bay Road.	11.6 km (7.2 mi)	Tin Can Bay Road continues east without a route number, leading to Tin Can Bay, with a side road leading to Rainbow Beach.
State Route 16 (Regional)	Abbott Street; Railway Avenue; Saunders Street; Dean Street; Denham Street; Eyre Street; Warburton Street; Bundock Street; Percy Street; Hugh Street; Gulliver Street	Cluden	Townsville	Mundingburra	16.5 km (10.3 mi)	
State Route 18 (Regional)	Aramac–Torrens Creek Road	Aramac		Torrens Creek	247 km (153.5 mi)	
State Route 19 (Regional)	Hughenden–Muttaburra Road; Muttaburra–Aramac Road; Barcaldine–Aramac Road	Hughenden	Muttaburra and Aramac	Barcaldine	359 km (223.1 mi)	
State Route 20 (Brisbane)	Sandgate Road; Junction Road; Rose Street; Park Road; Kedron Park Road	Toombul		Lutwyche	2.8 km (1.7 mi)	Northern section. Most direct route to south-western section is via to Milton, and then (Milton Road) to Toowong.
State Route 20 (Brisbane)	Sylvan Road; Jephson Street; Moggill Road; Coonan Street; Wharf Street (northbound only); Bridge Street; Wharf Street; Oxley Road; Sherwood Road; Muriel Avenue; Evans Road	Toowong	Sherwood	Salisbury	13.4 km (8.3 mi)	South-western section. Most direct route to south-eastern section is via and (Toohey Road and Marshall Road) to Holland Park, and then (Logan Road) to Mount Gravatt. Duplexed with between Toowong and Indooroopilly.
State Route 20 (Brisbane)	Creek Road	Mount Gravatt	Carindale	Murarrie	10.3 km (6.4 mi)	South-eastern section. To complete the loop of Brisbane back to the northern section the most direct route is via (Lytton Road), (Gateway Motorway), Southern Cross Way, and Airport Drive / Airport Link.
State Route 20 (Gold Coast)	Southport–Nerang Road; Nerang Street; Queen Street	Nerang	Ashmore	Southport	9.3 km (5.8 mi)	

=== Routes 21 to 40 ===
Route	Component roads and streets	From	Via	To	Length	Notes ↑ (Top)
State Route 21 (Brisbane)	Mount Gravatt–Capalaba Road; Mount Cotton Road; Broadwater Road; Mount Cotton Road; Duncan Road; Boundary Road; Cleveland–Redland Bay Road; Colburn Avenue	Mackenzie	Thornlands	Victoria Point	21.7 km (13.5 mi)	
State Route 22 (Brisbane)	Williams Street; Bradley Street; Mount Samson Road; Main Street; Samford Road	Dayboro	Samford Village	Alderley	38.7 km (24.0 mi)	Northern section. Most direct route to southern section is via Enoggera Road, Kelvin Grove Road, (Countess Street and Saul Street), North Quay,, (Vulture Street), (Main Street and Ipswich Road), and Okeefe Street.
State Route 22 (Brisbane)	Old Cleveland Road; Moreton Bay Road; Finucane Road; Shore Street West; North Street; Shore Street North	Greenslopes	Capalaba	Cleveland	27.7 km (17.2 mi)	Southern section
State Route 23 (Brisbane)	Shafston Avenue; Lytton Road; Wynnum Road; Balmoral Street (eastbound only); Wynnum Road (westbound only); Wynnum Road; Glenora Street	Kangaroo Point	Morningside	Wynnum	16.2 km (10.1 mi)	
State Route 24 (Brisbane)	Junction Road; Lytton Road; Pritchard Street; Port Drive	Morningside	Murarrie	Port of Brisbane	13.2 km (8.2 mi)	Port Drive continues with no route number to the working area of the Port of Brisbane on Fisherman Island.
State Route 24 (Gold Coast)	Ashmore Road; Salerno Street; Via Roma	Ashmore	Bundall	Surfers Paradise	8 km (5.0 mi)	Ashmore Road starts in Molendinar with no route number, and becomes after it crosses (Southport Nerang Road)
State Route 24 (Regional)	East Evelyn Road	Millaa Millaa		Evelyn	10.6 km (6.6 mi)	
State Route 25 (Brisbane)	Wickham Street (eastbound only); Ann Street (westbound only); Breakfast Creek Road; Kingsford Smith Drive; Eagle Farm Road; Main Myrtletown Road; Priors Road; Bancroft Road; Brownlee Street; Main Beach Road	Fortitude Valley	Hamilton	Pinkenba	16.3 km (10.1 mi)	
State Route 25 (Regional)	Palmerston Highway; Millaa Millaa–Malanda Road; Malanda–Atherton Road	Belvedere (a locality 5 km (3 mi) north of Innisfail, on the Bruce Highway)	Millaa Millaa and Malanda	Atherton	93.6 km (58.2 mi)	
State Route 26 (Brisbane)	Deception Bay Road; Anzac Avenue; Elizabeth Avenue; Snook Street; Elizabeth Avenue; Houghton Highway; Deagon Deviation; Braun Street; Sandgate Road; Frodsham Street (southbound only); Abbotsford Road; Markwell Street; St Pauls Terrace	Burpengary	Kippa-Ring	Fortitude Valley	40.9 km (25.4 mi)	
State Route 27 (Brisbane)	Fifth Avenue; Landsborough Avenue; Oxley Avenue; Hornibrook Esplanade; Houghton Highway; Hornibrook Highway; Beaconsfield Terrace; Brighton Terrace; Deagon Street; Southerden Street; Board Street; Depot Road; Lemke Road; Handford Road; Murphy Road; Ellison Road; Webster Road	Scarborough	Sandgate	Stafford	30.5 km (19.0 mi)	
State Route 27 (Regional)	Mareeba–Dimbulah Road; Burke Developmental Road	Mareeba	Dimbulah and Chillagoe	Normanton	698 km (433.7 mi)	
State Route 28 (Brisbane)	South Pine Road; Albany Creek Road; Robinson Road West; Railway Parade; Newman Road; Robinson Road East	Strathpine	Albany Creek	Virginia	17.2 km (10.7 mi)	
State Route 29 (Brisbane)	South Pine Road	Everton Hills		Everton Park	1.6 km (1.0 mi)	South Pine Road has no route number from Arana Hills to Everton Hills, where it becomes part of before becoming. From the Everton Park end of South Pine Road continues with no route number to Alderley.
State Route 30 (Brisbane)	Lindum Road; Kanawah Road; Crawford Road; School Road; New Lindum Road; Wynnum Road; Preston Road; Manly Road; Green Camp Road; New Cleveland Road; Old Cleveland Road; Tilley Road; Mount Gravatt–Capalaba Road; Grieve Road; Rochedale Road; Logan Road; Compton Road; Beaudesert Road; Learoyd Road; King Avenue; Inala Avenue; Poinsettia Street; Progress Road	Lytton	Springwood	Wacol	52.5 km (32.6 mi)	
State Route 31 (Brisbane)	Northbrook Parkway; Mount Glorious Road; Mount Nebo Road; Waterworks Road; Musgrave Road	Dundas	Mount Nebo	Brisbane	64.1 km (39.8 mi)	
State Route 32 (Brisbane)	Mount Coot–tha Road; Milton Road	Toowong	Milton	Brisbane	3.1 km (1.9 mi)	
State Route 33 (Brisbane)	Coronation Drive; Benson Street; High Street; Moggill Road; Moggill Ferry; Moggill Ferry Road; Endeavour Road; McEwan Road	Brisbane	Indooroopilly	Riverview	27.5 km (17.1 mi)	Duplexed with between Toowong and Indooroopilly
State Route 34 (Brisbane)	Benson Street; Brisbane Street; Gailey Road; Sir Fred Schonell Drive	Toowong		Saint Lucia	2.5 km (1.6 mi)	
State Route 35 (Brisbane)	Oxley Road; Blunder Road; Wadeville Street; Stapylton Road	Sherwood	Inala	Heathwood	12.4 km (7.7 mi)	
State Route 36 (Brisbane)	Mains Road; Pinelands Road; Calam Road	Nathan	Sunnybank	Calamvale	6.9 km (4.3 mi)	
State Route 37 (Brisbane)	Mount Crosby Road; Tantivy Road; Delacy Street	Pinjarra Hills	Mount Crosby	North Ipswich	19.5 km (12.1 mi)	
State Route 38 (Brisbane)	Ipswich – Warrego Highway Connection (Fernvale Road); Pine Mountain Road; Downs Street; The Terrace; Pine Street; East Street	Brassal	North Ipswich	Ipswich	7.6 km (4.7 mi)	
State Route 39 (Brisbane)	South Station Road; Robertson Road; Chermside Road; Salisbury Road	Booval	Silkstone	Ipswich	4.4 km (2.7 mi)	
State Route 40 (Brisbane)	Telegraph Road (Bracken Ridge); Lacey Road; Linkfield Road; Carseldine Road; Roghan Road; Bridgeman Road; Beckett Road; Queens Road (Everton Park); South Pine Road; Pimelea Street; Dawson Parade; Samford Road; Settlement Road	Deagon	Bridgeman Downs	The Gap	20.8 km (12.9 mi)	
State Route 40 (Regional)	Mulligan Highway	Lakeland		Cooktown	78.5 km (48.8 mi)	Part of Mulligan Highway, which has a total length of 266 km (165.3 mi)

=== Routes 41 to 60 ===
Route	Component roads and streets	From	Via	To	Length	Notes ↑ (Top)
State Route 41 (Brisbane)	Vulture Street (eastbound only); Caswell Street (eastbound only); Stanley Street (westbound only); Stanley Street East (westbound only); Stanley Street East; Cavendish Road; Newnham Road	South Brisbane	Coorparoo	Upper Mount Gravatt	13.8 km (8.6 mi)	
State Route 41 (Regional)	Clermont–Alpha Road	Clermont		Alpha	178 km (110.6 mi)	
State Route 42 (Gold Coast)	Mudgeeraba Road; Worongary Road; Gilston Road; Hinde Road; Latimers Crossing Road	Mudgeeraba	Gilston	Advancetown	12 km (7.5 mi)	
State Route 43 (Brisbane)	Manly Road; Green Camp Road; Rickertt Road; Quarry Road; Birkdale Road	Tingalpa	Manly West	Wellington Point	12.1 km (7.5 mi)	
State Route 44 (Brisbane)	Redland Bay Road	Capalaba		Thornlands	7.1 km (4.4 mi)	
State Route 44 (Regional)	Captain Cook Highway; Mossman–Mount Molloy Road	Smithfield	Port Douglas	Mount Molloy	86.4 km (53.7 mi)	
State Route 45 (Brisbane)	Mount Cotton Road	Capalaba	Mount Cotton	Cornubia	20.1 km (12.5 mi)	
State Route 46 (Brisbane)	Main Road (Wellington Point); Old Cleveland Road East; Sturgeon Street; Northern Arterial Road; Wellington Street (Thornlands); Panorama Drive	Wellington Point	Ormiston	Thornlands	11 km (6.8 mi)	
State Route 47 (Brisbane)	Waterloo Street; Russell Street (Cleveland); Bloomfield Street; Cleveland–Redland Bay Road; Serpentine Creek Road; Beenleigh–Redland Bay Road	Cleveland	Redland Bay	Loganholme	31.6 km (19.6 mi)	
State Route 48 (Regional)	Toowoomba–Karara Road; William Street; Cambooya Connection Road	Karara	Leyburn	Cambooya	74.2 km (46.1 mi)	Terminates at New England Highway, 5.2 km east of Cambooya village
State Route 49 (Regional)	Wide Bay Highway; Burnett Highway; Bunya Highway; Warrego Highway; Moonie Highway; Carnarvon Highway; Balonne Highway	Bells Bridge (a locality 12 km (7 mi) north of Gympie, on the Bruce Highway)	Kingaroy, Dalby, and St George	Cunnamulla	826 km (513.3 mi)	Duplexed with Burnett Highway through Goomeri. Duplexed with Warrego Highway through Dalby. Duplexed with Carnarvon Highway through St George.
State Route 50 (Gold Coast)	Mudgeeraba Road; Gooding Drive	Mudgeeraba		Carrara	5.2 km (3.2 mi)	
State Route 51 (Regional)	Mary Valley Road; Kenilworth–Brooloo Road	Gympie	Kandanga	Kenilworth	51.6 km (32.1 mi)	
State Route 52 (Wide Bay–Burnett)	Isis Highway	Childers	Biggenden	Ban Ban Springs	83.5 km (51.9 mi)	Part of Isis Highway, which has a total length of 135 km (83.9 mi)
State Route 52 (Far North Queensland)	Gillies Highway; Louise Street; Kennedy Highway; Atherton–Herberton Road; Longlands Gap–Herberton Road	Gordonvale	Yungaburra, Atherton and Herberton	Evelyn	87.8 km (54.6 mi)	Duplexed with Kennedy Highway through Atherton
State Route 54 (Brisbane)	Mount Gravatt–Capalaba Road; Old Cleveland Road; Birkdale Road	Chandler	Capalaba	Birkdale	7.8 km (4.8 mi)	
State Route 55 (Brisbane)	Old Cleveland Road; Old Cleveland Road East	Birkdale		Wellington Point	2.7 km (1.7 mi)	
State Route 56 (Brisbane)	Boundary Road; McCullough Street; Padstow Road; Miles Platting Road	Archerfield	Eight Mile Plains	Rochedale	10.1 km (6.3 mi)	
State Route 57 (Brisbane)	Beenleigh Road	Sunnybank	Kuraby	Underwood	8.0 km (5.0 mi)	
State Route 57 (Regional)	Gympie Road (Tinana); Ferry Street; Walker Street; John Street; Saltwater Creek Road; Maryborough–Hervey Bay Road; Boat Harbour Drive	Tinana	Maryborough	Urangan	44.8 km (27.8 mi)	
State Route 58 (Brisbane)	Mount Mee Road (Brisbane–Woodford Road); Hay Road; Dayboro Road; Gympie Road; Strathpine Road	D'Aguilar	Dayboro	Bald Hills	60.8 km (37.8 mi)	
State Route 58 (Regional)	Gladstone–Benaraby Road; Philip Street; Glenlyon Road / Glenlyon Street; Hanson Road; Gladstone–Mount Larcom Road	Benaraby	Gladstone	Mount Larcom	52.4 km (32.6 mi)	
State Route 59 (Brisbane)	Chambers Flat Road	North Maclean	Chambers Flat	Marsden	16.4 km (10.2 mi)	
State Route 59 (Regional)	Proserpine–Shute Harbour Road	Hamilton Plains	Airlie Beach	Shute Harbour	34.3 km (21.3 mi)	Hamilton Plains is a locality immediately north of Proserpine on the Bruce Highway. The route follows Waterson Way to bypass the Airlie Beach CBD (Main Street)
State Route 60 (Brisbane)	Uhlmann Road; Morayfield Road; Beerburrum Road	Burpengary	Caboolture	Beerburrum	23 km (14.3 mi)	
State Route 60 (Regional)	Dawson Road; Dawson Highway; Burnett Highway; Dawson Highway; Leichhardt Highway; Dawson Highway	Gladstone	Biloela	Rolleston	335 km (208.2 mi)	Duplexed with Burnett Highway through Biloela. Duplexed with Leichhardt Highway through Banana.

=== Routes 61 to 80 ===
Route	Component roads and streets	From	Via	To	Length	Notes ↑ (Top)
State Route 61 (Regional)	Blackstone Road; Thomas Street; Mary Street; Redbank Plains Road; Queen Street	Silkstone	Redbank Plains	Goodna	14.5 km (9.0 mi)	Western terminus is the intersection of Blackstone Road and South Station Road, Silkstone. Eastern terminus is a roundabout where Queen Street (Goodna) intersects with Smiths Road, Mill Street, and Church Street.
State Route 62 (Regional)	Kennedy Developmental Road; Winton Road	Minnamoolka	Hughenden and Winton	Boulia	936 km (581.6 mi)	
State Route 63 (Regional)	Gregory Developmental Road	Charters Towers	Greenvale	Conjuboy (a locality 73 km (45 mi) north of Greenvale, on the Kennedy Developmental Road)	259 km (160.9 mi)	Part of Gregory Developmental Road / Gregory Highway, which has a total length of 930 km (577.9 mi)
State Route 64 (Brisbane)	Park Ridge Road	Park Ridge		Logan Reserve	5.9 km (3.7 mi)	
State Route 64 (Regional)	Mackay–Eungella Road	Alexandra	Marian and Mirani	Eungella	69.7 km (43.3 mi)	
State Route 67 (Regional)	Fitzroy Developmental Road; Dingo–Mount Flora Road	Dingo	Middlemount	Strathfield (a locality 29 km (18 mi) south of Nebo, on the Peak Downs Highway)	235 km (146.0 mi)	
State Route 68 (Regional)	Oakey–Pittsworth Road; Aubigny Road; Campbell Street; Bridge Street; Davidson Street; Blake Road; Oakey–Cooyar Road; Pechey–Maclagan Road	Oakey	Balgowan	Wutul (a locality 41 km (25 mi) north of Crows Nest, on the New England Highway)	58.8 km (36.5 mi)	
State Route 69 (Regional)	Gladstone–Monto Road; Lister Street	Calliope	Many Peaks	Monto	132 km (82.0 mi)	
State Route 70 (Regional)	Peak Downs Highway	Mackay	Nebo	Clermont	283 km (175.8 mi)	Duplexed with Gregory Highway for 14.1 km north of Clermont
State Route 70 (Sunshine Coast)	Sunshine Motorway; Emu Mountain Road; Walter Hay Drive	Sippy Downs	Mountain Creek	Noosaville	45.3 km (28.1 mi)	Has motorway significance on Sunshine Motorway
State Route 71 (Brisbane)	Anzac Avenue	Petrie	Kallangur	Redcliffe	17.8 km (11.1 mi)	Duplexed with between Rothwell and Kippa Ring
State Route 72 (Regional)	Ross River Road; Hervey Range Road	Hermit Park	Thuringowa Central	Basalt	133 km (82.6 mi)	
State Route 73 (Regional)	Eidsvold–Theodore Road	Eidsvold	Cracow	Theodore	144 km (89.5 mi)	
State Route 74 (Regional)		Condamine	Meandarra	Bungunya	180 km (111.8 mi)	Route starts 3 km south of Condamine on the Leichhardt Highway and ends 20 km west of Toobeah on the Barwon Highway
State Route 75 (Regional)	Mundubbera–Durong Road	Mundubbera		Durong	105 km (65.2 mi)	
State Route 76 (Regional)	Gregory Downs–Camooweal Road	Gregory		Camooweal	219 km (136.1 mi)	
State Route 77 (Regional)	Peter Delemothe Road; Bowen Developmental Road	Bowen	Collinsville	Belyando Crossing – Gregory Highway	259 km (161 mi)	
State Route 80 (Gold Coast)	Burleigh Connection Road; West Burleigh Road	Reedy Creek		Burleigh Heads	5.3 km (3 mi)	
State Route 80 (Regional)	Eastern Drive; Railway Street; Western Drive; Gatton–Helidon Road; Gatton–Clifton Road	Gatton	West Haldon	Clifton	63.3 km (39 mi)	

=== Routes 81 to 99 ===
Route	Component roads and streets	From	Via	To	Length	Notes ↑ (Top)
State Route 81 (Regional)	Mulligan Highway; Peninsula Developmental Road; Central Avenue	Mareeba	Mount Molloy, Lakeland, Laura and Coen	Weipa	758 km (471 mi)	
State Route 82 (Regional)	Chinchilla–Wondai Road; Wondai Road; Jandowae Connection Road; Dalby–Jandowae Road; Warrego Highway; Dalby–Cecil Plains Road; Toowoomba–Cecil Plains Road; Pampas–Horrane Road; Gore Highway; Millmerran–Inglewood Road	Tingoora	Dalby	Inglewood	323 km (201 mi)	Duplexed with Warrego Highway through Dalby. Triplexed with Gore Highway and between Pampas and Millmerran.
State Route 84 (Regional)	Julia Creek–Kynuna Road; Wills Developmental Road	Kynuna	Julia Creek, Four Ways and Gregory	Burketown	591 km (367 mi)	
State Route 85 (Regional)	Goodwin Drive; Benabrow Avenue; Bribie Island Road; Bruce Highway Service Road, (Caboolture); D'Aguilar Highway; Brisbane Valley Highway; Esk–Hampton Road; New England Highway; Ruthven Street; Chalk Drive; Hume Street; Toowoomba Connection Road; Toowoomba Athol Road; Gore Highway; Leichhardt Highway; Barwon Highway	Bellara, Bribie Island	Kilcoy, Esk, and Hampton	Nindigully	582 km (362 mi)	Duplexed with New England Highway between Hampton and Toowoomba. Duplexed with Toowoomba Connection Road and Toowoomba-Athol Road through Toowoomba. Duplexed with Gore Highway between Athol and Goondiwindi North. Duplexed with Leichhardt Highway between Goondiwindi North and Goondiwindi. Duplexed with between Pampas and Millmerran.
State Route 86 (Regional)	Alice Street; Maryborough–Biggenden Road	Maryborough	Brooweena	Biggenden	83.4 km (52 mi)	
State Route 87 (Regional)		Kumbarilla	Meandarra	Surat	188 km (117 mi)	Route starts 48 km west of Dalby on the Moonie Highway
State Route 88 (Regional)	Camp Cable Road	Jimboomba		Yarrabilba	7.3 km (5 mi)	
State Route 89 (Regional)	Connor Street; Texas Road; Stanthorpe–Texas Road; Mingoola Road; Flemming Street; High Street; Greenup Street; Inglewood–Texas Road; Princess Street	Stanthorpe	Texas	Inglewood	153 km (95 mi)	
Alternate State Route 89 (Regional)	Stanthorpe–Inglewood Road; Cunningham Highway	Pikedale (a locality 35 km (22 mi) west of Stanthorpe, on State Route 89)	Oman Ama (a locality 20 km (12 mi) east of Inglewood, on the Cunningham Highway)	Inglewood	73.9 km (46 mi)	Duplexed with Cunningham Highway between Oman Ama and Inglewood
State Route 90 (Gold Coast)	Boonah–Fassifern Road; Coronation Drive; Ipswich–Boonah Road; Beaudesert–Boonah Road; Bromelton Street; Mount Lindesay Highway; William Street; Albert Street; Beaudesert–Nerang Road; Beaudesert–Beenleigh Road; Mundoolun Connection Road; Christie Street; Pine Street; Mount Nathan Road; Price Street; Ferry Street; Nerang Connection Road; Nerang–Broadbeach Road; Gooding Drive; Hooker Boulevard	Fassifern	Beaudesert	Broadbeach	121 km (75 mi)	This route traverses three segments of Beaudesert Nerang Road, with other named roads in between.
State Route 91 (Regional)	Cairns Western Arterial Road, known in places (north to south) as: Brinsmead–Kamerunga Road; Redlynch Bypass Road; Reservoir Road; Pease Street; Alfred Street; McCormack Street; Mccoombe Street	Smithfield	Kamerunga	Mooroobool	14.1 km (9 mi)	This route is an alternative to the Bruce Highway for traffic passing through Cairns
State Route 92 (Regional)	City Road; James Street; Beaudesert–Beenleigh Road	Beenleigh	Windaroo	Tamborine	28.1 km (17 mi)	
State Route 93 (Regional)	Ipswich–Boonah Road; Coronation Drive (Boonah); Yeates Avenue (Boonah); Boonah–Rathdowney Road	Yamanto	Boonah	Rathdowney	87.8 km (55 mi)	Duplexed with between Coulson (a locality 7 km (4 mi) north of Boonah) and Boonah. Duplexed with from Boonah to Rathdowney.
State Route 94 (Regional)	Browns Plains Road; Chambers Flat Road; Kingston Road; Albert Street; Logan River Road; Hammel Street; Milne Street; Main Street; Gold Coast rail line overpass	Browns Plains	Waterford West	Beenleigh	21.7 km (13 mi)	
State Route 95 (Brisbane)	Wellington Road; Logan Road; Old Cleveland Road (also State Route 22); Montague Street; Kingston Road (part is also State Route 94); Albert Street (Waterford West and Waterford, also State Route 94); Nerang Street; Waterford–Tamborine Road; Albert Street (Logan Village); Tamborine Mountain Road; Geissmann Drive; Eagle Heights Road; Long Road; Macdonnell Road; Tamborine–Oxenford Road; Leo Graham Way	East Brisbane	Tamborine	Oxenford	86.7 km (54 mi)	The northern part of Wellington Road is one-way northbound.
State Route 96 (Regional)	Drayton Street; D'Aguilar Highway; Haly Street	Nanango		Kingaroy	24.8 km (15 mi)	
State Route 97 (Regional)	Nerang–Murwillumbah Road	Nerang	Advancetown and Numinbah Valley	Queensland – New South Wales border at Natural Bridge	36.4 km (23 mi)	Route continues as Numinbah Road to Murwillumbah
State Route 98 (Regional)	Duringan Street; Currumbin Creek Road; Tomewin Mountain Road	Currumbin	Currumbin Valley	Queensland – New South Wales border at Tomewin	19 km (12 mi)	Route continues as Tomewin Road to Murwillumbah
State Route 99 (Regional)	Gold Coast-Springbrook Road; Springbrook Road	Mudgeeraba		Springbrook	29.5 km (18 mi)	

== Tourist drives ==
Tourist drives in Queensland include numbered and un-numbered routes. Most routes have an official name, but some have been named based on the region in which they occur. Some duplication of numbers exists where the Queensland Government and a local authority have each chosen the same number for use in different regions.

== See also ==
- List of road routes in the Australian Capital Territory
- List of road routes in New South Wales
- List of road routes in the Northern Territory
- List of road routes in South Australia
- List of road routes in Tasmania
- List of road routes in Victoria
- List of road routes in Western Australia
- List of highways in Queensland
