= Southport–Burleigh Road =

Road in Gold Coast, Australia

Southport–Burleigh Road Queensland

General information
- Type: Road
- Length: 17.9 km (11 mi)
- Route number(s): State Route 3

Major junctions
- North end: North Street (State Route 10), Southport
- Queen Street (State Route 20); Ashmore Road (State Route 24); Nerang–Broadbeach Road (State Route 90); Burleigh Connection Road (State Route 80)
- South end: Pacific Motorway (M1), Burleigh Heads

Location(s)
- Major suburbs: Surfers Paradise, Bundall, Broadbeach Waters, Burleigh Waters

Southport–Burleigh Road is a road in the city of Gold Coast in the Australian state of Queensland. It is designated as State Route 3 and runs 17.9 km (11.1 mi) from Southport to Burleigh Heads. It includes four former suburban streets, which are still known locally by their original names. They are (from north to south):

- High Street
- Ferry Road
- Bundall Road
- Bermuda Street

It is a state-controlled district road (number 103).

== High Street ==
High Street starts at an intersection with Stevens Street and runs south-west to North Street, where it turns south-east and becomes part of Southport-Burleigh Road. It continues through the Southport CBD until it reaches Queen Street, where it becomes Ferry Road.

== Major intersections ==
The road is in the Gold Coast local government area.

Location	km	mi	Destinations	Notes
Southport	0	0.0	North Street (State Route 10) – west – (via Smith Street Motorway – Molendinar / Gaven east – Southport / High Street – north (via Gold Coast Highway) – Labrador	Northern end of Southport–Burleigh Road (State Route 3); Continues south as High Street.
Southport	1.1	0.68	Queen Street (State Route 20) – west (via Nerang Street) – Ashmore / east – Southport	This intersection marks the southern end of High Street and the northern end of Ferry Road
Bundall, Surfers Paradise, Southport tripoint	4.0	2.5	Slayter Avenue – west – Ashmore / Thomas Drive – east – Surfers Paradise	This intersection marks the southern end of Ferry Road and the northern end of Bundall Road
Surfers Paradise, Bundall border	5.5– 5.6	3.4– 3.5	Ashmore Road (State Route 24) – west – Bundall, Benowa / Salerno Street (State Route 24) – east – Surfers Paradise	This intersection marks the approximate southern end of Bundall Road and the northern end of Bermuda Street
Broadbeach Waters, Clear Island Waters, Mermaid Waters tripoint	8.3	5.2	Nerang–Broadbeach Road (State Route 90) – north–west – Carrara / Hooker Boulevard (State Route 90) – east – Broadbeach	
Burleigh Waters, Burleigh Heads border	16.1	10.0	Burleigh Connection Road (State Route 80) – west – Reedy Creek east – Burleigh Heads	
Burleigh Heads	17.9	11.1	Pacific Motorway (State Route M1) – north–west – Reedy Creek / east – Palm Beach, Elanora	Southern end of Southport–Burleigh Road
1.000 mi = 1.609 km; 1.000 km = 0.621 mi: Route transition

== See also ==
- List of road routes in Queensland
- List of numbered roads in Queensland
