= Robina Parkway =

Road on the Gold Coast, Queensland

Robina Parkway Queensland

General information
- Type: Road
- Length: 6.8 km (4.2 mi)
- Route number(s): State Route 7

Major junctions
- North end: Nerang–Broadbeach Road (State Route 90), Carrara
- Gooding Drive (State Route 50 / State Route 90); Markeri Street; Cheltenham Drive; Scottsdale Drive
- South end: Pacific Motorway (M1), Robina

Robina Parkway (State Route 7) is a major road on the Gold Coast, Queensland. The road begins at the overpass of the Pacific Motorway and travels through the suburb of Robina before termination in Carrara at the intersection with Gooding Drive (State Route 50) and Nerang–Broadbeach Road (State Route 90).

== Major intersections ==
The entire road is in the Gold Coast local government area.

Location	km	mi	Destinations	Notes
Carrara, Merrimac, Clear Island Waters border	0	0.0	Gooding Drive (State Route 50) – south–west – Merrimac / Nerang–Broadbeach Road (State Route 90) – north – Carrara / Gooding Drive (becomes Nerang–Broadbeach Road after 0.5 km) (State Route 90) – east – Broadbeach	Northern end of Robina Parkway (State Route 7)
Clear Island Waters, Mermaid Waters, Robina border	2.7	1.7	Markeri Street – west – Robina / – east – Mermaid Beach	
Robina	4.0	2.5	Cheltenham Drive – west – Robina Town Centre / – east – Mermaid Waters	Access to Bond University
Robina	5.3– 6.0	3.3– 3.7	Scottsdale Drive – north – Robina Town Centre / – south – Varsity Lakes	
Robina	6.3	3.9	Laver Drive – north–west – Robina railway station / Robina Town Centre access road – north–east – Robina Town Centre	
Robina, Mudgeeraba border	6.6– 6.8	4.1– 4.2	Pacific Motorway (State Route M1) – north–west – Nerang / south–east – Burleigh Heads / Somerset Drive – south, then west – Mudgeeraba	Southern end of Robina Parkway
1.000 mi = 1.609 km; 1.000 km = 0.621 mi
