= Burleigh Connection Road =

Road in Queensland, Australia

Burleigh Connection Road Queensland

General information
- Type: Road
- Length: 3.7 km (2.3 mi)
- Route number(s): State Route 80

Major junctions
- West end: Pacific Motorway, Varsity Lakes
- Southport–Burleigh Road State Route 3
- East end: West Burleigh Road State Route 80, Burleigh Heads

Location(s)
- Major suburbs: Varsity Lakes, Burleigh Waters, Burleigh Heads

Burleigh Connection Road (State Route 80) is a major arterial road connecting the Pacific Motorway with the Gold Coast suburb of Burleigh Heads.

It is a state-controlled district road (number 102).

== Route Description ==
Burleigh Connection Road is a 3.7 kilometer, 4 lane road that connects Burleigh Heads with the Pacific Motorway on the western end of Varsity Lakes. The road commences at the Intersection of Scottsdale Road and the exit and entry ramps of the Pacific Motorway in Varsity Lakes and travels east through Burleigh Waters and provides a connection to Southport–Burleigh Road before terminating at West Burleigh Road opposite Stocklands Burleigh Heads Shopping Centre. State Route 80 does continue on as West Burleigh Road for another 1.6 kilometers before finally terminating at the Gold Coast Highway in central Burleigh Heads.

== Major Intersections ==
Below is a list of major intersections for Burleigh Connection Road. The road is in the Gold Coast local government area.

Location	km	mi	Destinations	Notes
Varsity Lakes	0	0.0	Pacific Motorway (State Route M1) Northbound – Robina Southbound – Palm Beach	Western terminus of road
Burleigh Waters	2.9	1.8	Southport–Burleigh Road (State Route 3) Northbound – Varsity Lakes Southbound – Pacific Motorway (State Route M1)	
Burleigh Heads	3.7	2.3	West Burleigh Road (State Route 80) Northbound – Burleigh Heads Southbound – West Burleigh	Eastern terminus of Burleigh Connection Road but state route continues on for 1.7 kilometers as West Burleigh Road before terminating in central Burleigh Heads.
1.000 mi = 1.609 km; 1.000 km = 0.621 mi

== See also ==
- List of numbered roads in Queensland
