= Andrews, Queensland =

Andrews
- Suburb
- Interactive map of Andrews
- Coordinates: 28°05′25″S 153°24′50″E
- Country: Australia
- State: Queensland
- City: Gold Coast
- LGA: City of Gold Coast

Government
  - Federal division: Moncrieff
- Postcode: 4220
Suburbs around Andrews
Varsity Lakes	Burleigh Waters	Burleigh Heads
Reedy Creek	Andrews	Palm Beach
Reedy Creek	Tallebudgera Valley	Tallebudgera Valley

Andrews is a former suburb of the City of Gold Coast, Queensland, Australia.

== History ==
Andrews was created as a suburb in 1981 and named after a family who owned a large amount of the land in the area. In 2002, the suburb of Andrews was merged with Burleigh Heads. Andrews is no longer an official placename.

== See also ==
- Suburbs of the Gold Coast
