= Bermuda Street =

Road in Queensland, Australia

Bermuda Street Queensland

General information
- Type: Road
- Length: 12 km (7.5 mi)
- Route number(s): State Route 3

Major junctions
- North end: Bundall Road (State Route 3), Bundall
- Nerang–Broadbeach Road (State Route 90); Burleigh Connection Road (State Route 80)
- South end: Pacific Motorway (M1), Burleigh Heads

Location(s)
- Major suburbs: Robina

Bermuda Street is a road on the Gold Coast from Bundall to Burleigh Heads in Queensland, Australia. Originally a suburban street, it is now part of Southport–Burleigh Road, a state controlled road (State Route 3)

The highest point of the road is 22 metres at the junction with the Pacific Motorway in Burleigh Heads (Southern End).

Bermuda Street is the southern extension of Bundall Road (a much older thoroughfare) across the Nerang River and through many newer suburbs to the Pacific Motorway at Burleigh Heads. Not all maps agree on the precise point at which the name changes, but the most commonly accepted is at the intersection with Boomerang Crescent, about 300 metres south of the intersection of Bundall Road with Ashmore Road.

== Major intersections ==
- Nerang–Broadbeach Road (west) / Hooker Boulevard (east) (State Route 90)
- Markeri Street
- Cottesloe Drive
- Christine Avenue
- Burleigh Connection Road (State Route 80)
