= Marymount College, Gold Coast =

Marymount College

Location
- Burleigh Waters, Gold Coast, Queensland; Australia; 28°6′3″S 153°25′50″E

Information
- Type: Independent day school
- Motto: Latin: Deus Meus Et Omnia (My God, My All)
- Denomination: Roman Catholic
- Established: 1968; 58 years ago
- Principal: John Christie
- Employees: ~125
- Years offered: 7–12
- Gender: Co-educational
- Enrolment: ~1,400
- Campus type: Suburban
- Colours: Navy blue, royal blue, light blue & white
- Website: marymount.qld.edu.au

Marymount College is an independent Roman Catholic co-educational secondary school located at Burleigh Waters on the Gold Coast in Queensland, Australia. It was established in 1968 by Frank Shine. Marymount College is the largest Catholic High School (7–12 only) and the furtherest south non-Government high school on the Queensland coastline.

== History ==
Marymount College opened in 1968 as a parish secondary school for girls operated by the Missionary Franciscan Sisters of the Immaculate Conception, with sixteen students and two staff.

The school soon after become coeducational – becoming the first coeducational non-state school in Queensland.

The school complex (110 acres of land with classrooms, a convent, and a chapel) at Burleigh Waters cost $146,000. The Franciscan nuns left the convent and school in 1994, and the convent was demolished in 2013.

School expansion started almost immediately, with the first extension being built in 1971 and the first new building in 1974. The school has since seen extensive expansion, with new buildings or wings being added every few years. The most recent addition was in 2015, giving the current campus complex.

In 1972 the school became co-educational and enrolment reached 120. The first senior class was in 1974, and by 1982 enrolment had reached 620. In 1999, 905 students were enrolled, and 1,110 students in 2010. A Year 8 classroom building was added in 1987, and Year 7 was added in 2015.

As of 2022, Marymount College now has over 1,250 students and 100 staff. Major re-developments of the College took place in 2022 in vision of a new Masterplan.

== Notable alumni ==
=== Aquatics ===
- Brittany Broben – diver
- Daniel Kowalski – swimmer
- Ryan Napoleon – swimmer

=== Australian rules football ===
- David Hale – Hawthorn, North Melbourne
- Andrew Raines – Brisbane, Gold Coast, Richmond
- Bronte Parker – Gold Coast

=== Entertainment ===
- Carl Barron – comedian
- Holly Brisley – actress
- Paul O'Brien – actor
- Thomas Weatherall – actor and playwright

=== Rugby league ===
- Cooper Bai – Gold Coast Titans
- Karina Brown – Queensland State of Origin, Australian Jillaroos Captain
- Xavier Coates – Queensland State of Origin
- Jamie Dowling – Gold Coast Titans
- Sophie Holyman – Queensland State of Origin

=== Other ===
- Ellie Beer – Olympic runner
- Heather Burke – archaeologist
- Jacob Clear – canoeist
- Shannon Fentiman – politician
- Kelly Layne – dressage rider
- Ken Wallace – kayaker

== Notable staff ==
- Matt Geyer

== AFL Team Achievements ==
=== Junior Female (Years 7–9) ===
- AFL Queensland Schools Cup

(bronze) Third Place: 2021, 2024

== See also ==
- List of schools in Gold Coast, Queensland
- Catholic education in Australia
