= Stephens, Queensland =

Coordinates: 28°6′28″S 153°25′26″E

Stephens is a former suburb of the City of Gold Coast, Queensland, Australia.

== History ==
Stephens was named after the Stephens Swamp, an area of wetlands between Reedy Creek and Burleigh Heads. The swamp, in turn, was named after Thomas Blacket Stephens who purchased 6980 acres of hinterland in 1873 to drain it into Little Tallebudgera Creek to create land for dairy farming.

In the 1980s, Stephens began to develop a suburban character.

Bond University was established in Stephens in 1987 when the Parliament of Queensland granted it university status via the passage of the Bond University Act. The University commenced teaching in May 1989 with an initial intake of 322 students.

In 2002, the suburb of Stephens was renamed to Varsity Lakes. A section of Stephens in the north was renamed to Robina. Stephens is no longer an official placename.

== See also ==
- Suburbs of the Gold Coast
