= Nimmel Range =

Mountain range in Queensland, Australia

Nimmel
- Location within Queensland

Highest point
- Peak: Mount Nimmel
- Elevation: 489 m (1,604 ft)

Geography
- Country: Australia
- State: Queensland
- Region: South East Queensland
- District: Gold Coast Hinterland
- Range coordinates: 28°11′S 153°18′E

The Nimmel Range is a small mountain range inside the Gold Coast Hinterland on the Gold Coast, Queensland, Australia. Its most prominent feature is the 489 metre peak of Mount Nimmel. It lies at co-ordinates latitude: 28° 10' 60" S, longitude: 153° 18' 0" E and is 20 kilometres (12 mi) away from Carrara, an inland suburb of the Gold Coast near Nerang. It was the western border of the Austinville banana plantation before the settlement was all but abandoned in the 1930s.

== Historic Significance ==
The Nimmel Range was the western border of the Austinville banana plantation started in 1934 and abandoned in 1939. Earlier, in the very early 1900s, before Springbrook Road was built, early settlers sought to provide access to Springbrook Mountain from the coast. Jim Hardy and George Trapp, two pioneers of the day, tried following the ridge that separates the east and west branches of Little Nerang Creek, reached the join, turned east and found that the Nimmel Range blocked their path. The road was completed by skirting around the foot of Mount Nimmel and continuing to Springbrook. To this day, Springbrook Road remains the sole link from the mountain to the rest of the Gold Coast.

== See also ==
- List of mountains of Australia
