= Gold Coast hinterland =

Scenic area and region of South East Queensland, Australia

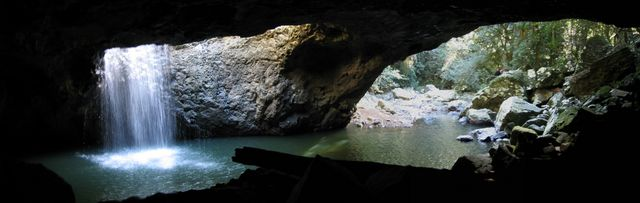
The Natural Bridge, 2004

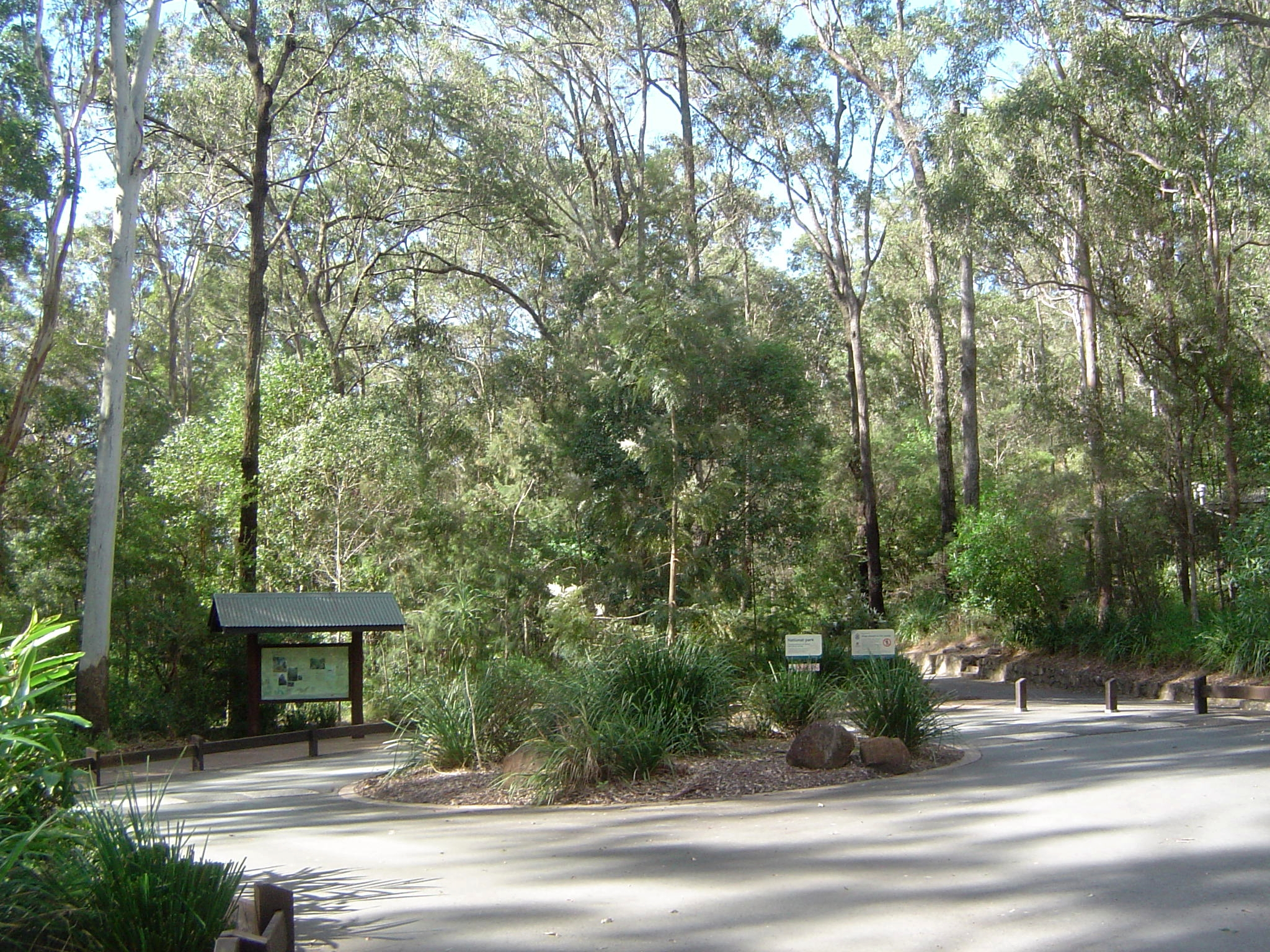
Cedar Creek Falls in Tamborine National Park, 2011

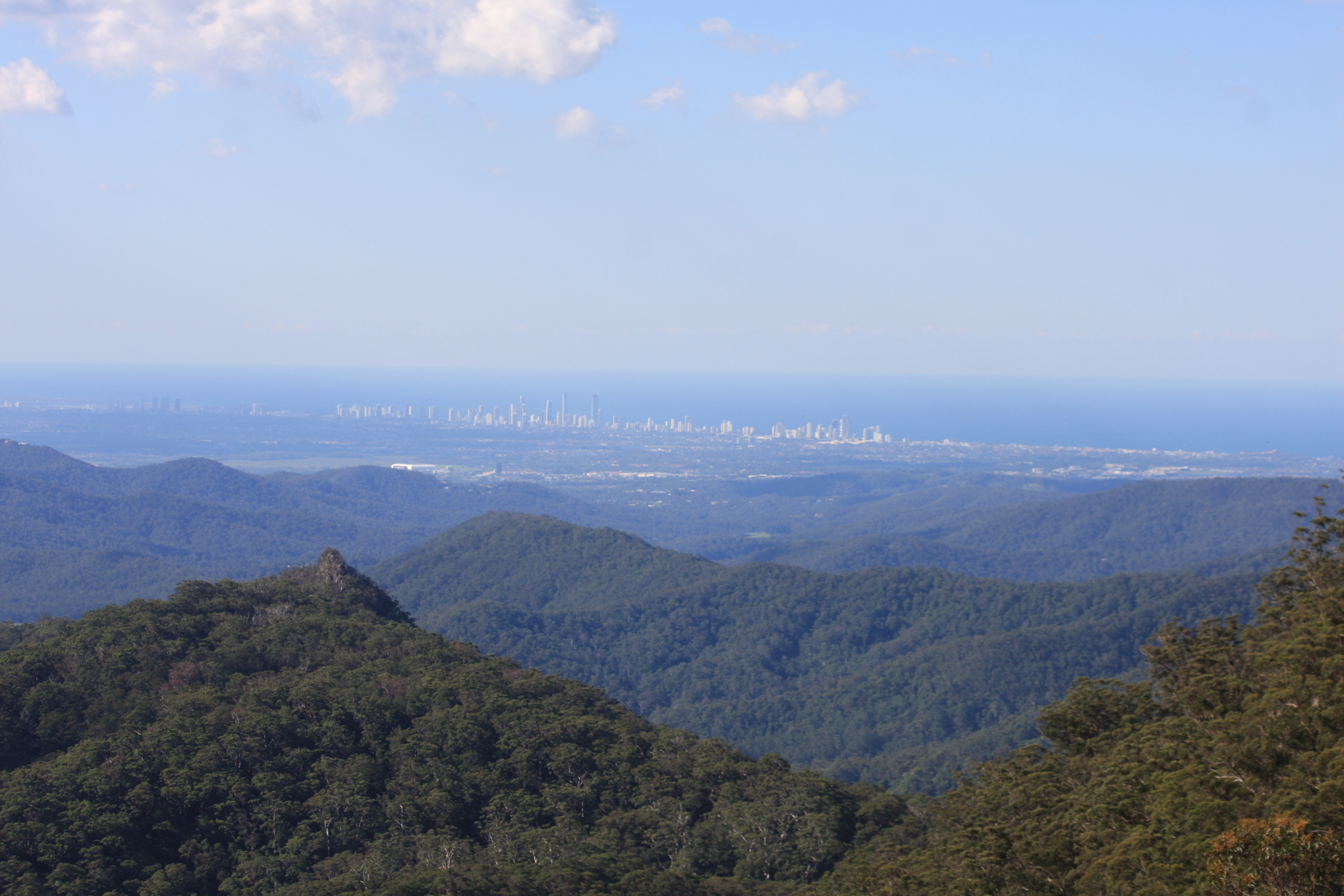
View towards the coast from Springbrook. The Surfers Paradise skyline can be seen in the distance.

The Gold Coast hinterland is an area of South East Queensland, Australia which comprises the Tweed Range, Nimmel Range, Tamborine Mountain, Numinbah Valley, eastern parts of the McPherson Range and western parts of suburban Gold Coast, such as Mudgeeraba. This undefined unit of area is known for its tourist attractions including resorts, rainforest, lookouts, national parks, its diversity of fauna and flora and as a green backdrop to the coastal strip. It overlaps part of the Scenic Rim and is part of both the City of Gold Coast and Scenic Rim Region and includes Springbrook, Binna Burra and O'Reilly.

== History ==
The comprehensive exploration of the area was conducted only as late as 1842. Surveyors attempting to map the Queensland/New South Wales border during the 1860s were hampered by the rough terrain and plateaus. Shortly after timber-getters passed Numinbah Gap from the Tweed Valley, establishing a route from the Tweed region to Brisbane that was later used by coach and bullock teams. In 1907, Witches Falls was protected by Queensland's first national park declaration.

In September 2019 the area was affected by a severe bushfire season. Binna Burra Lodge was destroyed in the fires.

In December 2023, severe storms affected the area. The storms included a tornado which caused widespread destruction.

== Tourism ==
In the Gold Coast hinterland there are various scenic attractions and guesthouses that have led to the development of a vibrant tourism industry, providing a major attraction for visitors to the Gold Coast and people living in the region. Visitor surveys to the hinterland's parks and forests indicate the area is one of Queensland's most significant tourist destinations. Wine-tasting, bird-feeding, eco-tourism and bushwalking are some of the pastimes that attract visitors to the hinterland. Other attractions in the area include O'Reilly's Guesthouse, the Natural Bridge and Binna Burra Lodge. In March 2008, the Gold Coast Hinterland Great Walk connecting the Lamington and Springbrook plateaus was opened. The moderately difficult walking trail provides 54 kilometres (34 mi) of uninterrupted track and takes three days to walk from start to finish. The Kooralbyn Valley Resort within the Gold Coast hinterland was once considered a luxurious hideaway for the late media magnate Kerry Packer.

== Geography ==
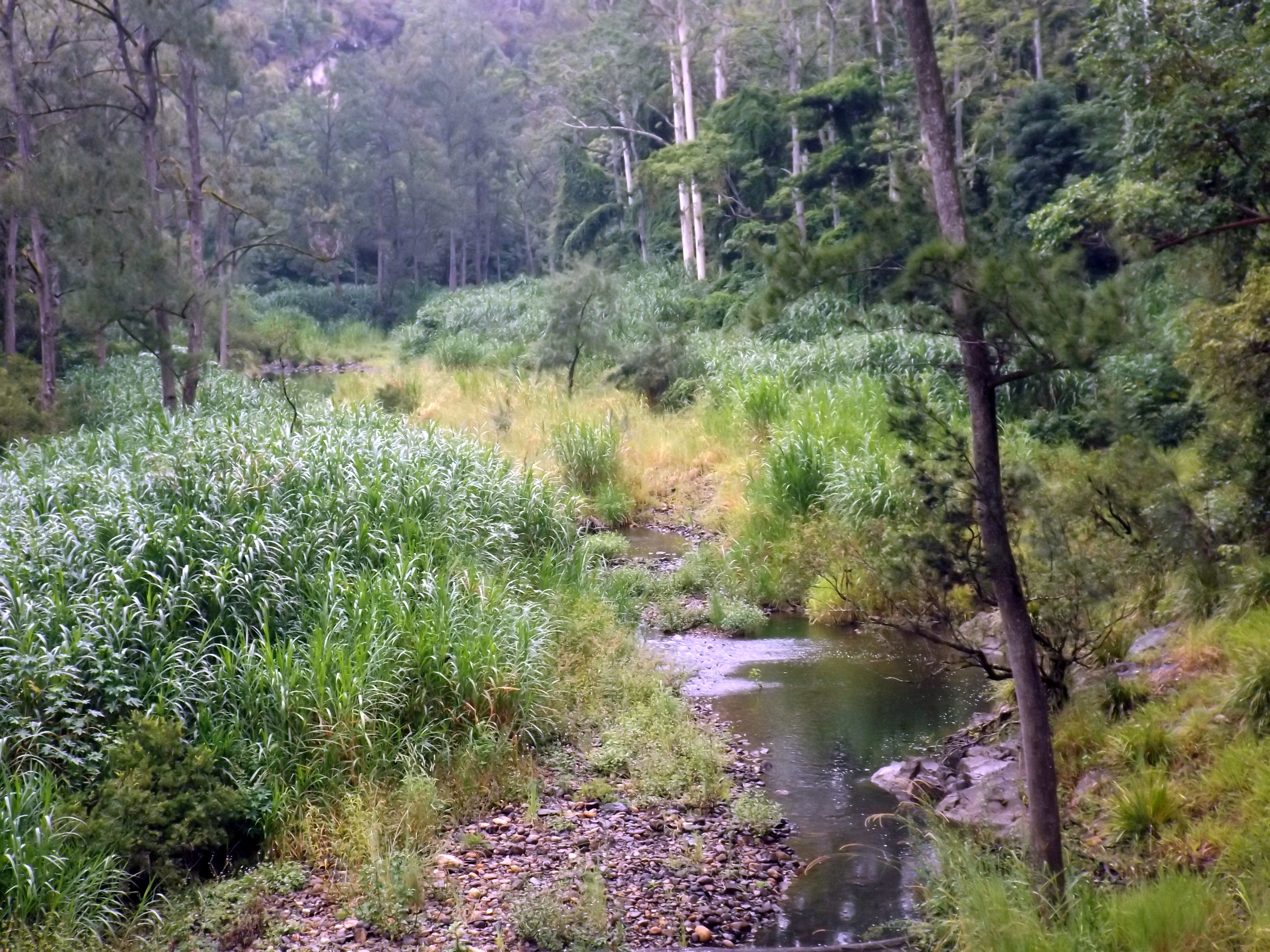
Nerang River in Numinbah Valley, 2016

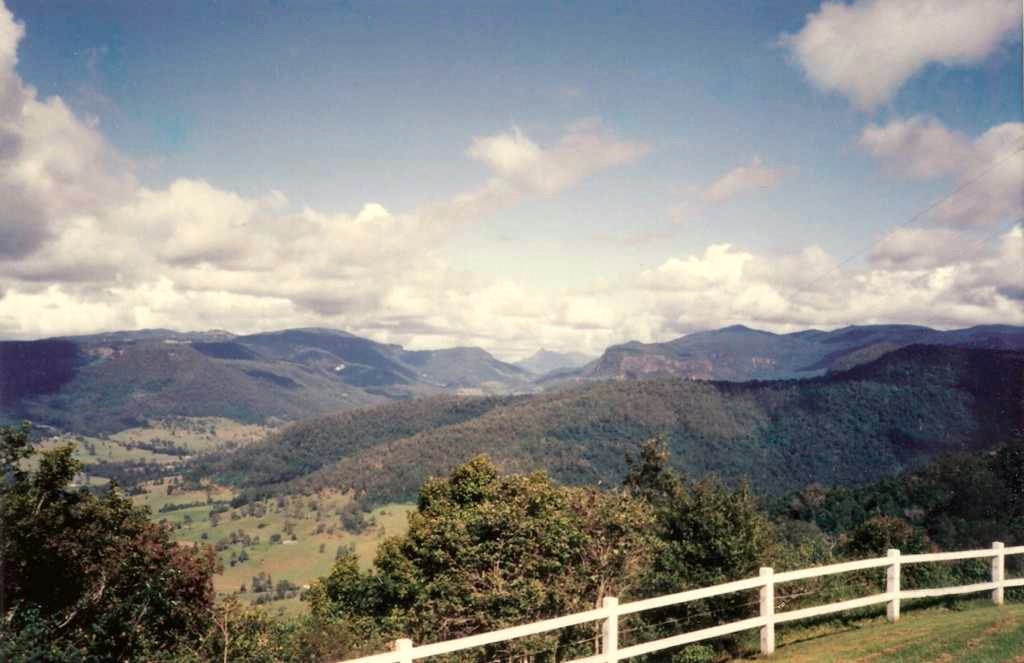
Numinbah Valley, 1994

This elevated area is part of the Great Dividing Range and contains the headwaters for a number of rivers and creeks including the Coomera River, Nerang River, Pimpama River, Tallebudgera Creek and Currumbin Creek. Some of the highest mountains in the hinterland are Mount Nimmel (489 metres (1,604 ft)), Tamborine Mountain (525 metres (1,722 ft)), Mount Cougal (739 metres (2,425 ft)), Tallebudgera Mountain (664 metres (2,178 ft)) and Springbrook Mountain (900 metres (3,000 ft)). In New South Wales to the south are the Tweed Valley and Border Ranges, while the Scenic Rim overlaps and extends westwards from the hinterland.

=== Suburbs and townships ===
Land use in the hinterland is divided between protected areas and rural residential living. On the eastern foothills of the hinterland lie the Gold Coast suburbs of Mudgeeraba, Tallebudgera, Guanaba, Cedar Creek, Wongawallan, Mt Nathan, Maudsland and Nerang. There are a number of small villages like Advancetown, Beechmont, Lower Beechmont and Canungra that are considered part of the hinterland.

At the foot of Mount Nimmel lies Austinville and beyond, the towering plateau of Springbrook Mountain, on top of which lies a small township by the same name.

=== Protected areas ===
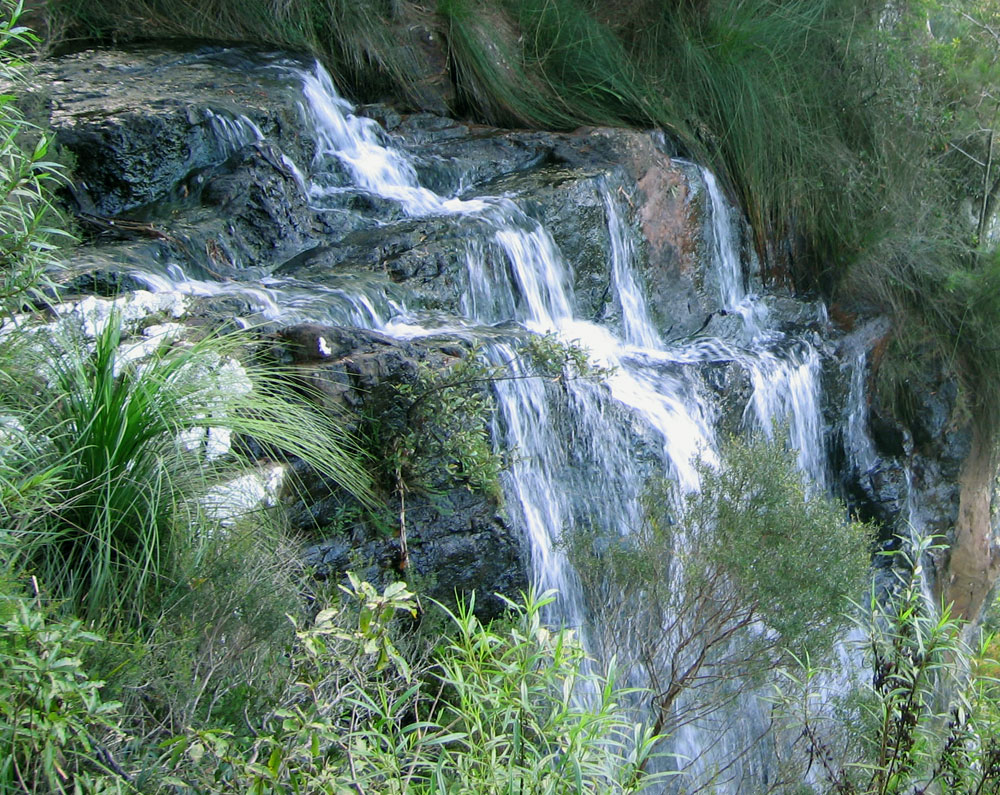
Goomoolahra Falls on the Springbrook Plateau

The region has significant natural heritage that is preserved in national parks and has been a major tourist drawcard. Much of the national parks are UNESCO World Heritage-listed as well as listed nationally as part of the Gondwana Rainforests of Australia. Springbrook National Park covers 2,720 hectares (6,700 acres) of rainforest, plenty of which is accessible by walking trails. Remnants of early forestry history remain; there are several waterfalls, including the famous Purlingbrook Falls, and also many gorges and much rainforest.

Lamington National Park covers 20,590 hectares (50,900 acres) of rainforest, consisting mainly of two sections, the Green Mountains and Binna Burra. The longest available walk is 24 kilometres (15 mi), about 8 hours walking time. Tamborine National Park covers 1,160 hectares (2,900 acres) of the Tamborine Mountain, a remnant of the once giant Tweed Volcano.

Closer to the coast, although not technically part of the hinterland, is the Currumbin Valley Reserve.

== See also ==
- Regions of Queensland
- Road routes in Gold Coast
- Tourism in Australia
