= Springbrook Road =

Heritage-listed road in Queensland, Australia

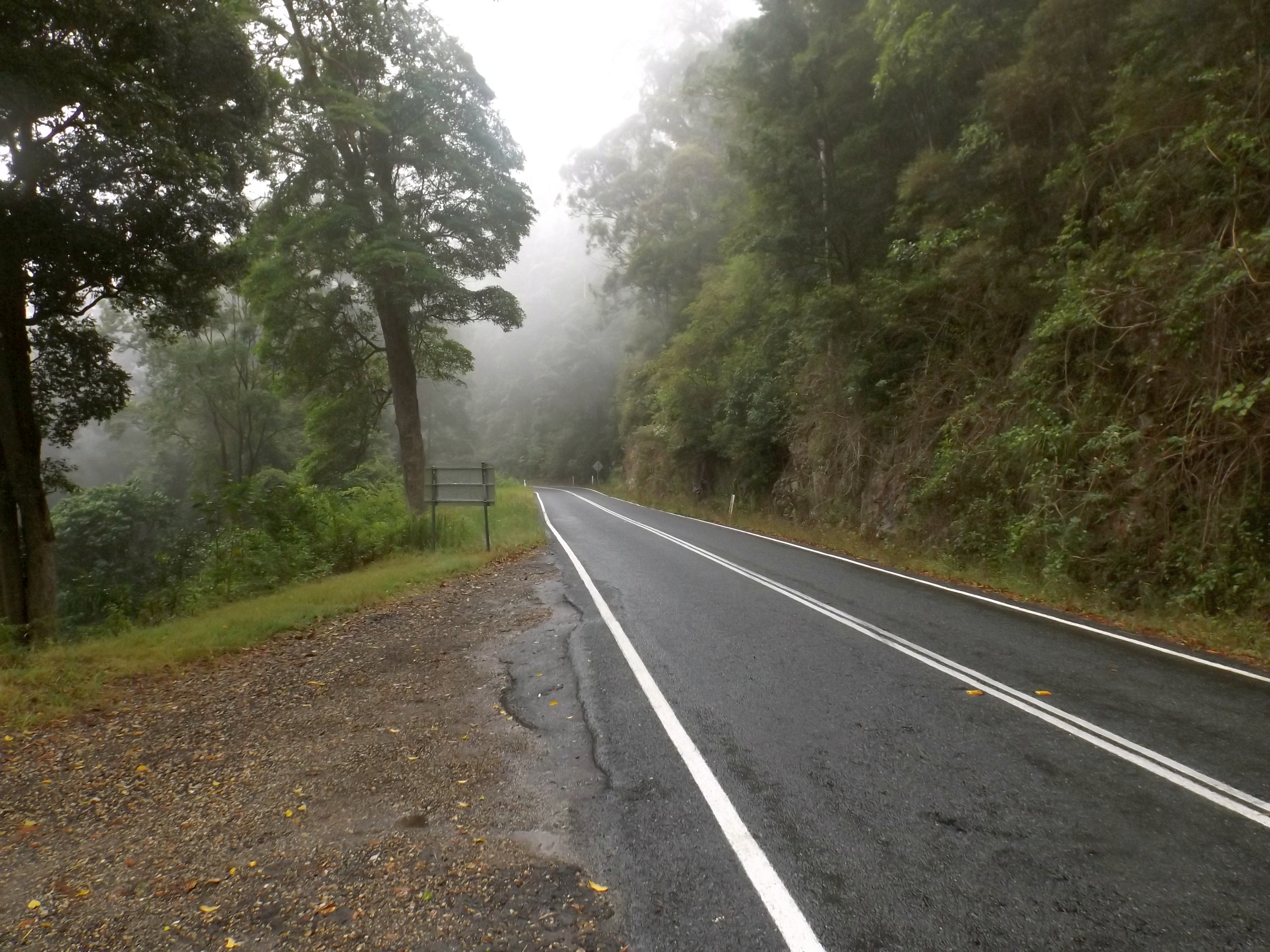
- Springbrook Road in 2016

- Location within Queensland Location within Australia
- 28.1373°S 153.2787°E
- Location: Springbrook–Mudgeeraba Road, Springbrook, Gold Coast City, Queensland, Australia

History
- Design period: 1919–1930s (interwar period)
- Built: 1925–1928

Queensland Heritage Register
- Official name: Springbrook Road and Associated Infrastructure, Memorial Cairn, Springbrook Mudgeeraba Road, Toll Road
- Type: state heritage (built)
- Designated: 22 October 1999
- Reference no.: 602140
- Significant period: 1920s (fabric)
- Significant components: cutting – road, plaque, lookout/observation platform, trough – drinking, bridge/viaduct – road, memorial – cairn, fountain

Springbrook Road is a heritage-listed road at Springbrook–Mudgeeraba Road, Springbrook, Gold Coast City, Queensland, Australia. It was built from 1925 to 1928. It is also known as Memorial Cairn, Springbrook–Mudgeeraba Road, and Toll Road. It is part of State Route 99. It was added to the Queensland Heritage Register on 22 October 1999. The road has been closed from Little Nerang Dam since Cyclone Debbie with repairs expected to be completed before 2019.

This road consists of two separate state-controlled roads as defined by the Department of Transport and Main Roads (TMR). The part from Mudgeeraba to the Pine Creek Road intersection in Springbrook is named Gold Coast–Springbrook Road (number 104) and the other, from that intersection to the end, is named Springbrook Road (number 2015). Both roads are part of the district network and are rated as local roads of regional significance (LRRS).

== History ==
=== Construction ===
The Springbrook–Mudgeeraba Road was constructed to encourage settlement and development in the Springbrook area in the mid 1920s. Several elements including two curved timber bridges, a water trough and a water fountain date from this early construction time.

The difficulty of access to the Springbrook plateau was a significant factor in the delay of settlement. Prior to settlement in 1906, the only access consisted of a walking trail on the western side that ended up in the Numinbah Valley. Once land was advertised for selection, the Queensland Lands Department was required to provide a road.

The early settlers knew that for their farms to succeed, reliable access was necessary. The determination to provide an alternate route off the mountain resulted in two tracks being brushed through the forest. One headed off the southern end of the plateau towards the village of Mudgeeraba. Jim Hardy and George Trapp blazed the Mudgeeraba track by following the ridge that separates the east and west branches of Little Nerang Creek. When they reached the confluence of the two creeks they turned east, only to find that the Nimmel Range blocked their way. By skirting round the flanks of Mount Nimmel, they managed to reach the dirt track that linked Mudgeeraba with the little cluster of farms near Neranwood.

By 1914 the track was upgraded to allow horse-drawn wagons known as "buckboards" to negotiate the rough terrain. It coiled its way off the mountain down present-day Carrick Road and beyond to the meeting of the east of west branches of the Little Nerang Creek, over the Mount Nimmel Range and on through the Austinville Valley before joining the present road at the Austinville turn-off. The first Springbrook to Mudgeeraba road was an improvement on the brushed track.

After several deputations in the 1920s to the Minister for Main Roads, it was decided to survey a new route onto the mountain. The gradient required for such an undertaking was of much concern to the surveyors. A gradient of 1 in 18 was considered to be the limit for successful road building in Queensland at the time. The deputations from the Springbrook residents must have been very persuasive as the proposed Springbrook road required a gradient of 1 in 12 and in parts 1 in 10. It is believed to be the first road in Queensland to have been successfully constructed using such a steep gradient. A Swiss engineer named Juries was employed to conduct the initial survey, due to his experience in mountainous country. Fred Parkes, the Main Roads engineer and Tom Peters who represented the Nerang Shire, were grateful for his expertise. The terrain was so rough and steep that it was necessary to dig toeholds into the sheer hillsides, to enable the men to safely carry the delicate survey instruments to the next position.

Tenders were called for each 1.5 miles (2.4 km) of surveyed section and C.J. Hicks, a road contractor from northern New South Wales, tendered successfully for the construction of the new road. He commenced work at Rathbone's crossing in March 1925 and reached the eastern bank of the Little Nerang Creek in February 1926. Just over 3 miles (4.8 km) of road had been constructed at a cost of £15,500. The section between Neranwood and Wunburra proved to be the most difficult of all. Work commenced in September 1925 and it took until November 1928 to complete the 4 miles (6.4 km) of backbreaking road work at a cost of £20,000.

The men employed on the road had a camp on the ridge that runs between Big Gully and Watertrough Gully. These were the two greatest natural obstacles to the construction of a road and where the construction gang would spend most of its time. The provision of living quarters for the men was governed by specific regulations. A single man had to be supplied with a canvas tent measuring 6 by 8 feet (1.8 by 2.4 m). A married man was entitled to a tent measuring 8 by 10 feet (2.4 by 3.0 m), and if he brought his family along, a tent measuring 10 by 12 feet (3.0 by 3.7 m) was provided.

=== Completion ===
The road was officially opened in February 1928. The sign erected at the toll gates at the base of Wunburra Range, just above the present Neranwood Park, proclaimed the times that traffic was allowed to travel up or down the narrow one-way road. A speed limit of 12 miles (19 km) was recommended. It was called the Toll Road as a charge was payable for each journey up or down the mountain. During the 1930s the toll was nine pence each way, rising to one shilling in the 1940s. Mrs Leu, whose husband had worked on constructing the road, became the gatekeeper. She was on call 24 hours a day, irrespective of the weather or personal considerations and received the sum of 30 shillings a week. She took her responsibility very seriously, especially in the 1940s, when the timber jinkers were frequent users of the one-way. She would not allow any vehicle to pass if the time for the down traffic had just lapsed as it was always possible that a vehicle was still on the road. The toll was removed on 30 November 1945.

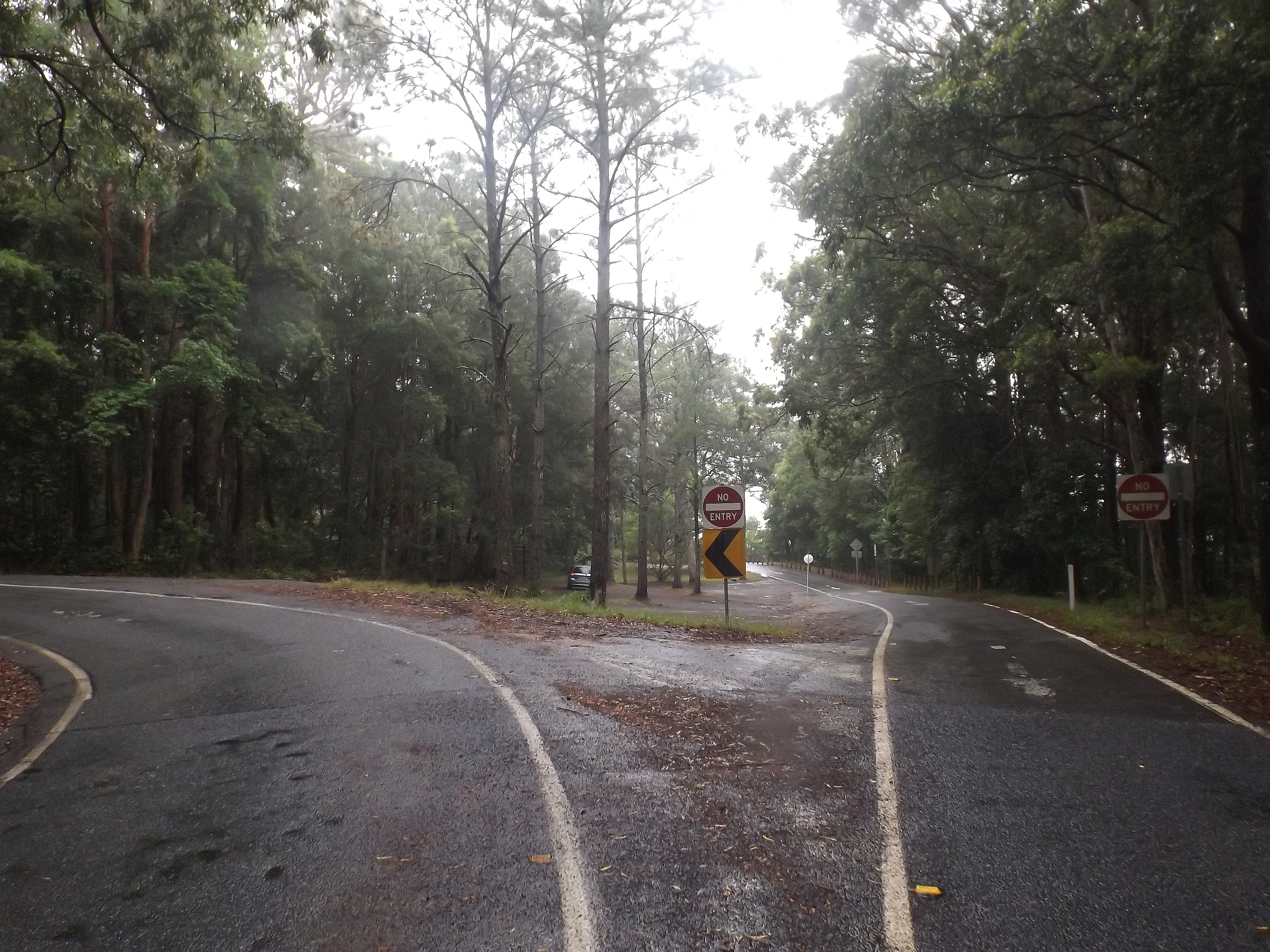
Divided section, 2016

The stone water trough was built by the men who constructed and maintained Springbrook Road, as the only watering point for their horses on the high mountain stretches. It is now used as a well and is a tourist attraction. Visitors make use of the opportunity to drink the clean spring water and collect some to take home. The gully is part of Wunburra, which means For Run Up Hill-Hunting Dog, which forms part of Springbrook National Park.

The curved wooden bridges were built by Charlie Kolb, a bridge builder. He built the first one over the Little Nerang for just over £5,000. The bridges are an unusual feature of the Springbrook–Mudgeeraba Road, in the fact that they were very early examples of this kind of bridge on a steeply sloped mountainous roadway to be built in Queensland. The timber decking has been replaced, and signs at both ends of the Springbrook–Mudgeeraba Road remind motorists that the bridges are not suitable for large vehicles.

A memorial cairns was constructed at Hardy's Lookout, off the Springbrook-Mudgeeraba Road in 1961 by the residents of Springbrook to celebrate the opening of the now heritage-listed Springbrook State School in 1911.

== Description ==
The Springbrook Road Complex commences at the intersection of Austinville Road and the Gold Coast – Springbrook Road. The road, which is bitumened and in all but four small sections two way, rises generally in a southerly direction over a distance of approximately 22.5 kilometres (14.0 mi). Features of the road infrastructure include:

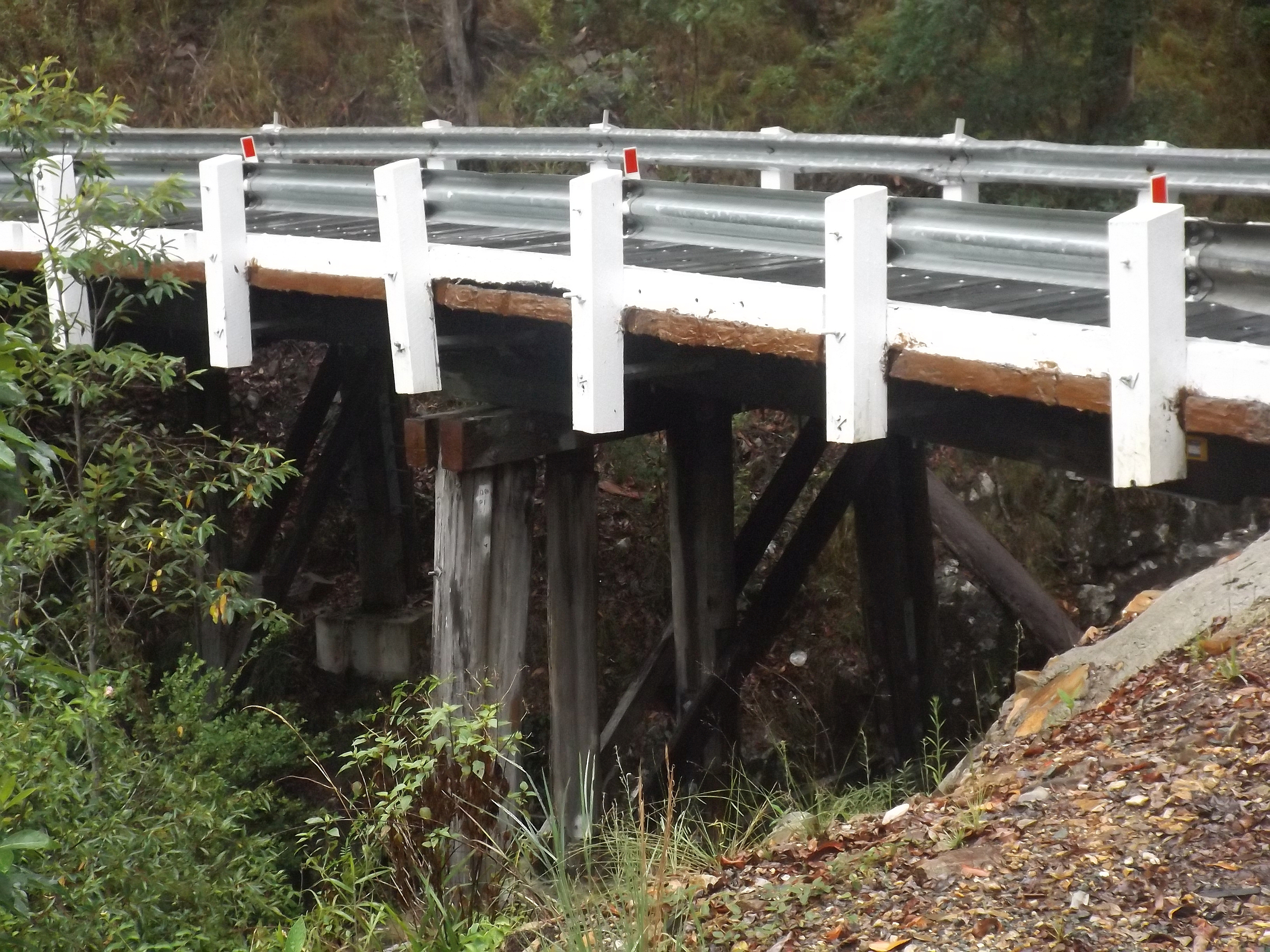
PTE Frederick Anderson Bridge, 2016

Two curved timber bridges, one approximately 4.5 kilometres (2.8 mi) from Austinville Road and the other about 2 kilometres (1.2 mi) further along the road. The bridges are constructed to skirt the side of the mountain in tight corners, removing the need for major cutting into the mountain or filling a valley at this point to create flat surfaces for the road to continue.

The bridges are constructed from a combination of round and squared hardwood, with support formed by round logs braced with pairs of squared members. A standard timber balustrade with ribbed metal safeguard strip has replaced an early timber balustrade. Recent timber decking covers both of the bridges, which are aligned with the adjacent bitumen road. The bridges provide access for only one lane of traffic and a give way sign on the north facing access road regulates traffic.

A one-way road section starting at 11.5 kilometres (7.1 mi) and finishing at about 12.5 kilometres (7.8 mi) from the Austinville Road is an unusual feature of the roadway. At the southern end of this part of the road is a water fountain and water trough fed from a nearby spring. The two rustic features are site near to one another on the mountain side of the road and being constructed of the stone of the mountain are barely discernible from the surrounding landscape. The trough is a long and heavy stone and concrete basin and the water fountain is formed from a stone and concrete plinth through which a fountain head is run to bubble on the top surface.

To the south of the Springbrook–Nerang Road intersection, the Springbrook–Mudgeeraba Road separates into two distinct roadways. The area of the lower, southern facing road is of high aesthetic with large dramatic cuttings of the mountainous volcanic stone surmounted by natural vegetation. To the east of this part of the roadway are fleeting but expansive views of the valley and lower areas below increasing the quality of sublimity of the area.

Wunburra Lookout is a small cleared area just off the roadway and is signed. It consists of a concrete and rock viewing platform looking out over the valley with a simple chain wire safety fence.

At Hardy's Lookout a small clearing to the west of the roadway near the entrance to Old School Road, is a small Memorial Cairn constructed of stone set in concrete and recording the names of pioneers of Springbrook from 1906. Nineteen names are recorded on a brass plaque. Surmounting the cairn is a flat brass disc is a north point with place direction references.

== Upgrades ==
A project to plan a future upgrade of Mudgeeraba Creek causeway was completed in early 2019.

== Heritage listing ==
Springbrook Road and Associated Infrastructure was listed on the Queensland Heritage Register on 22 October 1999 having satisfied the following criteria.

The place is important in demonstrating the evolution or pattern of Queensland's history.

The Springbrook Road Complex was important in the consolidation and expansion of the Springbrook region and also in providing access to Springbrook National Park. Prior to its completion access to the plateau had been extremely limited which seriously affected development of the area.

The place demonstrates rare, uncommon or endangered aspects of Queensland's cultural heritage.

The trough and water fountain are remnants of an earlier use of the road when horses were used. The survival of these elements is a rare and unusual element of the Springbrook–Mudgeeraba Road.

The place is important because of its aesthetic significance.

The Springbrook-Mudgeeraba Road has aesthetic significance as a picturesque place, where the natural rock formations and vegetation are juxtaposed with early evidence of man-made road cuttings and road construction. Lookouts that allow motorists to stop and enjoy the panoramic views have been popular since the road's completion. These include Wunburra Lookout, and Hardy's Lookout.

The place is important in demonstrating a high degree of creative or technical achievement at a particular period.

It is understood that this road was the first in Queensland to have been successfully constructed using a steep gradient of 1 in 12 and, in parts, 1 in 10.

The curved timber bridges have technological significance, as they are very early examples of this kind to be built in Queensland.

The place has a strong or special association with a particular community or cultural group for social, cultural or spiritual reasons.

The Pioneer Memorial Cairn, included within the heritage register boundary at Hardy's Lookout, has social significance as a record of the early Springbrook settlers.

== See also ==
- List of numbered roads in Queensland
