= Bundall Road =

Australian road

Bundall Road Queensland

General information
- Type: Road
- Length: 1.9 km (1.2 mi)
- Route number(s): State Route 3

Major junctions
- North end: Ferry Road (State Route 3)
- Asmore Road (State Route 24); Salerno Street (State Route 24)
- South end: Bermuda Street (State Route 3)

Location(s)
- Major suburbs: Bundall

Bundall Road is a road from Bundall to Southport on the Gold Coast in Queensland, Australia. Originally a suburban street, it is now part of Southport–Burleigh Road, a state controlled road (State Route 3)

Bundall Road is a continuation of Bermuda Street north for about 1.9 km to the intersection with Slatyer Avenue / Thomas Drive, where it becomes Ferry Road. Not all maps agree on the precise point at which the name changes from Bermuda Street to Bundall Road, but the most commonly accepted is at the intersection with Boomerang Crescent, about 300 metres south of the intersection of Bundall Road with Ashmore Road.

== Major intersections ==
- Crombie Avenue
- Ashmore Road (west) / Salerno Street (east) (State Route 24)
