= Varsity Lakes =

- Suburb
- Interactive map of Varsity Lakes
- Coordinates: 28°05′17″S 153°24′35″E
- Country: Australia
- State: Queensland
- City: Gold Coast
- LGA: City of Gold Coast
- Location: 13.0 km (8.1 mi) S of Surfers Paradise; 15.4 km (9.6 mi) S of Southport; 86.6 km (53.8 mi) SSE of Brisbane CBD; 21.1 km (13.1 mi) NW of Tweed Heads
- Established: 2002

Government
  - State electorates: Burleigh; Mermaid Beach
  - Federal division: McPherson

Area
  - Total: 5.9 km^{2} (2.3 sq mi)
- Elevation: 5 m (16 ft)

Population
  - Total: 16,493 (2021 census)
  - Density: 2,795/km^{2} (7,240/sq mi)
- Time zone: UTC+10:00 (AEST)
- Postcode: 4227
Suburbs around Varsity Lakes
Robina	Robina	Miami
Mudgeeraba	Varsity Lakes	Burleigh Waters
Reedy Creek	Burleigh Heads	Burleigh Heads

Varsity Lakes is a suburb in the City of Gold Coast, Queensland, Australia. In the 2021 census, Varsity Lakes had a population of 16,493 people.

The suburb was originally known as Stephens but in 2002 Stephens, Andrews and a section of Robina were amalgamated to form the new suburb of Varsity Lakes.

== Geography ==
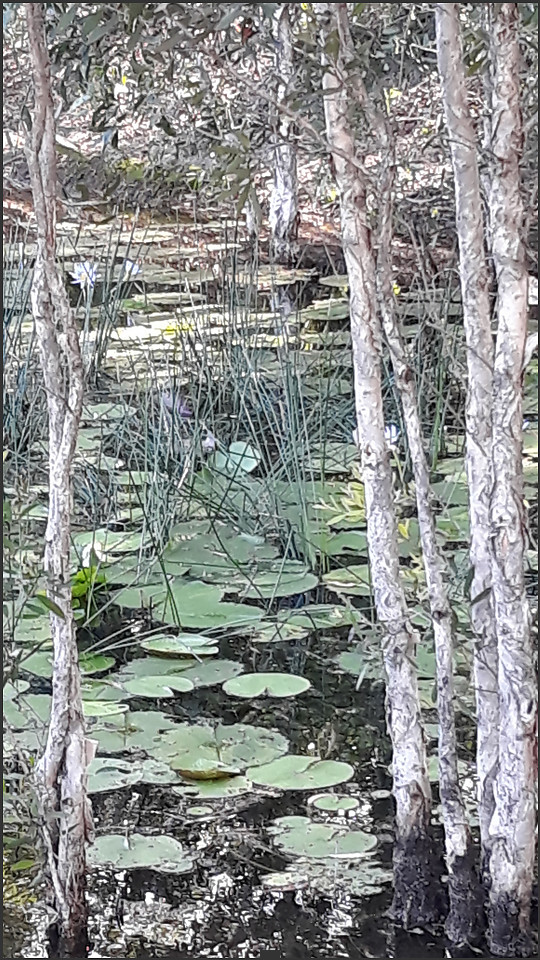
Melaleucas, Varsity Lakes Wetlands Reserve, 2022

The suburb is bounded to the west by the Pacific Motorway, to the south by Reedy Creek Road, and to the east by Mattocks Road and Bermuda Street.

The Gold Coast railway line enters the suburb from the north-west (Robina) and runs immediately parallel and east of the motorway where the line terminates at Varsity Lakes railway station (28.0971°S 153.3993°E).

== History ==
In 1873, former Mayor of Brisbane Thomas Blacket Stephens purchased 6980 acres of swampy Gold Coast hinterland and began to drain the swamp to develop dairying naming his first dairy Hill View. His son William Stephens continued the drainage work and established the dairy Merrimac.

In 1981, a southern section of the estate was officially named Stephens in 1981 in honour of Thomas Blacket Stephens.

In 1999, the area between Stephens and Robina was purchased by Delfin Lend Lease and a real estate development known as Varsity Lakes began. Man-made lakes named Lake Orr and Lake Azzura were created and residential development followed.

Varsity College opened on 1 January 2001.

In 2002, the suburbs of Stephens, Andrews and a portion of Robina were amalgamated to create a new suburb named Varsity Lakes after the development.

Arcadia College was a private secondary (7-12) school for boys and girls. In 2015, Arcadia College combined its two campuses at Southport and Palm Beach into a single campus at 1 Bellevue Drive in Varsity Lakes, (28.0795°S 153.4087°E). In 2018, the school had an enrolment of 188 students with 20 teachers (19 full-time equivalent) and 9 non-teaching staff (7 full-time equivalent). In January 2021, the school relocated to 12 Centreline Place, Robina.

== Demographics ==
In the 2011 census, Varsity Lakes had a population of 14,366 people, 52.2% female and 47.8% male. The median age of the Varsity Lakes population was 32 years, 5 years below the national median of 37. 61.1% of people living in Varsity Lakes were born in Australia. The other top responses for country of birth were New Zealand 8.1%, England 4.8%, China 1.8%, South Africa 1.7%, Malaysia 1%. 76.8% of people spoke only English at home; the next most common languages were 2.3% Mandarin, 1.7% Cantonese, 1.1% Japanese, 1% Korean, 0.9% Arabic. The top responses for religious groups in Varsity Lakes by size were; Roman Catholic - 23.4%, Anglican - 16%, Uniting Church - 4.3%, Non-denominational Christian - 3.9%, Presbyterian - 3.1% and Buddhism - 2.3%. Remaining religions make up for less than two percent individually while "no religion" comprised 24.8%.

In the 2016 census, Varsity Lakes had a population of 15,026 people.

In the 2021 census, Varsity Lakes had a population of 16,493 people.

== Education ==
Varsity College is a government primary and secondary (Prep to 12) school for boys and girls. In 2018, the school had an enrolment of 3,269 students with 243 teachers (223 full-time equivalent) and 107 non-teaching staff (80 full-time equivalent). It includes a special education program. The school has two sites:

- the primary school campus at 1 Bridgewater Drive (28.0883°S 153.4101°E)
- the secondary school campus at 198 Varsity Parade (28.0781°S 153.4116°E)

The suburb is also served by two other primary schools: Caningeraba State School in neighbouring Burleigh Waters to the east and Robina State School in neighbouring Robina to the north-west. It is also served by Miami State High School in neighbouring Miami to the north-east.

== Religion ==
Varsity Lakes offers several Christian places of worship. These include:

- Elevation Church
- Glow Church
- Hope Church Australia

== Sporting facilities ==
The majority of sporting facilities in Varsity Lakes are present in both the primary and secondary school campuses.

In 2008 the Varsity Lakes Skate Park (officially known as Janette Green Park) underwent a $1 million revamp. On 17 March 2009 skating legend Tony Hawk visited the skate park and commented "We just go wherever the skate parks are and you've got a great skate park here."

Central Park offers undercover gym facilities, a grass oval with Australian rules football posts and basketball courts. In December 2017 an undercover outdoor gym was opened at Central Park which includes a basketball court fitted with lights allowing for nighttime use.

The Varsity Lakes Community Centre regularly hosts sporting group activities; including aerobics, fitness, walking and table tennis.

== Public transport ==
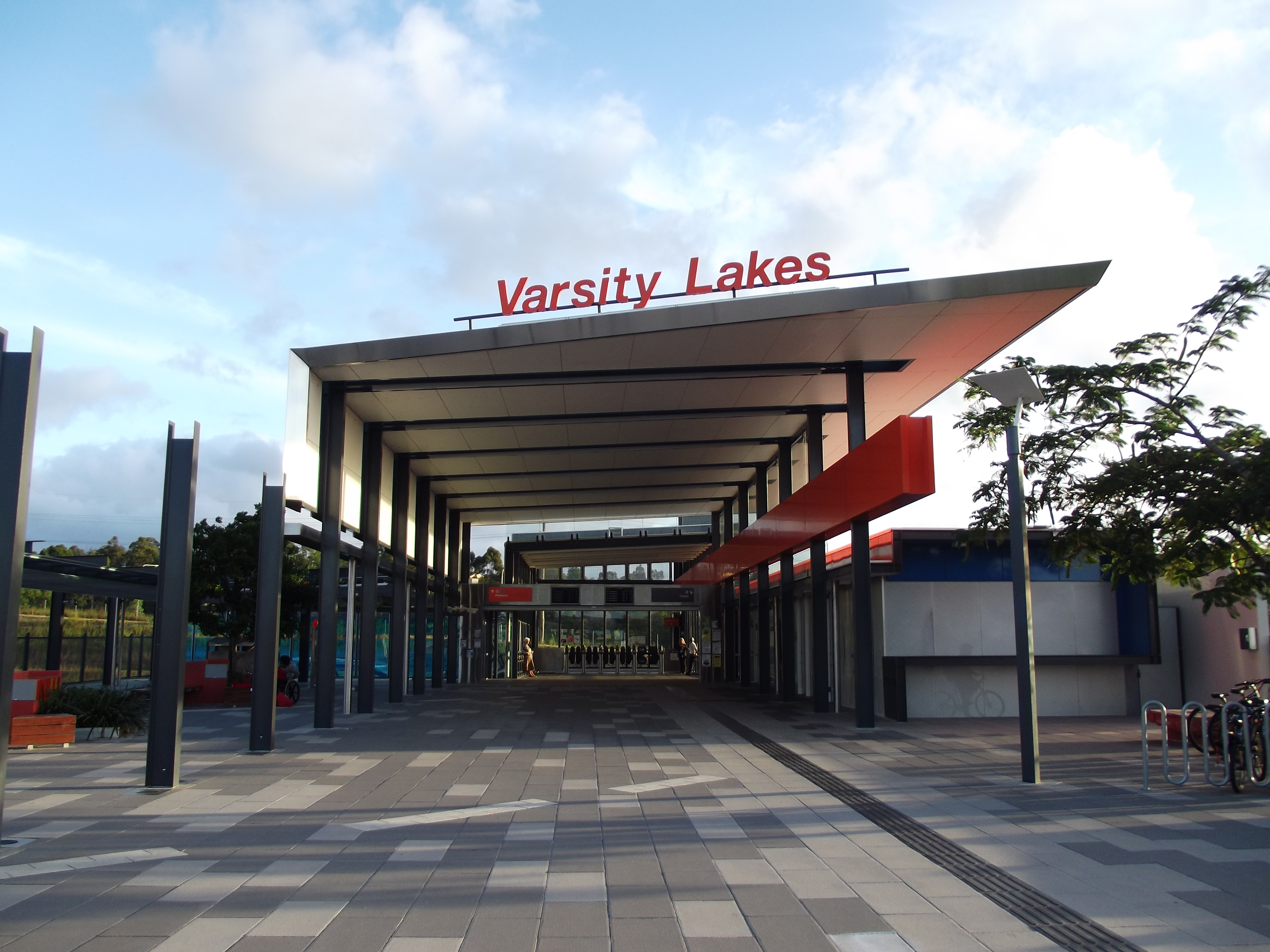
Varsity Lakes railway station

Kinetic Gold Coast operate a number of bus services though the suburb that connect Varsity Lakes to Robina, Broadbeach and Tweed Heads. Queensland Rail operates a line that runs from Central railway station, Brisbane through to the Gold Coast, terminating at Varsity Lakes.
