= Ferry Road, Gold Coast =

Road in Southport, Queensland, Australia

Ferry Road Queensland
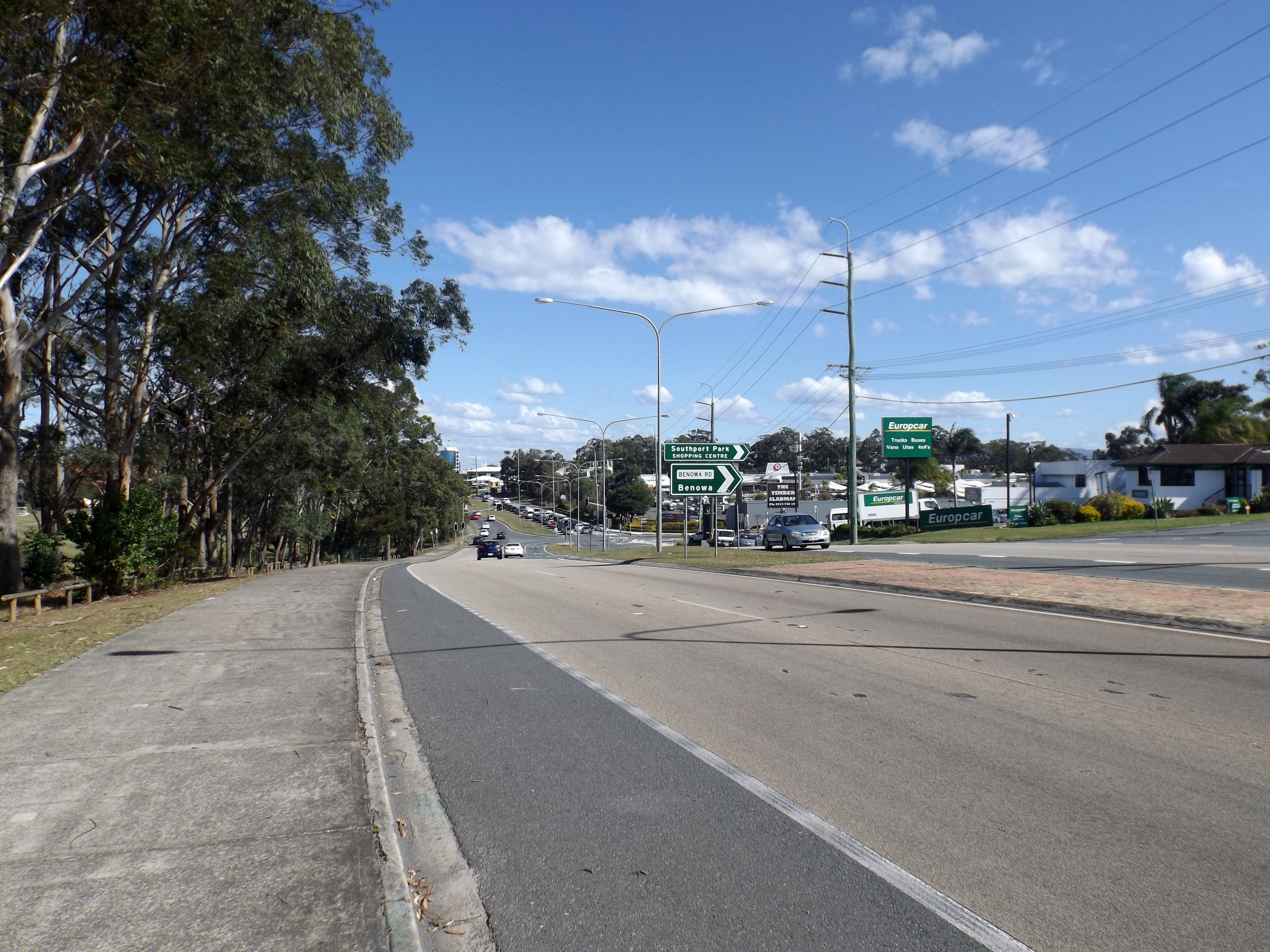
- Southport, 2015

General information
- Type: Road
- Length: 2.9 km (1.8 mi)
- Route number(s): State Route 3

Major junctions
- North end: High Street (State Route 3)
- Queen Street (State Route 20)
- South end: Bundall Road (State Route 3)

Ferry Road is a road in Southport, on the Gold Coast, Queensland, Australia. Originally a suburban street, it is now part of Southport–Burleigh Road, a state controlled road (State Route 3)

== Geography ==
Ferry Road is a continuation of High Street, Southport. It runs for about 2.9 kilometres (1.8 mi) to the intersection with Slatyer Avenue and Thomas Drive, from where it continues as Bundall Road. There are no major intersections on this road.

== History ==
In 1887, German immigrant Johann Meyer operated a ferry across the Nerang River. From Southport, travellers would follow the Meyer's Ferry Road (now simply Ferry Road) to a spit of land that created a narrow point in the river (28.0011°S 153.4247°E). The narrow spit is no longer in existence due to changes in the river and the creation of Chevron Island but is in the vicinity of the Gold Coast Arts Centre. From that point, Meyer's ferry would take the travellers across the river to Meyer's Ferry Road at Elston (as Surfers Paradise was then known) along which the travellers would walk to the surf beach. Businesses established along Meyer's Ferry Road at Elston which created the main street of Surfers Paradise now known as Cavill Avenue. Although the surf beaches of Elston were a popular destination, the lack of road access limited the extent of residential and commercial development. It was not until 1925 that the Jubilee Bridge was built between Southport and Main Beach which opened up Surfers Paradise for tourism and associated development and eliminated the need for the ferry service.

The present day Ferry Road is only southbound part of the original Ferry Road, the remainder which meandered in an easterly direction to the end of the spit and the ferry service was lost as the river was embanked and islands created.
