= Mount Nimmel =

Mountain in Australia

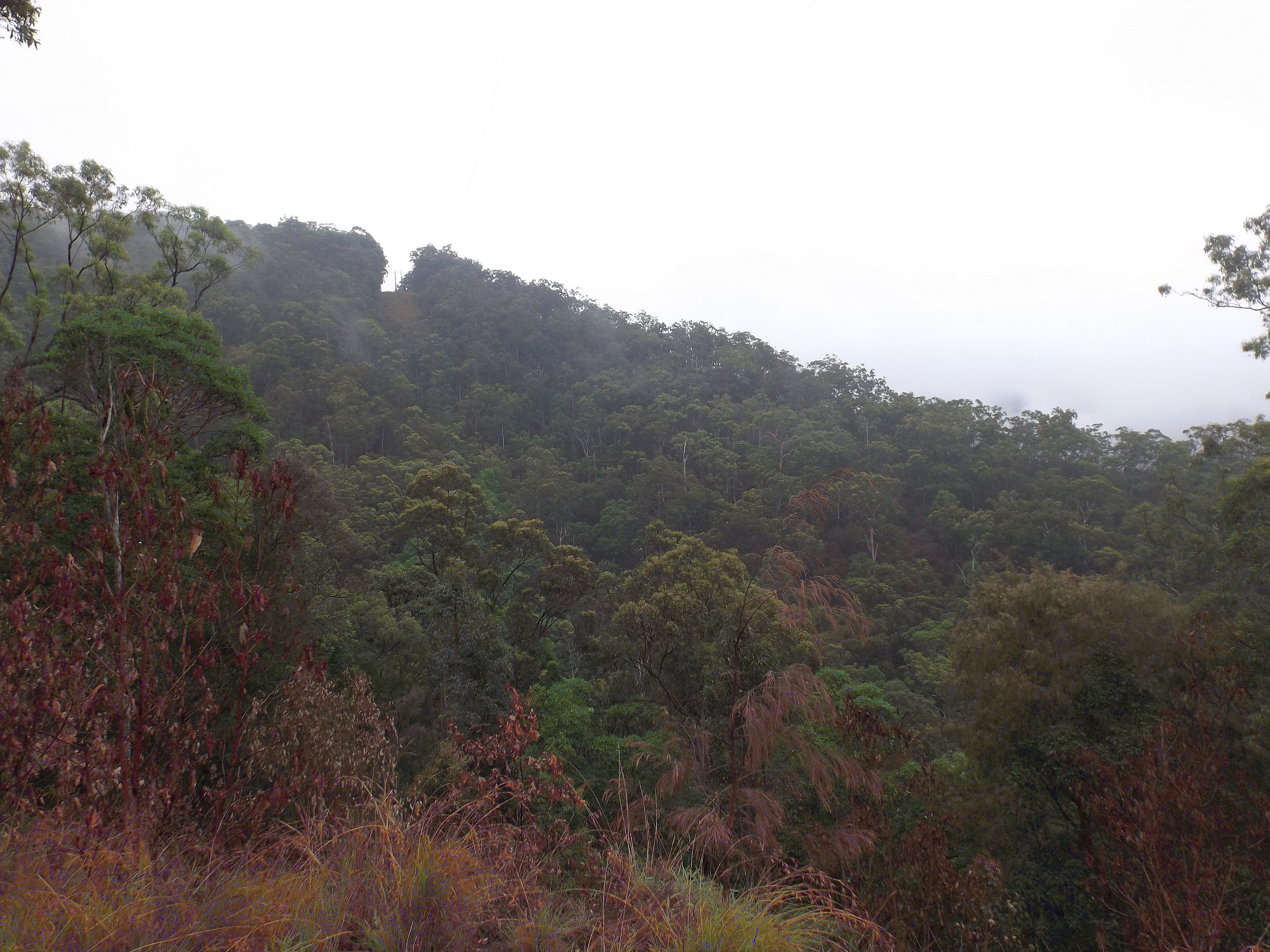
- View from Mount Nimmel Road, 2016

Highest point
- Elevation: 489 m (1,604 ft)
- Coordinates: 28°09′S 153°18′E

Geography
- Location within Queensland
- Location: Queensland, Australia
- Parent range: Nimmel Range

Mount Nimmel is a small mountain located in Springbrook, part of the Gold Coast hinterland of South East Queensland, Australia. Nimmel is an Australian indigenous word meaning 'Conspicuous Mountain', which is ironic, considering it is very small when compared to the nearby Springbrook Mountain, Tamborine Mountain and Mount Cougal's twin peaks. The peak is protected within Springbrook National Park.

== Events ==
Every year the Kokoda Challenge Gold Coast ascends Mount Nimmel as one leg of the walking challenge.

== See also ==
- List of mountains in Australia
