= Gooding Drive =

Gooding Drive Queensland

General information
- Type: Road
- Length: 3.8 km (2.4 mi)
- Route number(s): State Route 50

Major junctions
- West end: Hinkler Drive, Worongary
- Pacific Motorway (M1)
- East end: Nerang–Broadbeach Road State Route 90, Carrara

Location(s)
- Major suburbs: Merrimac

Gooding Drive (state route 50) is a major road on the Gold Coast, Queensland. The road begins at the intersection of Hinkler Drive in Worongary where it passes over the Pacific Motorway and runs through the suburb of Merrimac before terminating in Carrara where it joins up with Nerang–Broadbeach Road (state route 90). As part of the most direct route from the Gold Coast Highway at Broadbeach to the Pacific Motorway it is a key component of Gold Coast infrastructure.

== History ==
The road was probably named for the Gooding family, who ran a dairy farm in the area for many years.

Braeside, a home built early in the twentieth century, is on Gooding Drive. It now functions as a wedding and funeral centre.

== Major intersections ==
The road is in the City of Gold Coast local government area.

Location	km	mi	Destinations	Notes
Worongary	0	0.0	Mudgeeraba Road (State Route 50) – south – Mudgeeraba / Hinkler Drive – north – Nerang	Western end of Gooding Drive (State Route 50)
Worongary / Mudgeeraba midpoint	0.1	0.062	Pacific Motorway (M1) – M1 entry ramp – north – Nerang / – M1 exit ramp – from south (Mudgeeraba)	Roundabout
Merrimac	0.25	0.16	Pacific Motorway (M1) – M1 entry ramp – south – Robina / – M1 exit ramp – from north (Nerang)	Roundabout
Merrimac; Clear Island Waters, Carrara tripoint	3.8	2.4	Nerang–Broadbeach Road (State Route 90) – north – Nerang / east – Broadbeach / Robina Parkway (State Route 7) – south – Robina	Roundabout. Eastern end of Gooding Drive
1.000 mi = 1.609 km; 1.000 km = 0.621 mi
