= Burleigh Waters, Queensland =

Burleigh Waters
- Suburb
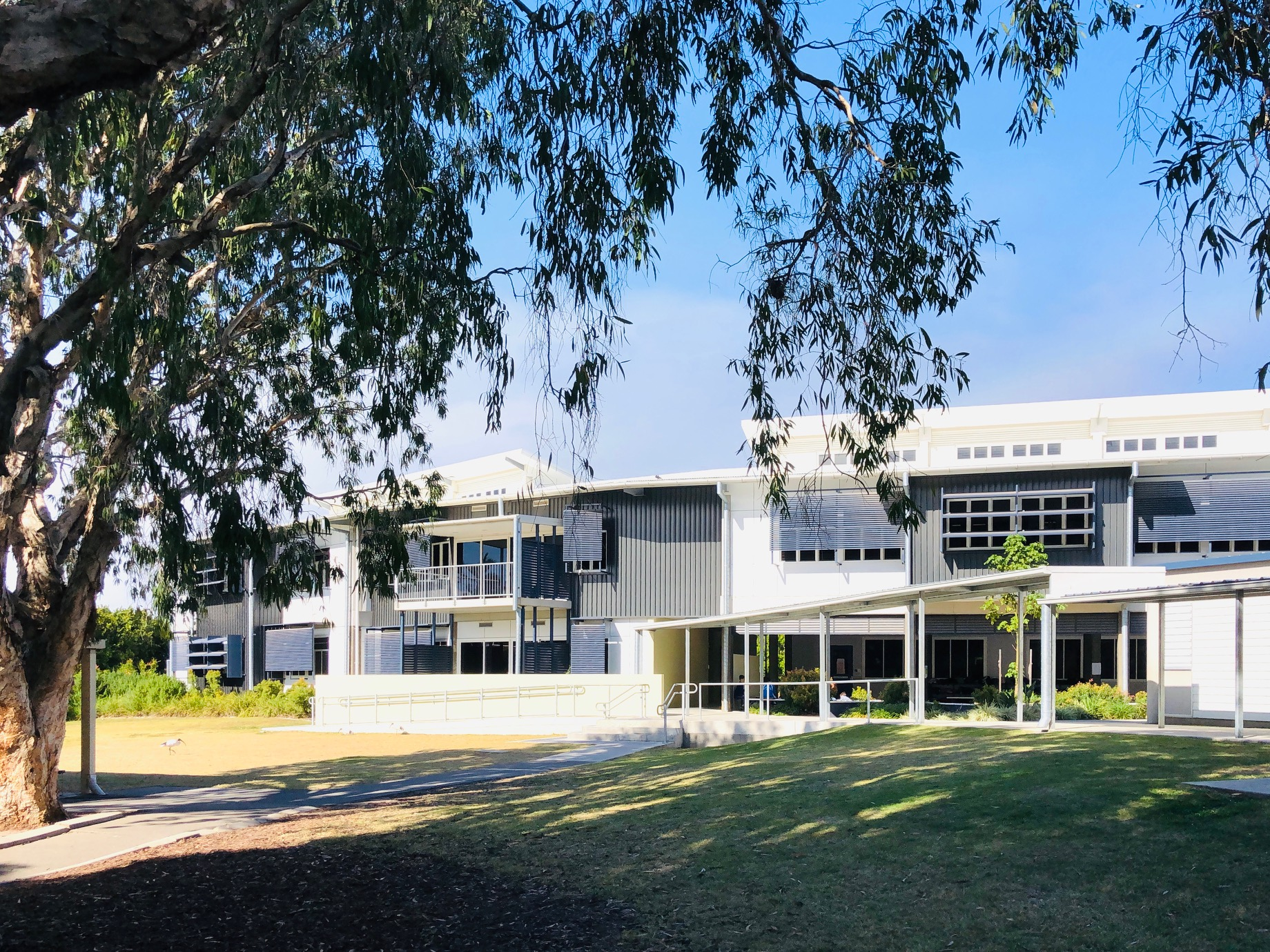
- Caningeraba State School, 2020

- Interactive map of Burleigh Waters
- Coordinates: 28.0875°S 153.4355°E
- Country: Australia
- State: Queensland
- City: Gold Coast
- LGA: City of Gold Coast
- Location: 12.1 km (7.5 mi) S of Surfers Paradise; 14.6 km (9.1 mi) S of Southport; 88.9 km (55.2 mi) SSE of Brisbane CBD; 20 km (12 mi) NW of Tweed Heads

Government
  - State electorates: Burleigh; Mermaid Beach
  - Federal division: McPherson

Area
  - Total: 6.7 km^{2} (2.6 sq mi)
- Elevation: 4 m (13 ft)

Population
  - Total: 14,556 (2021 census)
  - Density: 2,173/km^{2} (5,630/sq mi)
- Time zone: UTC+10:00 (AEST)
- Postcode: 4220
Suburbs around Burleigh Waters
Robina	Mermaid Waters	Miami
Varsity Lakes	Burleigh Waters	Burleigh Heads
Burleigh Heads	Burleigh Heads	Burleigh Heads

Burleigh Waters is a suburb in the City of Gold Coast, Queensland, Australia. In the 2021 census, Burleigh Waters had a population of 14,556 people.

== Geography ==
Burleigh Waters lies within the Gold Coast Electorate Division 12 which also includes Burleigh Heads, Burleigh Waters, Andrews, Stephens and Reedy Creek. In south is Marymount College as well as two large shopping centres.

The Gold Coast canal and waterway system network allows access from Burleigh Waters to The Broadwater and the Pacific Ocean. Five lakes have been created and named in Burleigh Waters:

- Lake Heron (28.0798°S 153.4261°E)
- Miami Lake (28.0769°S 153.4366°E)
- Swan Lake (28.0888°S 153.4312°E)
- Pelican Lake (28.0800°S 153.4380°E)
- Burleigh Lake (28.0877°S 153.4408°E)

The canal system is tidal, and during years of heavy rains and flood, homes on the Burleigh Waters canal can face flooding.

Stephens Swamp is a wetland (28.0888°S 153.4286°E).

There is a foot-and-cycle bridge between Dunlin Drive Link Park across Burleigh Lake to Burleigh Lake Park (28.0918°S 153.4372°E).

== History ==
Stephens Swamp occupied much of present-day Burleigh Waters into the 1990s. It was named after Thomas Blacket Stephens, a local landholder who began draining the swamp land in 1861.

In the 1950s, the Isle of Capri was one of the first canal estates constructed on the Gold Coast for waterfront living. Developers have expanded the popular estates ever since. Prior to the eastern inland development of the Varsity Lakes area, Burleigh Waters was the southernmost point of the Gold Coast canal and waterway system. Burleigh Waters developed in stages, starting in the 1970s. One section, Burleigh Waters Estate was a canal extension developed by Hooker Corporation with partner BMD Group during the late 1970s. The Hooker Corporation collapsed and Mr Power's BMD Group was paid out at 60c in the dollar a few years later. Privately built homes were being constructed by the time Pacific Fair opened in 1977 and continued with the expansion of the suburb. As a result of drainage and land reclamation, Stephens Swamp was eventually replaced by a series of man-made lakes that gives the suburb its name.

The suburb of Burleigh Waters was officially named and bounded on 1 June 1981. The name Burleigh is taken from Burleigh Head, originally named Burly Head by surveyor James Warner in 1840.

The Infant Saviour Primary School opened in Burleigh Heads in 1935 and closed in 1973 when it was replaced by Marymount Primary School in Burleigh Waters.

Marymount College opened in 1967.

Caningeraba State School opened on 27 January 1987 with 130 students. It was built to relieve the pressure of increasing student numbers at Burleigh Heads State School.

The Burleigh Waters Library opened in 1991.

For decades a local urban myth maintained that sharks were seen as far south in the canal waterways as Burleigh Waters. Alleged sightings and stories were locally spread, but balanced with scepticism. In February 2003, a Burleigh Waters man was fatally attacked in shallow canal waters by a bull whaler shark. These sharks are also known as Zambezi whaler and are very aggressive. After the attack, the public was warned not to risk swimming in any Gold Coast canals but rather to swim safely at the beach, between the flags.

== Demographics ==
At the 2011 census, Burleigh Waters had a population of 13,868, 52.3% female and 47.7% male. The median age of the Burleigh Waters population was 40 years, 3 years above the national median of 37. 71.8% of people living in Burleigh Waters were born in Australia. The other top responses for country of birth were New Zealand 7.4%, England 5.5%, Scotland 0.9%, South Africa 0.6%, Germany 0.6%. 88.6% of people spoke only English at home; the next most common languages were 0.6% Japanese, 0.6% Spanish, 0.5% German, 0.5% Cantonese, 0.5% Italian.

In the 2016 census, Burleigh Waters had a population of 14,310 people.

In the 2021 census, Burleigh Waters had a population of 14,556 people.

== Education ==
Caningeraba State School is a government primary (Prep-6) school for boys and girls on Whistler Drive (28.0853°S 153.4302°E). In 2018, the school had an enrolment of 1112 students with 77 teachers (68 full-time equivalent) and 37 non-teaching staff (23 full-time equivalent). It includes a special education program.

Marymount Primary School is a Catholic primary (Prep-6) school for boys and girls at 261-283 Reedy Creek Road (28.1010°S 153.4294°E). In 2018, the school had an enrolment of 998 students with 59 teachers (51 full-time equivalent) and 38 non-teaching staff (25 full-time equivalent).

Marymount College is a Catholic secondary (7–12) school for boys and girls at 261-283 Reedy Creek Road (28.1015°S 153.4304°E). In 2018, the school had an enrolment of 1,225 students with 98 teachers (93 full-time equivalent) and 52 non-teaching staff (39 full-time equivalent).

There is no government secondary school in Burleigh Waters. The nearest government secondary schools are Miami State High School in neighbouring Miami to the north-east and Varsity College in neighbouring Varsity Lakes to the west.

== Amenities ==
The Gold Coast City Council operates a public library on the northern corner of Christine Avenue and Galeen Drive (28.0814°S 153.4321°E).

Burleigh Town Post Office is in the Stockland Burleigh Heads shopping centre on Reedy Creek Road (28.0977°S 153.4410°E). Burleigh Post Shop is at 6 Classic Way (28.0995°S 153.4240°E).

Mary Mother of Mercy Catholic Church is at 3 Sunlight Drive (28.1009°S 153.4328°E). It is part of the Burleigh Heads Catholic Parish within the Archdiocese of Brisbane.
