= Nerang–Broadbeach Road =

Road in Queensland, Australia

Nerang–Broadbeach Road Queensland

General information
- Type: Road
- Length: 11.5 km (7.1 mi)
- Route number(s): State Route 90

Major junctions
- West end: Pacific Motorway (M1), Nerang
- Ross Street (State Route 4); Nielsens Road; Gooding Drive (State Route 50); Robina Parkway (State Route 7); Bermuda Street (State Route 3)
- East end: Gold Coast Highway (State Route 2), Broadbeach

Location(s)
- Major suburbs: Carrara, Broadbeach Waters

Nerang–Broadbeach Road is a road on the Gold Coast, Queensland, Australia. It is classified a state-controlled district road, and is part of State Route 90. The eastern section is also known as Hooker Boulevard.

It is a state-controlled district road (number 105).

== Route description ==
From a grade-separated interchange with the Pacific Motorway in Nerang, Nerang–Broadbeach Road heads south-east through Carrara, parallel to the Nerang River. After seven kilometres (4.3 mi), the western section of the road ends at a roundabout with Gooding Drive and Robina Parkway, near the Carrara Markets. Gooding Drive connects to the eastern part of Nerang–Broadbeach Road, which is also known as Hooker Boulevard. This section continues through to Gold Coast Highway in Broadbeach, Queensland, over a distance of 3.6 kilometres (2.2 mi). Most of the road is a divided four to six-lane carriageway, apart from one short section in Nerang which is two-lane.

== History ==
An interchange with the Pacific Motorway opened on 29 November 1999, designed to reduce congestion and facilitate the upgrading of the then Pacific Highway to freeway standards, for an expected 60,000 vehicles per day. The $52 million interchange was predominantly funded by the Commonwealth government, as part of the Pacific Highway upgrade between Brisbane and Newcastle.

Widening the road to a four-lane dual carriageway, between Garden Grove and Goodings Corner, was undertaken a few years later. The public were consulted about the upgrade during the planning stage in 1998. The first stage of the project involved a new traffic light intersection at an extended Nielsens Road, which was completed by December 2001. The second phase, completed one year later, deviated Nerang–Broadbeach Road to meet Gooding Drive at the Robina Parkway roundabout, with the previous alignment becoming a local road with on-street parking. The third section of work, at Ross Street, upgraded the intersection and duplicated the Ross Street Bridge. It commenced in September 2002, and continued through to 2003.

=== Commonwealth Games ===
In November 2011, the Gold Coast won the hosting rights for the 2018 Commonwealth Games, but locals were concerned about traffic infrastructure and congestion. This included along Nerang–Broadbeach Road to the Gooding Drive roundabout. Diverting buses through residential streets was considered as part of improvements for Nerang–Broadbeach Road, which was opposed by 396 people in a petition tabled in parliament by Mermaid Beach MP Ray Stevens. In December 2011 it was revealed that public transport projects would be brought forward in time for the games, including an expanded light rail network and bus lanes along Nerang–Broadbeach Road. By April 2012, a new shared path for bicycles and pedestrians had been constructed from west of Alaska Avenue to Bermuda Street, and cycle lanes had been marked for the section between Riverview Road and Lawrence Drive. Future projects were also planned for, to provide further cycle lanes as well as bus priority measures along various sections of the road. In April 2013, a further $18 million worth of works were planned for, including $10 million for works beyond 2015. In October 2013, Member for Gaven Dr Alex Douglas countered public speculation by revealing that the government would not "widen Nerang–Broadbeach Road near the Pacific Motorway, despite the additional traffic expected from the Commonwealth Games, but would prepare and release a Transport Strategic Plan. As of 2014, future improvement works on the road are still planned, to be designed and constructed when funding is available.

== Major intersections ==
The entire road is in the City of Gold Coast local government area.

Location	km	mi	Destinations	Notes
Nerang	0	0.0	Pacific Motorway (State Route M1) – north – Gaven / south – Worongary and Carrara / Nerang Connection Road (State Route 90) – north–west – Nerang	Western end of Nerang–Broadbeach Road (State Route 90)
Carrara	3.6	2.2	Birmingham Road – north–east – Benowa; Birmingham Road – south – Carrara	
Carrara	6.1	3.8	Nielsens Road – north–west – Carrara and Pacific Motorway	
Carrara, Merrimac, Clear Island Waters border	7.0	4.3	Gooding Drive (State Route 50) – south–west – Merrimac / Robina Parkway (State Route 7) – south – Robina	The road continues east as Gooding Drive for 0.5 km and then reverts to Nerang–Broadbeach Road
Clear Island Waters, Mermaid Waters, Broadbeach Waters border	9.3	5.8	Bermuda Street (State Route 3) – north – Broadbeach Waters / south – Robina	The road continues east as Hooker Boulevard
Broadbeach	11.5	7.1	Gold Coast Highway (State Route 2) – north – Surfers Paradise / south – Mermaid Beach	Eastern end of Nerang–Broadbeach Road
1.000 mi = 1.609 km; 1.000 km = 0.621 mi: Route transition

== See also ==
- List of numbered roads in Queensland
