= Springbrook, Queensland =

Springbrook
- Town
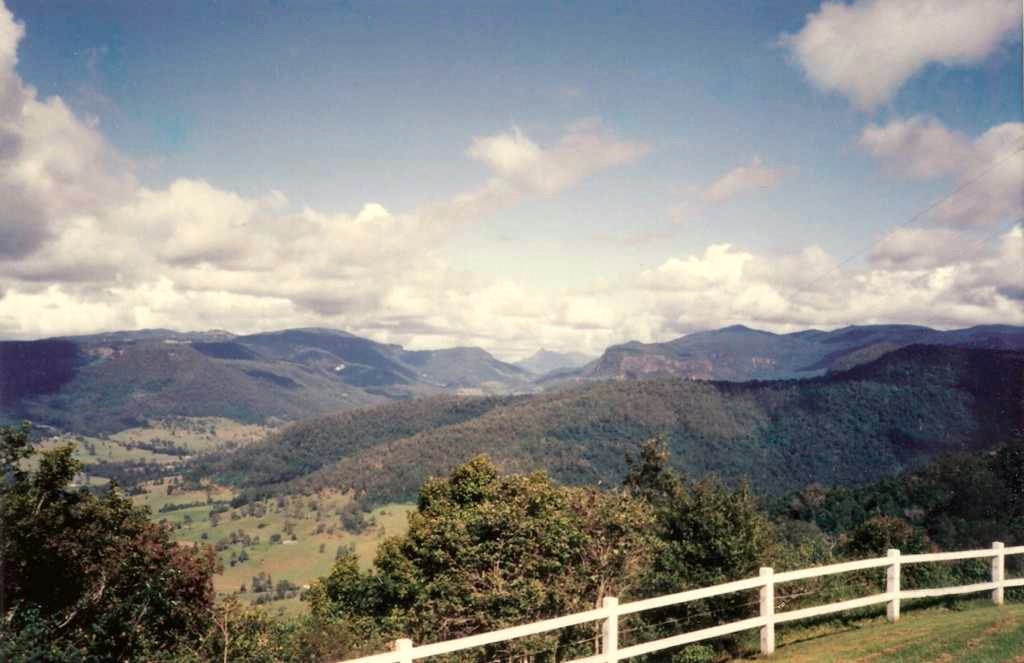
- Springbrook Plateau (left of image)

- Interactive map of Springbrook
- Coordinates: 28.1838°S 153.2588°E
- Country: Australia
- State: Queensland
- City: Gold Coast
- LGA: City of Gold Coast
- Location: 36.2 km (22.5 mi) SW of Surfers Paradise; 40.5 km (25.2 mi) SW of Southport; 102 km (63 mi) S of Brisbane
- Established: 1906

Government
  - State electorate: Mudgeeraba
  - Federal division: McPherson

Area
  - Total: 52.7 km^{2} (20.3 sq mi)

Population
  - Total: 705 (2021 census)
  - Density: 13.378/km^{2} (34.65/sq mi)
- Time zone: UTC+10:00 (AEST)
- Postcode: 4213
Localities around Springbrook
Numinbah Valley	Neranwood	Austinville
Numinbah Valley	Springbrook	Austinville
Natural Bridge	Numinbah (NSW)	Tallebudgera Valley

Springbrook is a rural town and locality in the City of Gold Coast, Queensland, Australia. The locality borders New South Wales.

In the 2021 census, the locality of Springbrook had a population of 705.

== Geography ==
The plateau is covered in subtropical rainforest and crossed by many small creeks. The area has excellent views to the Gold Coast and is known for its cliffs, waterfalls and forest walks, most of which are protected in the Springbrook National Park.

Road access to this eastern Scenic Rim mountain is via Mudgeeraba along the Springbrook Road and from Numinbah Valley via Pine Creek Road. To the south of Springbrook is the Tweed Range, west is the Numinbah Valley and the Lamington Plateau. Both the Nimmel Range and Tamborine Mountain are to the north, as is Hinze Dam while the peak of Mount Nimmel is at the north eastern tip. The plateau is part of a biodiversity hot spot. It is part of the Scenic Rim Important Birdlife Area. Pademelons are commonly seen by visitors.

Springbrook Plateau is the remains of the Tweed Volcano—now known as Mount Warning and the Tweed Valley. The plateau is an undulating elevated patch that extends north from the southern, forested heights, close to Mount Cougal, just to the east. These subtropical rainforests are part of the Gondwana Rainforests of Australia and contain the rare Antarctic beech trees. Springbrook plateau has been described as "the Switzerland of Queensland" and a unique wonder. Springbrook was widely considered to be part of the McPherson Range. As the area's geology was understood it has now come to be typically described as a distinct plateau landform.

The plateau is highly visible on the western horizon from the Gold Coast coastal strip. Springbrook Plateau is in the water catchment area for Tallebudgera Creek and the larger Nerang River dammed by the Hinze Dam, a significant part of the region's water supply infrastructure. Little Nerang Creek flows into [[Little Nerang Dam|Little Nerang Dam (28.1477°S 153.2841°E)]] in the north of the locality. The Natural Bridge is a rock arch and waterfall on the western slopes of the plateau. A triangulation station is located close to Mount Thillinmam at Bilbrough Lookout. Mobile reception is generally poor at Springbrook.

=== Mountains ===
The locality of Springbrook contains the following mountains, passes, and gorges, from north to south:

- Mount Wunburra (28.1424°S 153.2671°E) 571 metres (1,873 ft)
- Mount Nimmel (28.1461°S 153.2948°E) 460 metres (1,510 ft)
- Salmons Saddle, a mountain pass (28.1527°S 153.2675°E)
- Fairview Mountain (28.1888°S 153.2993°E) 408 metres (1,339 ft)
- The Pinnacle (28.2030°S 153.2964°E) 624 metres (2,047 ft)
- The Canyon, a gorge (28.2179°S 153.2777°E)
- Mount Thillinmam (28.2343°S 153.2901°E) 958 metres (3,143 ft)
- Springbrook Mountain (28.2339°S 153.2784°E) 948 metres (3,110 ft)
- Mount Mumdjin (28.2404°S 153.2666°E) 1,021 metres (3,350 ft)

=== Water features ===
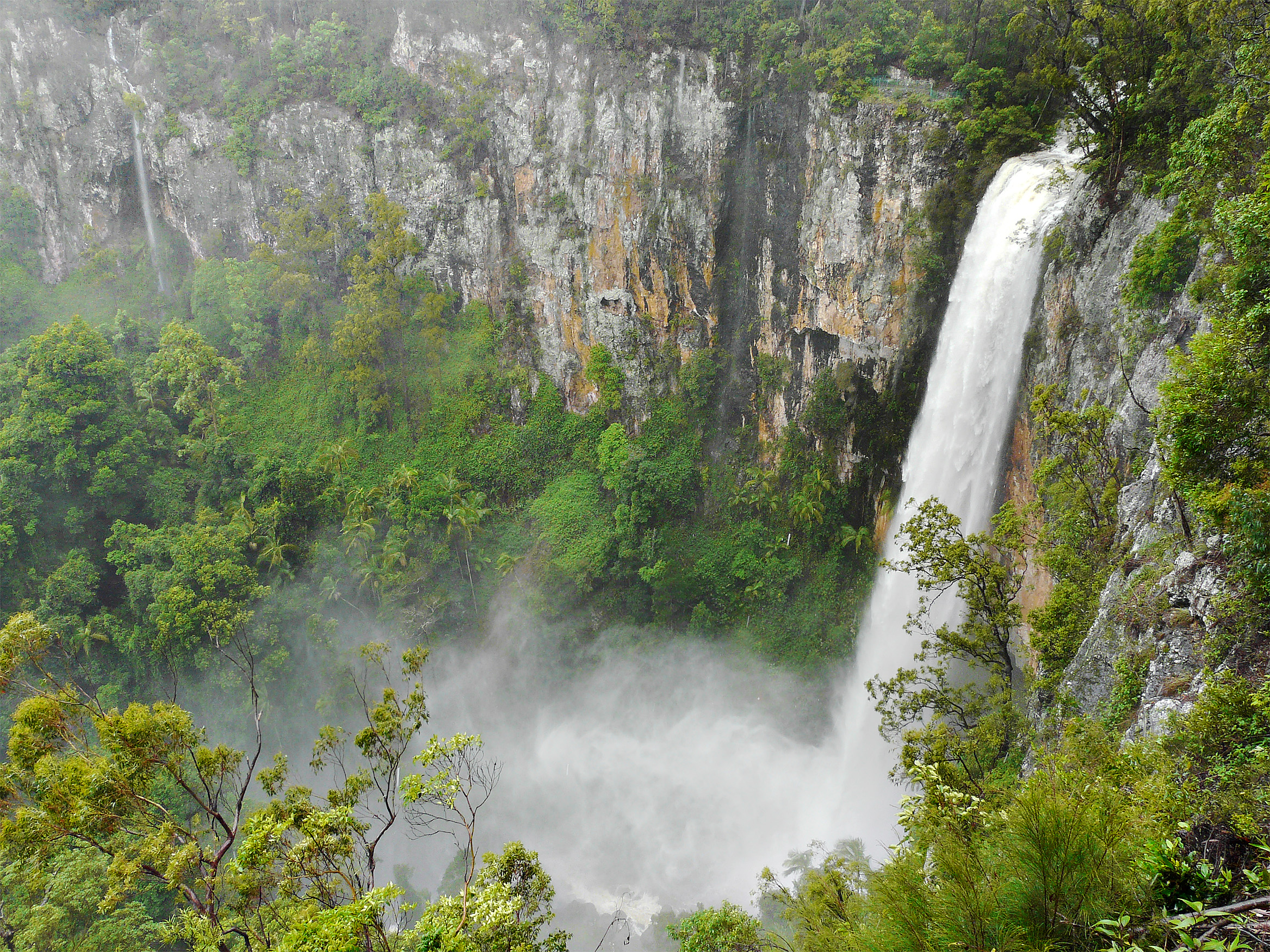
Purlingbrook Falls

The mountainous terrain gives rise to many waterfalls and other water features, including, from north to south:

- Horseshoe Falls (28.1798°S 153.2517°E)
- Tinninaba Falls, also known as Taninaba Falls and Rankins Falls (28.1875°S 153.2669°E)
- Purling Brook Falls (28.1897°S 153.2708°E)
- Hell Hole, a waterhole (28.2040°S 153.3024°E)
- Gooroolba Falls (28.2122°S 153.2819°E)
- Poonyahra Falls (28.2137°S 153.2733°E)
- Poondahra Falls (28.2138°S 153.2727°E)
- Blackfellow Falls (28.2140°S 153.2722°E)
- Ngarri-Dhum Falls (28.2178°S 153.2884°E)
- Kadjagooma Falls (28.2217°S 153.2846°E).
- Bijungoolahra Falls (28.2220°S 153.2846°E)
- Boojerahla Falls (28.2223°S 153.2847°E)
- Reads Falls, also known as Talangagong Falls (28.2226°S 153.2775°E)
- Boojerooma Falls (28.2227°S 153.2747°E)
- Bilbrough Falls, also known as Goomoolahra Falls (28.2232°S 153.2849°E)
- Rush Creek Falls, also known as Tallanbana Falls (28.2236°S 153.2734°E)
- Tamarramai Falls (28.2237°S 153.2758°E)
- Twin Falls (28.2245°S 153.2741°E)

== Climate ==
Due to its close proximity to the coast, the high elevations and subtropical latitude, Springbrook has a wet climate with mild temperatures. Rainfall at the now closed Upper Springbrook BOM rainfall station averaged 3,109 millimetres (122.4 in) annually over 90 years. Springbrook is the only place in subtropical Australia to exceed 3,000 millimetres (120 in) average rainfall making it probably the wettest place between Townsville and Tasmania.

Exceptionally rainy periods have been recorded in some wet years including; 900 millimetres (35 in) of rainfall recorded in a 24-hour period before an unnamed cyclone crossed the coast at Coolangatta on 20 February 1954.

During a remarkable rainy period, Springbrook received 1,631 millimetres (64.2 in) in the month of June 1967. In January 2013, 1,453 millimetres (57.2 in) of rain fell over a period of just 4 days, due to the remnants of Tropical Cyclone Oswald. In March 2017, 1,407 millimetres (55.4 in) of rain fell in part due to Cyclone Debbie, 789 millimetres (31.1 in) of which was recorded at Upper Springbrook on 31 March 2017, causing enough damage to cut off the two access routes into Springbrook and leaving many residents without electricity.

== Flora and Fauna ==
Springbrook has a rich biodiversity that is among the highest diversity of flora, fauna and fungi in Subtropical Australia. Habitat types include Montane Sclerophyll Forests dominated by temperate eucalyptus trees such as New England blackbutt (Eucalyptus campanulata) and Blue Mountain Ash (Eucalyptus oreades) both of which are near their Northern limit of distribution. Rocky outcrops and cliffs support Montane Heath shrublands dominated by Tea Trees Leptospermum variable and L. petersonii, Mountain Bottlebrush Melaleuca montana and Cliff Bottlebrush M. comboynensis. The Giant Rosette Plant Doryanthes palmeri is present on cliffs. Many threatened and endemic flora species are present notably the Endangered Springbrook Leatherwood Eucryphia jinksii which is endemic to the region and otherwise only found within the nearby Numinbah Nature Reserve in northern New South Wales.

Four main types of Rainforest occur on Springbrook; Dry Rainforest, Subtropical Rainforest, Warm Temperate Rainforest and small patches of Cool Temperate Rainforest on the highest peaks. The dominance and diversity of trees varies between rainforest types. Dry rainforest occurs in small patches on the Northern and Western sections of Springbrook and features hoop pine Araucaria cunninghamii, Cinnamon Myrtle Backhousia myrtifolia, Yellow Tulip Drypetes deplanchei and Lace Bark Brachychiton discolor. Subtropical rainforest favors the rich red basaltic soils of the main plateau over 100 tree species can be present however, signature species of this type include white booyong Argyrodendron trifoliolatum, black booyong Argyrodendron actinophyllum, Strangler Figs Ficus spp. and giant stinging tree Dendrocnide excelsa. Much of this forest type was cleared for agriculture in the early 20th century.

Warm Temperate Rainforest grows on low fertility soils derived from Rhyolite and has fewer tree species than subtropical types. Dominant trees of the warm temperate rainforest include coachwood Ceratopetalum apetalum, Callicoma Callicoma serratifolia and occasionally Springbrook Leatherwood Eucryphia jinksii. Cool Temperate Rainforest is restricted to a single area above 1000m altitude near the Best of All Lookout. This forest type features Antarctic beech Nothofagus moorei trees are likely to be thousands of years old and are covered in mosses, orchids and filmy ferns which thrive in the moist cloudy micro-climate. The highest altitude rainforests on Springbrook meet the definition of Subtropical Montane Cloud Forests.

The Springbrook plateau is very rich in native animals including; marsupials, frogs, birds, lizards, snakes and invertebrates such as Spiny Freshwater Crayfish. Paddymelon Wallabies are among the most commonly sighted marsupials but Bettongs, Bandicoots, Swamp Wallabies are also common ground dwelling mammals. Arboreal mammals include mountain brushtail and ring tailed possums and the rare Eastern Pygmy Possum has also been recorded. Frogs include the threatened Fleay's Barred Frog Mixophyes fleayi, Marsupial Frog Assa darlingtonii and Mountain Frog Philoria loveridgei. Birds are abundant and diverse, the most noteworthy being perhaps Albert's Lyrebird and a true bird of paradise the Paradise Riflebird. Three species of Bowerbird are present being the Satin, Regent and Green Catbird.

Reptiles include the border leaf tailed gecko (Saltuarius swainii) The land mullet skink, Stephen's banded snake, eastern tiger snake, carpet python, red-bellied black snake.

Invertebrates include the Lamington Spiny Crayfish Euastacus sulcatus and the Smaller Springbrook Crayfish Euastacus maidae. A new species of Phasmid Stick Insect was recently discovered at Springbrook and Named Parapodacanthus ailaketoae. Large flightless ground beetles include on the higher Springbrook plateau Nurus perater and at lower elevations at Mt Cougal, Tallebudgera and Natural Bridge Nurus moorei. The striking blue and red Mountain Katydid Acripeza reticulata and Tim Tam Bug Zopherosis georgei that resembles a chocolate biscuit have also been recorded at Springbrook.

== History ==
Springbrook was originally known as the Numinbah Plateau.

The timbered plateau was settled relatively late with both the area's inaccessibility and timber reserve status acting as deterrents. In 1906, the area ceased to be a timber reserve and was opened for agricultural settlement. In the same year the first group of settlers, including James Hardy, arrived from northern New South Wales and referred to the new settlement as Springwood. However it was changed to Springbrook to avoid confusion with mail deliveries to another Springwood located in the Blue Mountains. Following the request of postal officials to change the name to avoid confusion with another location in New South Wales, the area became known as Springbrook.

Dairying was encouraged but the settlers found farming difficult and instead cleared for the land for timber. By the 1930s Springbrook was almost completely cleared of trees.

Springbrook State School opened on 25 April 1911. A memorial to the pioneering settlers of the area was built in 1961 to celebrate 50 years since opening of the Springbrook State School. The school closed in 1971.

Tourism has been the major industry since the 1920s, with many guesthouses opening during this period. A decent road up the mountain was built in the mid 1920s with the first car reaching the settlement in June 1926.

Wunburra State School opened circa 1935 after relocating the then-closed Bonogin Creek State School building. Wunburra State School closed circa 1942.

The first declaration of a national park on the plateau was Warrie National Park in 1937.

By 1947, a community hall had been built.

The post office was closed in 1958.

A new Springbrook State School opened on 23 January 1984 at a new site in a new building.

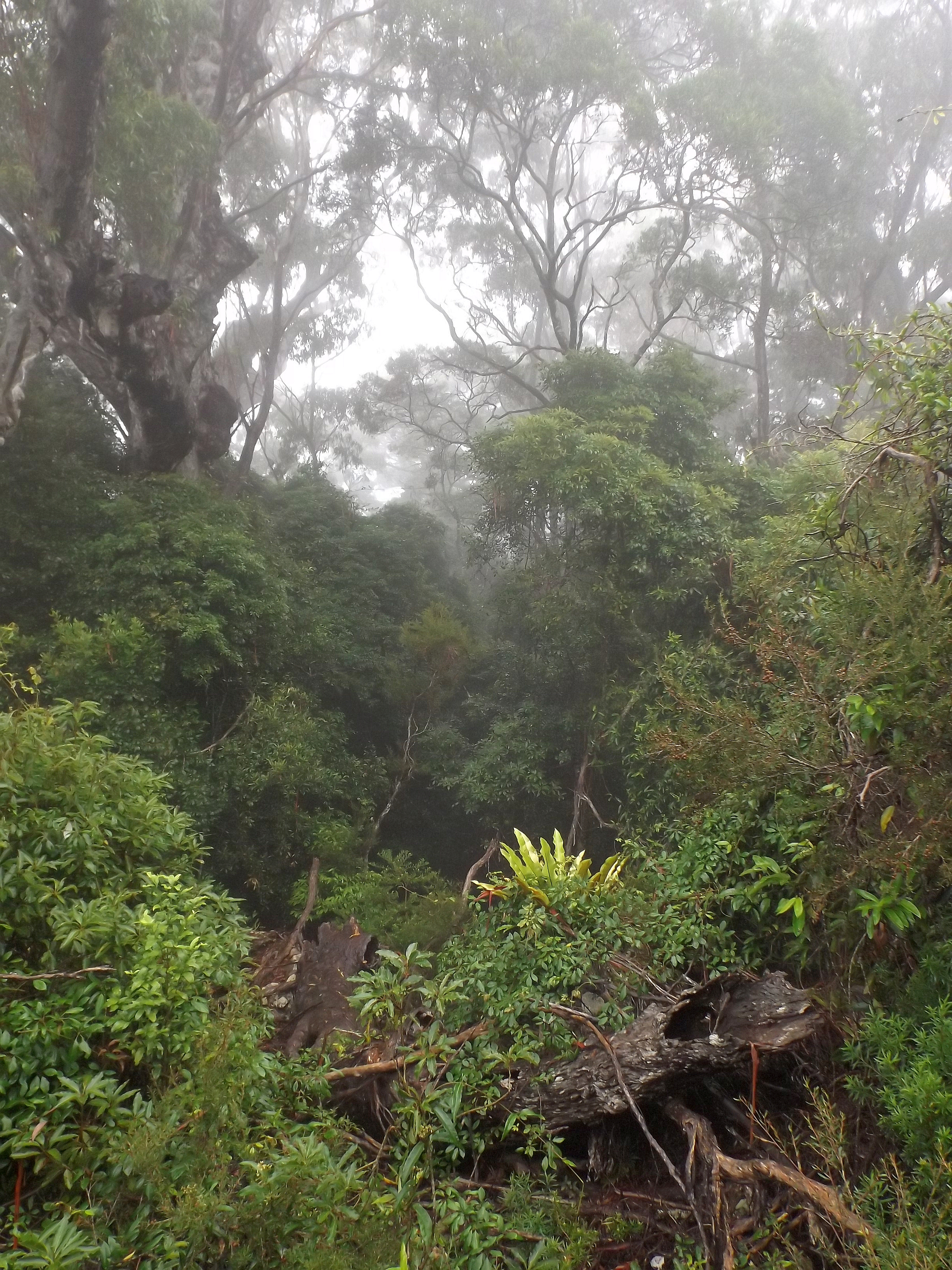
Springbrook National Park rainforest, 2016

Beginning in 2005, the Beattie Government and Bligh Government spent $40.15 million purchasing 45 properties covering 705 hectares (1,740 acres) in Springbrook. The aim is to restore critical habitat to world heritage status and eventually expand the Springbrook National Park. The recovery process is conducted by the Australian Rainforest Conservation Society and led by Aila Keto. The land purchases have been criticised because of a lack of accountability, for pushing up land values and negatively affecting tourism by reducing the number of accommodation places, restaurants and cafes.

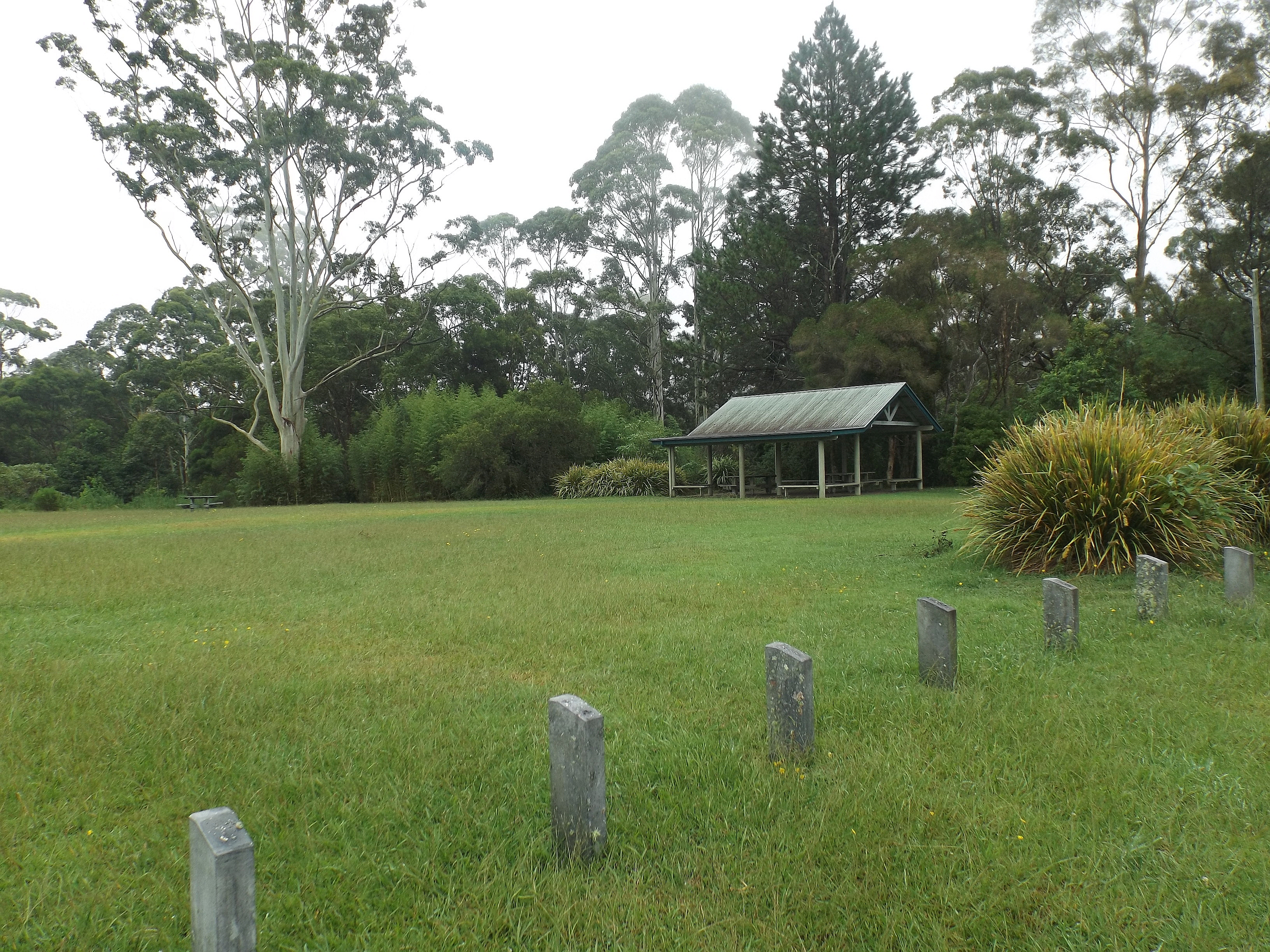
The Settlement picnic area, 2016

In 2008, Springbrook was the site for a trial that involved 200 distributed, wireless sensors that can monitor natural conditions such as humidity, temperature, light, rainfall, fog, water quality and sound. The cutting edge technology was developed by the CSIRO to assist research into the restoration of natural vegetation.

== Demographics ==
In the 2016 census, the locality of Springbrook had a population of 659.

In the 2021 census, the locality of Springbrook had a population of 705.

== Heritage listings ==
Springbrook has a number of heritage-listed sites, including:

- 3 Carricks Road: Springbrook Community Hall
- Springbrook–Mudgeeraba Road: Springbrook Road and associated infrastructure
- 2873 Springbrook Road: former Springbrook State School (QPWS Information Centre)

== Education ==
Springbrook State School is a government primary (Prep–6) school for boys and girls at 2327 Springbrook Road (28.1902°S 153.2645°E). In 2018, the school had an enrolment of 28 students with 7 teachers (3 full-time equivalent) and 6 non-teaching staff (2 full-time equivalent).

There is no secondary school in Springbrook. The nearest government secondary school is Robina State High School in Robina to the north-east.

== Amenities ==
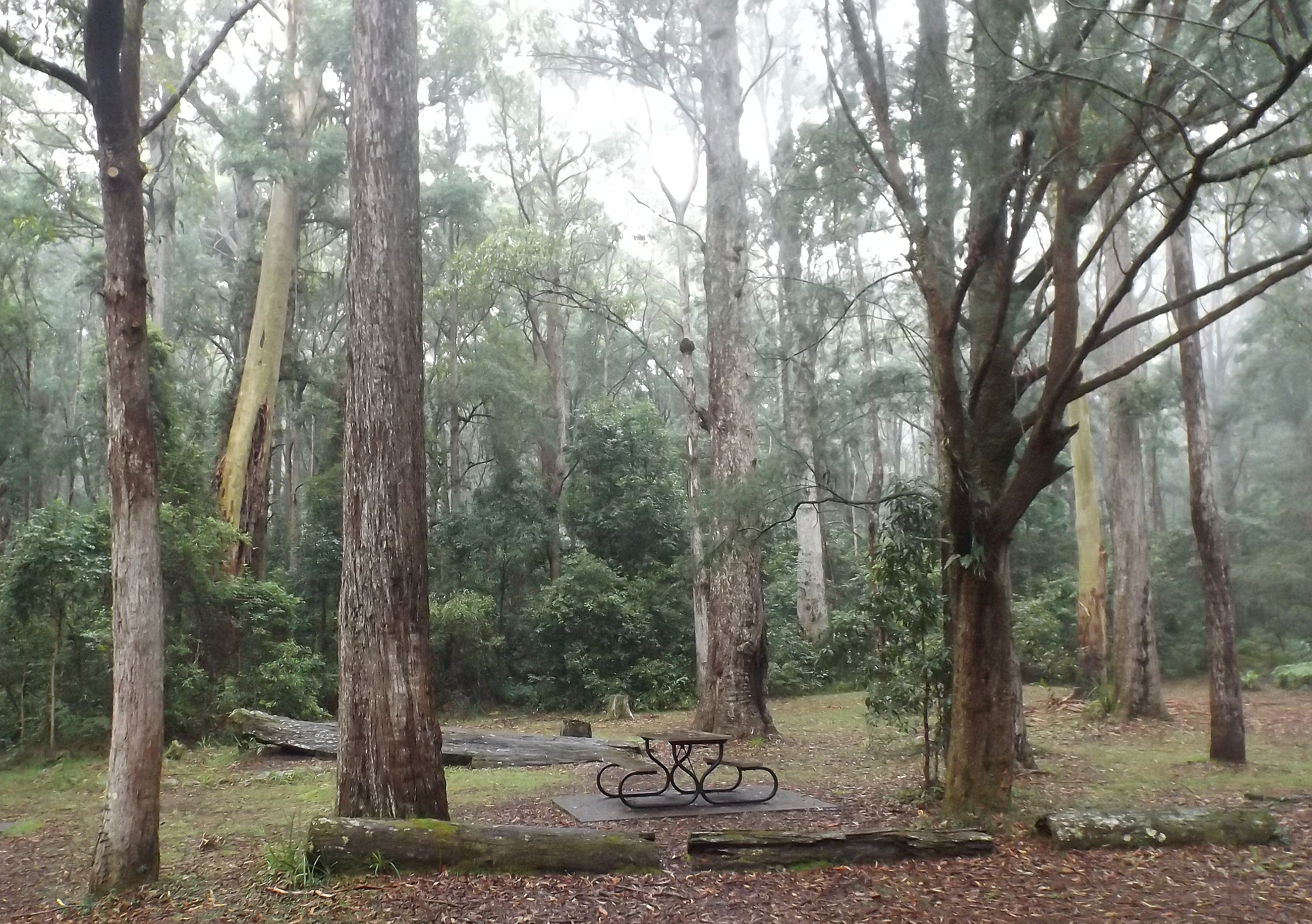
Apple Tree Park, 2016

Springbrook Community Centre is at 3-11 Carricks Road (28.1950°S 153.2689°E). Co-located with the community centre is the volunteer Springbrook Ambulance Station.

St Teresa's Catholic Community meets in private homes, but this practice has been suspended during the COVID-19 pandemic. It is part of the Burleigh Heads Catholic Parish within the Archdiocese of Brisbane.

The Springbrook Mudgeeraba branch of the Queensland Country Women's Association meets at the Bill Deacon Pavilion, Mudgeeraba Showgrounds at 115 Mudgeeraba Road, Worongary.

== Attractions ==
Springbrook National Park is a major attraction in the area. Bush camping is not permitted in the national park. There is one camping area in Carricks Road. Springbrook is the eastern end of the Gold Coast Hinterland Great Walk. This mountain hike links to O'Reilly's Rainforest Retreat via Binna Burra.

There are many lookouts in the locality, including, from north to south:

- Wedge Bluff Lookout (28.2175°S 153.2727°E)
- Rudder Lookout (28.2186°S 153.2730°E)
- Canyon Lookout (28.2205°S 153.2730°E)
- Boojerahla Lookout (28.2227°S 153.2858°E)
- Tallaringa Lookout (28.2230°S 153.2733°E)
- Goomoolahra Lookout (28.2233°S 153.2852°E)
- Bellaringa Lookout (28.2241°S 153.2736°E
- Reads Lookout (28.2336°S 153.2777°E)
- Dixie Lookout (28.2383°S 153.2697°E)

Although not in Springbrook, the Best of All Lookout (28.2422°S 153.2650°E) is only accessible from Repeater Station Road in Springbrook. It overlooks the Tweed Valley directly south of Springbrook. Purlingbrook Falls are Goomoolahra Falls are popular with tourists.

== See also ==
- List of Gold Coast suburbs
