= Springbrook State School =

School in Australia

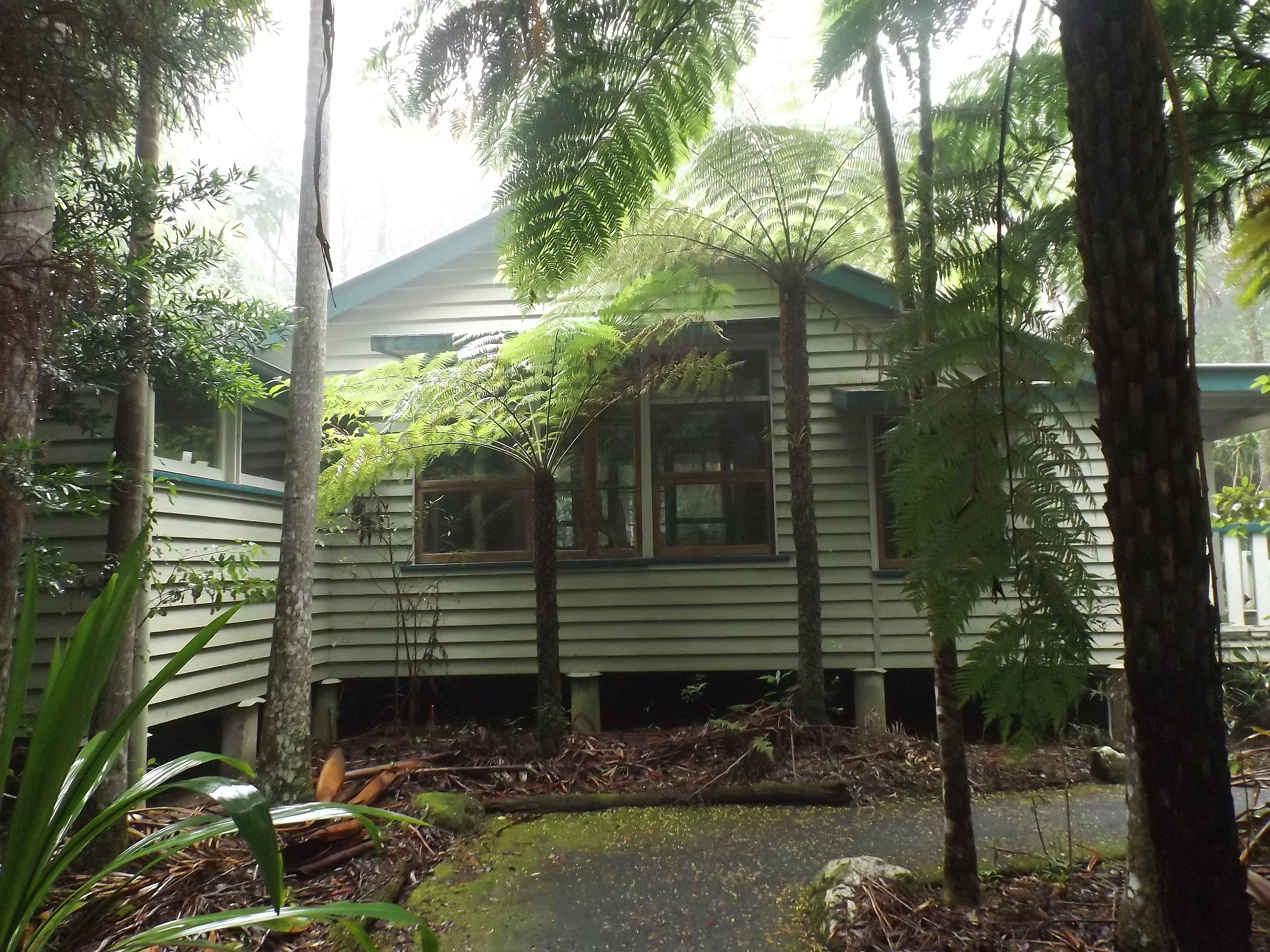
- Building in 2016

- Location within Queensland Location within Australia
- 28.2099°S 153.2706°E
- Location: Springbrook National Park, 2873 Springbrook Road, Springbrook, Gold Coast City, Queensland, Australia

History
- Design period: 1900–1914 (early 20th century)
- Built: 1911–1953

Site notes
- Architect: Department of Public Works
- Architectural style: Classicism

Queensland Heritage Register
- Official name: Former Springbrook State School (QPWS Information Centre), Queensland Parks and Wildlife Service Information Centre, Springbrook National Park
- Type: state heritage (built)
- Designated: 5 August 2003
- Reference no.: 602141
- Significant period: 1910s (historical); 1910s–1920s (fabric); 1911–1971 (social)
- Significant components: school/school room, tree

Springbrook State School is a heritage-listed former state school in Springbrook National Park at 2873 Springbrook Road, Springbrook, Gold Coast City, Queensland, Australia. It was designed by Department of Public Works and built from 1911 to 1953. It is also known as Queensland Parks and Wildlife Service Information Centre and is now part of the national park. It was added to the Queensland Heritage Register on 5 August 2003.

== History ==
The current Queensland Parks and Wildlife Service Information Centre, Springbrook, was erected as Springbrook State School in 1911. It was built by W Norman to a modified, low-set version of a standard Queensland Works Department School Plan.

Non-indigenous usage of the Springbrook Plateau began with the declaration of a Timber Reserve in 1879. Due mainly to inaccessibility, the timber was little exploited. In 1905, Gilbert Burnett, Forest Ranger, recommended that, as the hardwood could not be worked profitably, the area should be opened to selectors. The following year Alfrey Henry Burbank surveyed the plateau. Land was made available on the 3 September 1906, and the first settlers, mainly from the Bega area of the south coast of New South Wales, arrived in December 1906. They laboured to clear the thick bush and established small dairy and produce farms. Descendants of these settlers still live in the area. Within ten years large areas of the plateau were completely cleared.

Springbrook State School was established in 1911. In 1909, James Hardy corresponded with the Undersecretary of the Department of Public Instruction, David Ewart, concerning the possibility of a school being established at Springbrook. There were insufficient numbers for a State School and the community was not ready to fund a provisional school. The following year the Department of Public Lands received a petition to reserve an area for a school and dip, part of portion 91 held by John Boyd as Agricultural Farm 5256, Brisbane District. In February 1910, a public meeting was held to elect a School Building Committee and an "Application for a State School" was sent to the department. In March Inspector John Shirley inspected the area and recommended establishment of a school on 15 acres to be surrendered to the Lands Department by W. Boyd. The Department of Public Works was requested to provide a plan and estimate for a school, and they suggested that reducing the structure to one verandah and stumps only two foot high would reduce the cost. W. Norman won the contract for £209 and the Inspector of Works reported the completion of the building on 18 March 1911. Miss Elisabeth Josephine McMahon was the first teacher and fifteen children were enrolled when the Springbrook State School opened on the 26 April 1911.

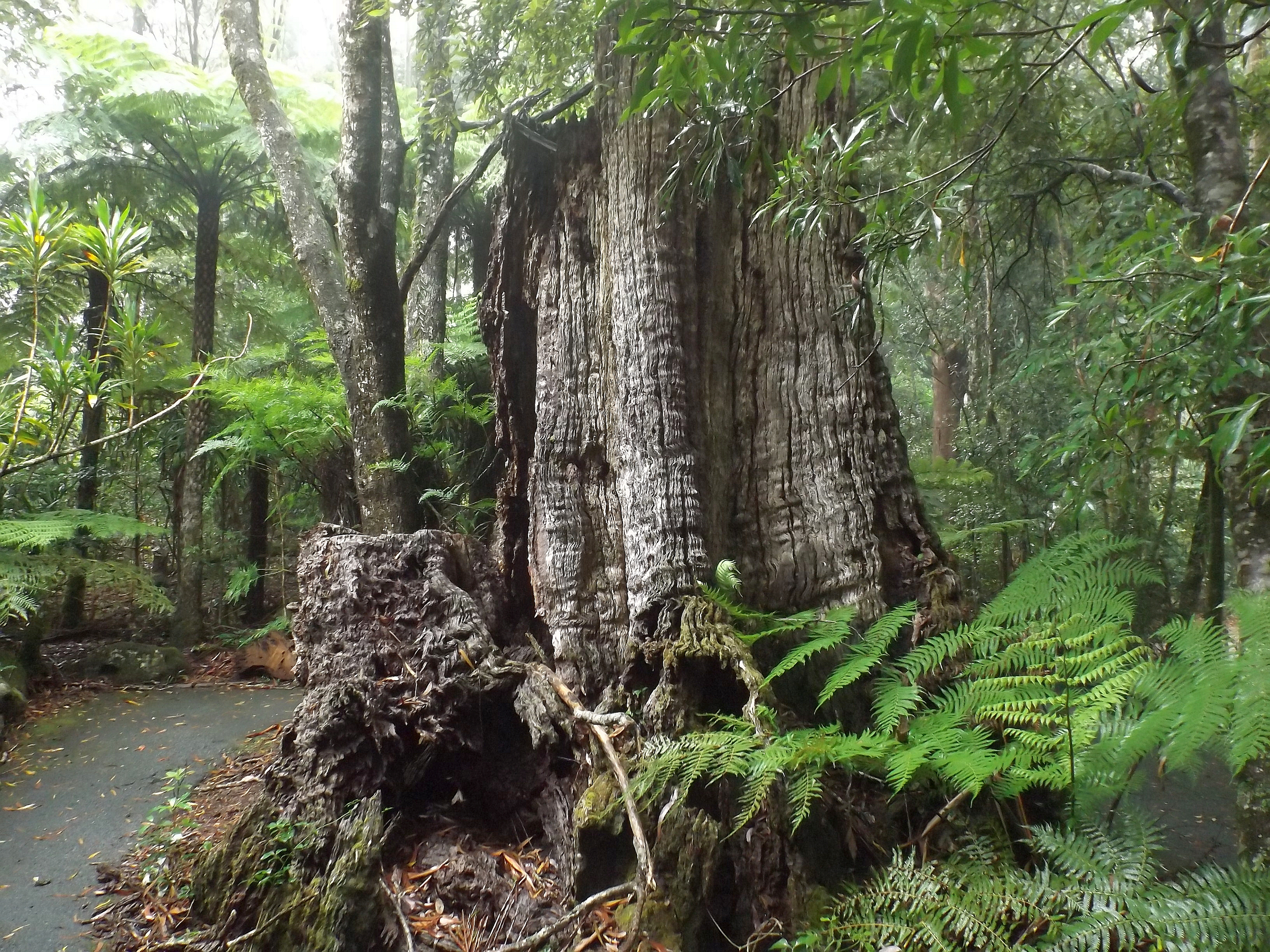
New England Mountain Ash stump, 2016

In the following year an extremely large New England Mountain Ash (Eucalyptus andrewsii), which grew beside the school, was cut down and burnt. The stump of this tree remains beside the school building and springboard marks are still evident on the side. In 1912, the schoolyard was fenced. In 1914, following an application to John George Appel, the Home Secretary, who lived at Beechmont and understood the weather, a stove was installed in the school. In 1915, tenders were called for the erection of a rear verandah and BF Franklin tendered £50/5/0 and was accepted. The verandah was completed in September 1915. At some stage in the early years George Morton and Colin Sprenger laid an ant bed tennis court at the site of the current carpark. Further minor repairs and painting were undertaken over the years. In 1932, the school was restumped, but the stumps were too small and the building suffered from subsidence. In 1953, new windows were installed and in 1954 the playshed was erected, on the site of a previous rough shed. At some time in the 1950s the verandahs were enclosed and a small room was built adjoining the rear verandah.

The school was closed at various times during its term. In 1915, a teacher did not arrive for several months and in 1929 Grace Ethel Baker arrived as teacher but left the next day and no teacher was appointed until March. By May 1932 enrolment had dropped to ten, with an average attendance of less than six students. The Director of Education wrote and informed the committee that the small enrolment did not justify keeping the school open and the children would be accepted in the Correspondence School. Following appeals, this decision was repealed and Mr Mackie remained as teacher. By January 1933, however, enrolment had fallen to nine, and the Director of Education closed the school in March. Plans were made for moving the school building and equipment to Wunburra. A petition with 29 signatures was received protesting this removal and in May 1934 Inspector Bevington recommended that the school be opened on a trial for three months to see if attendance would improve.

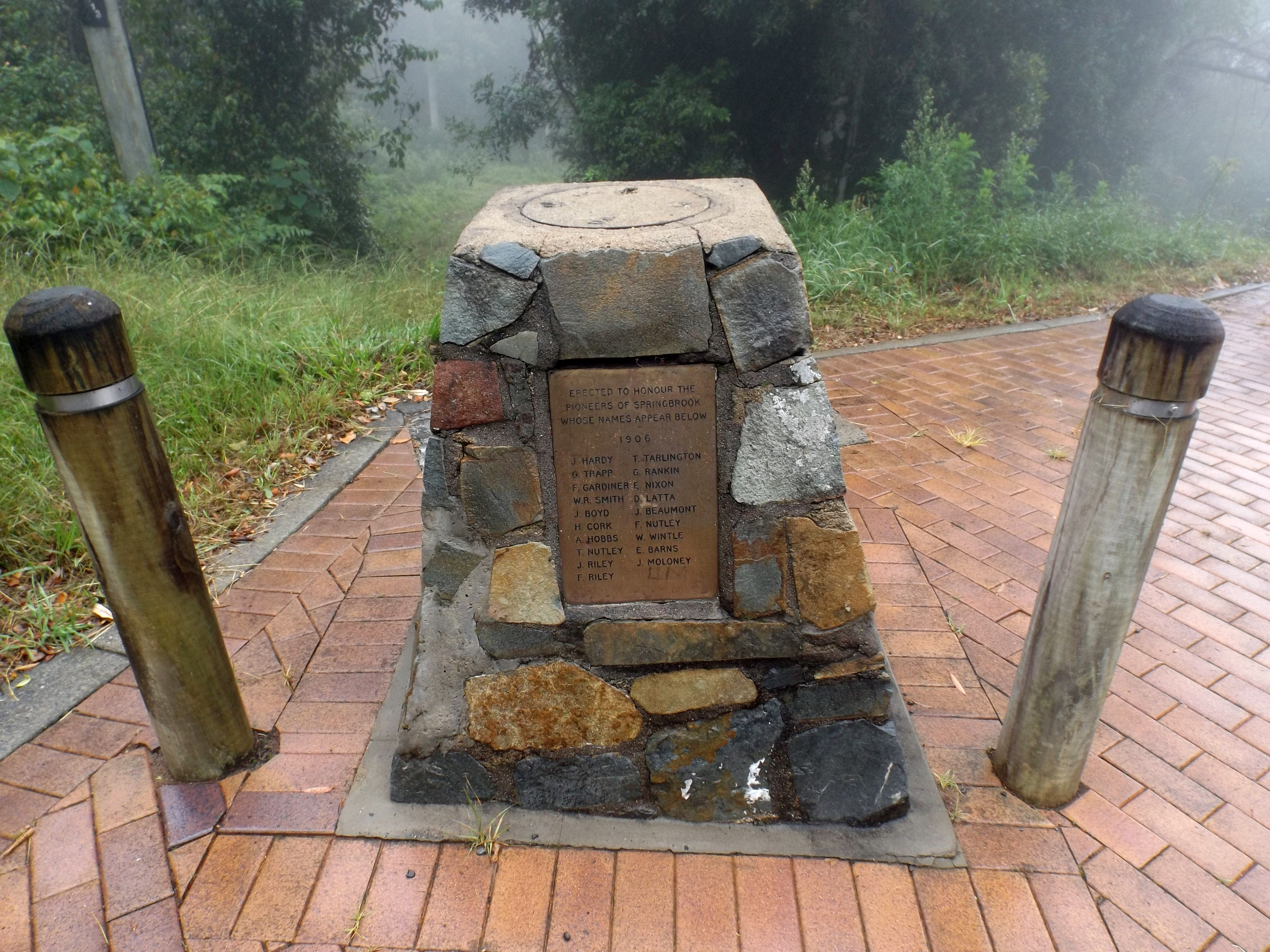
Pioneers Memorial Cairn, 2016

In 1961, local residents celebrated the 50th anniversary of the school by constructing a memorial cairn at Hardy's Lookout on Springbrook-Mudgeeraba Road. The cairn lists pioneers of the district.

In 1971, only four children were enrolled at Springbrook State School and the school was closed in February. The Springbrook pupils were transferred to Mudgereeba State School, as were the furniture and fittings from the former Springbrook State School. School Reserve 454, comprising approximately three hectares, and its buildings was transferred to the National Parks and Wildlife Service (NPWS). The school building was used occasionally for training police cadets and then as offices by the NPWS until being converted into an Information Centre for Warrie National Park (now part of Springbrook National Park). National Parks toilets were built at the site. In 1986, the building was renovated and restumped with the aid of a Commonwealth Employment Scheme. The window paint was stripped, a new front verandah and access ramp were built and cork flooring, a pot-belly stove and information displays were installed. Landscaping was undertaken and a board walk and lookout were built. When Mount Cougal, Warrie, Wunbburra, Gwongrella and Natural Bridge National Parks amalgamated in 1990, the old school building became the Information Centre for Springbrook National Park. Over the years the area has been revegetated and the largely cleared school site is now primarily bush. In 2003, new water tanks were installed.

As dairy farming became less profitable, farms were subdivided and the population of Springbrook grew from fifty in the 1950s to 400 in 1990. In 1984, the new Springbrook State School (School number 1931) was opened at 2327 Springbrook Road.

== Description ==
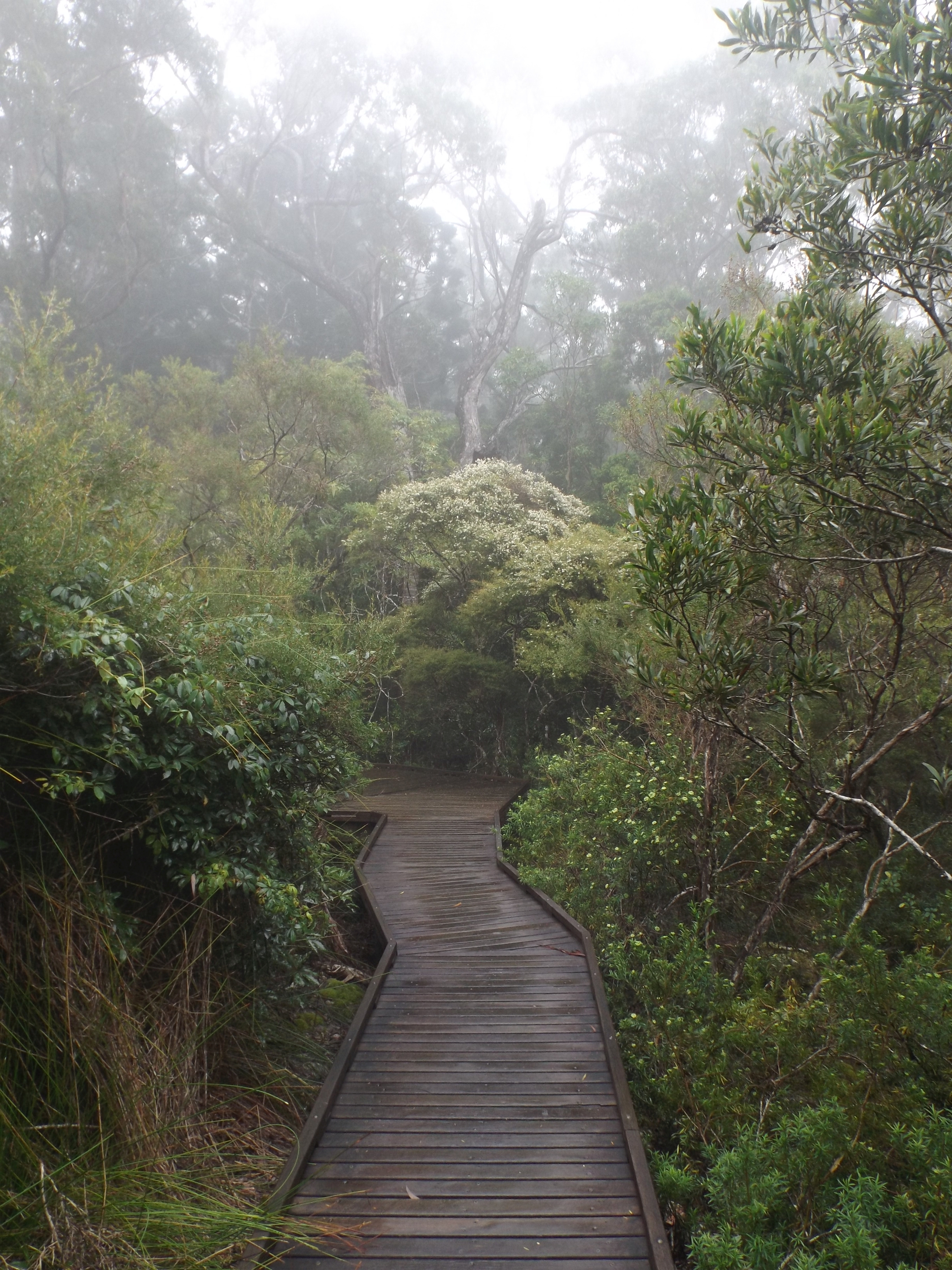
The building is surrounded by rainforest and has a path leading to a lookout

The former Springbrook State School sits on a revegetated site with considerable regrowth and understorey growth. The site includes a number of structures: the Information Centre, playshed, toilet block, carpark, stump, water trough, and tanks. Beyond these is a boardwalk and lookout.

The Information Centre is in the former Springbrook State School building (1911). It is a modified version of a standard Queensland Works Department School Plan. It is a low-set timber-framed, weatherboard-clad building with a gabled roof clad in corrugated iron, and numerous additions and alterations. It consists of a large classroom, an enclosed verandah at the rear, comprising two rooms, an additional kitchen adjoining the enclosed verandah, a new front verandah and an access ramp.

The classroom is a large asymmetrical VJ lined room. The tongue and groove ceiling slopes at the northern and southern ends, which were originally separate verandahs. On the southern end, the wall to the back rooms supports the additional span of the ceiling, and at the north a metal support beam has been added. The door in the northern wall is a recent French door with French lights. The southern door is a sliding boarded door, with an opening for a display. Windows on the eastern and western walls consist of a pair of hoppers to the north (covered by a display on the western wall) and a bank of windows under the central flat ceiled area. This bank of windows consists of a central casement pair (original) and a slightly taller group of two hoppers, topped by louvres. The hardware on the windows varies. The sills are made from red cedar and silky oak, now stripped and varnished. The windows all have simple awnings. The floor is covered in cork tiles. Bricks have been laid on a portion of the eastern wall and the adjoining floor to provide fire-protection for a pot-belly stove. A blackboard and display board are on the northern wall. Displays of varying permanence have been constructed in the room, including a false suspended ceiling, replicating forest shade and a "pioneer room" in the northwest corner.

The three rooms at the rear of the building consist of two rooms in the verandah area and an additional kitchen on the eastern wall. The western room is entered from the central room and has one VJ wall and the remainder clad in fibrous cement sheeting and a sloped fibrous cement ceiling which continues the line from the classroom. There is a double pair of hopper windows with steel hardware and the floor is covered in cork tiles. A large portion of the room is occupied by temporary walls for a display. The central room has the same ceiling and floor as the western room, and is primarily a corridor. Doors open onto the exit stairs, the two other back rooms and the classroom. There is one fixed window with glazing in four panels. The eastern room is a newer addition with concrete stumps, a separate roof structure, a flat ceiling and a narrow board floor. It is lined with fibro boards, with no cover strips and there is one set of hopper windows on the north and a sink on the eastern wall.

The existing front verandah is a more recent structure (1986), built to resemble the original verandah (now enclosed) but with a separate roofline and supported on steel posts. It consists of timber railings and vertical balustrades except on the western end where it is enclosed in weatherboards to replicate the port rack area of the original verandah. The ramp is designed for wheelchair access and continues the structure of the verandah, on steel stumps. The playshed (1954) is a rectangular unlined and timber structure with a concrete floor, constructed to a standard Queensland Works Department plan. It appears to have been built in the position of another structure as there are post holes remaining in the concrete floor. The walls are built of alternating wide and narrow vertical boards, which overlap each other. It appears to be roofed with Super 6 sheeting. The shed contains a restored Queensland Buckboard, which belonged to James Hardy, a Springbrook pioneer, and other equipment.

The toilet block is a semi-enclosed structure built from rock and timber with a metal roof, of National Parks vintage. It is divided into two separate rooms, each with a WC and external basin. The carpark is recent, having been built on the site of the school tennis court. The stump is the remains of a New England Mountain Ash (E. andrewsii) and is located about three metres from the main school building. The stump remains, approximately 3.5 metres (11 ft) tall, complete with traces of springboard marks. The water trough was added to the tank region after 1953. It is a metal trough with three taps that feed directly off the tank. The tanks consist of two tanks near the school and playshed (both metal, installed 2003) and one above the toilet block, which although older is due for replacement and may already be replaced. These are not considered to be of heritage significance. The boardwalk and lookout were constructed from treated pine in 1986 and are not considered to be of heritage significance.

== Heritage listing ==
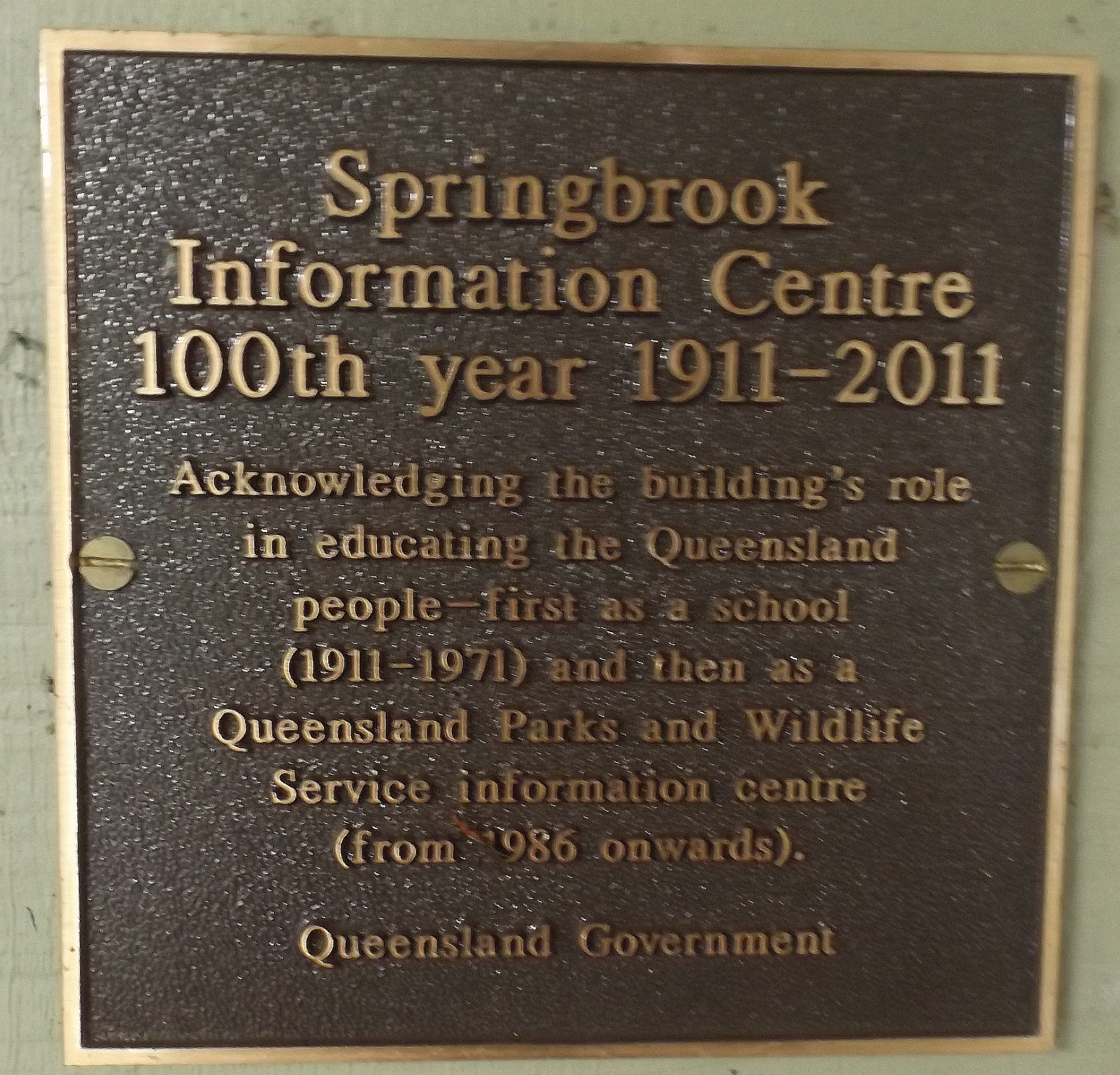
Plaque, 2016

The former Springbrook State School (QPWS Information Centre) was listed on the Queensland Heritage Register on 5 August 2003 having satisfied the following criteria.

The place is important in demonstrating the evolution or pattern of Queensland's history.

The former Springbrook State School, constructed in 1911, is significant as evidence of the late settlement of the difficult to access mountain plateaux of the Gold Coast hinterland. The Springbrook Plateau was settled as late as 1906 and then was only minimally developed and sparsely populated as a farming community. The former Springbrook State School is evidence of this early period, being the first public building erected and the oldest remaining building on the plateau.

The Stump is demonstrative of earlier attitudes to vegetation, particularly given the late 20th century re-vegetation program on the site.

The place is important in demonstrating the principal characteristics of a particular class of cultural places.

It is an attractive, although somewhat modified, version of typical small, early 20th century school designed by the Queensland Works Department. The 1954 playshed is important in illustrating the principal characteristics of its type, a standard design also supplied by the Queensland Works Department.

The place has a strong or special association with a particular community or cultural group for social, cultural or spiritual reasons.

The place has a strong association with the Springbrook community, having been a social centre as well as the only educational establishment for six decades.
