= Springbrook National Park =

National park in Australia

- IUCN category II (national park)
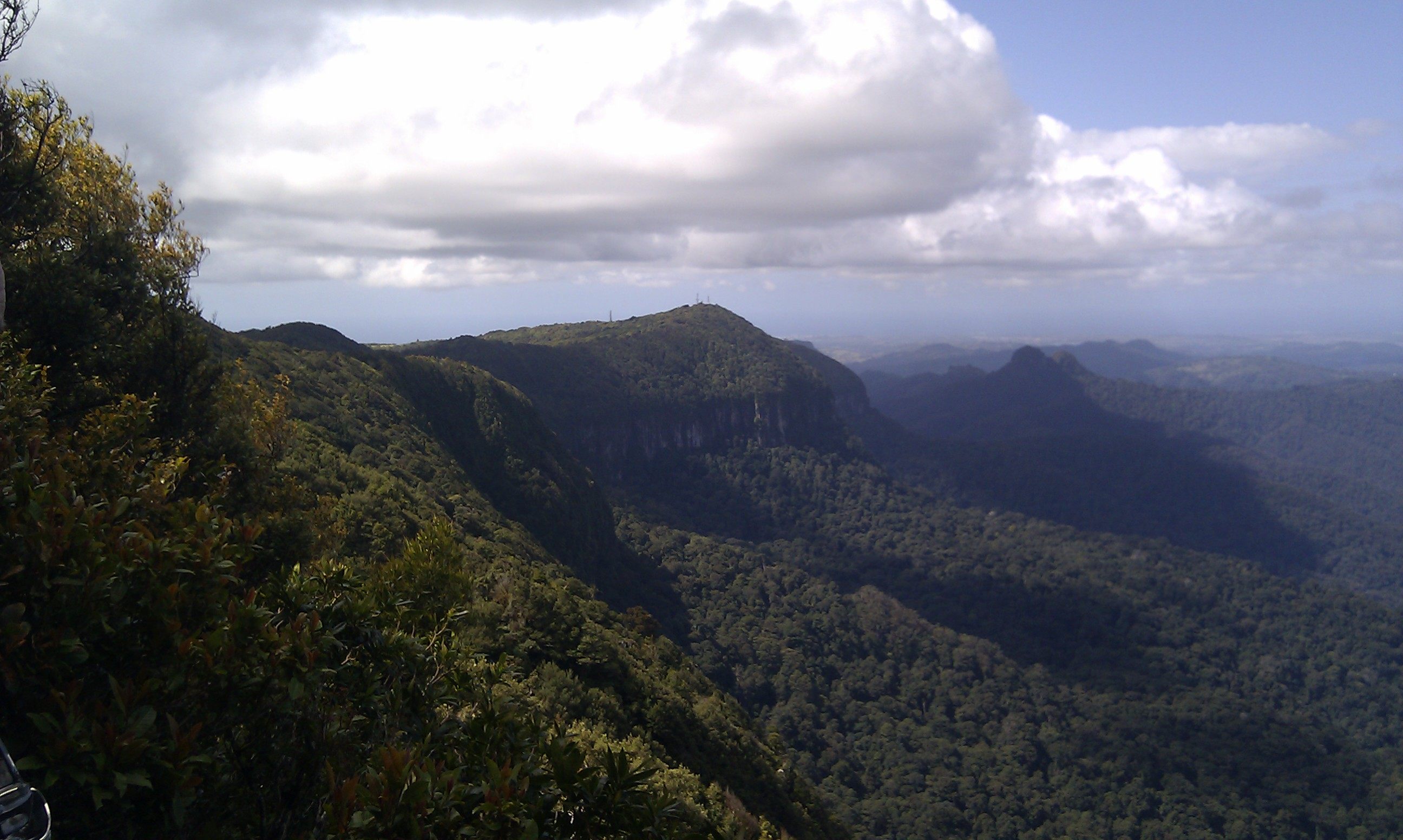
- The peaks of Springbrook form the north-eastern remains of the eroded Mount Warning caldera. Mount Cougal and the Gold Coast urban strip can also be seen.

- Location within Queensland
- Location: Queensland
- Nearest city: Mudgeeraba
- Coordinates: 28°08′24″S 153°16′27″E
- Area: 61.56 km^{2} (23.77 sq mi)
- Established: 1990
- Governing body: Queensland Parks and Wildlife Service
- Website: Official website

The Springbrook National Park is a protected national park in the Gold Coast hinterland of Queensland, Australia. The 6,197-hectare (15,310-acre) park is situated on the McPherson Range, near Springbrook, approximately 100 kilometres (62 mi) south of Brisbane. The park is part of the Shield Volcano Group of the UNESCO World Heritage–listed Gondwana Rainforests of Australia.

In December 1994, the UNESCO World Heritage Committee officially extended the area now known as the Gondwana Rainforests of Australia World Heritage Area over the Scenic Rim (including Main Range, Mount Barney, Lamington, and Springbrook National Parks, and Goomburra Forest Reserve) and the rainforests of northern New South Wales. In 2007 the areas of the Gondwana Rainforests of Australia were added to the Australian National Heritage List. The park is part of the Scenic Rim Important Bird Area, identified as such by BirdLife International because of its importance in the conservation of several species of threatened birds.

In 2009 as part of the Q150 celebrations, the Springbrook National Park was announced as one of the Q150 Icons of Queensland for its role as a "Natural attraction".

The park was the location for the discovery of the rare Eucryphia jinksii species of subtropical tree.

== Mount Cougal section ==
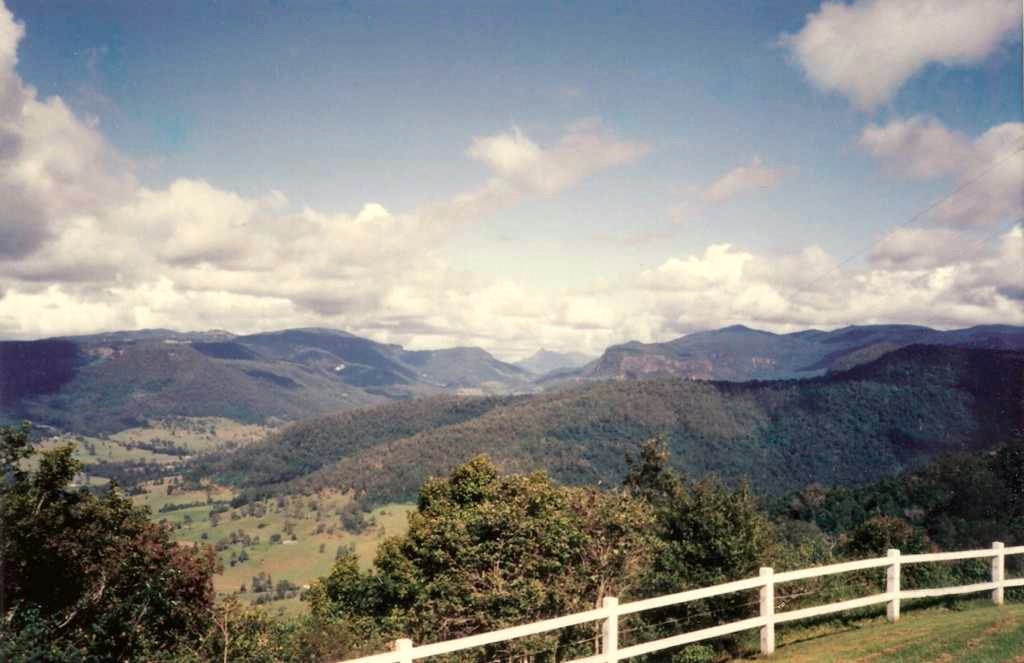
Springbrook Plateau to the left of Numinbah Valley and Lamington National Park

The Mount Cougal section of the park is located about 20 kilometres (12 mi) inland from Currumbin. It was begun in 1938 with 142 hectares (350 acres) set aside, and additions over time brought it to 811 hectares (2,000 acres) and in 1990 it was amalgamated with the Springbrook National Park. The section is named for Mount Cougal which is in the park, located just on the Queensland side of the border with New South Wales. The mountain has two peaks, called the East Peak and West Peak, rising 694 metres (2,277 ft) above sea level.

The local Yugambeh Aboriginal peoples call the peaks Ningeroongun and Barrajanda. They tell of a legendary hunter called Gwayla who had two prized hunting dogs (dingos). They were killed and they were buried under the twin peaks, and from then on the peaks were known by their names.

The only tracks or facilities in this section of the park are at Cougal's Cascades which are the headwaters of the Currumbin Creek. A road leads into a carpark and picnic ground, and from there a walking track goes up the creek cascades. There are no official tracks up Mount Cougal itself, but there are informal trails from the NSW side of the border that lead to the east peak of Mount Cougal.

In 1943 a bush sawmill was established near the creek, producing timber for packing crates for the local banana growers when other timber supplies were being directed towards World War II. The easily milled timbers of the flooded gum and blue fig were taken, and later various other timbers. It ceased operations in 1955 due to an especially wet winter. A small display of some of the sawmill parts was restored in 1986 at the end of the walking track.

== Natural Bridge section ==
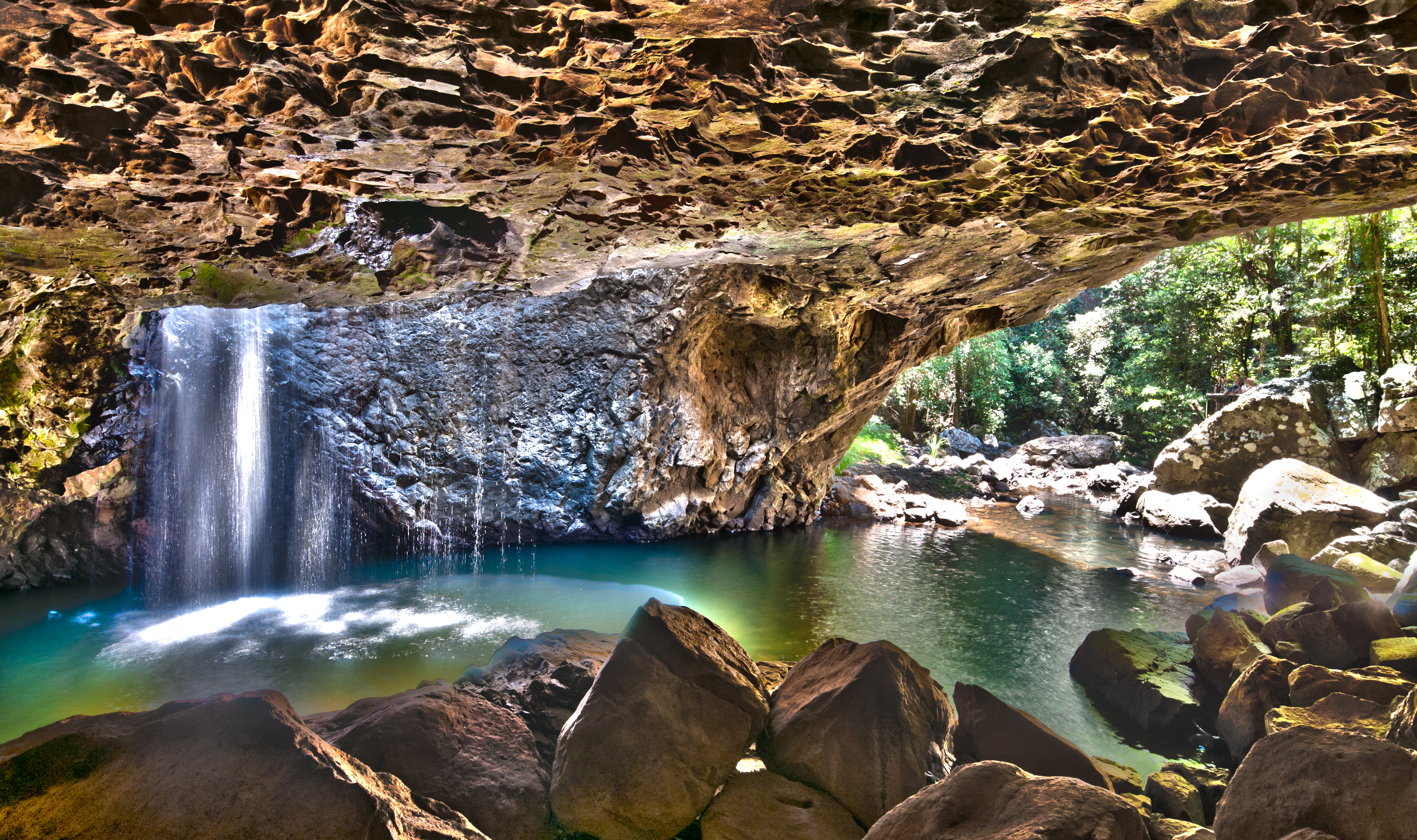
The waterfall being viewed within Springbrook Cave, 2012

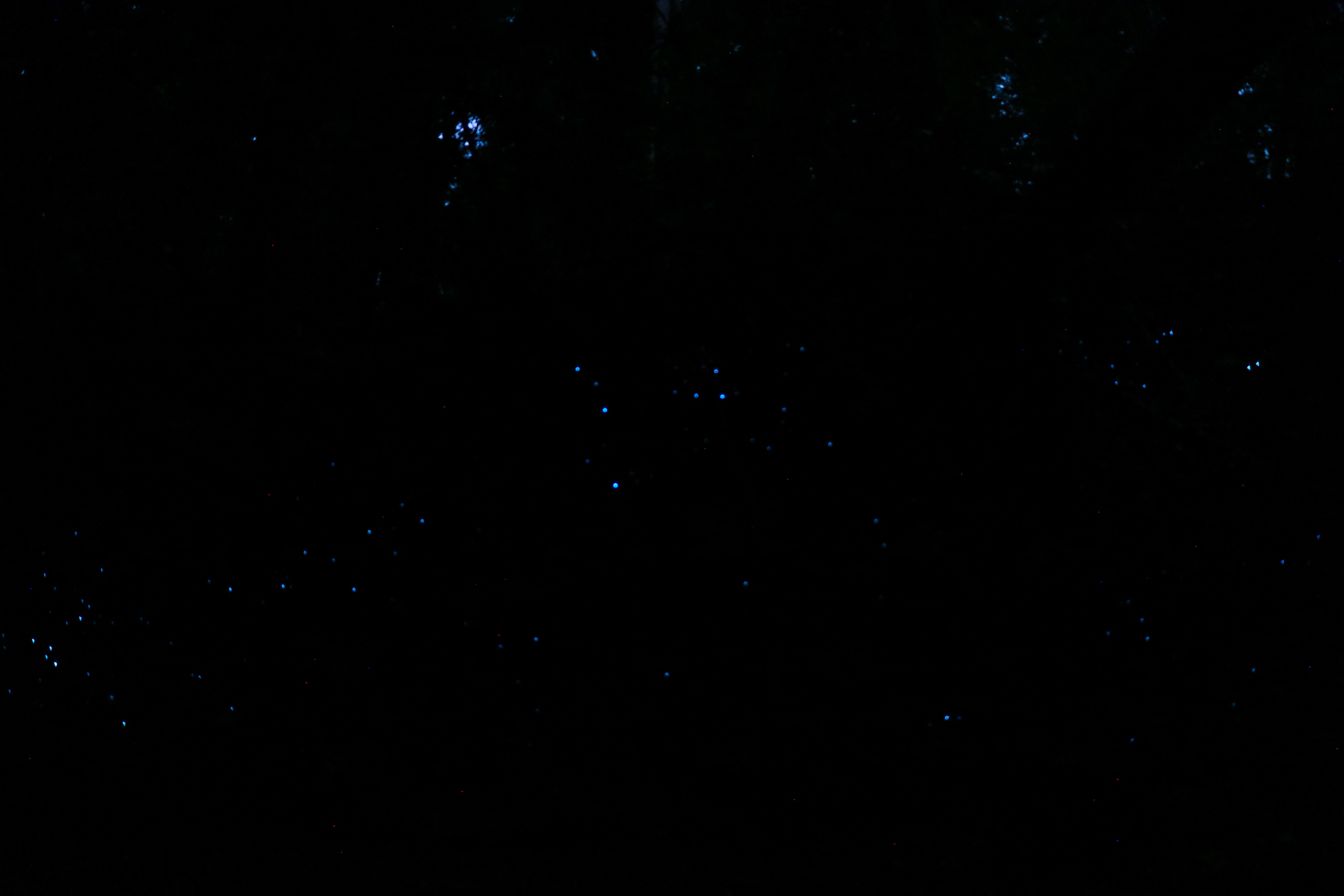
Arachnocampa flava in one of the caves in the national park

The Natural Bridge, also known as Natural Arch, is a naturally formed rock arch over Cave Creek, a tributary of the Nerang River. It was formed from a waterfall that undercut a cave beneath the waterfall and dug a pothole on top, until the two joined and the creek flowed through the cave, leaving an arch across the front.

The bridge is in the territory of the local Kombumerri Aboriginal people (a family group of the Yugambeh language peoples). The first Europeans to find it are said to be timber cutters Alexander (Sandy) Duncan and Denis (Din) Guinea who were shown there by Yugambeh man Kipper Tommy in the early 1890s.

The cave is home to a colony of glowworms (larvae of the insect Arachnocampa flava) and commercial operators lead night tours into the cave. The ‘light’ seen is produced within the glowworm's body. It is the reaction of four chemicals that produces the cold light or bioluminescence—meaning ‘living light’. Glowworms generate this bioluminescence to lure their prey.

Swimming is no longer permitted to protect the glowworm habitat. This applies to the area bounded by the walking track/circuit. Downstream access to the creek is allowed but the pools are too shallow for swimming. Access to this section of the park is from Nerang-Murwillumbah Road.

== Springbrook Plateau section ==
Several waterfalls may be seen along relatively short tracks in the Springbrook Plateau section. The return circuit walk that begins at either the Tallanbana or Goomoolahra picnic areas passes Twin Falls, Rainbow Falls, Goomoolahra Falls, Kadjagooma Falls, Ngarri-dhum Falls, Gooroolba Falls, Poonyahra Falls, Poondahra Falls, and Blackfellow Falls. The Gwongorella picnic area is the access point for walks to Purlingbrook Falls and Tanninaba Falls.

In all four sections of Springbrook National Park (Springbrook Plateau, Natural Bridge, Numinbah, and Mount Cougal) visitors can picnic, study nature and enjoy a wide range of walks in a natural environment. Springbrook Plateau section has several lookouts and viewing points. Access to the plateau and park is by a sealed road from Nerang via the Numinbah Valley or by road from Mudgeeraba.

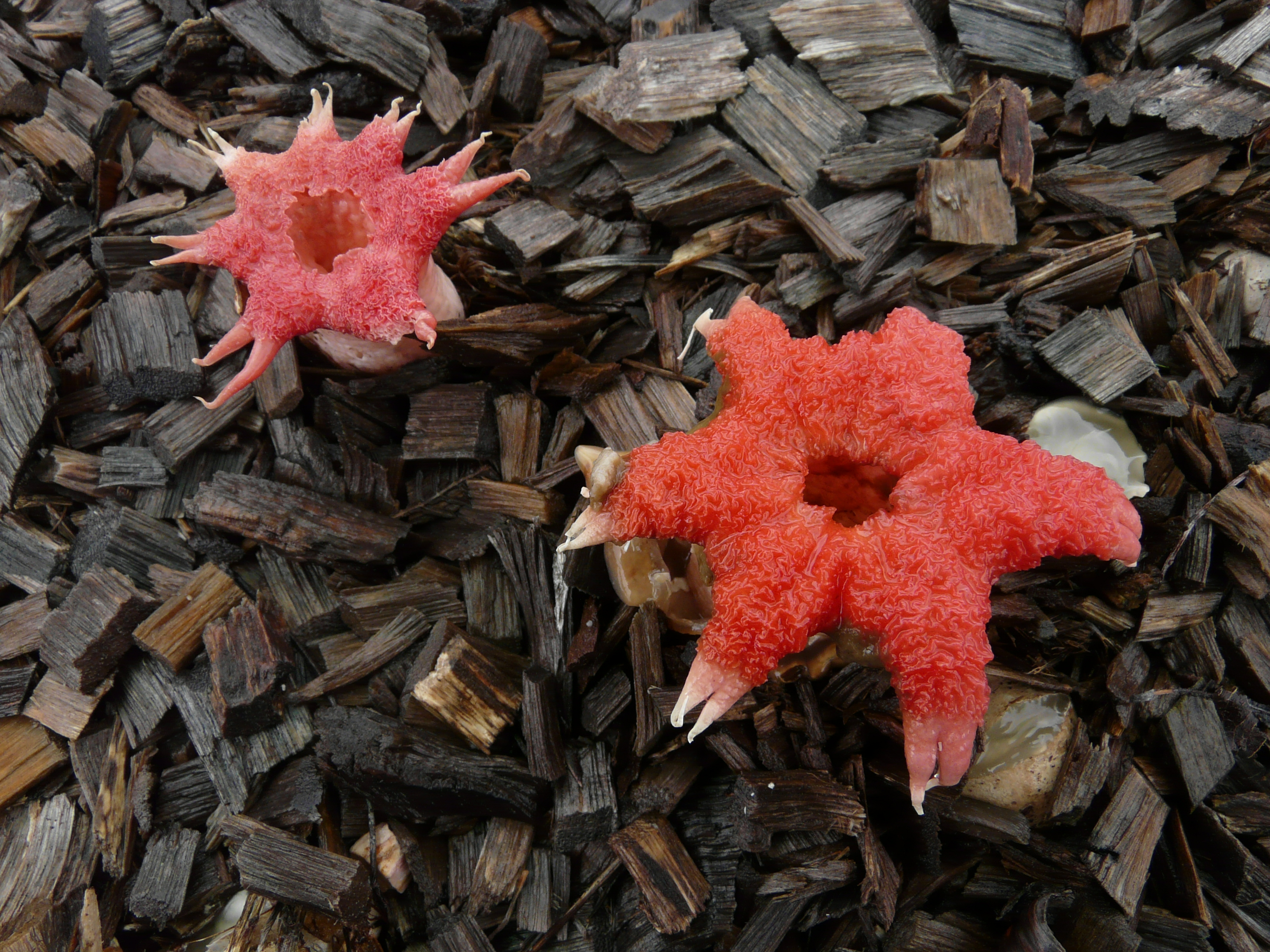
Stinkhorn (Aseroë rubra)

At between 600 and 1,000 metres (2,000 and 3,300 ft) above sea level, Springbrook Plateau can be quite cool even in summer. The area averages more than 3,000 millimetres (120 in) of rain a year, most of which falls between December and March. Natural Bridge section receives most of its annual rainfall, 2,500 millimetres (98 in), during the hot, humid summer. This is also the location where the UK television programme I'm a Celebrity... Get Me out of Here! has been filmed.

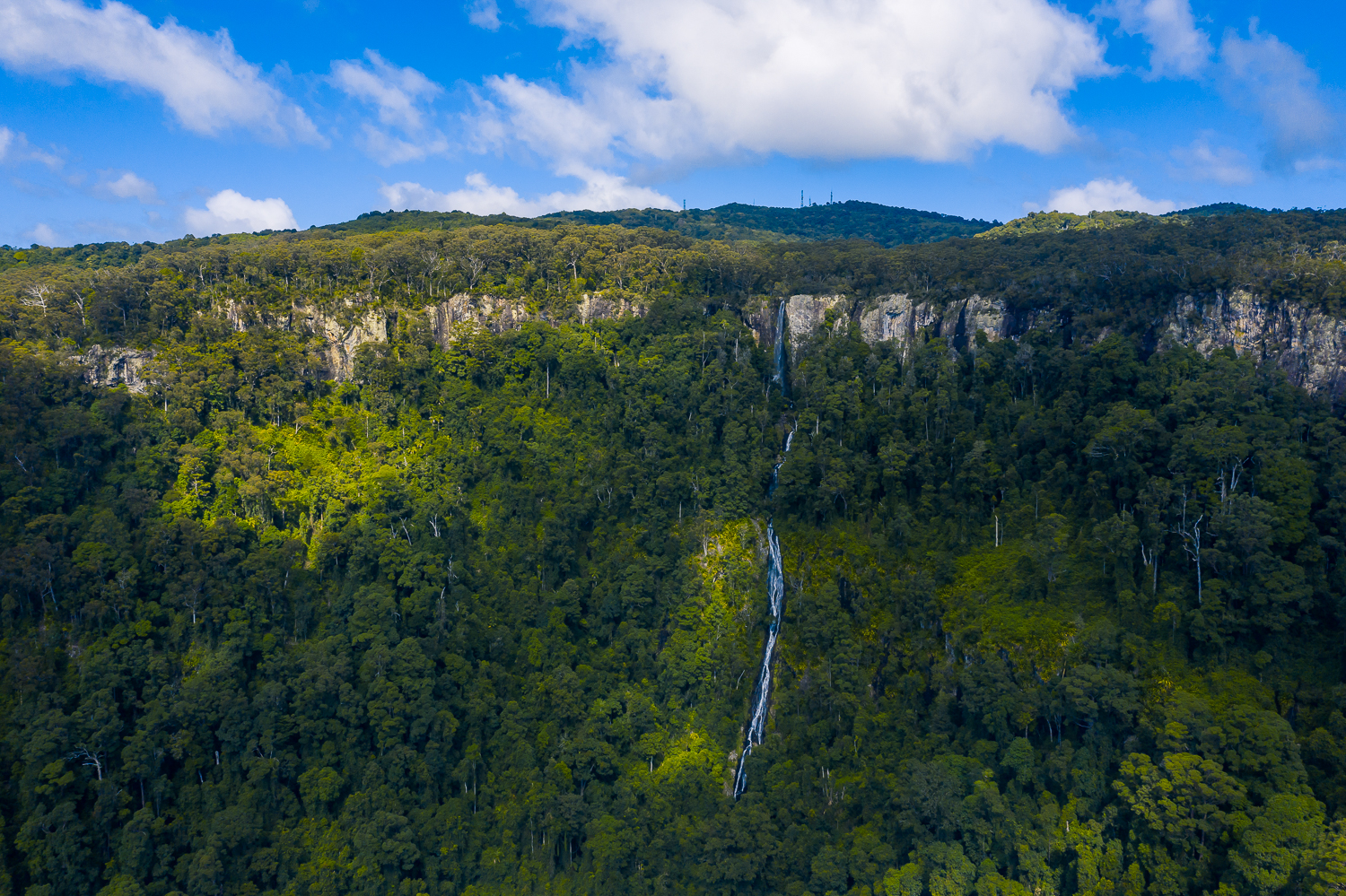
Twin Falls Waterfall seen from the start of the Twin Falls Circuit trail

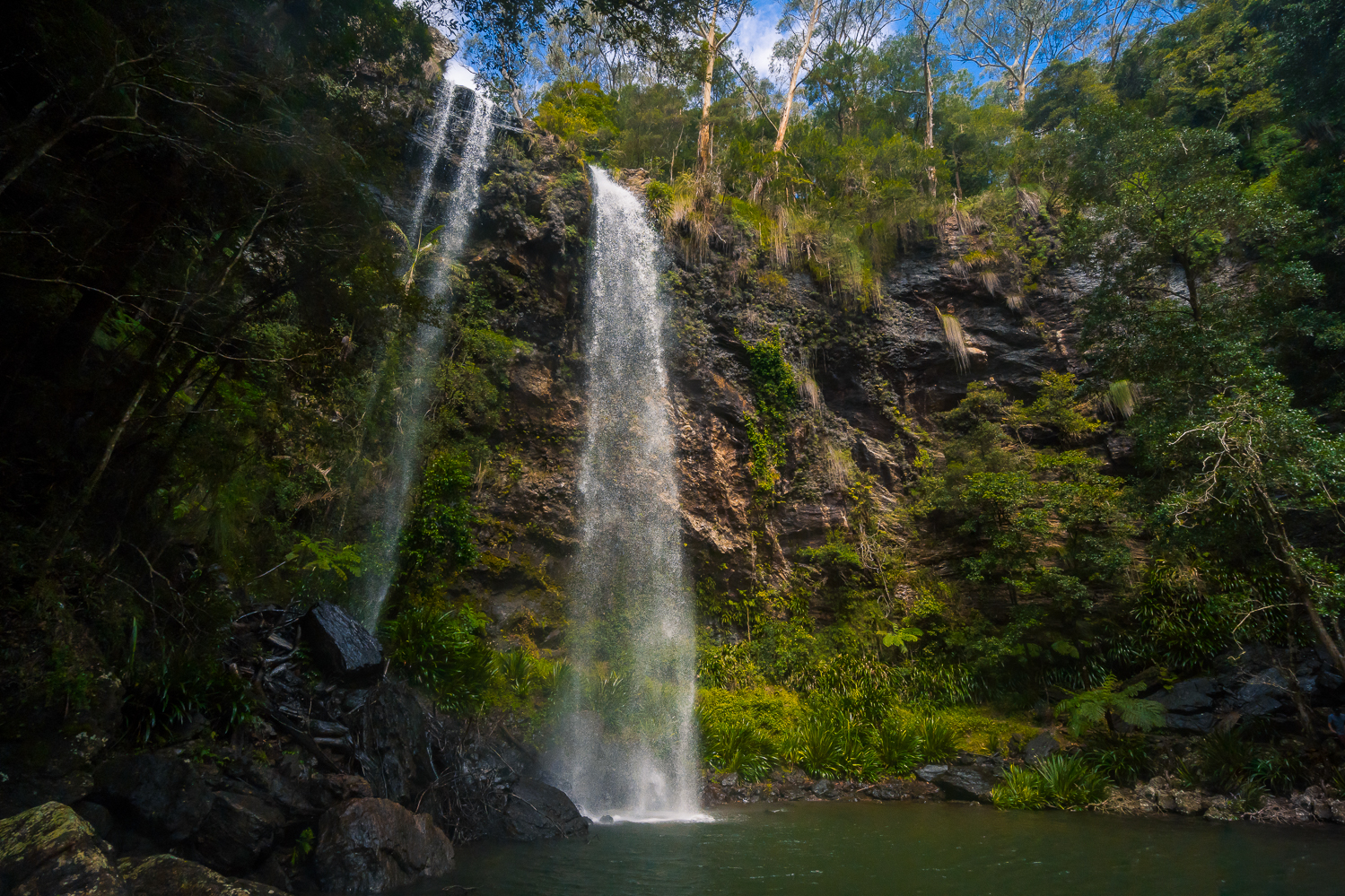
Bottom of the Twin Falls Circuit

== Environment ==
=== Landforms ===
The southern cliffs in Springbrook and Lamington National Park are part of the remnants of the northern rim of the huge, ancient Tweed Volcano. The Springbrook National Park comprises four reserves on and around the plateau: Springbrook Plateau section along the crest of the plateau; Mount Cougal section to the east; and Natural Bridge and Numinbah sections to the west. The cliffs are resistant, volcanic based rhyolite. Rock overhangs are common and massive rock falls sometimes dislodge house-sized rocks.

The national park preserves rainforest and eucalypt forests in the cliff-lined headwaters of rivers and creeks flowing to the Gold Coast, in particular, the Nerang River on the plateau's west and Little Nerang River to the east, both of which have eroded less resistant rock. Where the waterways flow over the escarpment, 16 waterfalls have developed.

=== Flora ===
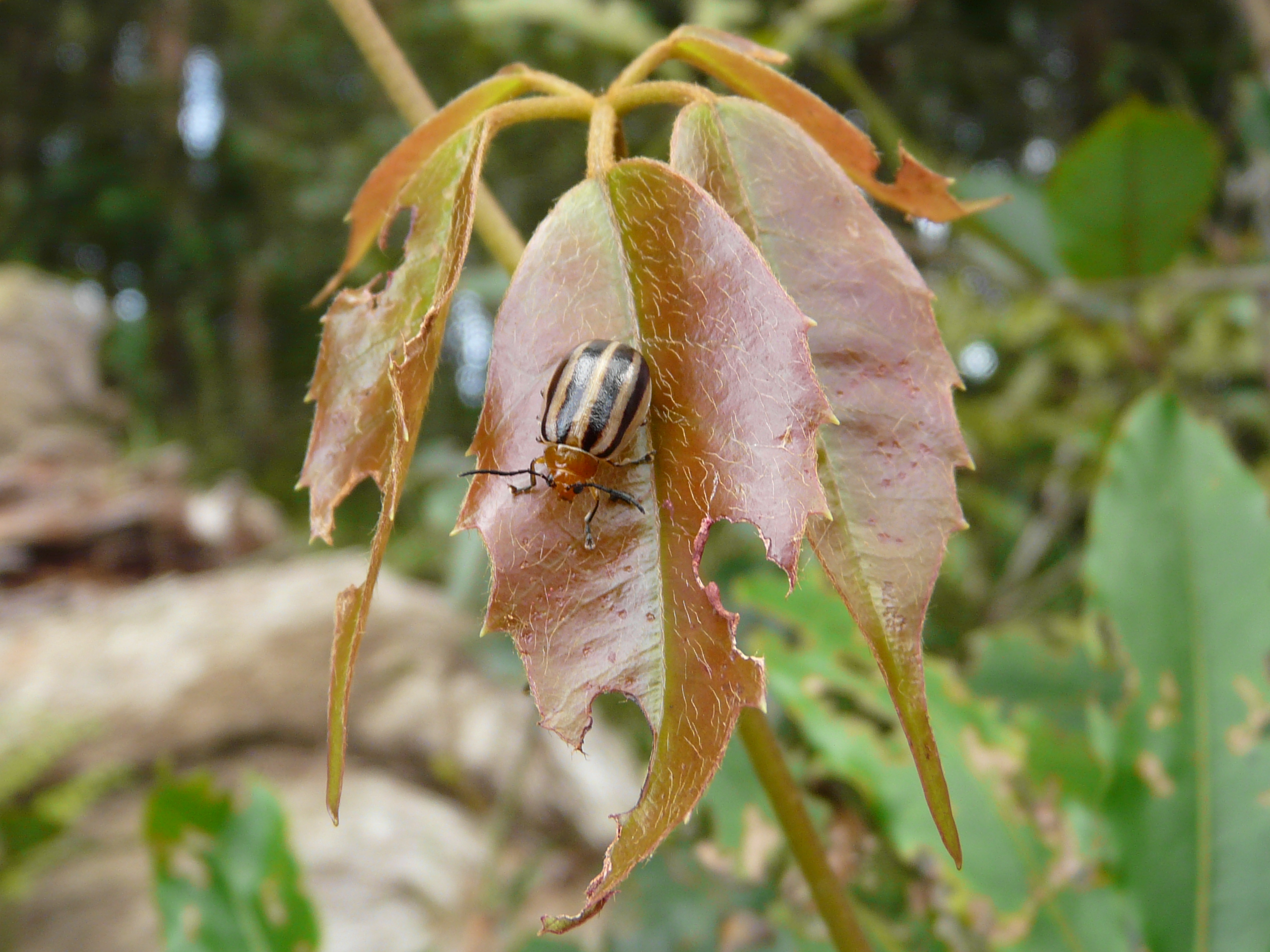
Beetle on a leaf near Goomoolahra Falls

The flora is highly diverse due to the high rainfall and variety of volcanic soil types. Subtropical rainforest dominated by black and white booyong Argyrodendron spp. is prominent on basaltic soils while warm temperate rainforest that is dominated by coachwood, occurs on the poorer rhyolitic soils. Giant brush box are found to the east of the plateau and flooded gums may also be found in areas of basalt soils. One small stand of cool temperate rainforest, dominated by Antarctic beech, is located at the Best of All Lookout just over the border in New South Wales. Some of the beech trees are 3,000 years old. Remarkably the Springbrook leatherwood, a tree which grows to 25 m in height and is found only in warm temperate rainforest on Springbrook, was not discovered until 1993, by local botanist David Jinks.

Other more fire-prone areas support open forests dominated by New England blackbutt and Blue Mountains ash. Grasstrees are commonly seen in the park. Rock outcrops support areas of montane heath or shrubland dominated by species such as Leptospermum variable, Banksia spinulosa and Prostanthera phylicifolia. These heath areas are best appreciated in spring when most of the wildflowers bloom.

=== Fauna ===
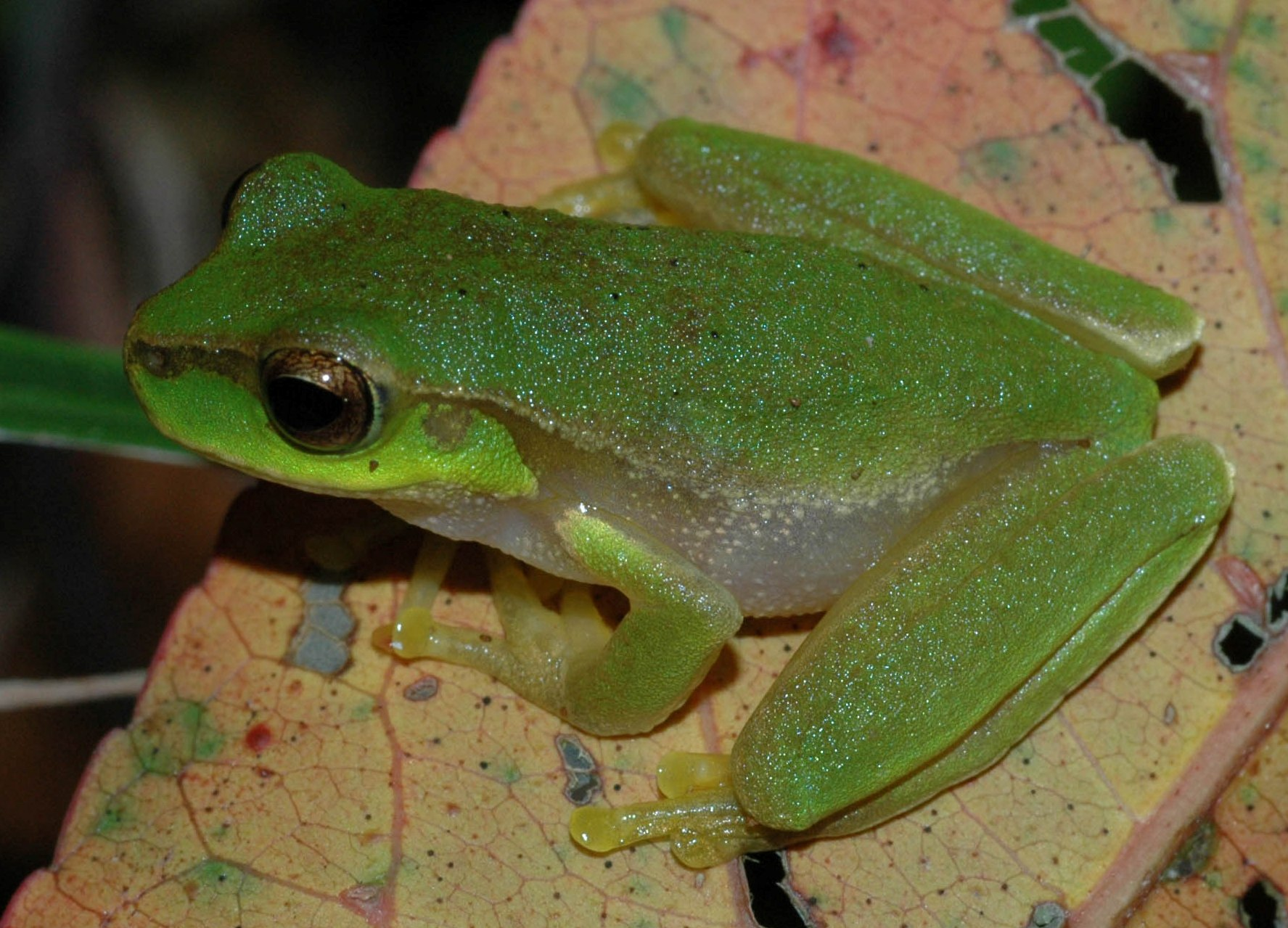
Pearson's tree frog

The park is a good location for the sighting of nocturnal animals such as the mountain brushtail possum, the ringtail possum, and the sugar glider. Due to land clearing in the hinterland district, Springbrook National Park has become a haven for birds. In total the park provides habitat for more than a hundred different bird species, including the yellow-tailed black cockatoo, rufous fantail, satin bowerbird, whipbird, and the Albert's lyrebird.

Long-finned eels are commonly found in the pools of the plateau and there are numerous reptiles such as the land mullet which is the world's largest species of skink, lace monitor, and amphibious species like the orange-eyed treefrog, and great barred frog. The rare Richmond birdwing butterfly, blue spiny crayfish, and glow-worms, the larvae of the fungus fly, are found in the park. Red-necked pademelons and koalas can also be seen.

== Recreation ==
Bush camping is not permitted. There is one camping area in Carricks Road.

== See also ==
- Protected areas of Queensland
