= Purling Brook Falls =

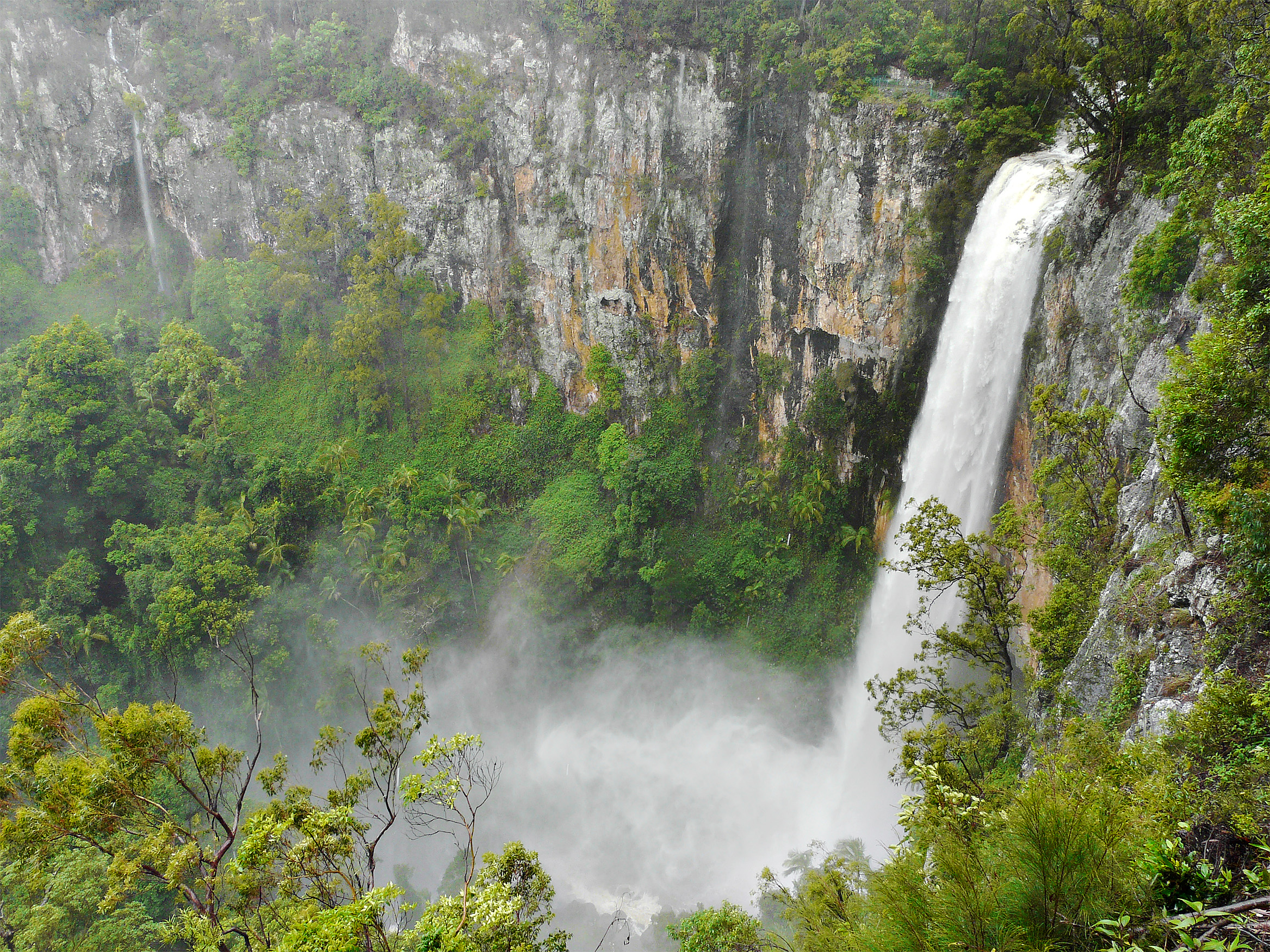
- Purling Brook Falls, Springbrook

- Location within Queensland
- Location: South East Queensland, Australia
- Coordinates: 28°11′00″S 153°16′00″E
- Type: Horsetail
- Total height: 100–106 metres (328–348 ft)
- Number of drops: 1
- Watercourse: Purling Brook

The Purling Brook Falls or sometimes incorrectly Purlingbrook Falls, a horsetail waterfall on the Purling Brook, is located on the Gold Coast in the UNESCO World Heritage–listed Gondwana Rainforests in the South East region of Queensland, Australia.

== Location and features ==
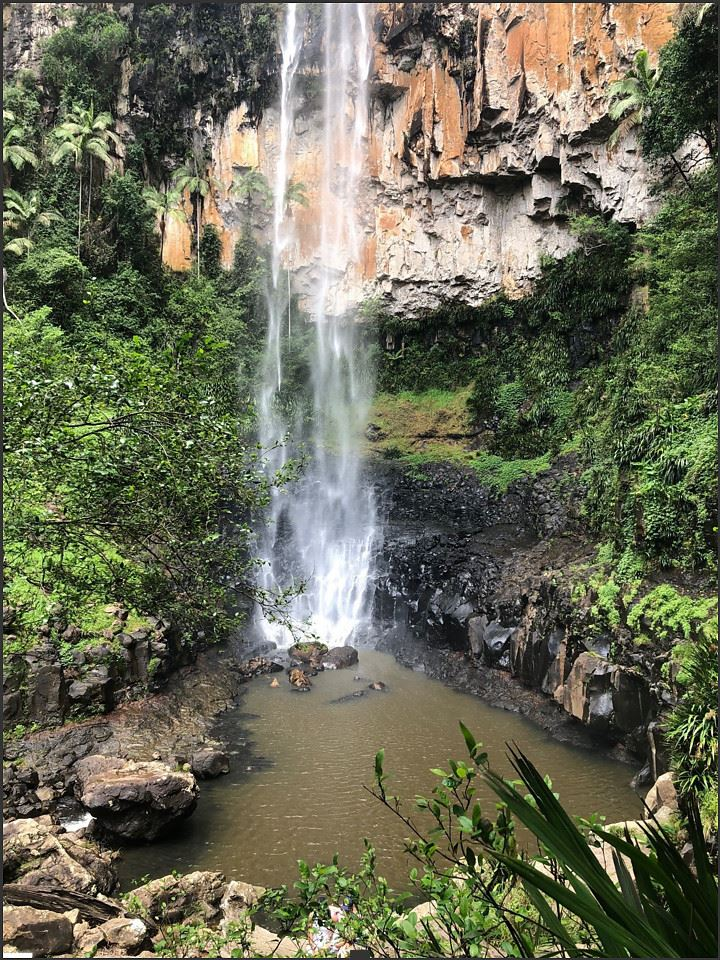
An eroded basalt cave formation at the bottom of Purling Brook Falls, 2022

The Purling Brook Falls are situated within the central section of Springbrook National Park as part of the Shield Volcano Group, at Springbrook which is part of the Gold Coast hinterland, south-west of Surfers Paradise.

After heavy rains the falling waters creates a spectacle that attracts large numbers of tourists. At these times the danger from falling rocks during landslides can be hazardous so barricades are erected to prevent walking along tracks that pass the base of the falls.

== See also ==
- List of waterfalls
- List of waterfalls in Australia
