= Bilbrough Falls =

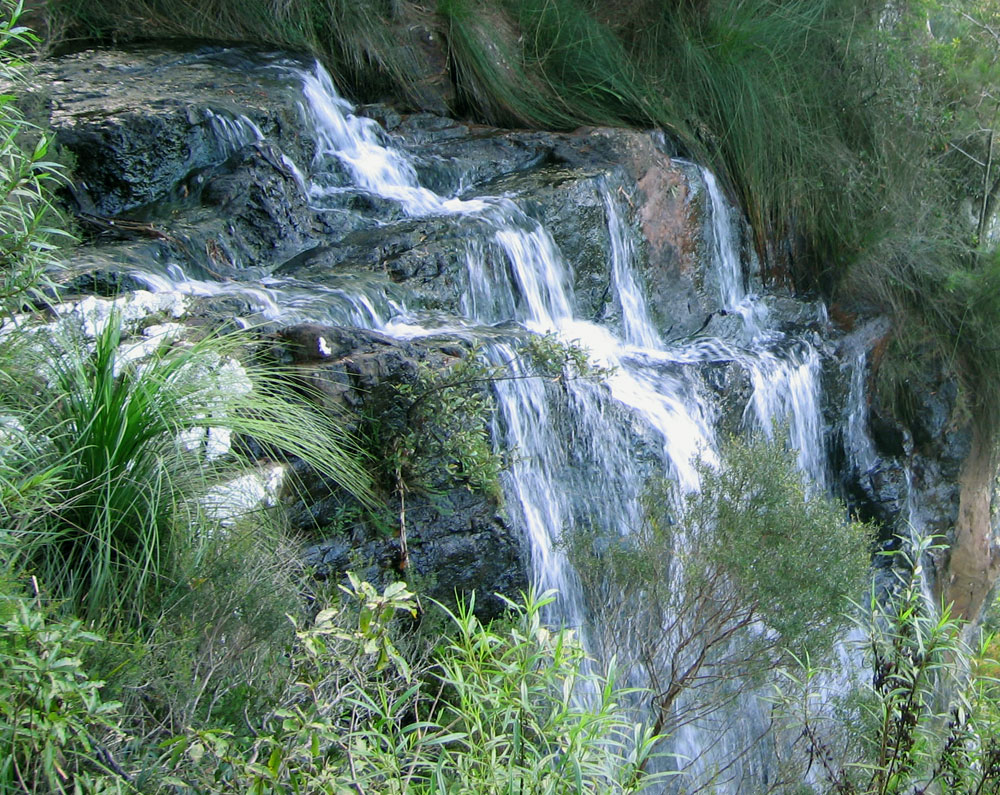
- Bilbrough Falls

- Location within Queensland
- Location: South East Queensland, Australia
- Coordinates: 28°13′22″S 153°17′06″E
- Type: Cascade

The Bilbrough Falls, also known as the Goomoolahra Falls, is a cascade waterfall that is located within the Springbrook National Park in the South East region of Queensland, Australia.

== Location and features ==
The falls are located in the Gold Coast hinterland district, near Springbrook.

At the base of the waterfall the moist conditions have created a good habitat for the giant spear lily.

== See also ==
- List of waterfalls
- List of waterfalls in Australia
