= Eucryphia jinksii =

Conservation status
- Endangered (NCA)

Scientific classification
- Kingdom: Plantae
- Clade: Tracheophytes
- Clade: Angiosperms
- Clade: Eudicots
- Clade: Rosids
- Order: Oxalidales
- Family: Cunoniaceae
- Genus: Eucryphia
- Species: E. jinksii

Binomial name
- Eucryphia jinksii P.I.Forst.

Species of tree

Eucryphia jinksii, the Springbrook leatherwood, is a species of rare rainforest trees found in Queensland and New South Wales, Australia, of the plant family Cunoniaceae.

They grow naturally to 30m tall yet were discovered as a new species only in 1994 by David Jinks.

Eucryphia jinksii’s endemic, very restricted and threatened distribution has obtained the conservation status of "endangered", officially listed in the regulation current as of 27 September 2013, of the Queensland government legislation, the Nature Conservation Act 1992.

== Distribution and habitat ==
It is known from a single creek catchment in Warm Temperate Rainforest on the Springbrook Plateau. Another stand has been discovered growing not as trees but as a thicket of multi stemmed shrubs on a wind sheared clifftop also in the Springbrook Area. It grows in New South Wales at Numinbah Nature Reserve, on the Mount Warning caldera.

== Description ==
E. jinksii trees have pale lichen covered bark typical of many species in the Warm Temperate Rainforests. Often a ring of coppice shoots surrounds the base of an adult tree, coppice and seedling leaves have 5-7 leaflets, while adult leaves have 1–3.

Flowers are cream with four petals and numerous stamens. Beehives near other species of Eucryphia make a famous rich honey known as Leatherwood Honey this species has considerable potential for honey production.

Fruits are small brown capsules with multiple segments and small seeds.
