= Numinbah Nature Reserve =

Protected area in New South Wales, Australia

- IUCN category Ia (strict nature reserve)
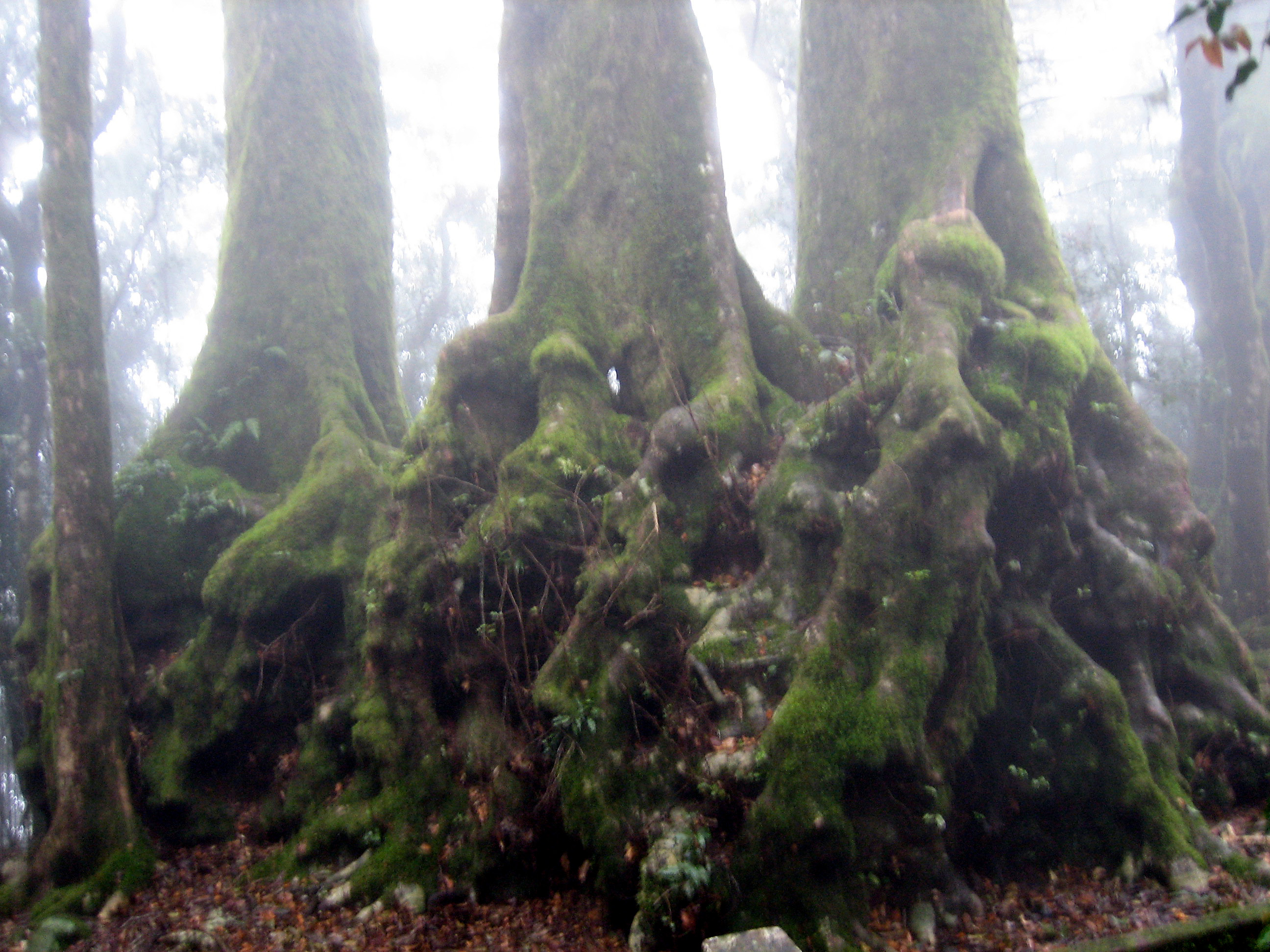
- Antarctic beech at Numinbah Nature Reserve

- Location within New South Wales
- Location: New South Wales
- Nearest city: Springbrook, Queensland
- Coordinates: 28°15′S 153°16′E
- Area: 8.58 km^{2} (3.31 sq mi)
- Established: December 1981
- Governing body: NSW National Parks and Wildlife Service
- Website: Official website

Numinbah Nature Reserve is a protected nature reserve in the Northern Rivers region of New South Wales, in eastern Australia. The reserve was gazetted in December 1981. A further addition was made in 1989 to make the reserve its current area of 858 hectares (2,120 acres). The reserve is situated northeast of the rural locality of Numinbah and south of the Queensland town of Springbrook and defines part of the state border between New South Wales and Queensland.

The reserve is part of the Mount Warning/Tweed caldera, situated in the Border Ranges, and is part of the Shield Volcano group of the UNESCO World Heritage–listed Gondwana Rainforests of Australia inscribed in 1986 and added to the Australian National Heritage List in 2007. It is also part of the Scenic Rim Important Bird Area, identified as such by BirdLife International because of its importance in the conservation of several species of threatened birds.

== Description ==
The area includes an escarpment rising to over 1,000 metres (3,300 ft) above sea level that forms part of the Queensland/New South Wales border. Below the cliffs are extensive subtropical rainforests. The reserve is intended to be a place where the flora and fauna are free of interference from humans, domestic animals and feral pests. The southern edges are bounded by private landholdings.

=== Vegetation ===
The vegetation is primarily sub-tropical rainforest with some wet sclerophyll forest. A group of Antarctic beech are at their northernmost limit of natural distribution. The beech trees are in an area of one hectare, within a cool temperate rainforest stand of 2.9 hectares at Best-of-all Lookout in Numinbah Nature Reserve. Located in a high rainfall area with frequent mist. Many of the trees are in the form of a depauperate thicket, with stems arising from massive, gnarled, above-ground roots. An often photographed, triple-stemmed tree is situated in the reserve, just south of the state border. This plant is considered to be of a great age.

The rare rainforest tree Springbrook leatherwood occurs in this reserve. The subtropical rainforest at the base of the rhyolite cliffs is considered outstanding among the rainforests of Australia. This rainforest is particularly notable at the heads of Pat Smiths Creek, Crystal Creek, and Couchy Creek. Soils are enriched with basalt on a shelf below the Springbrook plateau. Many rare species of plants and unusually tall trees are present beside massive fallen rhyolite blocks. Climbing plants have been recorded at a diameter of one metre. The rainforest botanist A.G.Floyd has recorded the following species as record sizes in this nature reserve; black booyong, purple cherry, red lilly pilly, rose marara and black bean.

== See also ==
- Protected areas of New South Wales
