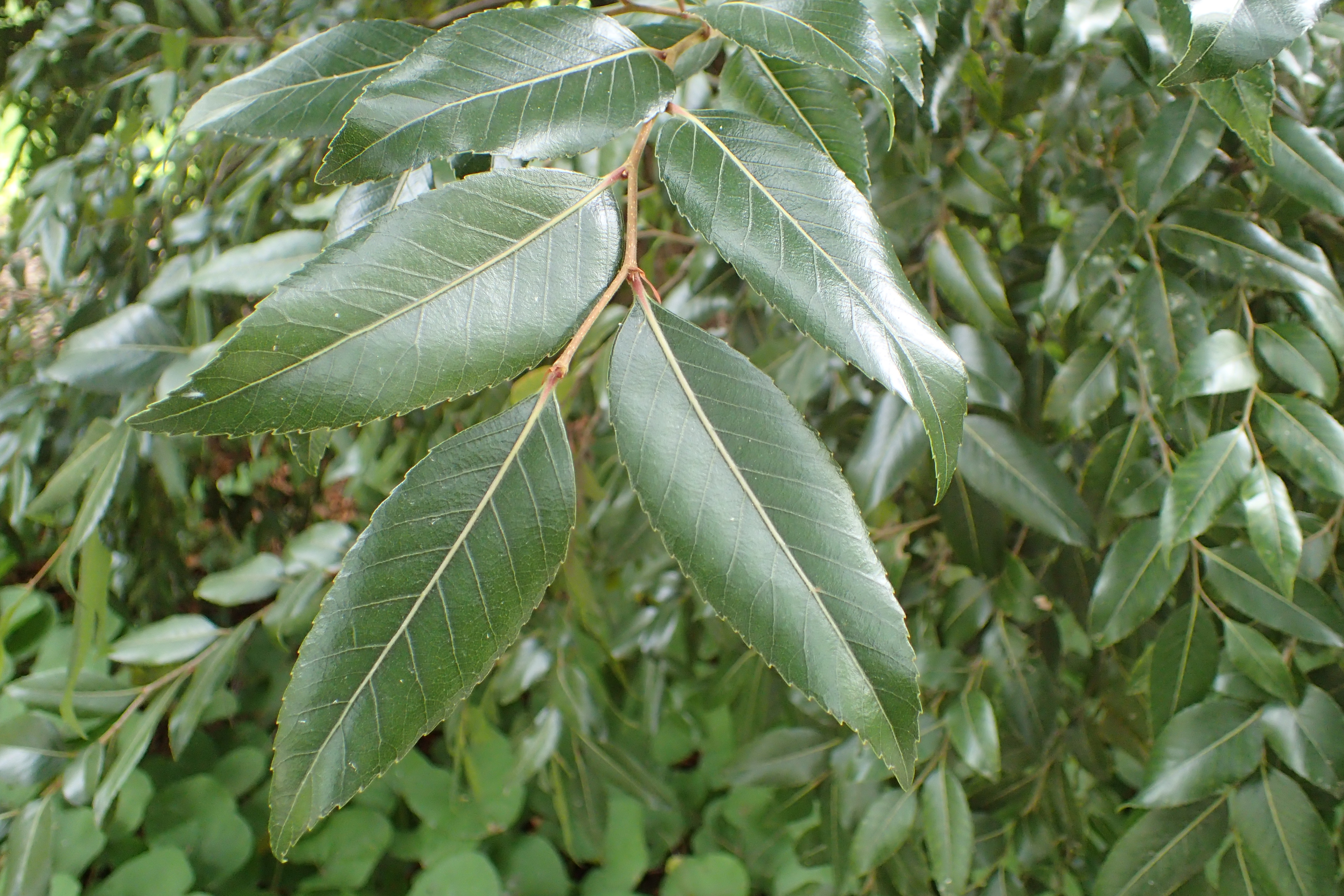
- New South Wales, Australia

Conservation status
- Vulnerable (IUCN 3.1)

Scientific classification
- Kingdom: Plantae
- Clade: Tracheophytes
- Clade: Angiosperms
- Clade: Eudicots
- Clade: Rosids
- Order: Fagales
- Family: Nothofagaceae
- Genus: Nothofagus
- Subgenus: Nothofagus subg. Lophozonia
- Species: N. moorei

Binomial name
- Nothofagus moorei (F.Muell.) Krasser

Synonyms
- Fagus moorei F.Muell.; Lophozonia moorei (F.Muell.) Heenan & Smissen; Fagus carronii C.Moore

= Nothofagus moorei =

Antarctic beech

Species of tree

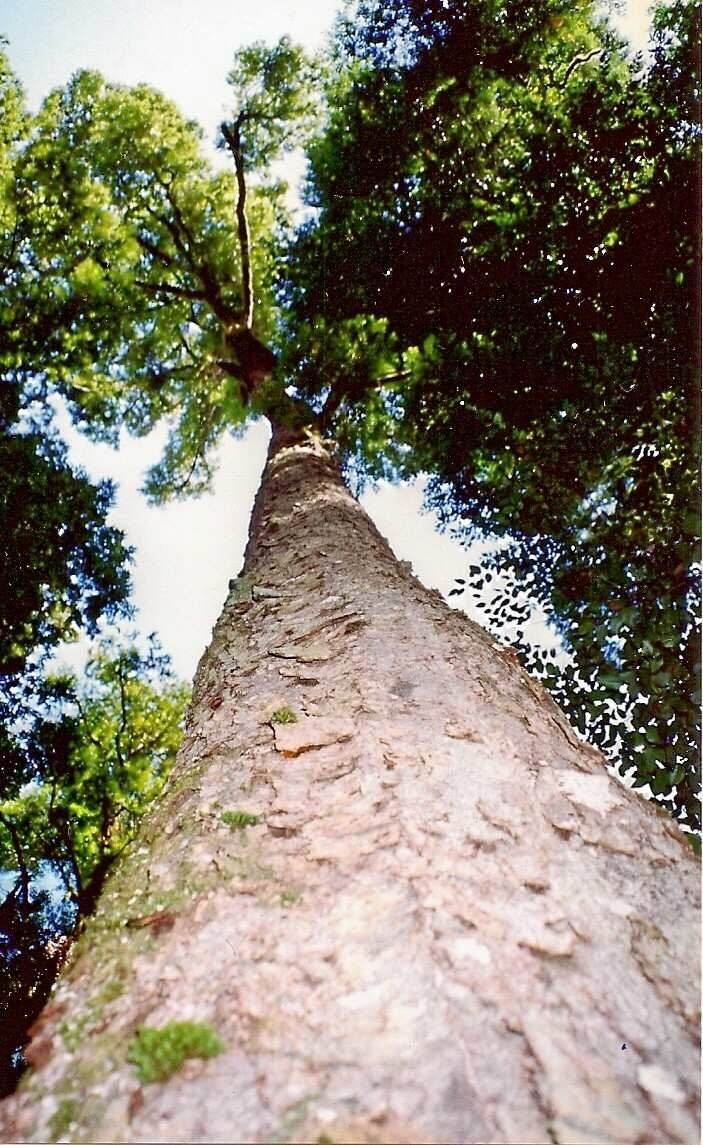
Large Antarctic beech at Cobark Park, Barrington Tops, 50 metres tall

Nothofagus moorei, commonly known as Antarctic beech, is a species of flowering plant in the family Nothofagaceae that is endemic to high elevation areas of eastern Australia. It is a tree, with simple leathery, glossy, egg-shaped to lance-shaped leaves.

== Description ==
Nothofagus moorei is a tree that typically grows to a height of up to 50 m (160 ft), often with a massive trunk up to 1.5 m (4 ft 11 in) in diameter, with suckers at the base. The leaves are simple, more or less egg-shaped to elliptic or lance-shaped, mostly 30–100 mm (1.2–3.9 in) long, glossy, leathery and more or less glabrous on a petiole 3–5 mm (0.12–0.20 in) long. New leaves in spring are reddish-brown to red. Male flowers are in rounded or flattened clusters about 10 mm (0.39 in) in diameter, with up to three flowers with a total of 15 to 40 stamens surrounded by 8 to 12 bracts, forming a cup-shaped structure. Female flowers are in oval clusters of three about 5 mm (0.20 in) long, and are more or less sessile, surrounded by an involucre of bracts. Flowering occurs in spring, but not every year, and the fruit is a prickly cupule 8–10 mm (0.31–0.39 in), containing one or two nuts.

== Taxonomy ==
Nothofagus moorei was first formally described in 1866 by Ferdinand von Mueller who gave it the name Fagus moorei in his Fragmenta Phytographiae Australiae, from material collected near the Bellinger and Macleay Rivers by Charles Moore. In 1896, Fridolin Krasser transferred the species to Nothofagus as N. moorei. The specific epithet (moorei) honours the collector of the type specimens.

Within the genus, it is part of a lineage of three evergreen species, the other two being silver beech (N. menziesii) of New Zealand and myrtle beech (N. cunninghamii) of Tasmania and Victoria.

== Distribution and habitat ==
Antarctic beech grows in cool temperate rainforests from the Barrington Tops plateau in New South Wales, north to the Lamington Plateau and Springbrook Plateau, in southern Queensland, between altitudes of 480 m and 1550 m. It occurs in temperate to cool temperatures and with occasional snowfalls. Antarctic beech achieves its finest development at Werrikimbe National Park and Mount Banda Banda.

=== Comboyne ===
There are four known populations of the Antarctic beech in the Comboyne area of New South Wales. In 1925, the botanist E.C. Chisholm wrote that the Antarctic Beech at Comboyne was "extremely rare, although many trees were undoubtedly destroyed during clearing." The Comboyne Plateau was mostly cleared between 1900 and 1925.

The Comboyne plateau is a scarp-bounded paleoplain located between the Mid North Coast of New South Wales and the Great Dividing Range. Miocene basalts overlie much of the plateau, creating relatively fertile red/brown soils.

In the southern third of the plateau are underlying Triassic sediments of the Lorne basin. The plateau has a wet, sub tropical climate, though subject to frost and occasional snow.

The population at Comboyne was considered likely to be extinct by the scientific community, until published in 1994 by the botanists Bale and Williams. This community of trees regenerates well from seed and is notably vagile, with many young plants.

It is the only other lowland (as low as 570 metres) population known, with those found near Dorrigo, to the north. The rainforest botanist Alexander Floyd considers the Comboyne examples of the Antarctic Beech, as part of the cool temperate sub type 49, of the rainforests of New South Wales.

== History ==
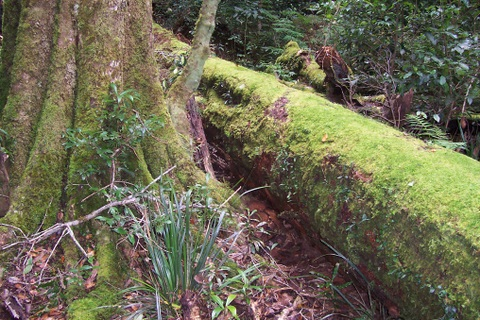
Antarctic beech at Mount Banda Banda

At one time it was assumed that the Eastern Australian populations of this tree could not reproduce in present-day conditions, except by suckering (asexual reproduction), being remnant forest from a cooler time. It has since been shown that sexual reproduction may occur, but distribution in cool, isolated high-altitude environments at temperate and tropical latitudes is consistent with the theory that the species was more prolific in a cooler age. The pattern of distribution around the southern Pacific Ocean rim dates the dissemination of the genus to the time when Antarctica, Australia and South America were connected, the theoretical common land-mass referred to as Gondwana.

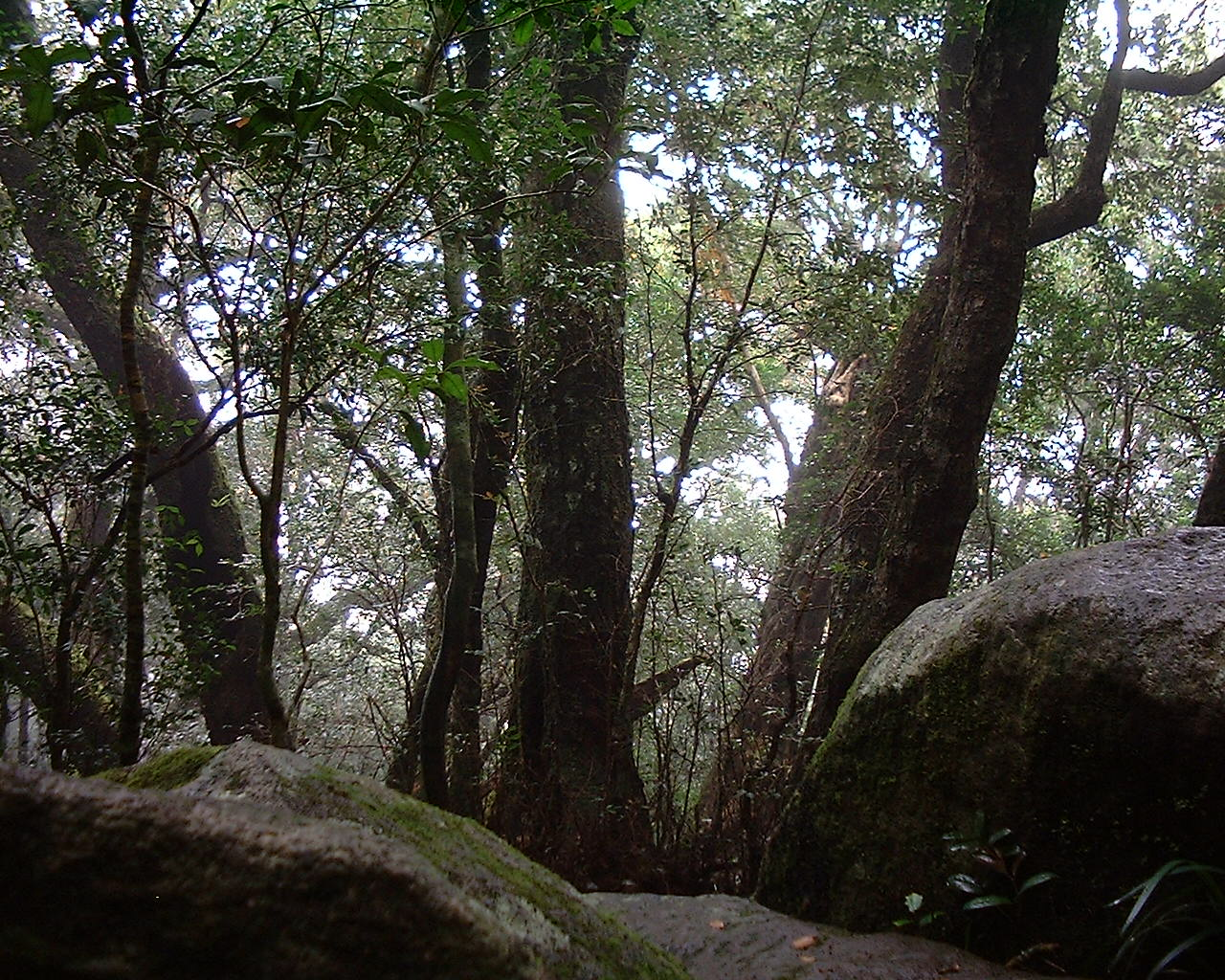
Antarctic beech trees in Numinbah Nature Reserve

It is an ornamental tree and cultivated specimens tolerate −7 °C (19 °F), though wild plants growing on Barrington Tops have withstood record low temperatures of −17 °C (1 °F), no source provenance have been selected from there and other mountains, highlands or plateaus for cultivation.

== Conservation status ==
Nothofagus moorei is listed as "vulnerable" by the IUCN and as of "least concern" under the Queensland Government Nature Conservation Act 1992.

NB: Nothofagus antarctica, native to southern Chile and Argentina, is also referred to as "Antarctic beech".
