= Wills Developmental Road =

Road in Queensland, Australia

Wills Developmental Road Queensland
- Wills Developmental Road (green and black)

General information
- Type: Rural road
- Length: 500 km (311 mi)
- Route number(s): State Route 84

Major junctions
- South-east end: Flinders Highway, Julia Creek
- North-west end: Burketown

Location(s)
- Major settlements: Gregory

The Wills Developmental Road is a road in north-west Queensland running between Julia Creek and Burketown. As of 2016 it is sealed with a total length of 500 kilometres (310 mi). There are no major towns along the entire route, but fuel and supplies are available at the Burke and Wills Roadhouse at Four Ways, and also at Gregory. The Wills Developmental Road joins the Burke Developmental Road for approximately 1.2 kilometres, avoiding a direct crossroads at their intersection. Two major rivers are crossed by the Wills Developmental Road en route, the Cloncurry and the Leichhardt.

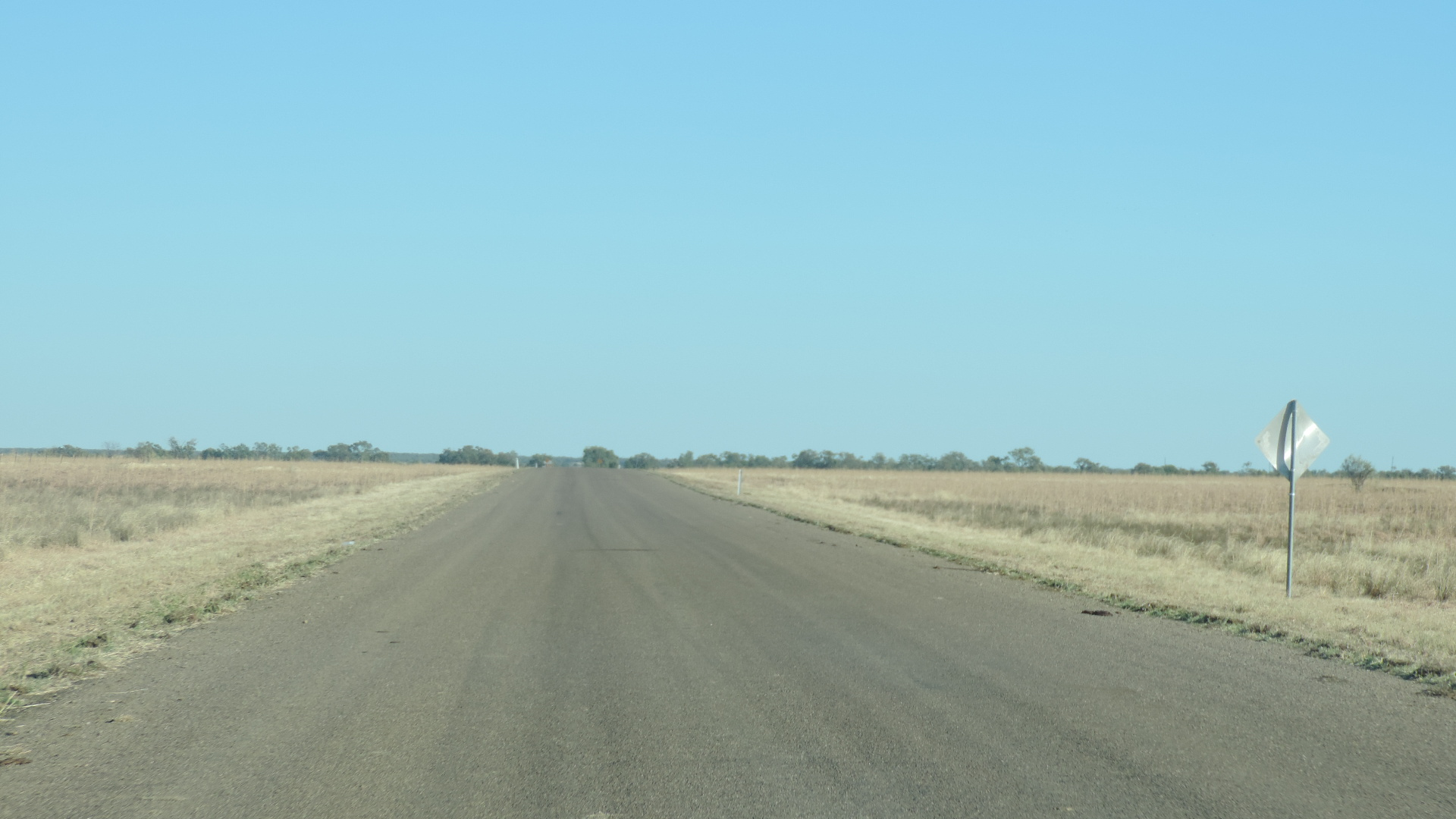

Wills Developmental Road, Taldora, Gulf Country, June 2019

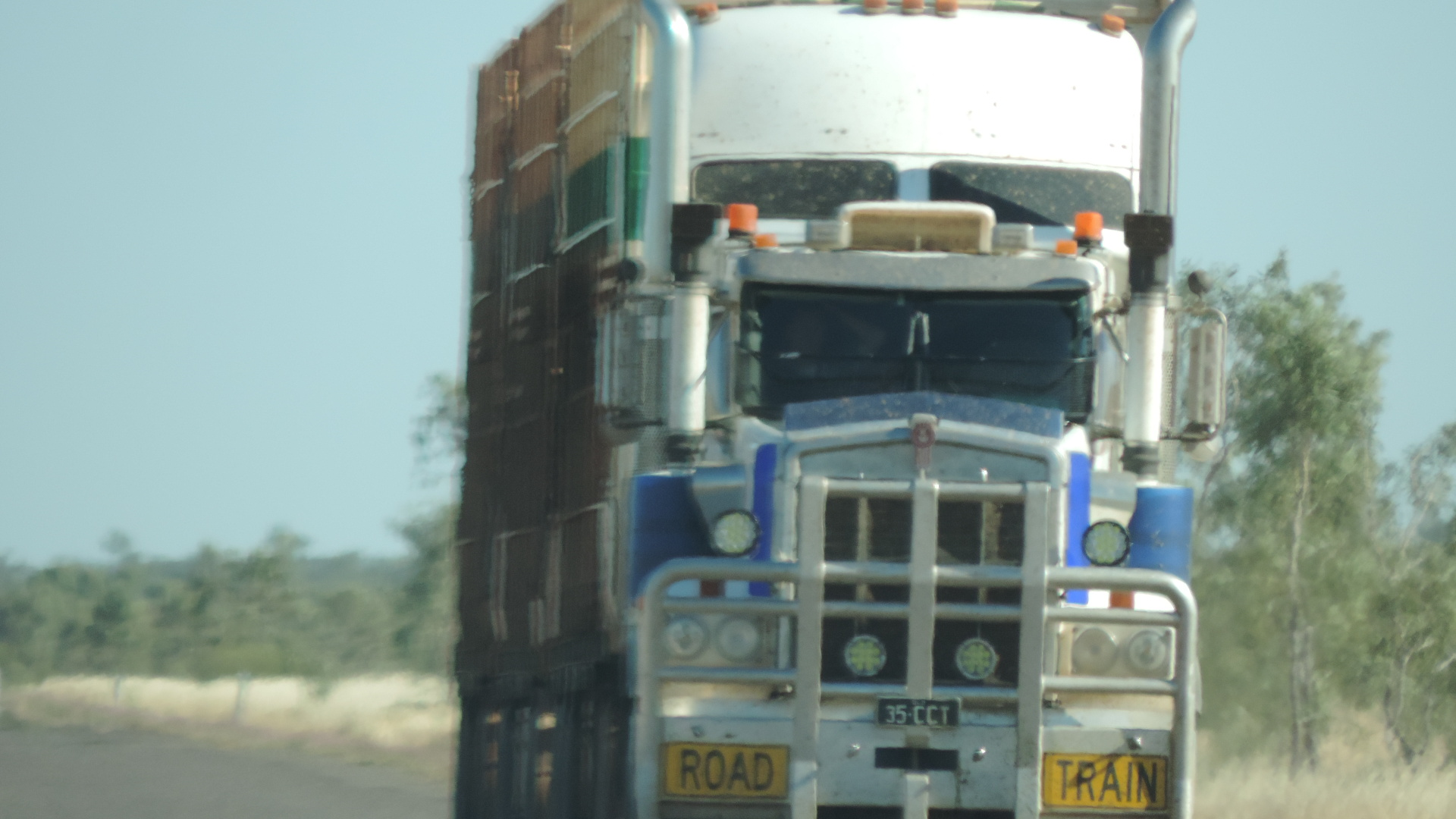

Road train on the Wills Developmental Road, Four Ways, June 2019

== Major intersections ==
LGA	Location	km	mi	Destinations	Notes
McKinlay	Julia Creek	0	0.0	Flinders Highway (State Route A6) – west – Cloncurry / east – Richmond	Southern end of Wills Developmental Road (State Route 84)
Cloncurry	Four Ways	233	145	Burke Developmental Road (National Route 83) – north – Normanton / south – Cloncurry	Southern concurrency terminus with Burke Developmental Road
Cloncurry	Four Ways	234	145	Burke Developmental Road (National Route 83) – north – Normanton	Northern concurrency terminus with Burke Developmental Road
Burke	Gregory	380	240	Gregory Downs Camooweal Road (State Route 76) – south – Camooweal	
Burke	Nicholson	475	295	Doomadgee Road (National Route 1) – west – Doomadgee/ northeast – Burketown	Southern concurrency terminus with National Route 1
Burke	Burketown	500	310	Nardoo Burketown Road (National Route 1) – south, then east – Normanton	Northern concurrency terminus with National Route 1. Northern end of Wills Developmental Road.
1.000 mi = 1.609 km; 1.000 km = 0.621 mi: Concurrency terminus

== See also ==
- Highways in Australia
- List of highways in Queensland
- Gulf Developmental Road
