= Landsborough Tree =

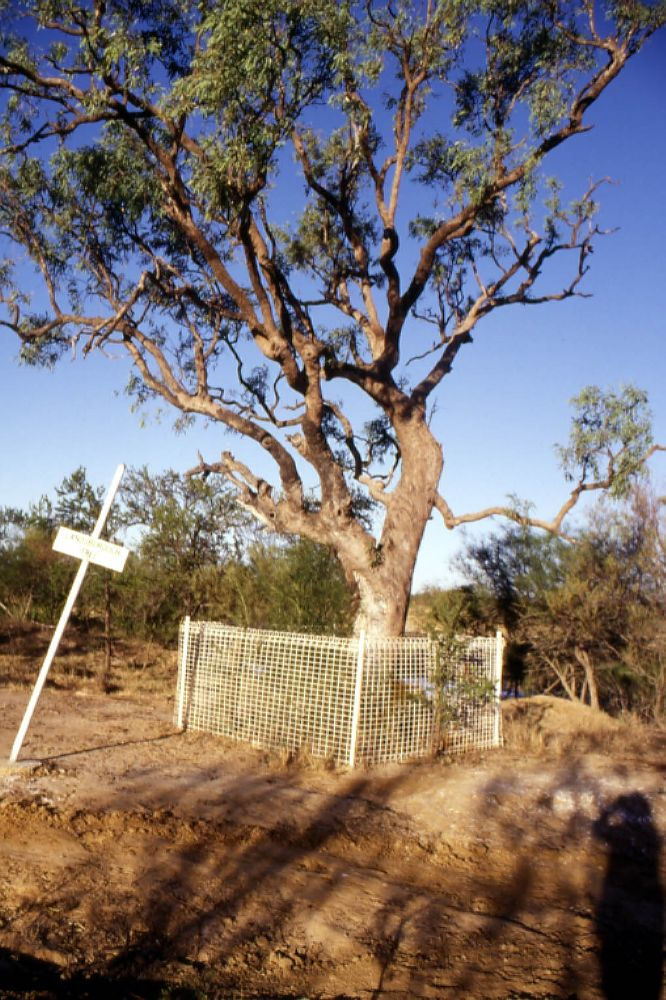
- Landsborough Tree (before it was burned down)

- Location within Queensland Location within Australia
- 17.7391°S 139.5648°E
- Location: Burketown, Shire of Burke, Queensland, Australia

Queensland Heritage Register
- Official name: Landsborough Tree
- Type: state heritage (landscape)
- Designated: 21 August 1992
- Reference no.: 600374
- Significant period: 1862–2002

Landsborough Tree is a heritage-listed tree at Burketown, Shire of Burke, Queensland, Australia. It was added to the Queensland Heritage Register on 21 August 1992.

== History ==
The Landsborough Tree marks the site by the Albert River where explorer William Landsborough established a depot camp while searching for the missing Burke and Wills expedition in 1862. He buried supplies near the eucalypt tree in case the explorers should come up upon it; he carved the word "Dig" into the tree.

The brig Firefly used in the search was abandoned nearby on the riverbank.

In December 2002, vandals set the tree alight, causing the trunk to fall over. In 2007, it was described as "nothing but a small charred stump", but by June 2009 there was a sapling "replanted" alongside the dead tree to replace it.
