= Lawn Hill, Queensland =

Lawn Hill
- Suburb
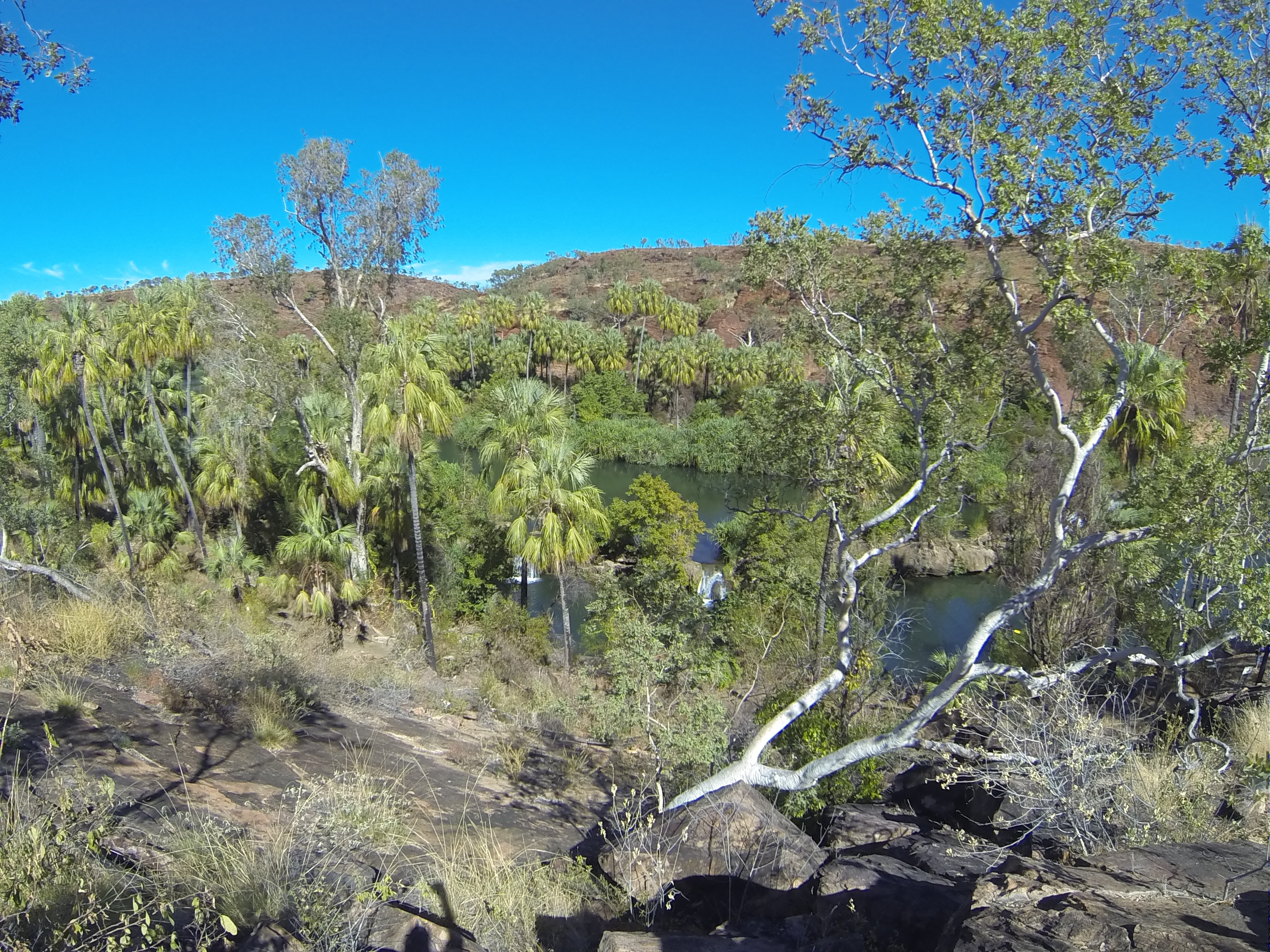
- Lawn Hill Gorge

- Interactive map of Lawn Hill
- Coordinates: 18.9544°S 138.4358°E
- Country: Australia
- State: Queensland
- LGAs: Shire of Burke; City of Mount Isa
- Location: 208 km (129 mi) SW of Burketown; 348 km (216 mi) NNW of Mount Isa; 1,118 km (695 mi) W of Townsville; 2,100 km (1,300 mi) NW of Brisbane

Government
  - State electorate: Traeger
  - Federal division: Kennedy

Area
  - Total: 14,606.5 km^{2} (5,639.6 sq mi)

Population
  - Total: 63 (2021 census)
  - Density: 0.00431/km^{2} (0.01117/sq mi)
- Time zone: UTC+10:00 (AEST)
- Postcode: 4825
Suburbs around Lawn Hill
Nicholson	Doomadgee	Nicholson
Northern Territory	Lawn Hill	Gregory
Northern Territory	Camooweal	Gunpowder

Lawn Hill is an outback locality split between the Shire of Burke and the City of Mount Isa in Queensland, Australia. The locality is on the Queensland border with the Northern Territory. In the 2021 census, Lawn Hill had a population of 63 people.

== Geography ==
The locality is bounded to the west by the Northern Territory. Being over 14,606 square kilometres (5,639 sq mi), it has a variety of terrain.

Lawn Hill has the following ranges:

- Constance Range (18.6223°S 138.4408°E)
- Edith Range (18.5036°S 138.5125°E
- Littles Range (18.6013°S 138.0331°E)
- Smiths Range (19.1304°S 138.8874°E)

and mountains:

- Fort William (18.6547°S 138.5557°E) 180 metres (590 ft)
- Mount Caroline (18.4971°S 138.6498°E) 245 metres (804 ft)
- Mount Oscar (18.2935°S 138.5451°E) 115 metres (377 ft)
- Mount Steiglitz (18.4071°S 138.5462°E) 81 metres (266 ft)
- Napoleon Bonnet (18.5253°S 138.7643°E) 186 metres (610 ft)
- Point Watson (18.4305°S 138.4805°E) 211 metres (692 ft)
- Mount Kay (18.9495°S 138.7856°E) 270 metres (890 ft)
- Verdon Rock (18.9833°S 138.6666°E) 150 metres (490 ft)

It also has plains:

- Burenda Plain (19.05°S 138.7833°E)
- Rankins Plain (18.9666°S 138.9°E)
- Wangunda Plain(18.9166°S 138.8666°E)

Mended Hill is a neighbourhood (18.75°S 138.5833°E).

Pitchfork Camp is a neighbourhood (18.3°S 138.6333°E).

A large part of the locality from the west through to the south is within the Boodjamulla National Park and the associated Lawn Hill Resources Reserves.

== History ==
Waanyi (also known as Wanyi, Wanyee, Wanee, Waangyee, Wonyee, Garawa, and Wanji) is an Australian Aboriginal language of the Gulf Country. The language region includes the western parts of Lawn Hill Creek and Nicholson River, from about the boundary between the Northern Territory and Queensland, westwards towards Alexandria station, Doomadgee, and Nicholson River. It includes the local government area of the Aboriginal Shire of Doomadgee.

Yulluna (also known as Yalarnga, Yalarrnga, Jalanga, Jalannga, Wonganja, Gunggalida, and Jokula) is an Australian Aboriginal language. The Yulluna language region includes the local government boundaries of the Shire of Cloncurry and other areas near the Gulf of Carpentaria.

Smiths Range was named by explorer William Landsborough on 28 November 1861 during his expedition searching for Burke and Wills.

The locality is named after the Boodjamulla National Park, which was previously known as the Lawn Hill National Park, which was in turn named after Lawn Hill Station, a pastoral property.

Lawn Hill Gorge was previously part of Lawn Hill pastoral station. Lawn Hill National Park was established to protect the gorge in December 1984. The national park was expanded in March 1992 to include Riversleigh World Heritage Area (formerly part of Riversleigh pastoral station).

== Demographics ==
In the 2011 census, Lawn Hill and surrounding localities recorded a population of 381 people.

In the 2016 census, Lawn Hill had a population of 19 people.

In the 2021 census, Lawn Hill had a population of 63 people.

== Economy ==
There are a number of homesteads in the locality, including:

- Adels Grove (18.6897°S 138.5298°E)
- Lawn Hill (18.5803°S 138.5817°E)
- Old Herbert Vale (18.9515°S 138.0533°E)
- Riversleigh (19.0283°S 138.7409°E)

== Education ==
Students who live in the northernmost parts of the locality can attend Doomadgee State School (Early Childhood - Year 10) in neighbouring Doomadgee to the north, but the school would be too distant for students in other parts of the locality. There is no nearby school offering education to Year 12. The alternatives are distance education and boarding school.

== Amenities ==
Regular services by the Uniting Church in Australia are held at the campfire at Adels Grove. These are provided by the McKay Patrol, an aerial service of the Uniting Church in Australia that operates out of Cloncurry. Supported by other denominations, the McKay Patrol operates a Cessna 182Q aeroplane to provide spiritual and practical help to people living in remote areas in the north-west of Queensland and the eastern Tablelands of the Northern Territory, an area of approximately 625,000 square kilometres (241,000 sq mi) with a population of less than 10,000 people.

== Attractions ==
Boodjamulla National Park is a popular attraction with spectacular gorges, sandstone ranges and fossils. Lawn Hill Creek has created Lawn Hill Gorge which is filled with freshwater from springs from the limestone plateau to the west. The gorge is an oasis of water and lush vegetation which attracts the wildlife and is surrounded by sandstone cliffs.

The Riversleigh World Heritage Area is within the south-east of the national park. It contains fossils from the late Oligocene period, dating back 25 million years. Its world heritage listing reflects that it is one of the most significant fossil deposits in the world, particularly for mammal fossils from Gondwana prior to its separation from other land masses. Fossils found there include crocodiles, lizards, turtles, pythons, fish, snails, and birds.

Indarri Falls Lookout is at 18.7078°S 138.4825°E.

== See also ==
- Frank Hann
