= Leioproctus rutiliventris =

Scientific classification
- Kingdom: Animalia
- Phylum: Arthropoda
- Clade: Pancrustacea
- Class: Insecta
- Order: Hymenoptera
- Family: Colletidae
- Genus: Leioproctus
- Species: L. rutiliventris

Binomial name
- Leioproctus rutiliventris Maynard 2013

Species of bee

Leioproctus rutiliventris, or Leioproctus (Fragocolletes) rutiliventris, is a species of bee in the family Colletidae and subfamily Colletinae. It is endemic to Australia. It was described by Australian entomologist Glynn Maynard in 2013.

== Etymology ==
The specific epithet rutiliventris (Latin: "red" + "abdomen") refers to the metasoma.

== Description ==
Male body length is about 6 mm. Integumental colouration is mainly black, with orange on the metasoma. The hair is mostly white.

== Distribution and habitat ==
The species occurs in north-western Queensland. The type locality is Knob Lagoon, 42 km north-west of Doomadgee Mission.

== Behaviour ==
The adults are flying mellivores.
