= Cyclone Audrey =

Tropical cyclone in Australia and New Zealand in 1964

Tropical Cyclone Audrey
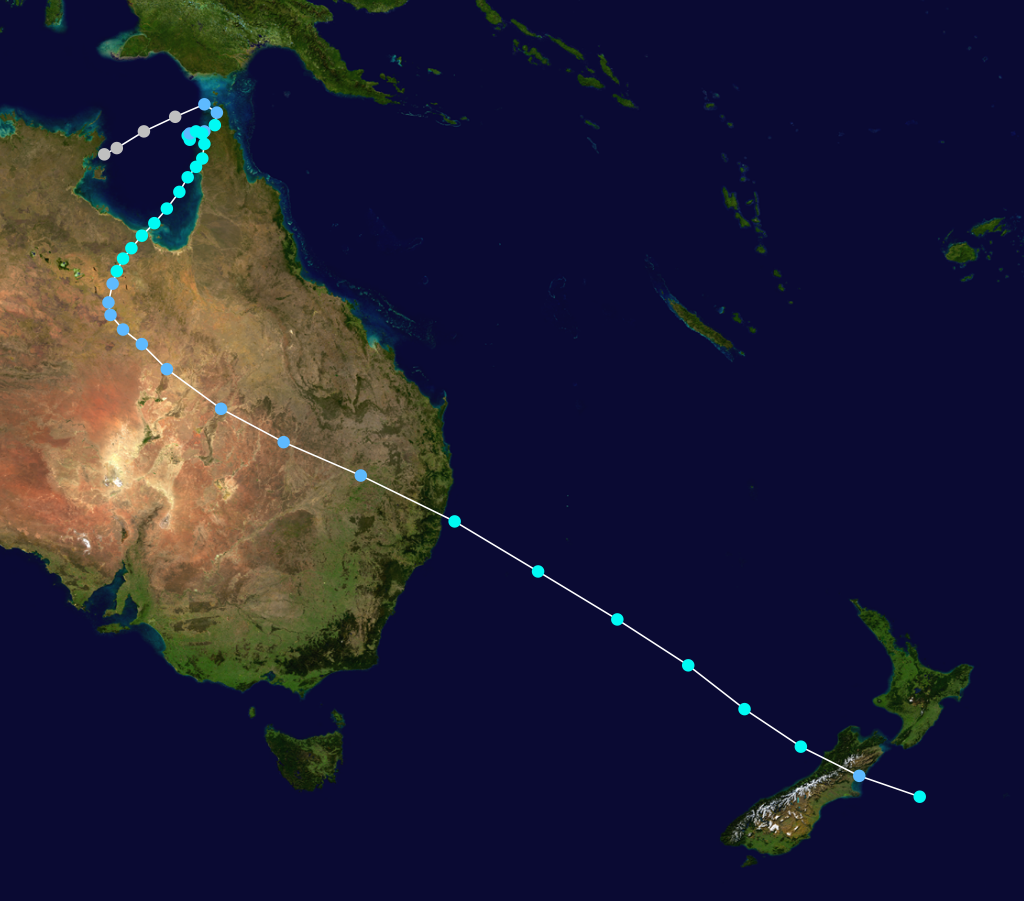
- Track maps of Tropical Cyclone Audrey

Meteorological history
- Formed: 6 January 1964
- Extratropical: 14 January
- Dissipated: 16 January 1964

Category 2 tropical cyclone
- 10-minute sustained (BOM)
- Highest winds: 100 km/h (65 mph)
- Lowest pressure: 984 hPa (mbar); 29.06 inHg

Overall effects
- Fatalities: None reported
- Damage: £150,000
- Areas affected: Northern Territory, Queensland, New South Wales, New Zealand
- Part of the 1963–64 Australian region cyclone season

Tropical Cyclone Audrey, also referred to by other media as Little Audrey, was a strong tropical cyclone that caused flooding and destruction on its path, from Queensland to New South Wales during early-to-mid January 1964. Audrey was first noted as a developing disturbance to the west of Moa Island in the Gulf of Carpentaria on January 7; however, the system formed a day prior. It moved east, passing to the north of Thursday Island before heading southeast, making a clockwise loop while making landfall in the Cape York Peninsula before strengthening to a Category 1 tropical cyclone, with the Bureau of Meteorology naming it Audrey. It moved south-southwestwards while slowly intensifying, becoming a Category 2 tropical cyclone before making landfall at Mornington Island on January 11. Land interaction degraded Audrey; however, it remained below severe tropical cyclone intensity until it made a second landfall on Gangalidda on that day before weakening inland. However, the present-day brown ocean effect prevented Audrey from weakening as it progressed through the eastern Northern Territory before degrading to a Category 1 tropical cyclone as it turned southeastwards, drifting through southern Queensland before entering New South Wales on the afternoon of January 14 as it slowed down. Extratropical transition took place as Audrey restrengthened to a Category 2 tropical cyclone while drifting southeastwards, becoming fully extratropical as it emerged through the Coral Sea near Coffs Harbour on that day. It then brushed North Island of New Zealand as an extratropical storm before dissipating on January 16 in the Southern Pacific Ocean.

Torrential rainfall and gusty winds up to 60 miles per hour were experienced in southern Queensland and northern New South Wales as Audrey takes a southward track. Hundreds of individuals evacuated as many rivers overflowed. Many sheep and cattle were killed, while roads were submerged in floodwaters. No reports of damages were reported in North Island in New Zealand, however. The damages from Audrey were described as extensive, and no fatalities were reported from the storm.

== Meteorological history ==
The formation of Audrey started on the Gulf of Carpentaria, nearly 45 kilometres to the east-southeast of Gurkawuy in the East Arnhem. The observation on the disturbance remained sparse due to the lack of weather stations until at 00:00 UTC on January 7, when a meteorological observation post, possibly near the Thursday Island started to tracked the system. This observation was also reported in the tropical cyclone report published by the Bureau of Meteorology about Audrey. It passed to the north of the island before heading southeastwards. It then made landfall to the southeast of Crab Island on that day. It then accelerated while paralleling the Cape York Peninsula before heading south-southwestwards, exiting the coast near Nomenade Creek, also on that day. Early the next day, the disturbance began to execute a clockwise loop as it reentered the Gulf of Carpentaria from the Arafura Sea. On January 9, the system moved south-southeastwards before taking another landfall near Cullen Point that day before emerging on the Port Musgrave. It passed near Mapoon before parallelling the peninsula as the motion of the disturbance accelerated for the second time. It turned south-southwestwards that day before passing near Aurukun, also that day. Upon reemerging on the gulf for the third time, the Bureau of Meteorology named the system Audrey as it started to strengthen further. Intensification of the system continued, with Audrey strengthening to a Category 2 tropical cyclone as it accelerated through the coast of Northern Queensland. On January 11, the system passed near the Mornington Island, where the weather station in the area recorded a minimum barometric pressure of 984 hPa and a maximum wind speed of 100 km/h (65 mph) in ten-minute means. The report on the cyclone showed weakening prior to that day, possibly due to the land interaction to the Northern Queensland. It made landfall on that day near Gangalidda, Queensland before weakening further to a Category 1 tropical cyclone. However, the brown ocean effect possibly prevented Audrey from weakening significantly as it entered Northern Territory on the next day before curving southeastwards, re-entering Queensland on January 13 before starting extratropical transition on the next day as it moved through the border of New South Wales before entering the area. Audrey restrengthened to an equivalent of a Category 2 tropical cyclone on the next day despite the transition before becoming fully extratropical as it moved ashore in the Tasman Sea near the Coffs Harbour, also that day. Ex-Audrey then accelerated on the next day before brushing the North Island of New Zealand with gale-force winds before dissipating on 00:00 UTC of January 16 as it entered the Southern Pacific Ocean.

== Impact ==
Audrey caused no deaths throughout its path, but the cyclone left extensive damages, in some parts of Queensland and New South Wales. No reports of damage and deaths were reported on New Zealand's North Island. Mornington Island recorded 200mm amount of rainfall from January 11 to 13, while Bamaga had the highest amount, standing at 492mm in four days. A 1.6m storm surge was seen on the seas off Karumba on January 11.

In the town of Goondiwindi, some houses lost their roofings and a railroad freight shed suffered damage. Half of the population of Barbara, a town left the area when the Manilla River broke its levees. In the rural town of St George in Queensland, over 74-80 houses lost their roofs due to the strong winds, amounting to £100,000 worth of damages. Damages from Goondiwindi were at £50,000. In the small town of Boggabilla, every building lost its roofings, partially and completely. In Pittsworth, winds shattered some establishment’s windows and decorations of some shops in the locality were scattered throughout the streets. Trees were uprooted and some houses were reported in Glen Innes. In Grafton, Jacaranda trees were also uprooted by strong winds. The Channel Country was reported submerged in floods due to the rain from Audrey and over 11 inches of rainfall were recorded in the outback town of Eulo in Queensland in 24 hours on an unknown date, which was double the previous record in 1887. Heavy rains also overflowed the Paroo River, also on an unknown date, submerging the town of Cunnamulla on floodwaters, killing over 7,000 sheep in the area. Several hundred people were instructed to evacuate in northwestern New South Wales on January 15 in three different towns, following the cyclone's exit to the sea as the Namoi River overflowed its banks. Over 700 individuals in Barraba were forced to leave their homes as the floodwaters rose to eight feet above the only flood level, and a third of the population of Manilla were evacuated since that day. Telephone services between Melbourne and Brisbane following Audrey and an Australian east coast low were interrupted.

On January 16, council bulldozers started to work, fixing the levees of some rivers throughout Queensland, particularly the town of Thargomindah to prevent more flooding. The floodwaters were reported entering the houses of some residents in the town, forcing them to evacuate. Meanwhile, graziers feared heavy stock losses due to the extensive floods. A grazier from Kulki station reported to authorities that between 4,000 and 5,000 sheep were lost out of his flocks of 7,000. However, the rain from Audrey caused the best rainfall in many districts in New South Wales for years. Audrey also affected road and rail transportations and sea operations. Many roadways were still flooded as of January 16.

== See also ==
- Cyclone Flora (1964) - A tropical cyclone that also caused extensive damages in Queensland and Northern Territory, with the latter in contrast during 1964.
- Cyclone Dinah - A severe tropical cyclone that caused severe damages in southern Queensland during 1967.
