= Boiling Down Works, Burketown =

Boiling Down Works
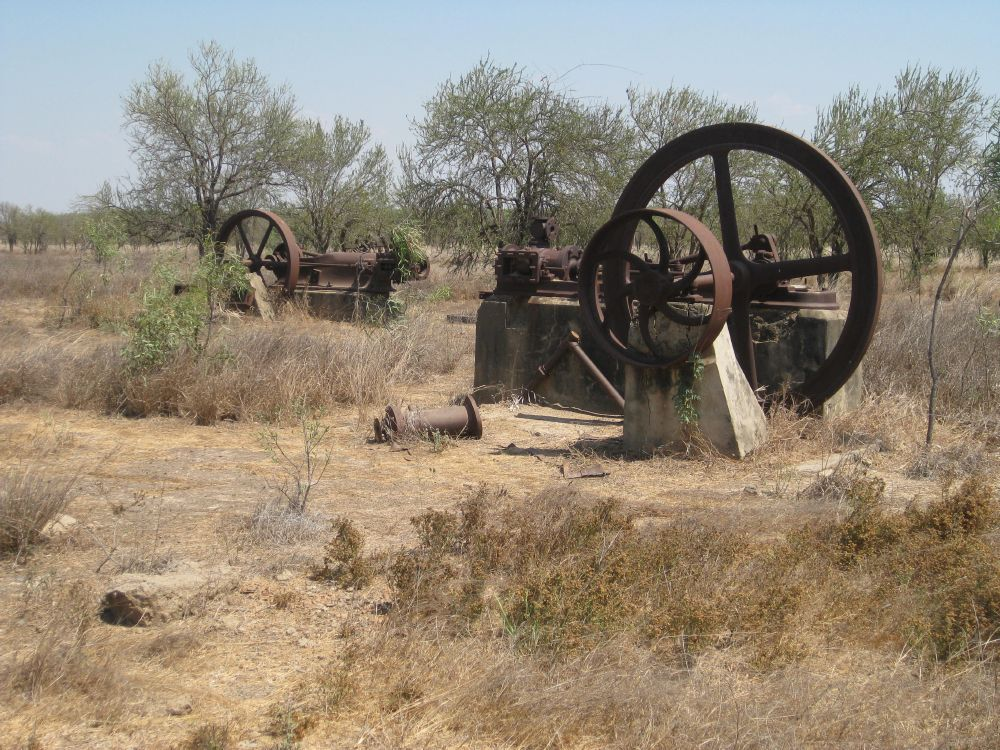
- Remnants of the Boiling Down Works, 2009

- Location within Queensland Location within Australia
- 17.7391°S 139.5648°E
- Location: Truganinni Road, Burketown, Shire of Burke, Queensland, Australia

History
- Design period: 1870s–1890s (late 19th century)
- Built: 1891–1901

Queensland Heritage Register
- Official name: Boiling Down Works
- Type: state heritage (built)
- Designated: 21 August 1992
- Reference no.: 600375
- Significant period: 1892–1901
- Significant components: boiler room/boiler house, engine/generator shed/room / power supply

Boiling Down Works is a heritage-listed boiling down works at Truganinni Road, Burketown, Shire of Burke, Queensland, Australia. It was built from 1891 to 1901. It was added to the Queensland Heritage Register on 21 August 1992.

== History ==
The first boiling down works was established in 1867. The plan was to cure beef in brine for export to Batavia. However, the business was not successful and closed in 1870.

Construction of a new boiling down works commenced in November 1891 and was operational in July 1892. However, it closed for a period around 1893–94 due to the drought. In February 1896 it shut down again after a quarantine order to prevent the spread of disease and cattle tick.

In April 1898 it was announced that the Endeavour Meat Export Agency would re-open the Burketown meatworks. However, the meatworks burned down in June 1898 and had to be rebuilt in order to re-open in June 1899.

In February 1901, the works was doing well, processing 20,000 cattle in a season. However, the business had losses from its decision to own and operate its own ships. In October 1901, the works closed temporarily due to a shortage of cattle because of the high prices being paid for cattle by Kidman Brothers and Elder, Smith & Co. In November 1902, the Queensland Government withdrew its meat inspectors from the works because of "the closing down of the meatworks and the uncertainty of about their reopening".

In 1911, in a bid to get a railway link from Burketown in order to ship cattle for processing on the east coast, it was claimed that it was no longer possible to process the cattle in Burketown as "the white ants are making havoc with all that remains of the Burketown works".
