= Burketown Post Office =

Historic post office building in Burketown, Queensland, Australia

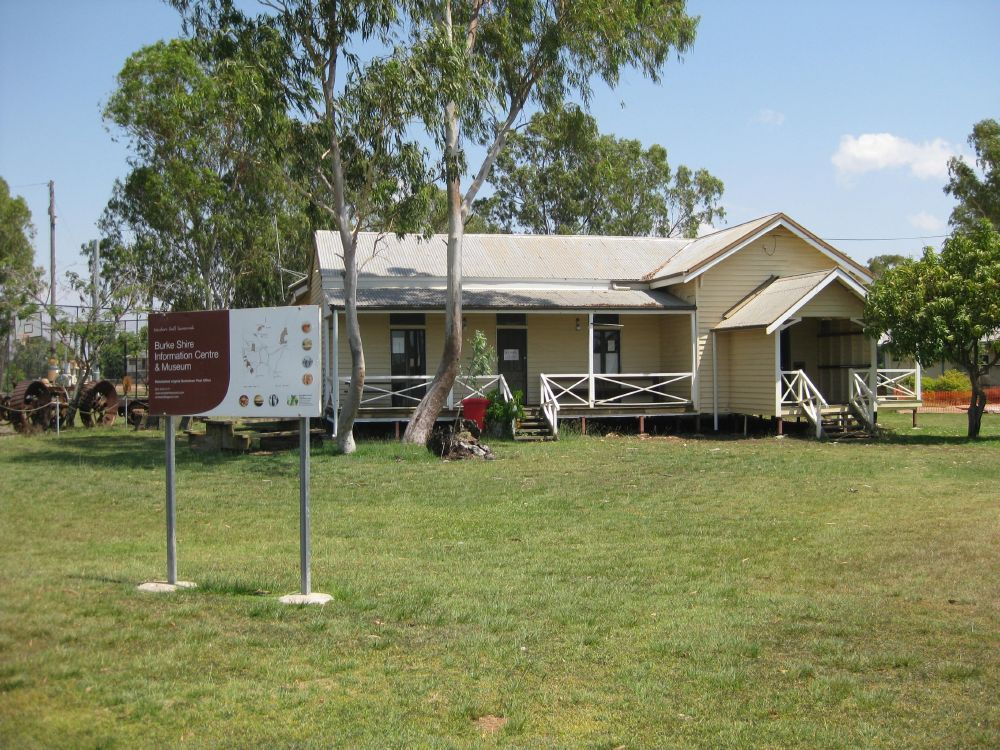
- Burketown Tourist Information Centre, formerly Post Office, 2009

- Location within Queensland Location within Australia
- 17.7413°S 139.5461°E
- Location: Musgrave Street, Burketown, Shire of Burke, Queensland, Australia

History
- Design period: 1870s–1890s (late 19th century)
- Built: 1887

Site notes
- Architect: George Connolly

Queensland Heritage Register
- Official name: Burketown Tourist Information Centre, Burketown Post Office
- Type: state heritage (built)
- Designated: 1 January 1993
- Reference no.: 600373
- Significant period: 1887 (fabric)
- Significant components: counter, post & telegraph office, residential accommodation – post master's house/quarters

Burketown Post Office is a heritage-listed former post office at Musgrave Street, Burketown, Shire of Burke, Queensland, Australia. It was designed by George Connolly and built in 1887. It is also known as Burketown Tourist Information Centre. It was added to the Queensland Heritage Register on 1 January 1993.

== History ==
The Burketown Post Office, constructed in 1887 after a cyclone devastated the town on March 5, was built to a design prepared by the Queensland Colonial Architect's office.

Pastoral settlement began in the Burke District in the 1860s after explorers such as Burke and Wills and William Landsborough reported on the good grazing land available in the region. To support the settlers in the remote district the Queensland Government established a supply depot on William Landsborough's 1862 camp site on the banks of the Albert River. This first settlement was abandoned in 1865 after Robert Towns established a store further downstream and closer to deep water anchorage.

The new site was surveyed soon after and the prosperity of the town seemed assured when a meatworks and the Boiling Down Works were built and a government judicial and administrative centre was located there. Unfortunately, a mystery disease caused great loss of life in February, 1866 and again in 1867 and 1868, forcing the population to virtually abandon the town.

After the threat of disease had passed Burketown re-established itself as a supply depot for the pastoral industry. However, the town did not come to prominence again until the early 1880s. when government services were re-established. The Post Office, closed in June 1871, was reopened on 1 January, 1883 with the post master also filling the role of police magistrate, customs officer and weather forecaster.

The district was further opened up when the domestic telegraph line reached Burketown in October, 1886. The Queensland Government had originally hoped that Burketown would be the terminus for an international telegraph line from Java to Australia. Inter colonial rivalry saw the contract for the overseas line go to South Australia in November, 1872. Although the Queensland Government was disappointed, the line was completed to Normanton. However, the link to Burketown was not completed until 1886 after the re-establishment of government services to the district.

The present building, constructed as a post office, was built after the 5 March 1887 cyclone which destroyed most of Burketown. The building was designed in the office of the Colonial Architect, George Connolly. During this period, an expansion in the Post and Telegraph translated into Queensland Post Offices being designed with more of a public facade than its adjoining residence, and showed a development of climatic responses such as verandahs and wide eaves. The Burketown Post Office was an example of a post office style, popular from 1886 to 1896, featuring a triple-frontage with projecting office bay.

The new office was a combined Post and Telegraph Office with responsibility for the issuing of mail orders and the management of land based mail contractors plying between Burketown and Normanton, south to Hughenden and Townsville and west via Gregory Downs to Camooweal. This network was a vital link for people located on stations across the northern part of Queensland. The stability of the Gulf region was also enhanced by the growth in mercantile trade as shipping companies, such as Australasian Steam Navigation Company, were awarded government-subsidised mail contracts. As a result, there was a monthly shipping service into and out of the region which was made more economically viable by the introduction of Parcel Post in 1892. The post office was proclaimed an official Post Office in 1893 with the post master assuming the role of land commissioner and land agent for the Department of Public Lands in 1897.

Following the Federation of Australia, in March 1901, control of the postal system was transferred to the Australian Government, with the post office continuing to operate until 1921 when it was reclassified. The Post Office was downgraded again in 1949 and in November, 1964 it was reclassified as a non-official post office. In 1985 Burketown Post Office became a Post Office Agency and ceased functioning altogether in 1988.

In 1988, as part of a Bicentennial project, the building was moved from its original site in Gregory Street to its present location. After the move it was used to house the office of the Gulf Air Company.

There has been an increase in interest in tourism since the Riversleigh Fossil Site was declared a world heritage area and since the Gulf region has become more accessible with improvement to roads and transport. Burketown is becoming a favourite destination particularly for people interested in fishing in Gulf waters and coastal rivers. A tourist information centre has been established in the former Post Office to assist visitors and tourists and to promote interest in the history and culture of the area.

== Description ==
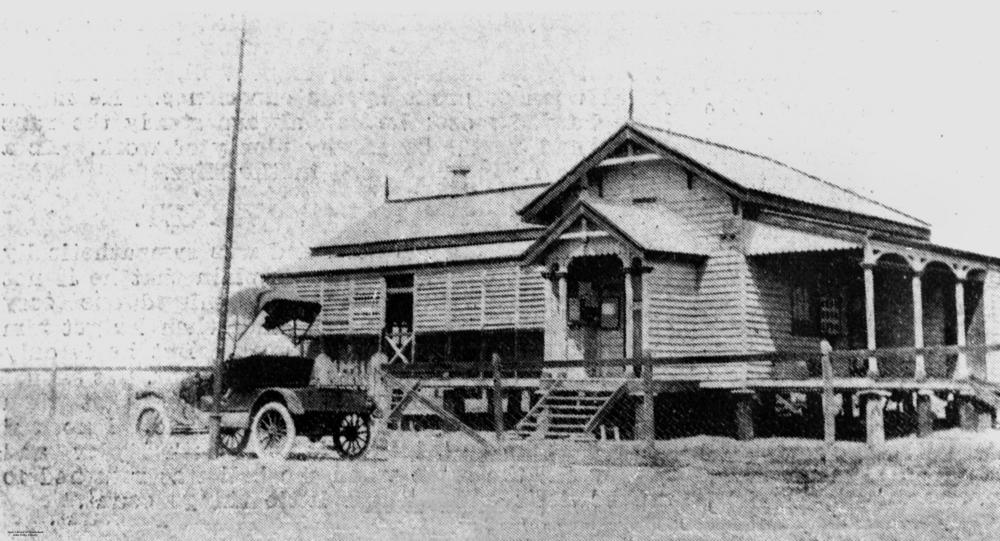
Burketown Post Office, 1920

The former Burketown Post Office (now Tourist Information Centre) is a single-storey timber building, located on the south-eastern corner of the intersection of Musgrave and Burke Streets, Burketown. Situated in the North-west of Queensland, Burketown lies on the northern fringe of the Gulf Savanna, about 30 kilometres (19 mi). from the shores of the Gulf of Carpentaria.

The site is on the rim of the town's small commercial area, with the present Boulia Shire Offices adjacent, and further to the east the hotel and shops.

The building is positioned diagonally across the site, facing north-west towards the intersection of two of the town's typically wide streets. In front of the building, at this north-western corner of the site, is the concrete war memorial backed by three flagpoles. Plaques on this memorial commemorate those who served and died in the Boer War, World War I and World War II, Malaya, Korea, Vietnam and Borneo.

The building has an L-shaped plan form, with the former Post Office at the western end, and the remainder formerly the residence. The gabled roof, clad in corrugated iron, follows the form of the building and accentuates the projecting bay of the office. The building features three open verandahs, to the front and rear of the residence, and the side of the office. The external walls are clad in weatherboards, punctuated by vertical sliding sash windows, with timber-framed window hoods to those of the north-eastern elevation. The building is low set, now supported on steel posts, with timber steps to each verandah and the entry porch.

The principal entry is a slightly asymmetrical gabled porch attached to the front of the projecting bay of the former office. Unlined internally, the porch retains the letter slot to the side of the panelled French entry doors.

The office is a rectangular room with a high boarded ceiling, horizontal beaded boards lining the walls and a boarded floor. To the public area at the front of the room is the timber counter and small timber side benches, constructed of similar beaded boards. On the rear wall is mounted several external signs from the former Post Office. Through a pair of glazed French doors is the south-western verandah, partly enclosed at the rear, and featuring arched valance boards between the posts. Behind the office is a small service room currently being fitted as a kitchen.

The north-western verandah provides entry to the former residence. Opening onto this verandah are the central four-panelled entry door, a pair of glazed French doors to one side and the same missing from the other.

The residence consists of four major rooms in an L-shaped configuration, around the rear verandah. The largest of these, the former sitting room is entered through the central door, with two former bedrooms and the kitchen along the eastern wing. Generally these rooms have internal linings similar to that of the office, apart from the kitchen which has no lining boards to the walls. Doors are generally low-waisted four-panelled doors, apart from a boarded door now to the recently constructed ensuite in the second bedroom, which was apparently relocated from the kitchen. On the rear verandah is a small utility room, now a public toilet. Apart from the signs in the office, the building also retains a telephone exchange, now located in the former bedroom.

The site is level, well grassed and scattered with a few small trees. To the rear of the site are some machinery relics.

== Heritage listing ==
The former Burketown Post Office was listed on the Queensland Heritage Register on 1 January 1993 having satisfied the following criteria.

The place is important in demonstrating the evolution or pattern of Queensland's history.

The former Burketown Post Office is significant for its association with early government functions in the remote Gulf and North West regions of Queensland and as a base for the delivery of a range of government services to the people of the area for over a century. It represents the importance of community services such as postal services, telegraph and telephone communications and weather forecasting to a remote community.

The place demonstrates rare, uncommon or endangered aspects of Queensland's cultural heritage.

Built in 1887, the former Post Office is one of few early structures surviving in the town.

The place is important in demonstrating the principal characteristics of a particular class of cultural places.

The building demonstrates the quality of government buildings erected in remote locations, with design responses to the climate such as high ceilings, window hoods and three substantial verandahs. Representative of a post office building type, it features a triple-frontage with a projecting bay accentuating the office, yet retains its domestic form and scale. The majority of the layout remains intact.

It still contains some fittings from its post office function, such as timber counters and benches, signs and the telephone exchange.

The place is important because of its aesthetic significance.

While the former Burketown Post Office has contributed to the townscape since its construction, relocation to a larger corner site, facing the war memorial, has given the building a new prominence in the townscape.

The place has a strong or special association with a particular community or cultural group for social, cultural or spiritual reasons.

The establishment of the Tourist Information Centre is allowing the building to continue providing an important community function through its contribution to the burgeoning tourist industry of the region.
