= Nicholson, Queensland =

Nicholson
- Suburb
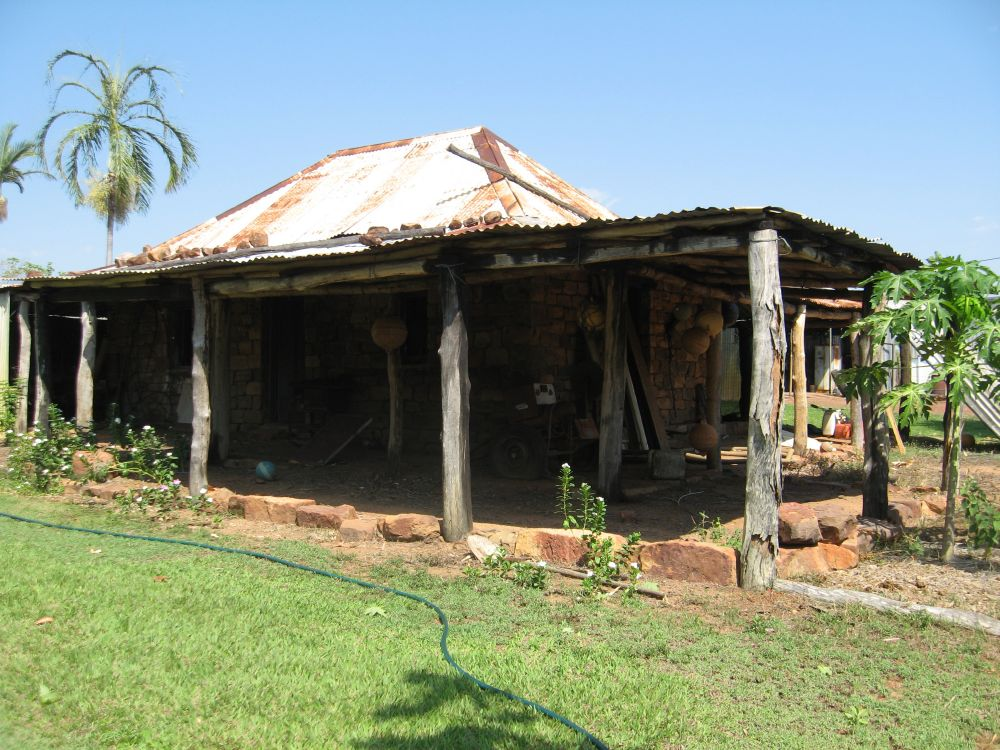
- Old Westmoreland Homestead, 2009

- Interactive map of Nicholson
- Coordinates: 17.4305°S 138.7286°E
- Country: Australia
- State: Queensland
- LGA: Shire of Burke
- Location: 99.9 km (62.1 mi) NW of Doomadgee; 240 km (150 mi) WNW of Burketown; 563 km (350 mi) N of Mount Isa; 1,093 km (679 mi) W of Cairns; 2,271 km (1,411 mi) NW of Brisbane

Government
  - State electorate: Traeger
  - Federal division: Kennedy

Area
  - Total: 17,540.6 km^{2} (6,772.5 sq mi)

Population
  - Total: 32 (2021 census)
  - Density: 0.001824/km^{2} (0.00473/sq mi)
- Time zone: UTC+10:00 (AEST)
- Postcode: 4825
Suburbs around Nicholson
Northern Territory	Gulf of Carpentaria	Gangalidda
Northern Territory	Nicholson	Burketown
Northern Territory	Doomadgee; Lawn Hill	Gregory

Nicholson is a coastal outback locality in the Shire of Burke, Queensland, Australia. It is on the border with the Northern Territory. In the 2021 census, Nicholson had a population of 32 people.

== Geography ==
The Gulf of Carpentaria forms northern and north-eastern boundaries of the locality, separated by the coastal locality of Gangalidda. The Nicholson River enters from the south-west (Northern Territory) and then forms parts of the southern boundary before re-entering the locality to discharge into the Gulf.

National Highway 1 enters the locality from the south (Doomadgee) before turning north-west to run through the locality, exiting to the Northern Territory (17.2133°S 137.9948°E). This section of the highway is also part of the Savannah Way, a tourist route.

There is a small part of the Boodjamulla National Park (formerly Lawn Hill National Park) in the south-west of the locality. Apart from this protected area, the land use is grazing on native vegetation. The land close to the close of the Gulf of Carpentaria is marshland, mostly mangrove swamps.

== History ==
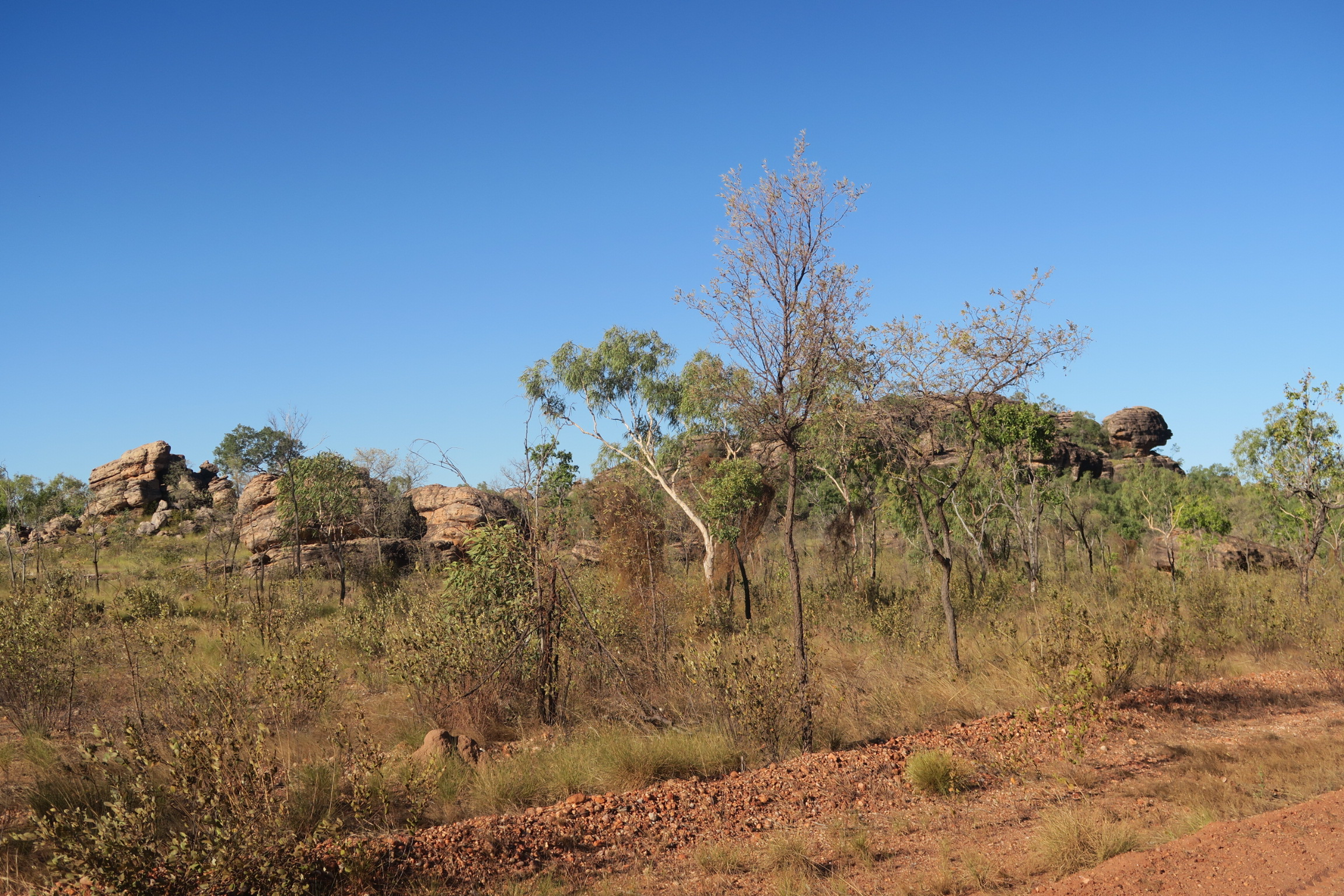
Hells Gate escarpment, 2016

Hells Gate Roadhouse is a tourist stop on the Savannah Way, 80 km from Doomadgee and 50 km from the Northern Territory border (17.4550°S 138.3562°E) on the Cliffdale cattle station. It opened on 5 April 1986. The name refers to a gap in the nearby escarpment where the road passes through.

== Demographics ==
In the 2016 census, Nicholson had "no people or a very low population".

In the 2021 census, Nicholson had a population of 32 people.

== Heritage listings ==
Nicholson has a number of heritage-listed sites, including:

- Old Westmoreland Homestead (17.3403°S 138.25°E)

== Education ==
There are no schools in Nicholson. The nearest government schools are Burketown State School (Prep to Year 6) in neighbouring Burketown to the east and Doomadgee State School (Early Childhood to Year 10) in neighbouring Doomadgee to the south. However, these schools are too distant from many parts of Nicholson for a daily commute. Nor are there any schools nearby providing education to Year 12. The alternatives are distance education and boarding school.

== Attractions ==
The Hells Gate Roadhouse provides fuel, meals, and a range of accommodation from camp sites to motel rooms. Scenic helicopter flights are available.

== Transport ==
Hells Gate airstrip (17.4667°S 138.3670°E) has one runway of length 1,500 metres (4,900 ft). It is across the road form the Hells Gate roadhouse.

== Indigenous languages ==
Yukulta (also known as Ganggalida) is an Australian Aboriginal language. The Yukulta language region is the Gulf Country including the local government areas of the Aboriginal Shire of Doomadgee and Shire of Mornington.

Yulluna (also known as Yalarnga, Yalarrnga, Jalanga, Jalannga, Wonganja, Gunggalida, Jokula) is an Australian Aboriginal language. The Yulluna language region includes the local government boundaries of the Shire of Cloncurry and other areas near the Gulf of Carpentaria.
