= Gangalidda, Queensland =

Gangalidda
- Suburb
- Interactive map of Gangalidda
- Coordinates: 16.9627°S 138.9863°E
- Country: Australia
- State: Queensland
- LGA: Aboriginal Shire of Doomadgee
- Location: 125 km (78 mi) N of Doomadgee; 222 km (138 mi) NW of Burketown; 556 km (345 mi) N of Mount Isa; 2,265 km (1,407 mi) NW of Brisbane

Government
  - State electorate: Traeger
  - Federal division: Kennedy

Area
  - Total: 273.7 km^{2} (105.7 sq mi)

Population
  - Total: 0 (2021 census)
  - Density: 0.0000/km^{2} (0.000/sq mi)
- Time zone: UTC+10:00 (AEST)
- Postcode: 4825
Suburbs around Gangalidda
Nicholson	Gulf of Carpentaria	Gulf of Carpentaria
Nicholson	Gangalidda	Gulf of Carpentaria
Nicholson	Nicholson	Nicholson

Gangalidda is a coastal locality in the Aboriginal Shire of Doomadgee, Queensland, Australia, on the Gulf of Carpentaria. In the 2021 census, Gangalidda had "no people or a very low population".

== Geography ==
The waters of the Gulf of Carpentaria form the north-eastern boundary.

Bayley Point (16.9167°S 139.0333°E) is a small blunt point on the coast within the locality, directly opposite Bayley Island, rising to about 500 metres (1,600 ft).

== History ==
In 1933 the Doomadgee Aboriginal Mission was established at Bayley Point by the Open Brethren. However, the location was remote and lacked a reliable water supply. After a cyclone destroyed the mission in 1936, the mission was relocated approximately 115 kilometres (71 mi) south on the Nicholson River to present day Doomadgee.

Prior to the creation of the Aboriginal Shire of Doomadgee in 2007, this land around the Bayley Point area was part of the locality of Nicholson in the Shire of Burke. After the creation of the new shire in 2007, the land became part of the new shire but retained the name of Nicholson. On 28 August 2009, it was renamed Gangalidda (the Yukulta / Ganggalidda people being one of the two traditional owners of the land in the Doomadgee area, the other being the Waanyi people).

== Demographics ==
In the 2016 census, Gangalidda had "no people or a very low population".

In the 2021 census, Gangalidda had "no people or a very low population".

== Education ==
There are no schools in Gangalidda nor nearby. The options are distance education and boarding school.
