= Old Westmoreland Homestead =

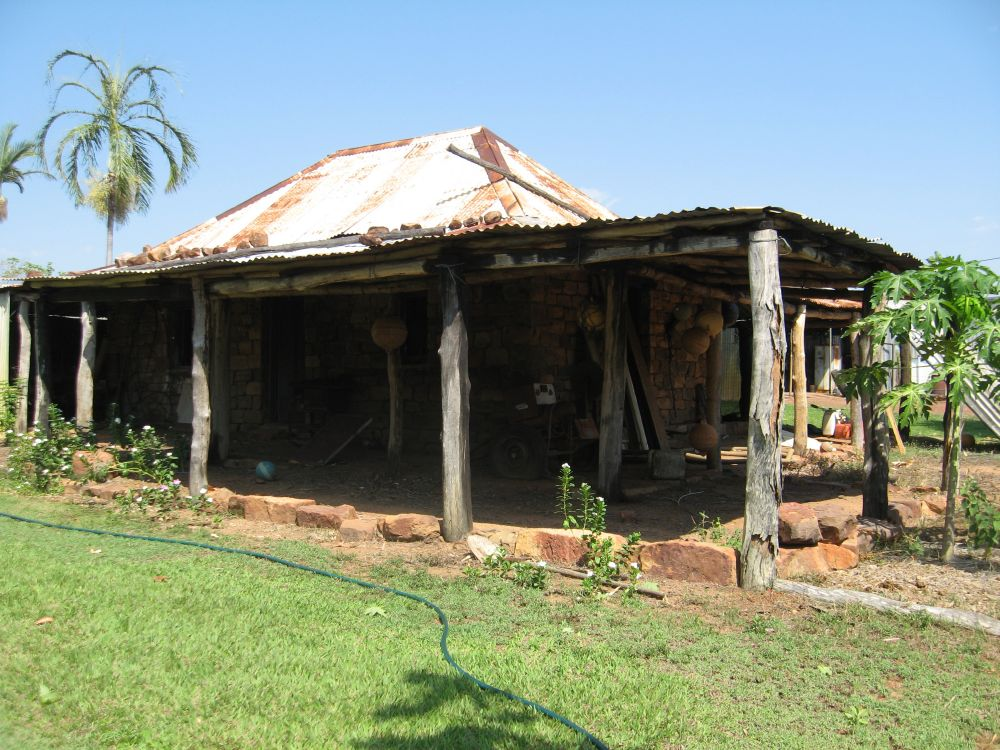
- Old Westmoreland Homestead, 2009

- Location within Queensland Location within Australia
- 17.3403°S 138.25°E
- Location: Westmoreland Station, Nicholson, Shire of Burke, Queensland, Australia

History
- Design period: 1870s–1890s (late 19th century)
- Built: c. 1882

Site notes
- Architect: Thomas Brassey McIntosh

Queensland Heritage Register
- Official name: Old Westmoreland Homestead
- Type: state heritage (built)
- Designated: 31 July 2008
- Reference no.: 602339
- Significant period: 1880s
- Builders: Thomas Brassey McIntosh

Old Westmoreland Homestead is a heritage-listed homestead at Westmoreland Station, Nicholson, Shire of Burke, Queensland, Australia. It was designed by Thomas Brassey McIntosh and built in c. 1882 by Thomas Brassey McIntosh. It was added to the Queensland Heritage Register on 31 July 2008.

== History ==
Westmoreland Station, near the border with the Northern Territory and close to the Gulf of Carpentaria, was taken up in 1881 by Thomas and Robert McIntosh, Robert Philp and William Kirk. It originally comprised 640 square miles (1,700 km^{2}). Thomas Brassey McIntosh managed the property for the partners, and c. 1882 constructed the two-roomed stone house now known as Old Westmoreland Homestead. It is believed by many local residents to be the oldest surviving home in the district.

When Westmoreland was taken up in the early 1880s, guerrilla warfare between the indigenous owners of the land and the occupying pastoralists was being waged throughout the Gulf country. There are many conflict sites in the area, including Hells Gate (20 miles (32 km) south-east of Westmoreland), Massacre Inlet and Battle Creek. The c. 1882 homestead on Westmoreland station was constructed with thick stone walls, inward opening doors, and few windows, to provide security for people and property during potential attacks by Aborigines.

By 1887 the South Australian Mortgage and Land Company had taken over the lease of Westmoreland, which by 1891 had been transferred to the Bank of Australasia.

When consolidated in 1895, the station comprised Westmoreland and Westmoreland Nos. 1 to 4, 7 and 11. The main homestead was located on Westmoreland No. 3, where improvements included an iron-roofed stone homestead, kitchen, and outbuildings, the whole valued at £200. The block comprised 100 square miles (260 km^{2}), with rich creek flats, steep stony ridges and open forests of box, bloodwood and tea-tree. Much of the land was thickly grassed and had permanent water, and was considered good cattle-fattening country in ordinary seasons.

In the late 1890s Queensland entered a period of severe and widespread drought. The Gulf country was affected and in 1897 the lease to the Westmoreland consolidated run was forfeited and the run remained unoccupied for about 15 years.

From 1 October 1912 Westmoreland was let on a 30 year lease to John Norman McIntyre. At this time the consolidated run was estimated to comprise over 655 square miles (1,700 km^{2}). In 1913 McIntyre complained that the valuations on the property were over 20 years old and many of the improvements no longer existed. On Westmoreland No.3 the roof structure to the stone homestead had been eaten by white ants and the kitchen had collapsed.

In 1916 the Westmoreland Pastoral Company took over the lease, and conducted the Westmoreland run in conjunction with its other properties: Cliffdale and Patterdale in Queensland and Wollogorang in the Northern Territory.

A valuation inspection of Westmoreland undertaken in 1932 valued the stone homestead and outbuildings at £300, the homestead stockyards at £200 and total improvements at £1,210. In 1937, a further appraisal noted that the stone homestead was the only extant residential structure on Westmoreland; there were no huts on any of the other blocks. At this period the Westmoreland Board of Directors comprised Sir William Charles Angliss and Walter Sidney Palethorpe Kidman (son of Sidney Kidman), two well-known Australian pastoralists. The lease passed to John Allan Fennell in 1938 and Thomas Staines Bernard Terry in 1939.

A new residence was constructed adjacent to the stone house during the second half of the twentieth century. It is not considered to be of cultural heritage significance.

== Description ==
Old Westmoreland Homestead is located within the precinct of the present head station adjacent to dwellings, cold room, garages and workshops. It is set amongst lawns to the south of the main sheds and a dwelling, and east of the present homestead.

The original two-roomed homestead is constructed from hewn sandstone blocks using ant bed mortar and fill. It measures 10 by 14 metres (33 by 46 ft), inclusive of the surrounding verandah, which is approximately 2.3 metres (7 ft 7 in) wide. The hipped roof of early corrugated galvanised iron is nailed with lead-head nails to bush timber roof rafters and purlins. It is secured to the external verandah posts with wire twitches. The roof is unlined.

Several of the round timber posts supporting the verandah roof have been replaced due to termite damage. The original posts appear to have been replicated in style if not in size or, possibly, timber species.

The original doors have been replaced with VJ plank doors, some half- height. Several have rim locks evident. The original timber door lintels are present but severely damaged by termites. The windows are voids with traces of the original joinery evident.

Internally, the building is divided into two rooms by a partition of hardwood framing and single-skin corrugated iron to ceiling height, the roof space open above this. Centrally positioned in this wall is the doorway connecting the two rooms. Above the door is a ventilation panel in-filled with metal lattice.

The floor was originally dirt or ant bed (pers comm. G Gould, owner). At some stage prior to 1980 it was concreted inside. Antbed flooring remains on the north-east verandah and most of the south-east verandah. It was repaired in the period 1980 to 2004.

The building is currently used for storage and outdoor entertainment. A later kitchen, 3 by 4 metres (9.8 by 13.1 ft), constructed of metal framing and cladding, is located on the south-western side of the homestead. It is not considered to be of cultural heritage significance. The original, separate kitchen, located to the north of the building, is no longer extant.

A photograph taken in 1963–1964 shows an added skillion on the northeast side extending the full length of the building. At some unknown date this has been truncated to its present size. There is no evidence to suggest whether this was part of the original homestead or, more likely, a later addition.

== Heritage listing ==
Old Westmoreland Homestead was listed on the Queensland Heritage Register on 31 July 2008 having satisfied the following criteria.

The place is important in demonstrating the evolution or pattern of Queensland's history.

Old Westmoreland Homestead, constructed c. 1882, is important for its association with, and as rare surviving evidence of, early efforts to establish the pastoral industry in north-west Queensland in the second half of the nineteenth century, during a period of frontier violence. The building shows clear evidence of being constructed with due consideration for possible conflict: thick walls (which would also have helped insulate the building), inward opening doors, and few windows.

The place demonstrates rare, uncommon or endangered aspects of Queensland's cultural heritage.

Although there has been some adaptation the building remains a rare example of vernacular nineteenth century stone pastoral homesteads in Queensland. The use of antbed mortar was once quite widespread, but few examples remain where this versatile material was put to use.

The place is important in demonstrating the principal characteristics of a particular class of cultural places.

Old Westmoreland Homestead exemplifies the simple dwellings established during nineteenth century colonial settlement in remote parts of Queensland. The simplistic form of the building, and the use of local materials, demonstrates the principal characteristics of this class of place: nineteenth century pastoral property homesteads.

The place is important because of its aesthetic significance.

The place retains a high degree of aesthetic value generated by the picturesque qualities of the simple design and the rustic materials employed in the construction: sandstone for the walls; ant bed for mortar and flooring; corrugated galvanised iron to clad the roof; and rough-cut bush timbers for the verandah posts.
