= Aboriginal Shire of Doomadgee =

Coordinates: 17°55′58″S 138°49′09″E

- Local government area
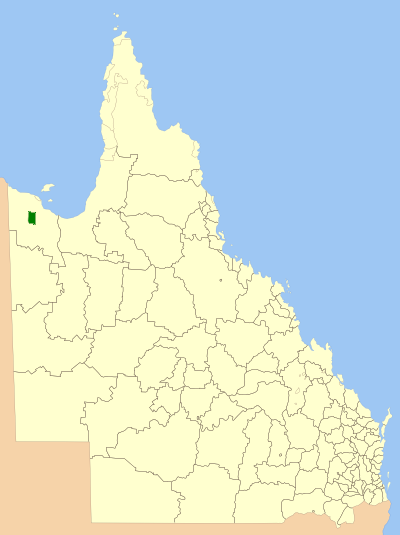
- Location within Queensland

- Interactive map of Aboriginal Shire of Doomadgee
- Country: Australia
- State: Queensland
- Region: North West Queensland
- Established: 1987
- Council seat: Doomadgee

Government
  - Mayor: Jason Grant Ned
  - State electorate: Traeger
  - Federal division: Kennedy

Area
  - Total: 1,828 km^{2} (706 sq mi)

Population
  - Total: 1,387 (2021 census)
  - Density: 0.7588/km^{2} (1.9652/sq mi)
- Website: Aboriginal Shire of Doomadgee

The Aboriginal Shire of Doomadgee is a special local government area in North West Queensland, Queensland, Australia. It is managed under a Deed of Grant in Trust under the Local Government (Community Government Areas) Act 2004.

In the 2021 census, the Aboriginal Shire of Doomadgee had a population of 1,387 people.

== Geography ==
The shire is located within the Gulf Country to the south of the Gulf of Carpentaria. It consists of two disconnected areas of land: the locality of Doomadgee which is inland and the locality of Gangalidda on the coast of the gulf. The shire was excised from the Shire of Burke and is surrounded by the Shire of Burke.

== History ==
The name Doomadgee derives from Dumaji, a coastal sand dune in the traditional land of the Yukulta / Ganggalidda people.

Waanyi (also known as Wanyi, Wanyee, Wanee, Waangyee, Wonyee, Garawa, and Wanji) is an Australian Aboriginal language of the Gulf Country. The language region includes the western parts of Lawn Hill Creek and Nicholson River, from about the boundary between the Northern Territory and Queensland, westwards towards Alexandria station, Doomadgee, and Nicholson River. It includes the local government area of the Aboriginal Shire of Doomadgee. The Yukulta (also known as Ganggalida) language region is also of the Gulf Country, including the local government areas of the Aboriginal Shire of Doomadgee and Shire of Mornington.

"Old Doomadgee Mission" was established in 1933 by the Akehursts, a Christian Brethren family, supported by the church and Queensland's Chief Protector of Aboriginals, to house primarily Gangalidda people who had ended up living on the fringes of the Burketown township. It was located at Dumaji at Bayley Point Aboriginal reserve, on Gangalidda land. After a cyclone in 1936 destroyed the settlement, and the decision was made to move the settlement to Nicholson River, where the later Doomadgee Mission was established at "new Doomadgee".

Doomadgee's population increased greatly during the 1950s-1960s, and facilities including a store, bank, post office, rodeo ground and a bakery were established. From a population of 138 in 1938, it had grown to 1257 by 2011.

On 30 March 1985, the Doomadgee community elected five councillors to constitute an autonomous Doomadgee Aboriginal Council, and on 21 May 1987, under the Community Services (Aborigines) Act 1984 the Aboriginal reserve was transferred from the Queensland Government to the trusteeship of the Doomadgee Aboriginal Council, under a Deed of Grant in Trust (DOGIT). The area included the sites of both the former and current mission.

On 1 January 2005, the Doomadgee Aboriginal Council became the Doomadgee Aboriginal Shire Council.

In 2010 the Doomadgee Aboriginal Shire Council was established under the Local Government Act 2009.

== Demographics ==
In the 2016 census, the Aboriginal Shire of Doomadgee had a population of 1,405 people.

In the 2021 census, the Aboriginal Shire of Doomadgee had a population of 1,387 people.

== People ==
The majority of residents are Gangalidda or Waanyi people, but smaller populations of Gadawa, Lardil, Mingginda and Garawa are also resident within Doomadgee.

== Mayors ==
- 2008–2016: Frederick O'Keefe
- 2016–2020: Edric Walden
- 2020–present: Jason Grant Ned

== See also ==
- Doomadgee, Queensland
