= Burketown =

- Town
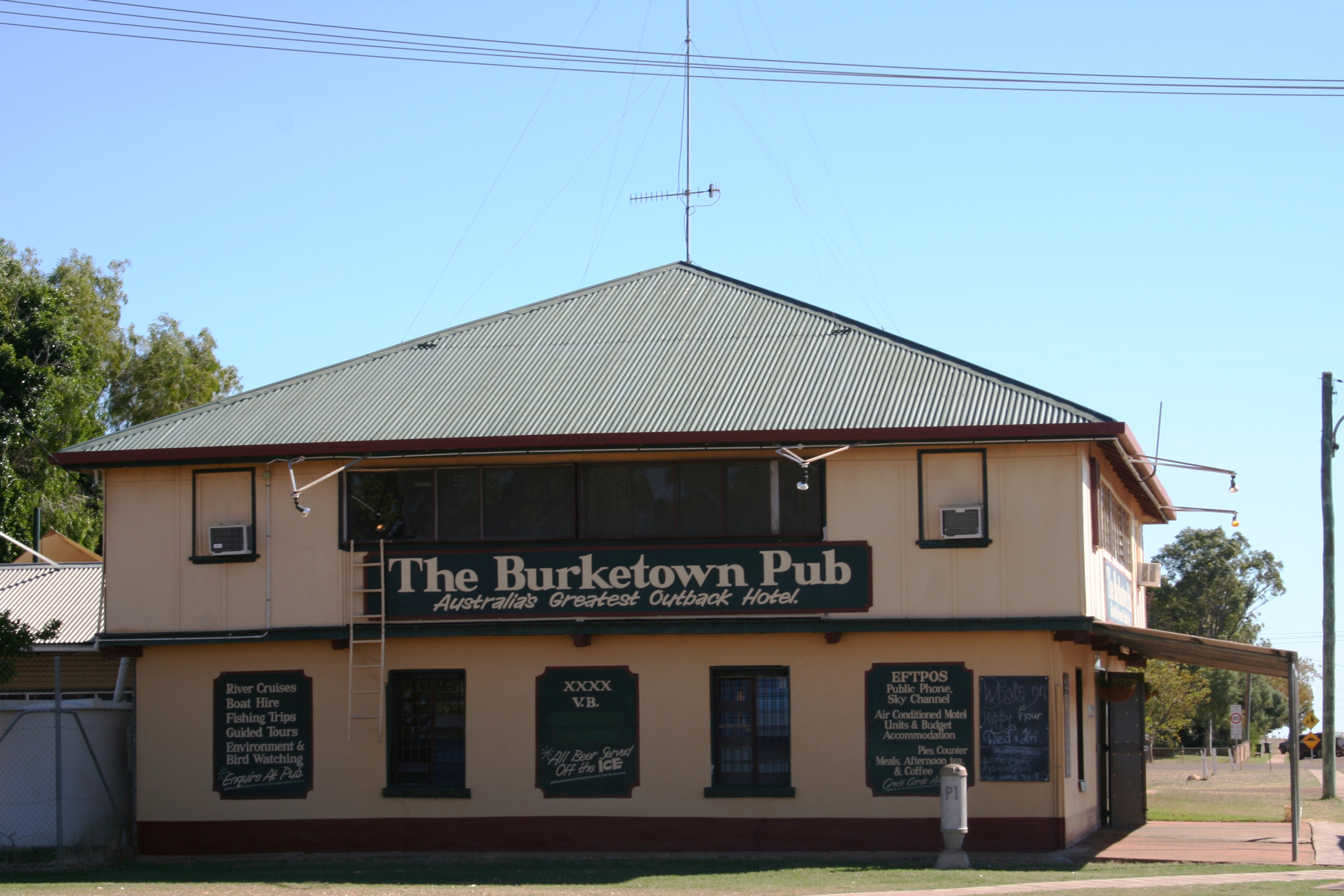
- Burketown pub (destroyed by fire in 2012)

- Interactive map of Burketown
- Coordinates: 17.7408°S 139.5477°E
- Country: Australia
- State: Queensland
- LGA: Shire of Burke
- Location: 225 km (140 mi) W of Normanton; 426 km (265 mi) N of Mount Isa; 894 km (556 mi) W of Cairns; 1,064 km (661 mi) WNW of Townsville; 2,134 km (1,326 mi) NW of Brisbane
- Established: 1865

Government
  - State electorate: Traeger
  - Federal division: Kennedy

Area
  - Total: 1,713.3 km^{2} (661.5 sq mi)
- Elevation: 6 m (20 ft)

Population
  - Total: 204 (2021 census)
  - Density: 0.11907/km^{2} (0.3084/sq mi)
- Time zone: UTC+10:00 (AEST)
- Postcode: 4830
- Mean max temp: 32.2 °C (90.0 °F)
- Mean min temp: 20.0 °C (68.0 °F)
- Annual rainfall: 788.0 mm (31.02 in)
Localities around Burketown
| Nicholson | Gulf of Carpentaria | Gulf of Carpentaria |
| Nicholson | Burketown | Carpentaria |
| Gregory | Gregory | Carpentaria |

Burketown is an isolated outback town and coastal locality in the Shire of Burke, Queensland, Australia. It is located 898 kilometres or 558 miles west of Cairns and 227 kilometres or 141 miles west of Normanton on the Albert River and Savannah Way in the area known as the Gulf Savannah. In the 2021 census, the locality of Burketown had a population of 204 people.

== Geography ==
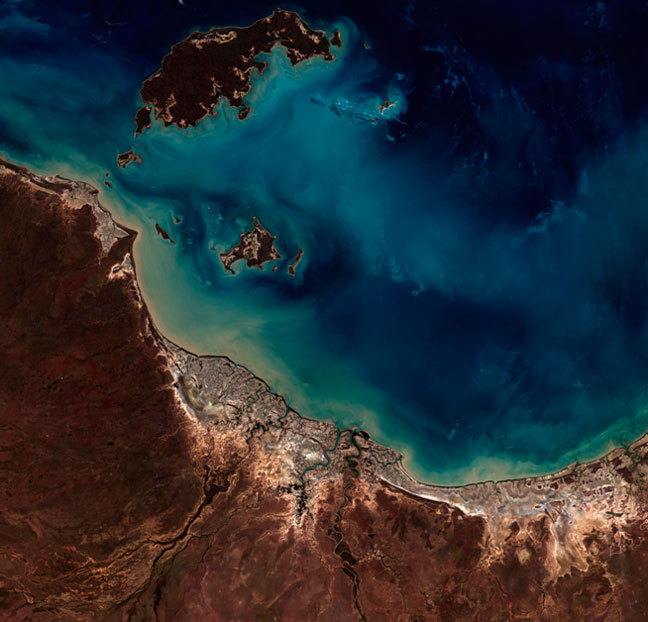
Satellite image of Burketown on 12 May 2021.

Burketown is located on the Albert River 2,115 kilometres (1,314 mi) to the northwest of the state capital, Brisbane, with the nearest larger town being Normanton, 227 kilometres (141 mi) to the east, and the nearest city being Mount Isa, 425 kilometres (264 mi) to the south. The town is roughly 30 kilometres (19 mi) inland from the Gulf of Carpentaria. It is located 898 kilometres (558 mi) west of Cairns via the Savannah Way passing through the area known as the Gulf Savannah.

The town is the administrative centre of the Burke Shire Council.

== History ==
=== Aboriginal history ===
Aboriginal Australian peoples had inhabited the region for millennia before European explorers travelled the area. Archeologists and linguists pinpoint the area surrounding Burketown as the urheimat of Pama–Nyungan languages spoken across almost all of the continent. The Yukulta / Gangalidda and Garawa peoples are recognised as the traditional owners of the Burketown area. Native title was recognised on 1 April 2015.

A mission was established in 1930 at Burketown by Len and Dorothy Akehurst, who were members of the Christian Brethren. In 1932–33 the Akehursts moved the mission to Bayley Point, near Doomadgee, about 100 kilometres (62 mi) away, at the request of the Aboriginal people, creating Dumaji, or the Old Doomadgee Mission.

Prior to the establishment of Doomadgee Mission, many Aboriginal children in the Gulf region were removed to Mornington Island Mission and other missions and Aboriginal reserves further south. Queensland Government records indicate that over 160 people were removed from Burketown between 1900 and 1974.

=== Exploration ===
On 2 August 1841, Captain J. Lort Stokes was the first European to discover the mouth of a river, which he named the "Albert" after Albert, Prince Consort. Stokes' party ascended the river for a distance of 50 river miles in a long boat in search of fresh water. Having followed a bumper wet season, Stokes was greeted by endless grassy plains, which he named "The Plains of Promise" after a day of exploration. The area was originally named for the 'Plains of Promise' or 'Province of Albert' after Prince Albert, the Queen's Consort in 1841.

=== Town establishment ===
Burketown, or "Burke Town", was named in honour of explorer Robert O'Hara Burke, who died shortly after making the first recorded successful south-north crossing of the continent in 1860–61. The first European settlers arrived in the local region not long after Burke and partner William John Wills' expedition. By the mid-1860s, several cattle stations – including Gregory Downs, Floraville, and Donors Hill – had been founded inland from the present site of Burketown. Burketown was formally established in 1865 by Robert Towns, chiefly to serve as a port and supply centre for his extensive properties in the Gulf country. Towns chartered a small vessel, the Jacmel Packet, and on 12 June 1865 it arrived off the mouth of the Albert River. The goods were eventually landed on the present site of Burketown. Towns, a prominent Sydney pastoralist and financier, also established Townsville in the same year.

By September 1865 the population was about 40 and by October a store and a hotel were under construction; the rest of buildings were humpies. Rations and grog were plentiful but already one evil was noted: prices for goods were so high that some intended settlers could not stay. The town grew; however currency, both notes and coins, were so short in early Burketown that the business people issued their own currency, dubbed "shinplaster" or "calabashers". These were in the form of IOU's hand printed on tissue paper so that they had as short a life as possible. In February 1866 Lieutenant Wentworth D'Arcy UHR with 8 troopers and accompanied by William Landsborough, the first Police Magistrate, rode into Burketown where everyone carried a pistol and where a successful shop keeper could ride well, shoot well and be an able pugilist. The pioneer spirit was indomitable and the first official race meeting was held on 25 July 1866 with prize money at $200 (sic). In October 1868 Towns and Co traded wool, tallow, hides and skins between Sweers Island and Batavia.

Burketown Post Office opened on 1 July 1866, closed in 1871 and reopened in 1883.

In the same year, settlement of the region heavily impacted the sovereign Indigenous peoples. With their lands stolen and hunting grounds denied, local Aboriginal peoples hunted the horses of the settlers. Retribution by the settlers was enacted under Sub Inspector Uhr and was assisted by the arrival of the Queensland Native Police. A massacre of 30 Aboriginal people took place after 12 horses were killed. A further 29 Aboriginal people were murdered shortly afterwards by shooting and bludgeoning. As the Burketown correspondent of the Port Denison Times reported on 4 June 1868, "everybody in the district is delighted with the wholesale slaughter dealt out by the native police". The newspaper paid "thanks" to those involved in "ridding the district of fifty-nine (59) myalls" or local Aboriginal people.

Burketown was used by explorer Francis Cadell as a staging point for refitting and refuelling the steamer Eagle and collecting mail and fresh supplies during his 1867–68 survey of the Northern Territory coastline.

At first, hopes the town would develop into a major settlement in north-western Queensland were high. However, from 1866 tropical diseases ravaged the population. The vessel "Margaret and Mary" from Sydney came into port rife with "Gulf Fever" (never properly identified, but thought to be either malaria or typhoid). Estimates of the numbers who died vary from 25 to 100 people. The majority of the crew and passengers of ship including the captain's wife died. Many of the dead were buried in a mass grave in Burketown Cemetery. Landsborough evacuated the survivors to Sweers Island for a period of 18 months, where a further two died and were buried on the island.

At the first land sales in the town on 14 August 1867, 75 allotments were sold.

The town was devastated by a tropical cyclone on 5 March 1887 which flooded almost all of Burketown. Only the highest part of town, near where the Council Office is currently located, escaped the waters from the Gulf of Carpentaria. A copy of a 1918 report to the Queensland Parliament from the Department of Harbours and Rivers Engineers refers to the sea rising to 5.5 metres above the highest spring tide level at the Albert River Heads. This level is about 8 metres above Australian Height Datum. Seven people of the population of 138 died in the cyclone.

Burketown State School opened on 26 April 1888.

Large numbers of Chinese men and others from a wide variety of backgrounds also came to the Gulf Country after colonisation. The came to northern Australia following the discovery of gold around the Palmer River in northeast Queensland and at Pine Creek in the Northern Territory in the 1870s. By the late nineteenth century, it is estimated that Chinese people outnumbered those of European ancestry north of the tropic of Capricorn. Chinese migration into Queensland’s Gulf Country probably peaked in the early 1890s, just before the institution of the Chinese Immigration Restriction Act 1891 (Qld). This law aimed to prevent the arrival of Chinese through the introduction of a £10 poll tax—an amount equivalent to six months’ wages for an average worker at the time.

For a Chinese person to legally emigrate from the Northern Territory to Queensland in this period, it would have cost this tax in addition to the cost of a steamer from Darwin to Townsville, which was £5 in 1898—a prohibitive expense. To avoid this cost, many Chinese attempted to walk overland to Queensland, mostly following the coastal track through the southern Gulf Country that Leichhardt pioneered in the 1840s. This route, some 1780 kilometres from Darwin to Burketown, is estimated to have taken about three months to traverse. Many of those who attempted it were arrested as soon as they arrived in Queensland, near Burketown and kept in the Burketown Gaol for a time. However, others managed to evade arrest and remain in the Gulf Country at this time, and for a long time thereafter, coming to live on the fringes of Burketown at Woods Lake and Hookeys Lagoon, as well as on stations and around mines. While living separately from other Australians, many of these men became close to Aboriginal people, conceiving children with Aboriginal wives and many people in the area today have Chinese heritage.

Records show that Woods Lake with its excellent water supply was then the site of a flourishing market garden, where the Chinese skills in vegetable production were well employed. This source of fresh food was very important in countering scurvy, the scourge of remote places as well as ships at sea. The garden supplied Burketown and exported some produce to Thursday Island. No details are known of the names of the producers or of the volume of their export trade, but it seems likely that they could have been associated with the two Chinese, Lee Gee and Jimmy Ah Fin who were the local bakers in Burketown at the time.

The Burketown Hotel, established in 1920 in a building originally used as the customs bond store, was destroyed by fire in 2012. The Albert Hotel building, originally the Burketown customs house is believed to date from the 1860s. Another famous Burketown Hotel, the Commonwealth, was built in around 1926, but was also destroyed by fire in 1954.

=== 20th century ===
Burketown's population peaked at 265 in 1911.

=== 21st century ===
On 22 March 2012, the 92-year-old pub was destroyed in an early morning fire. The pub was subsequently rebuilt.

== Demographics ==
In the 2006 census, the town of Burketown had a population of 173 people.

In the 2011 census, the locality of Burketown had a population of 201 people.

In the 2016 census, the locality of Burketown had a population of 238 people.

In the 2021 census, the locality of Burketown had a population of 204 people.

== Heritage listings ==
Burketown has a number of heritage-listed sites, including:

- Landsborough Tree
- Former Burketown Post Office, Musgrave Street
- Boiling Down Works, Truganinni Road
- Old Westmoreland Homestead, 150 kilometres (93 mi) west-north-west of Burketown in Nicholson

== Climate ==
Burketown has a tropical savanna climate (Köppen "Aw"), although it lies very close to the threshold of a hot semi-arid climate ("BSh"). According to the Bureau of Meteorology, the town receives a mean annual rainfall of 810.2 mm, with about 95% falling between November and April. Summers are hot and humid with erratic rainfall, while winters are warm and extremely dry. December is the hottest month, with average maximum temperatures rising to 35.4 °C (95.7 °F). Rainfall is minimal from April to November, but from December to March monthly rainfalls of over 500 millimetres (20 in) and daily falls over 250 millimetres (10 in) are not rare. Flooding, often associated with the passage of a tropical cyclone, often isolates the community for months, whilst failure of the summer rains can be extreme — for instance in the 1901/1902 wet season no more than 172 millimetres (6.77 in) fell and the drought caused the death of millions of cattle.

Climate data for Burketown (17°44′24″S, 139°33′00″E, 6 m AMSL) (1890–2009 normals and extremes; rainfall 1886–2025)
| Month | Jan | Feb | Mar | Apr | May | Jun | Jul | Aug | Sep | Oct | Nov | Dec | Year |
|---|---|---|---|---|---|---|---|---|---|---|---|---|---|
| Record high °C (°F) | 45.2 (113.4) | 43.2 (109.8) | 41.1 (106.0) | 40.6 (105.1) | 37.1 (98.8) | 35.0 (95.0) | 34.6 (94.3) | 36.0 (96.8) | 39.0 (102.2) | 41.7 (107.1) | 44.4 (111.9) | 43.8 (110.8) | 45.2 (113.4) |
| Mean daily maximum °C (°F) | 34.2 (93.6) | 33.6 (92.5) | 33.5 (92.3) | 33.1 (91.6) | 30.5 (86.9) | 28.0 (82.4) | 27.7 (81.9) | 29.4 (84.9) | 31.9 (89.4) | 34.2 (93.6) | 35.4 (95.7) | 35.4 (95.7) | 32.2 (90.0) |
| Mean daily minimum °C (°F) | 25.0 (77.0) | 24.7 (76.5) | 23.5 (74.3) | 20.8 (69.4) | 17.1 (62.8) | 14.3 (57.7) | 13.1 (55.6) | 14.5 (58.1) | 17.8 (64.0) | 21.1 (70.0) | 23.7 (74.7) | 24.8 (76.6) | 20.0 (68.0) |
| Record low °C (°F) | 17.2 (63.0) | 16.1 (61.0) | 15.0 (59.0) | 9.9 (49.8) | 5.7 (42.3) | 4.4 (39.9) | 3.3 (37.9) | 3.7 (38.7) | 7.6 (45.7) | 10.9 (51.6) | 14.2 (57.6) | 15.0 (59.0) | 3.3 (37.9) |
| Average precipitation mm (inches) | 222.9 (8.78) | 202.1 (7.96) | 160.8 (6.33) | 26.3 (1.04) | 6.2 (0.24) | 5.7 (0.22) | 2.5 (0.10) | 1.0 (0.04) | 1.8 (0.07) | 12.8 (0.50) | 40.8 (1.61) | 116.0 (4.57) | 810.2 (31.90) |
| Average precipitation days (≥ 1.0 mm) | 10.3 | 10.3 | 6.8 | 1.5 | 0.6 | 0.5 | 0.3 | 0.1 | 0.3 | 1.0 | 3.0 | 6.1 | 40.9 |
| Average afternoon relative humidity (%) | 57 | 59 | 51 | 40 | 36 | 35 | 33 | 31 | 34 | 38 | 43 | 50 | 42 |
| Average dew point °C (°F) | 22.0 (71.6) | 22.2 (72.0) | 20.0 (68.0) | 15.4 (59.7) | 12.0 (53.6) | 9.3 (48.7) | 7.6 (45.7) | 8.0 (46.4) | 11.0 (51.8) | 14.9 (58.8) | 17.8 (64.0) | 20.5 (68.9) | 15.1 (59.2) |
Source: Bureau of Meteorology (1890–2009 normals and extremes; rainfall 1886–2025)

=== Morning glory cloud ===
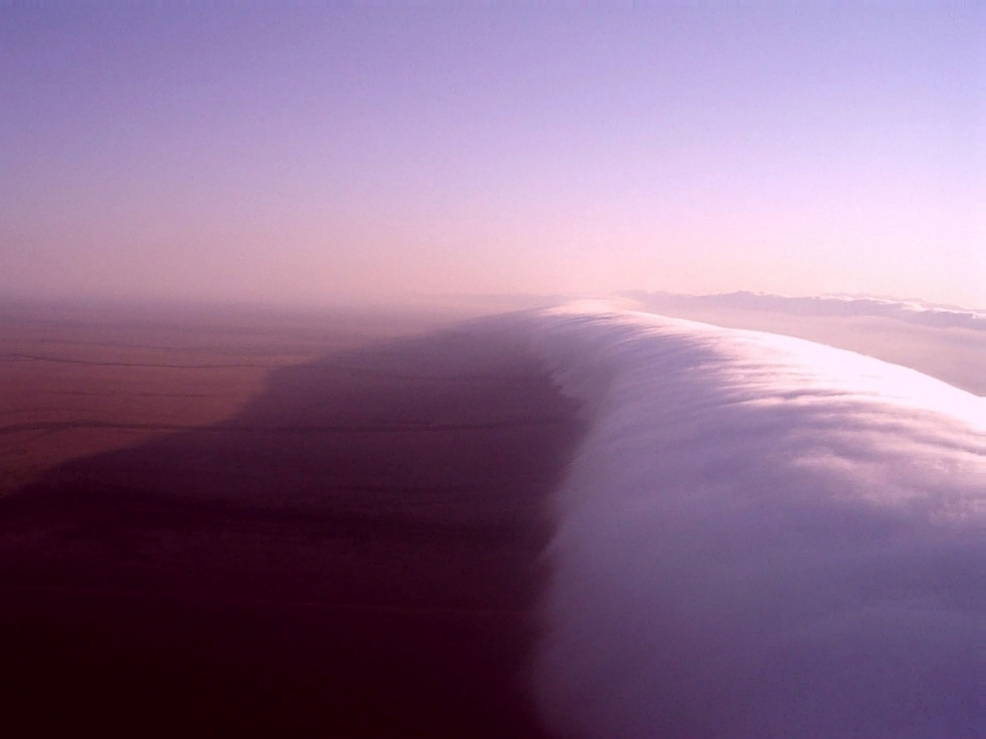
A Morning Glory cloud near Burketown.

From the months of August to November, a rare meteorological phenomenon known as "Morning Glory" – long, tubular clouds, some up to 1,000 kilometres (620 mi) in length – is often observed in the skies above Burketown.The Morning Glory has become something of a "mecca" for soaring pilots who surf the giant atmospheric wave in their gliders. Gliding flights of over 500 kilometres (310 mi) have become common.

== Education ==
Burketown State School is a government primary (Prep–6) school for boys and girls at 51 Beames Street (17.7389°S 139.5478°E). In 2017, the school had an enrolment of 23 students with 3 teachers and 5 non-teaching staff (3 full-time equivalent). In 2018, the school had an enrolment of 27 students with 3 teachers and 7 non-teaching staff (4 full-time equivalent).

There are no secondary schools in Burketown. The closest secondary schools are in Normanton, 227 kilometres (141 mi) to the east and Mount Isa, 425 kilometres (264 mi) to the south. There are also opportunities for students to complete their education by way of boarding school or via the Mt Isa School of Distance Education.

== Facilities ==
Burketown has a post office, council office, service station, small general stores/take away shops, bakery and butcher caravan park, outpost hospital and a hotel.

It is serviced by the Royal Flying Doctor Service from Mount Isa Base. The Burke Shire Council operate the Burketown Airport which has a regular passenger service from Regional Express Airlines and is also the primary base of Savannah Aviation, which provides aircraft charter services throughout the Gulf, far north/western Queensland and the Northern Territory.

Burketown Police Station is in Gregory Street (17.7432°S 139.5473°E).

Burketown SES Facility is on the south-east corner of Musgrave Street and Beames Street (17.7410°S 139.5482°E).

Burketown Primary Health Care Clinic is a small public hospital on Truganini Road (17.7324°S 139.5490°E). Burketown Ambulance Station is at the health centre (17.7325°S 139.5488°E).

Burketown Cemetery is on an unnamed road immediately north of the hospital on Truganini Road (17.7206°S 139.5433°E).

The sewage treatment plant is off to the north of the Wills Developmental Road (17.7399°S 139.5344°E). The water treatment plant is to the north-west of the sewage treatment plant (17.7391°S 139.5371°E). These are operated by the Burke Shire Council.

== Amenities ==
The Burke Shire Council operates a public library at Lot 65, Musgrave Street.

There is a barge/boat ramp with jetty and pontoon on Truganina Road on the north bank of the Albert River (17.7333°S 139.5925°E). It is managed by the Burke Shire Council.

== Attractions ==
Burketown is known as the barramundi capital of Australia and holds an annual Barramundi Fishing Competition during Easter.

Escott Station, which includes a tourist lodge, is about 17 kilometres (11 mi) from Burketown.

== In culture ==
Burketown is believed to be the basis of “Willstown” (named after Burke's fellow explorer Wills) in the novel A Town Like Alice by Nevil Shute. In the novel, the town has little in the way of amenities and is developed into a successful and growing community to become a town like Alice Springs.
