= Albert River (Gulf Savannah) =

River in the Gulf Country of Queensland, Australia

Coordinates: 17°34′29″S 139°45′20″E

The Albert River is a river in the Gulf Country of Queensland, Australia. It passes by the town of Burketown and drains into the Gulf of Carpentaria. The waters near the mouth of the river are frequented by dugongs.

== See also ==
- List of rivers of Australia
