= Gregory, Queensland =

Gregory
- Town
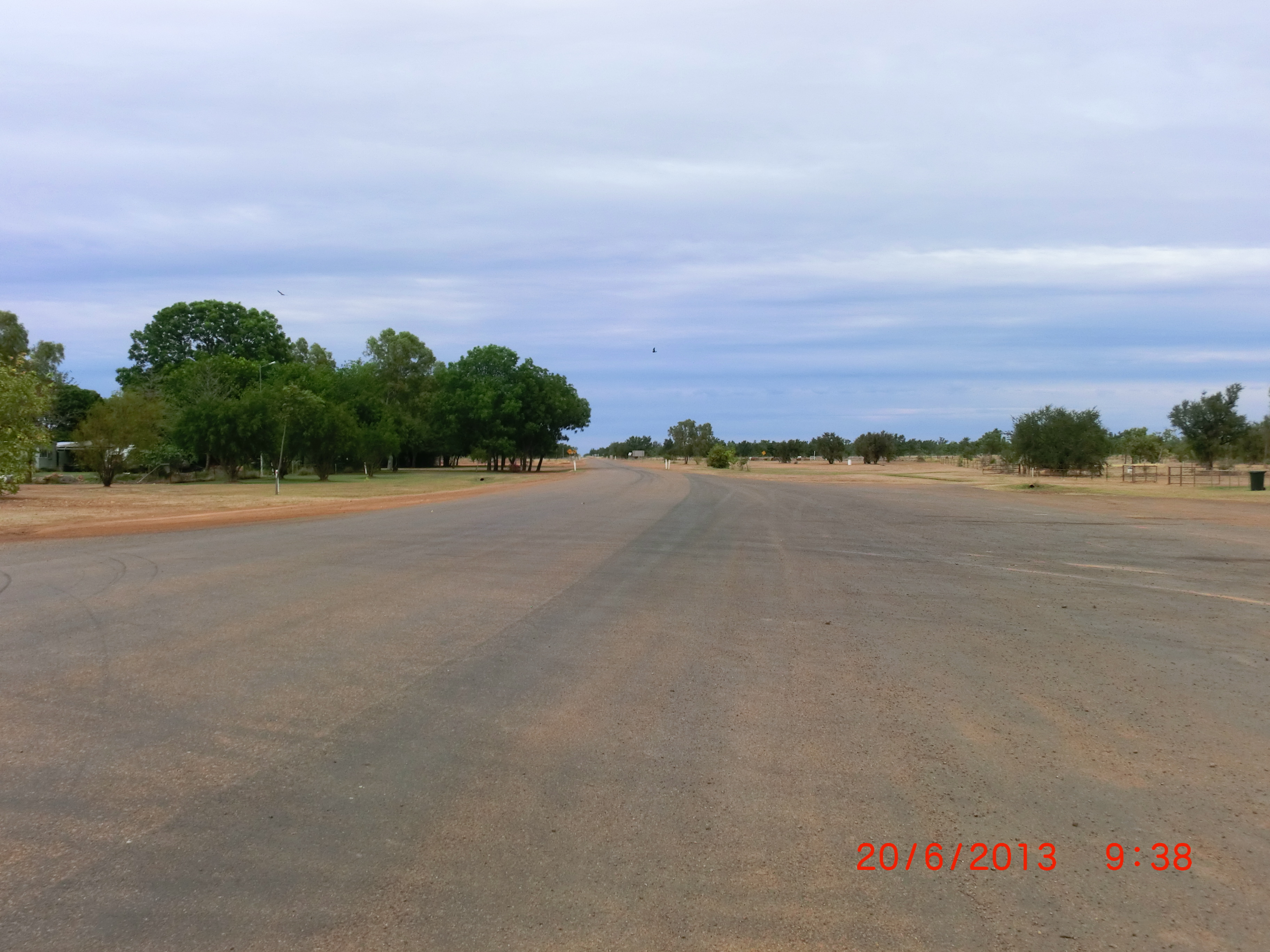
- Wills Developmental Road in Gregory, 2013

- Interactive map of Gregory
- Coordinates: 18.6522°S 139.2547°E
- Country: Australia
- State: Queensland
- LGA: Shire of Burke
- Location: 120 km (75 mi) SSW of Burketown; 306 km (190 mi) N of Mount Isa; 1,031 km (641 mi) W of Townsville; 2,014 km (1,251 mi) NW of Brisbane

Government
  - State electorate: Traeger
  - Federal division: Kennedy

Area
  - Total: 10,538.4 km^{2} (4,068.9 sq mi)

Population
  - Total: 122 (2021 census)
  - Density: 0.01158/km^{2} (0.02998/sq mi)
- Time zone: UTC+10:00 (AEST)
- Postcode: 4830
Localities around Gregory
| Nicholson | Burketown | Carpentaria |
| Lawn Hill | Gregory | Stokes |
| Lawn Hill | Gunpowder | Gidya |

Gregory (formerly Gregory Downs) is an outback town and locality in the Shire of Burke, Queensland, Australia. In the 2021 census, the locality of Gregory had a population of 122 people.

== Geography ==
The town is situated on the banks of the perennial Gregory River. The Gregory River was named by explorer William Landsborough on 19 November 1861, after explorer Augustus Charles Gregory, the first Surveyor General of Queensland.

Gregory Downs is a pastoral station which breeds cattle on 266,425 hectares (658,350 acres) of native grazing land. It carries approximately 30,000 Brahman cattle, a breed suitable for the Gulf Country. It has an 85-kilometre (53 mi) frontage to the Gregory River. It was one of the first pastoral stations established in the Gulf Country.

== History ==
Gregory Post Office opened on 2 May 1878 and closed in 1894.

The Gregory Downs pastoral station was established in 1876 by the Watson brothers (Harry F. Watson, Sidney Grandison Watson and Robert McGregor Watson) who travelled overland with approximately 900 cattle. They liked the clear running water in the Gregory River and settled at a crossing point of the river with their cattle on the western bank and their homestead on the eastern bank. In the late 1800s they built the Gregory Downs Hotel and Store near the homestead (18.6497°N 139.2533°E), but eventually decided that they found the travellers too much of a nuisance and so they relocated their homestead onto the western bank of the river (18.6417°S 139.2517°E). There was a coach service from the hotel to Burketown. The hotel also served as a post for the mounted police.

The town had a population of 40 people in 2008.

In 2013, the town was renamed from Gregory Downs to Gregory.

== Demographics ==
In the 2016 census, the locality of Gregory had a population of 72 people.

In the 2021 census, the locality of Gregory had a population of 122 people.

== Education ==
There are no schools in Gregory. The nearest government primary school is Burketown State School in neighbouring Burketown to the north; however, Gregory is so large that the school would only be accessible to those living in the northern parts of Gregory. There are no secondary schools in Gregory, nor nearby. The alternatives for schooling are distance education and boarding schools.

== Amenities ==
The Gregory branch of the Queensland Country Women's Association meets at various locations in the district.

== Attractions ==
Willis Lookout is a tourist attraction (18.9833°S 139.2500°E).

Brodies Lookout is a tourist attraction (18.9167°S 139.5667°E).

== See also ==
- Boodjamulla National Park
