= Doomadgee, Queensland =

Doomadgee
- Town
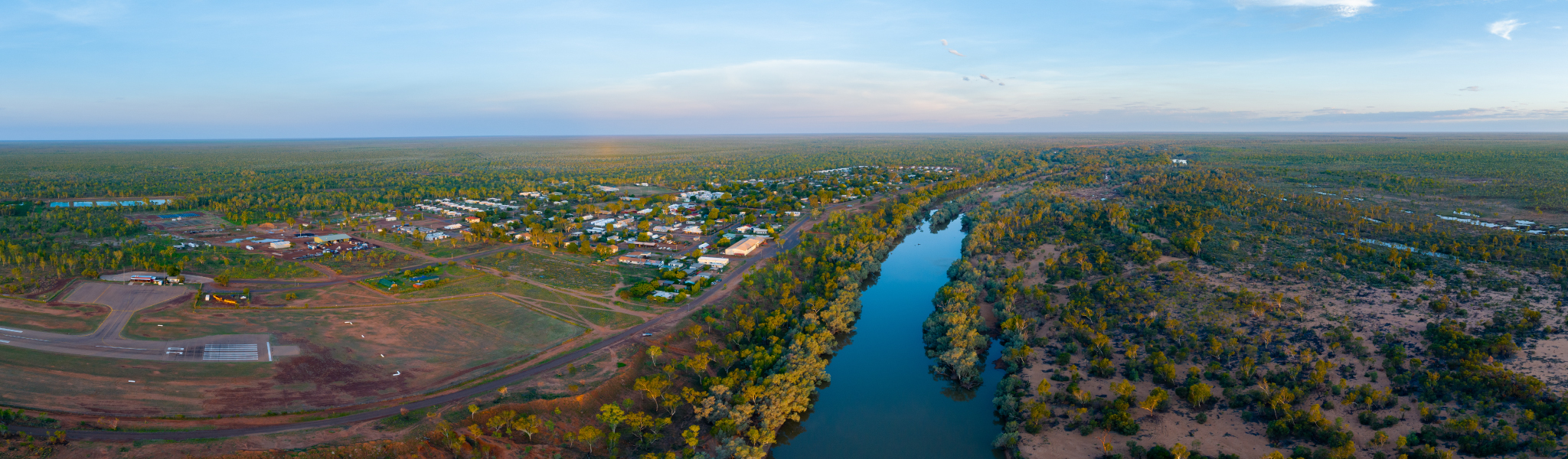
- Doomadgee, 2025

- Interactive map of Doomadgee
- Coordinates: 17.9443°S 138.8300°E
- Country: Australia
- State: Queensland
- LGA: Aboriginal Shire of Doomadgee
- Location: 141 km (88 mi) W of Burketown; 514 km (319 mi) N of Mount Isa; 996 km (619 mi) W of Cairns; 2,246 km (1,396 mi) NW of Brisbane

Government
  - State electorate: Traeger
  - Federal division: Kennedy

Population
  - Total: 1,387 (2021 census)
- Postcode: 4830
Localities around Doomadgee
Nicholson	Nicholson	Nicholson
Nicholson	Doomadgee	Nicholson
Lawn Hill	Lawn Hill	Lawn Hill

Doomadgee is an outback town and locality in the Aboriginal Shire of Doomadgee, Queensland, Australia. It is a mostly Indigenous community, situated about 140 kilometres (87 mi) from the Northern Territory border, and 93 kilometres (58 mi) west of Burketown. The settlement began with the establishment of the Doomadgee Mission in 1933, which relocated from Bayley Point to Nicholson River in 1936. In the 2021 census, the locality of Doomadgee had a population of 1,387 people.

== History ==
=== Indigenous peoples ===
The Waanyi and Ganggalidda (Yukulta) people are the recognised Aboriginal Australian peoples who are the traditional owners for the region surrounding Doomadgee. Historically, Gadawa, Lardil, Mingginda and Garawa groups inhabited or traversed the area.

The Waanyi language (also known as Wanyi, Wanyee, Wanee, Waangyee, Wonyee, Garawa, and Wanji) is an Australian Aboriginal language of the Gulf Country. The language region includes the western parts of Lawn Hill Creek and Nicholson River, from about the boundary between the Northern Territory and Queensland, westwards towards Alexandria station, Doomadgee, and Nicholson River. It includes the local government area of the Shire of Doomadgee. Yukulta (also known as Ganggalida) is also spoken in the Gulf Country, including the in Doomadgee and Mornington Shires.

=== European settlement ===
From the late 19th century, Europeans started settling in the area, making a huge impact on the lives of the Indigenous peoples. Conflict occurred, as it did elsewhere in the Australian frontier wars. Native Police, known as yabayiri to the locals, were established at Turn Off Lagoon, which was on the Nicholson River about 26 kilometres (16 mi) west of present-day Doomadgee site, in 1889. Before this, Native Police had been at a location on Carl Creek, to the south, since 1878.

The Protector of Aboriginals was appointed on 30 Apr 1936, under the Aboriginals Protection and Restriction of the Sale of Opium Act 1897, whereby Aboriginal and Torres Strait Islander people became wards of the state. The Protector controlled the lives of Aboriginal people in Queensland until the Aborigines and Torres Strait Islanders Affairs Act 1965 came into force on 28 April 1966 and the Department of Aboriginal and Island Affairs was created, and every Clerk of the Court within the State became a District Officer.

=== Doomadgee Mission (1933–1983) ===
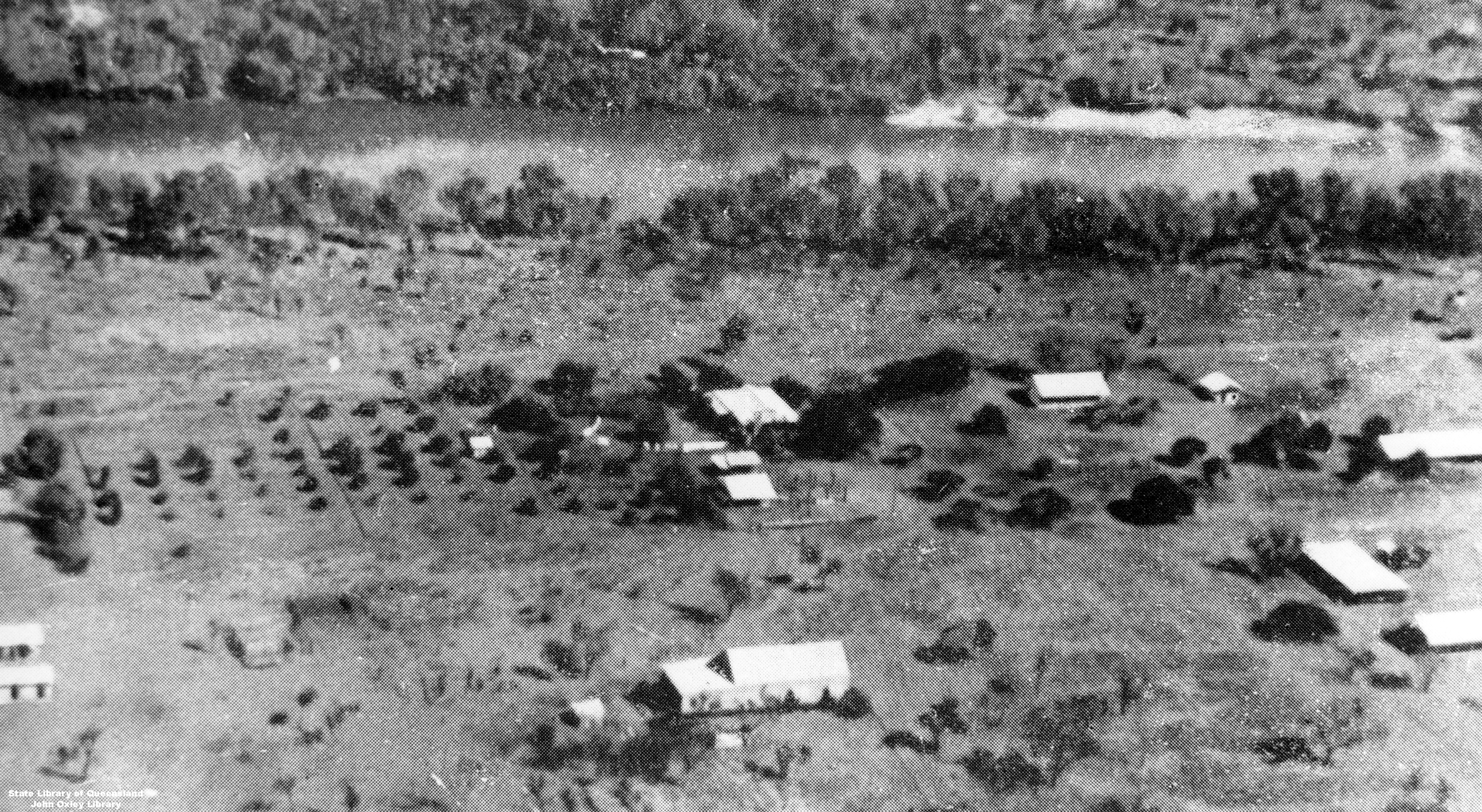
Aerial view of Doomadgee Mission, 1950 (SLQ)

Doomadgee Mission, originally known as Dumaji (a name deriving from a coastal sand dune known as Dumaji by the Ganggalidda people), was established on Bayley Point (16.9167°S 139.0333°E) on the Gulf of Carpentaria in 1933, including the Doomadgee Mission School. There had been a mission home for Aboriginal children established at Burketown by Len and Dorothy Akehurst, members of the Open Brethren, in 1930, and this was moved to the new site of Dumaji (subsequently known as "Old Doomadgee Mission" a couple of years later, at the request of the Aboriginal people. Most of the residents of Old Doomadgee came from Burketown and were Gangalidda and Garawa people. At first the girls lived in a house and the boys in tents, but dormitories were built over time. The boys and girls lived in separate dormitories. The Akehursts returned to Sydney in 1935.

After the Protector was appointed (April 1936), the mission was classed as an "Aboriginal reserve (Church-sponsored), managed by a Local Protector".

In 1936, after the coastal site of the mission had been devastated by a cyclone, the community and the dormitories were relocated to Nicholson River, known as "New Doomadgee". There were around 50 children and 20 adults at this time, but the population soon grew through the 1930s and 1940s, when the Queensland Government removed many Aboriginal families from surrounding pastoral stations, including Westmoreland, Lawn Hills and Gregory Downs. Official records show more than 80 removals between 1935 and 1957 (and prior to the establishment of Doomadgee Mission, many Aboriginal children in the region were removed to the Mornington Island Mission and other missions and Aboriginal reserves further south). A photograph held by Queensland State Archives taken around 1940 shows about 80 children at the mission, and official records report about 100 children in 1949.

The mission settlement included a hospital, a school, a cattle run which included horses, and a 26-hectare (65-acre) garden. However, government reports dated 1949 and 1950 report that there was no school building and lessons took place in the dormitories.

Here the inhabitants were subjected to close supervision and strict adherence to a Christian way of life, with the girls allowed only to sing hymns as amusement. Conditions were difficult, and the mission's practices were criticised in a 1950 government report. All children over six years old lived in dormitories; boys left the dormitory around the age of 14 to take up station work, while girls were trained in domestic duties and often remained in the dormitories until they married. By the late 1950s, many residents left, moving to the Mornington Island mission, where by this time families were allowed to stay together. A 1958 Open Brethren report showed that about 115 children aged 6–20 years were in their care.

During the 1960s, older unmarried girls started returning to their parents. The girls' dormitory was renovated in 1964, in 1965 there were still 35 boys and 23 girls living at the mission, and in 1968 there were at least five children still living in a dormitory. From 28 April 1966, the Department of Aboriginal and Island Affairs became responsible for the mission. In 1969, the Queensland Government was appointed trustee of the reserve on which the mission was located, and after continuing criticism of the conditions at the mission, it took administrative control from the Brethren in August 1983. It is not clear exactly when the last children left the dormitories. However, the contents list of a book by the Akehurst's son, Vic, shows devotes Part 5 to the 1970s and Part is titled "The Last Four years as a Mission - 1980 to 1983". The National Library of Australia has a sound recording of an interview by Gwenda Davey with Vic Akehurst about his parents, made in 2003 and available online, including a full transcript.

Doomadgee Post Office opened on 2 January 1969.

The Doomadgee Mission School, established in 1933, became Doomadgee Community School in 1970. In 1975, it came under the control of the Queensland Government's Education Department, becoming Doomadgee State School.

Two dormitory buildings still remain: the girls' dormitory and over the road from it the boys dormitory. One dormitory was destroyed by fire in 2003.

=== After the mission ===
On 21 May 1987, the Aboriginal reserve was transferred from the Queensland Government to the trusteeship of the Doomadgee Aboriginal Council, under a Deed of Grant in Trust (DOGIT).

On 1 January 2005, the Doomadgee Aboriginal Council became the Doomadgee Aboriginal Shire Council.

From January 2007, the Doomadgee Aboriginal Shire Council in the area was given full shire status.

== Demographics ==
Doomadgee is a mostly Indigenous community.

In the 2011 census, the locality of Doomadgee had a population of 1,257 people, of whom 92.9% identified as Indigenous.

In the 2016 census, the locality of Doomadgee had a population of 1,405 people, of whom 93.7% identified as Indigenous.

In the 2021 census, the locality of Doomadgee had a population of 1,387 people, of whom 89.3% identified as Indigenous.

== Education ==
Doomadgee State School is a government primary and secondary (Early Childhood–10) school for boys and girls at Goodeedawa Road (17.9420°S 138.8277°E). In 2017, the school had an enrolment of 325 students with 35 teachers and 10 non-teaching staff (7 full-time equivalent). It includes a (Prep–10) special education program.

There are no nearby schools providing education to Year 12; the alternatives are distance education and boarding school.

== Health facilities ==
There is a hospital, known as Yella Gundgimara/ Doomadgee Hospital, which as of 2021 is in the process of having six dialysis chairs installed, but the water quality is not yet good enough for their operation. Special plumbing and filtration is necessary to provide water of a specific quality to be used in the process of haemodialysis, which treats people with kidney problems. Until the unit is complete, patients have to travel or move to Mount Isa or Townsville to receive treatment. In 2022, Four Corners led an investigation into the poor health outcomes in the community, including a much higher rate of rheumatic heart disease than the wider Australian community.

== See also ==
- Doomadgee Airport
