= Shire of Burke =

Coordinates: 17°44′10″S 139°32′56″E

- Local government area
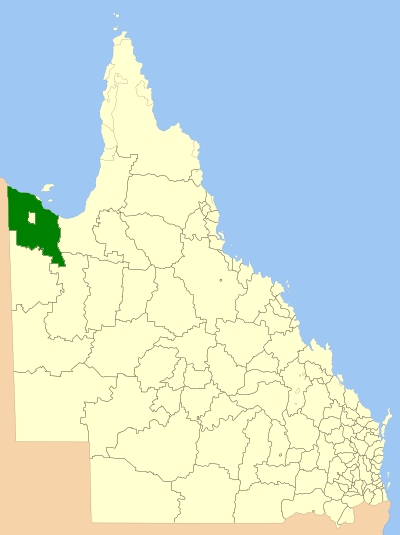
- Location within Queensland

- Interactive map of Shire of Burke
- Country: Australia
- State: Queensland
- Region: North West Queensland
- Established: 1885
- Council seat: Burketown

Government
  - Mayor: Ernie Camp
  - State electorate: Traeger
  - Federal division: Kennedy

Area +
  - Total: 39,684 km^{2} (15,322 sq mi)

Population
  - Total: 419 (2021 census)
  - Density: 0.010558/km^{2} (0.02735/sq mi)
- Website: Shire of Burke
LGAs around Shire of Burke
| Gulf of Carpentaria | Gulf of Carpentaria | Doomadgee; Mornington |
| Roper Gulf (NT) | Shire of Burke | Carpentaria |
| Barkly (NT) | Mount Isa | Cloncurry |

The Shire of Burke is a local government area in North West Queensland, Australia. The shire lies on the south coast of the Gulf of Carpentaria and abuts the border with the Northern Territory. It covers an area of 39,864 square kilometres (15,391.6 sq mi), and has existed as a local government entity since 1885. The major town and administrative centre of the shire is Burketown.

The shire and town are named in honour of ill-fated explorer Robert O'Hara Burke. The Gangalidda name for Burketown is Mungibi meaning ‘little Island’ for the fact that flooding in the wet season often isolates the town.

From the months of August to November, a rare meteorological phenomenon known as "Morning Glory" – long, tubular clouds, some up to 1000 km in length – are often observed in the skies above Burke Shire.

The shire contains Boodjamulla National Park (formerly called Lawn Hill National Park) and the World Heritage Site Riversleigh fossil fields. The Aboriginal Shire of Doomadgee lies inside Burke Shire to the west of Burketown. It also includes Gregory Downs.

In the 2021 census, the Shire of Burke had a population of 419 people.

== History ==
Yukulta (also known as Ganggalida) is an Australian Aboriginal language. The Yukulta language region is the Gulf Country including the local government areas of the Aboriginal Shire of Doomadgee and Shire of Mornington.

Yulluna (also known as Yalarnga, Yalarrnga, Jalanga, Jalannga, Wonganja, Gunggalida, Jokula) is an Australian Aboriginal language. The Yulluna language region includes the local government boundaries of the Shire of Cloncurry and other areas near the Gulf of Carpentaria.

Garrwa (also known as Garawa) is a language of the Gulf region, taking in the localities of Borroloola and Westmoreland. The Garrwa language region takes in the landscape of the Roper Gulf Regional Council and the Doomadgee Shire Council.

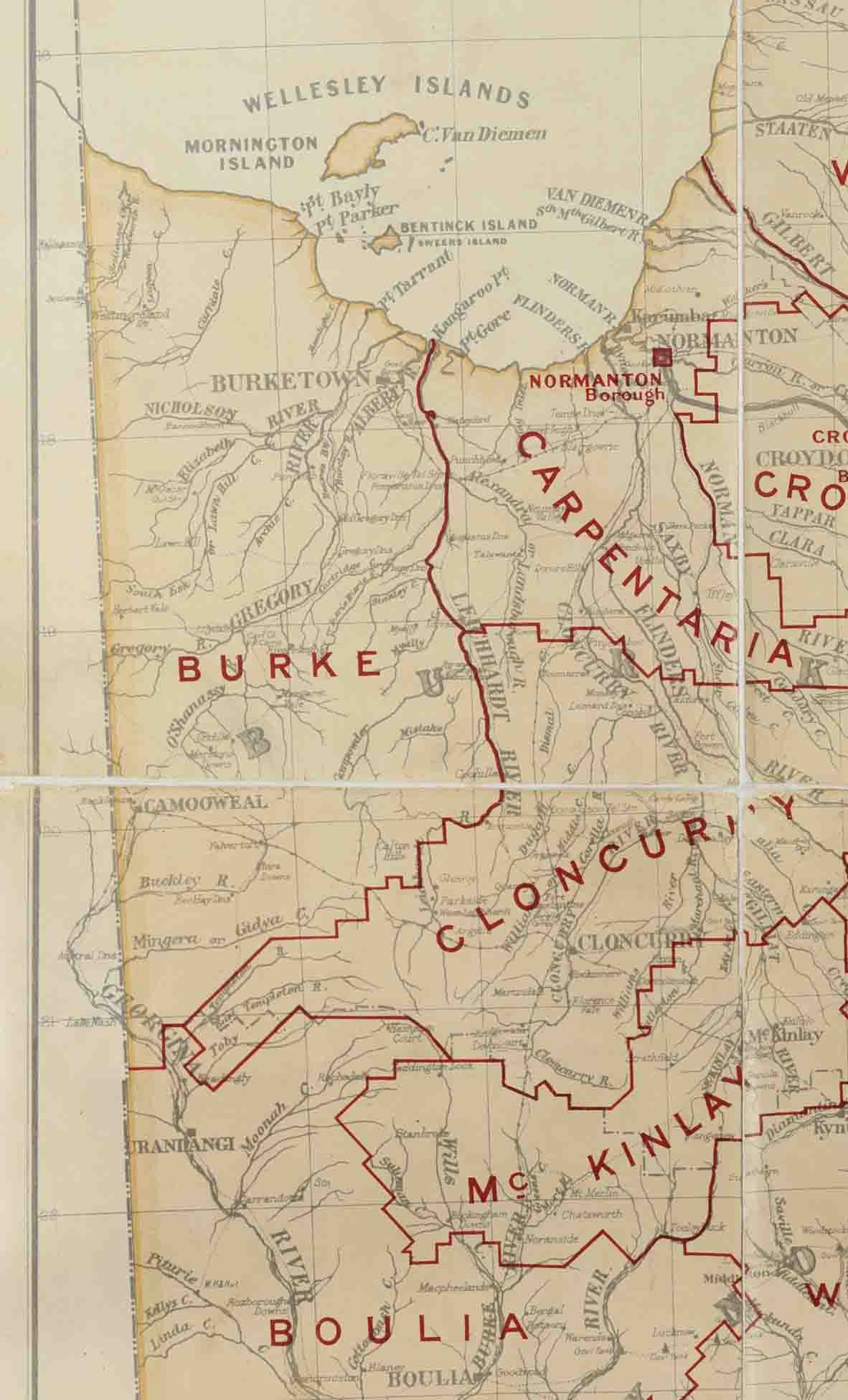
Map of Burke Division, March 1902

The Doonmunya Division was created on 11 November 1879 as one of 74 divisions around Queensland under the Divisional Boards Act 1879 with a population of 396. However, the divisional board appeared to be completely inactive, perhaps because the division was so large (being the area surrounding the southern part of the Gulf of Carpentaria) and was very sparsely settled. Nonetheless, some of the citizens were unhappy about this. Consequently, on 11 January 1883, the Doonmunya Division was abolished and a new Carpentaria Division was created to replace it.

However, once the Carpentaria Divisional Board became operational, the residents of the Burketown area became concerned that their rates were likely to be spent on the Normanton area rather than their own and began to agitate for their own division west of the Leichhardt River. On 30 January 1885, the Burke Division was created from lands formerly within the Carpentaria Division with some adjustments to the Cloncurry Division.

On 31 March 1903, Burke Division became the Shire of Burke.

== Towns and localities ==
The Shire of Burke includes the following settlements:

- Burketown
- Gidya
- Gregory
- Lawn Hill
- Nicholson

== Escott ==
Escott Station derives its name from its 1869 ownership by the English, Scottish, Australian Pastoral Co. In 1942, an American Liberator bomber crashed at Moonlight Creek, which was then a part of Escott. As the cattle station became less viable in the 1970s, it was opened up to tourists, and the Escott Barramundi Lodge was established in 1979. The homestead is located at 17°43'59"S, 139°25'0"E, and there is an airstrip. It no longer functions as tourist accommodation.

== Amenities ==
The Burke Shire Council operate public library in Burketown.

== Chairmen and mayors ==
- 1927: F. T. Webber
- 2008–2012: Annie Clarke
- 2012–present : Ernest J (Ernie) Camp

== Demographics ==
The populations below exclude the Aboriginal community of Doomadgee, which hovered between 800 and 1000 residents for most of the period under consideration.

| Year | Population | Notes |
|---|---|---|
| 1933 | 355 | |
| 1947 | 250 | |
| 1954 | 248 | |
| 1961 | 361 | |
| 1966 | 291 | |
| 1971 | 384 | |
| 1976 | 413 | |
| 1981 | 466 | |
| 1986 | 511 | |
| 1991 | 513 | |
| 1996 | 660 | |
| 2001 census | 2,129 | |
| 2006 census | 498 | |
| 2011 census | 514 | |
| 2016 census | 328 | |
| 2021 census | 419 | |
