= Proto-Australian language =

Reconstructed ancestor of the Australian language family

Proto-Australian
- PA
- Reconstruction of: Australian languages
- Region: Top End, Northern Australia
- Era: 12,000 to 6,000 BP
- Lower-order reconstructions: Proto-Pama-Nyungan; Proto-Nyulnyulan; Proto-Mirndi

Proto-Australian (PA) is the proposed common ancestor of nearly all Australian Aboriginal languages. (Note: Languages thought not to descend from Proto-Australian include Meriam Mir, which is a Papuan language; Tiwi; and the Tasmanian languages, all spoken on islands.) It is hypothesised to have been spoken sometime between 12,000 and 6,000 years ago. A comprehensive reconstruction was published in 2024.

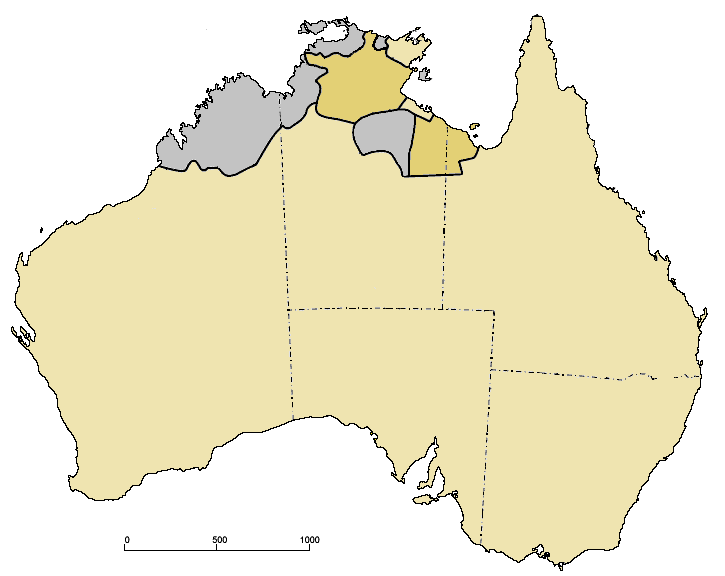
The Pama–Nyungan languages (tan) occupy the majority of the continent while many non-Pama–Nyungan language families (mustard and grey) occupy the remainder.

The Australian mainland is home to at least 250 distinct languages. Serious study of the Australian languages by trained linguists dates from the beginning of the twentieth century. A Vienna-based Catholic priest, Wilhelm Schmidt, was the first to attempt to classify Australian languages into different groups, using the limited material then available. Arthur Capell was the first to suggest one ancestral language for the entire continent, which he termed "Common Australian", in 1956.

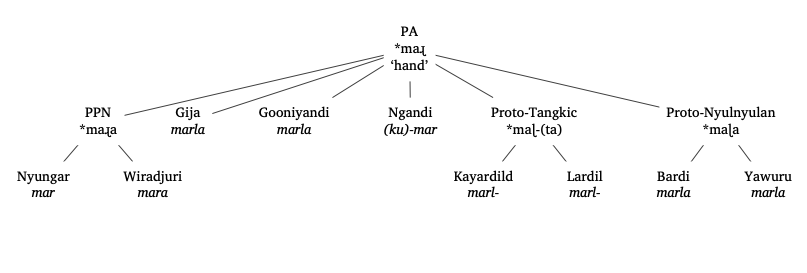
Cognates of the word for 'hand' in a number of Australian languages

Since the 1960s, most specialists have agreed that the majority of Australian languages belong to a single language family, named Pama-Nyungan (PN). The Pama-Nyungan languages, which stretch across approximately seven eighths of the continent, from the rainforests of the Cape York Peninsula in the north east, across the deserts of the interior to the southwesternmost extremity of Western Australia, are believed to descend from a single ancestral language, Proto-Pama-Nyungan, spoken thousands of years ago. This language has been partly reconstructed.

The remaining languages occupy the remaining eighth of the continent, including Arnhem Land, the Kimberly region, and the Gulf Country west of the Gulf of Carpentaria. These languages have been classified into many separate families, sometimes termed "non-Pama-Nyungan" (NPN) as a term of convenience. While the non-Pama-Nyungan languages are distinct from each other, and from Pama-Nyungan, there are certain similarities, for example the use of pronoun prefixes, that suggest that they, and the Pama-Nyungan languages, descend from an even older language. This language is called Proto-Australian.

The earliest attempts to reconstruct Proto-Australian focused on PN languages. More recently, comparative work on NPN languages has assisted in identifying aspects of the ancestral language, which can be assumed to be grammatically more similar to non-Pama-Nyungan languages than to the Pama-Nyungan languages. Despite the diversity of the linguistic picture, a common set of noun class prefixes, ancestral to both Pama-Nyungan and Non-Pama-Nyungan, was reconstructed using the comparative method in 2017, providing evidence for Proto-Australian. This was then extended to a book-length reconstruction of Proto-Australian, published in 2024.

== History of the proposal ==
The Australian mainland is home to more than 250 distinct languages. While these languages are diverse, it has long been recognised that they share important phonological, grammatical and semantic similarities and are likely all genetically related.

Some attempts were made in the nineteenth century to establish relations between Australian languages, but these were based on isolated wordlists and are considered "amateurish" by modern linguists.

Rigorous study of Australian languages began with the twentieth century. In 1919, Wilhelm Schmidt was the first scholar to systematically survey the languages of the whole continent. Schmidt created various groupings for Australian languages, which he did not term "families". He argued that the "southern" languages were clearly related to each other, while the "northern" languages were not. Schmidt's work, based in many cases on very limited available evidence, was "heroic" but is now considered outdated. Arthur Capell was a pioneer in classifying the typology of Australian languages, but also in proposing that all Australian languages, no matter their typological differences, belong to a single family, which he called 'Common Australian' in 1937. He subsequently (in 1956) suggested the importance of common verb forms in reconstructing this hypothetical ancestor. During his career Capell made important observations about the typological differences between Australian languages and how these might have come about.

=== Typological issues ===
For some time linguists have classified Australian languages into two broad typological groups. Languages of the first group are dependent-marking, relying heavily or exclusively on suffixation, and lack grammatical gender. These languages are sometimes called "suffixing" languages, and are typical of the Pama-Nyungan (PN) family, which covers approximately seven-eighths of the continent. It is generally assumed that Proto-Pama-Nyungan (PPN) was of this type. The second type of languages is head marking, usually with a complex of bound pronouns prefixed to the verb, and makes use of a number of what are called noun classes or grammatical genders. (Note: Typically four categories: masculine, feminine, vegetable, and inanimate, as found in the Mirndi languages, although some languages have more or fewer categories.) These languages are commonly termed "prefixing" languages.

The only "prefixing" Pama-Nyungan language is Yanyuwa; all other prefixing languages, geographically occupying the remaining eighth of the continent, have been classified into over twenty separate families. (Note: In some cases, such as the Mirndi languages, what were originally prefixes have become suffixes, possibly due to their use with demonstratives that later became fused to their heads.)

The continent-wide classification of Australian languages into Pama-Nyungan and assorted non-Pama-Nyungan families relies particularly on the work of Kenneth L. Hale, Geoffrey O'Grady, Carl Voegelin, Florence M. Voegelin and Stephen Wurm, published between 1966 and 1977. This classification posited that all Australian languages (excluding Meriam Mir and the Tasmanian languages) ultimately formed a single genetic group. This classification was expressly designed as "provisional", but nonetheless became widely accepted.

A question for Australian comparative linguistics then became the nature of the relationship, if any, between the prefixing, non-Pama-Nyungan languages, and the Pama-Nyungan languages.

=== Pama-Nyungan, diffusion, and Dixon's position ===
PA and PPN forms. (Note: Harvey and Mailhammer propose that PA allowed monosyllables, while PPN required forms of a minimum of two syllables, meaning that certain PA monosyllabic forms were extended in PPN.)
	PA	PPN
bad	*war	*wara
food	*maj	*maji
hand	*maɻ	*maɻa
1.sg obl.	*ŋar	*ŋara
thigh	*t̪ar	*cara
tooth	*tir	*tira

In 1980 R. M. W. Dixon, a central figure in Australian linguistics, published The Languages of Australia, in which he asserted "all but two or three of the 200 languages of Australia can be shown to belong to one language family - the 'Australian family.'" Dixon provided some phonological and morphological reconstructions of what he terms "Proto-Australian" in this volume. Because the set of languages that he was using as a source was largely Pama-Nyungan languages, most linguists consider that these reconstructions are more appropriately treated as reconstructions of Proto-Pama-Nyungan. Dixon's position, meanwhile, is that there was no basis for assuming Pama-Nyungan is a genetic grouping, and the distinction between "Pama-Nyungan" and "non-Pama-Nyungan" is purely typological and not genetic.

In 2002, Dixon published Australian Languages: Their Nature and Development. In this volume he revised his earlier assessment that all Australian languages could be proven to be genetically related. Instead he argues forcefully that phonological, morphological, and lexical diffusion in Australia is so pervasive and the time depths involved are so vast that it is impossible to use the comparative method to reconstruct any large-scale family relationships. He continues to argue that the idea of Pama-Nyungan as a clade is "totally without foundation".

Most other linguists reject Dixon's conclusions as to the validity of Pama-Nyungan or the comparative method in Australia. In 2004 Geoffrey O'Grady and Kenneth L. Hale (Note: Hale's contribution was published posthumously.) wrote that Dixon's position is "extravagant and spectacularly erroneous (...) so bizarrely faulted, and such an insult to the eminently successful practitioners of Comparative Method linguistics in Australia, that it positively demands a decisive riposte." Nicholas Evans argues that there is no evidence for Dixon's assertion that around 50% of the vocabulary of neighbouring Australian languages reflected patterns of diffusion and that morphological and phonological "evidence for Pama-Nyungan has, in fact, been slowly adding up over the last four decades".

In their 2024 reconstruction of Proto-Australian, Harvey and Mailhammer argue that "the available materials do not support" proposals for unusually widespread diffusion and "there is no evidence that any of lexical, morphological, or phonological diffusion have been of unusual frequency in Australia."

=== The status of the non-Pama-Nyungan languages within Australian languages ===
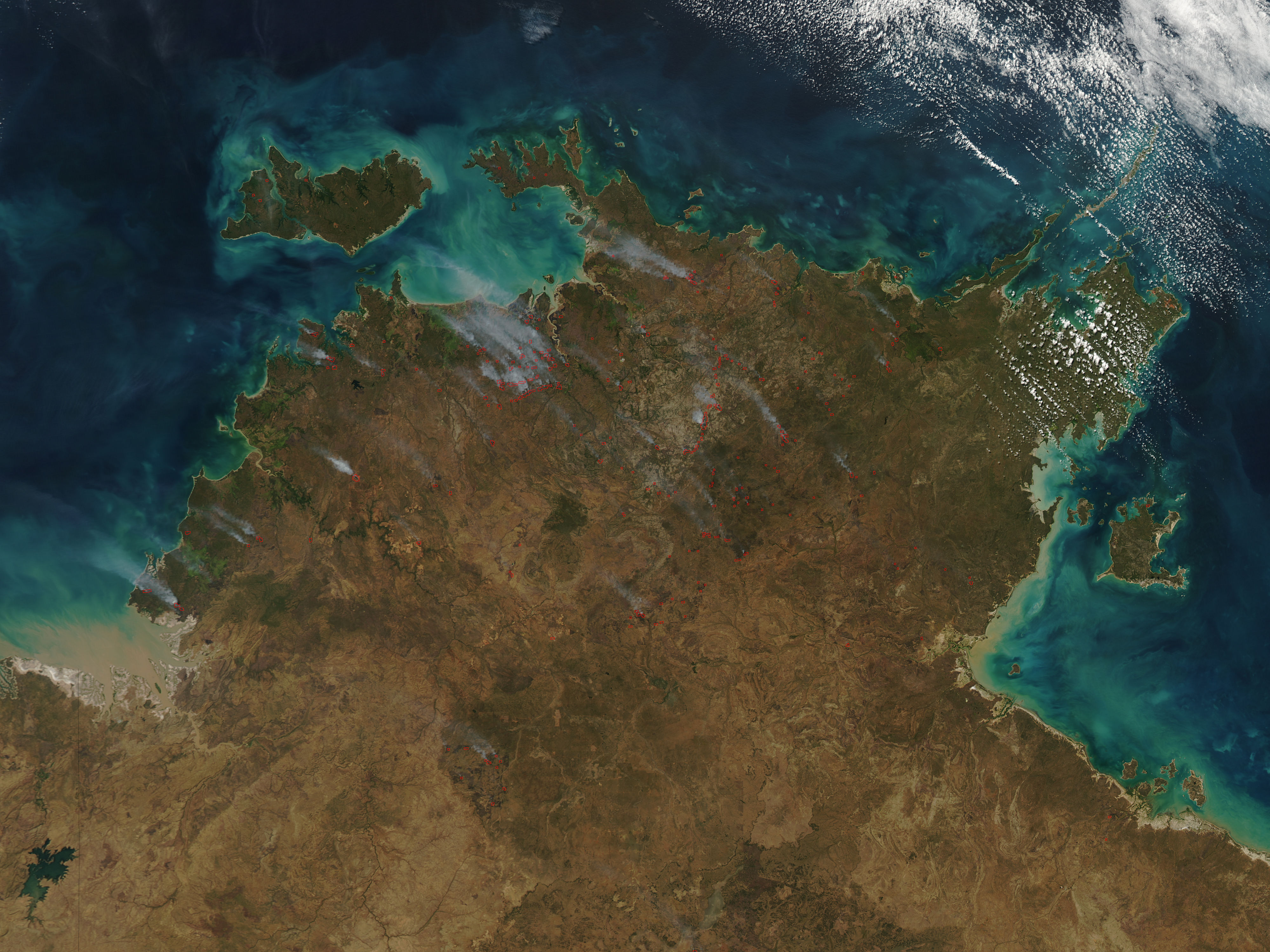
The Top End is home to the greatest level of diversity of Australian languages, possibly indicating that the Australian family originally spread from this region.

In 2003, Evans set out the possibilities for higher-order subgrouping among the Australian languages:

- The "rake" model; Pama-Nyungan is one clade of Australian languages, but the over twenty separate families of non-Pama-Nyungan cannot be classified into a single larger genetic group.
- The "diffusion" model, whereby Proto-Australian was a suffixing language typologically close to Proto-Pama-Nyungan, and the prefixing languages have all acquired a head-marking, prefixing typology through their geographic proximity to each other (as per Dixon). Evans rejects this analysis.
- The "binary" model, where essentially Pama-Nyungan and the non-Pama-Nyungan languages are two separate, equal nodes from the same tree. A problem with this model is that it does not account for the relative lack of diversity in Pama-Nyungan compared to the diversity found in non-Pama-Nyungan.
- The "Pama-Nyungan offshoot model", which Evans attributes to Geoffrey O'Grady. This is that idea that "Pama-Nyungan was a relatively recent daughter node within a larger Stammbaum containing most extant Australian languages. Of the attested Australian languages he excluded only Anindilyakwa and the Tasmanian languages from membership in a lineage descended from 'Original Australian.'" On this understanding, Proto-Australian is more likely to share typological characteristics with the non-Pama-Nyugan languages, while characteristic Pama-Nyungan features are more likely to be innovations. Most of the early work on Australian languages focused on Pama-Nyungan languages, but as more high-quality material has become available on non-Pama-Nyungan languages, any similarities that non-Pama-Nyungan languages share assume greater importance in reconstructing Proto-Australian.

Reflecting this fourth conception, in the same volume Mark Harvey posited a reconstruction of ancestral pronominal prefixes based on comparison of non-Pama-Nyungan languages. While not identifying the putative ancestral language, Harvey argued that "reconstruction of a set of proto-prefixes for a proto-language ancestral to most if not all the non-Pama-Nyungan languages obviously has implications for historical linguistics more generally in Australia."

A significant development came in 2017. (Note: Compare Claire Bowern's observation, published in 2017, that "the time is right to make a new assessment of Proto-Australian and potential subfamilies.") Harvey and Robert Mailhammer published a list of noun class prefixes based on non-Pama-Nyungan languages that could be traced back to Proto-Australian, a dependent-marking, prefixing language. In 2024, Harvey and Mailhammer published a book-length reconstruction of Proto-Australian which included some modifications, revising their earlier analysis to claim that PA noun class markers were optional proclitics rather than compulsory prefixes.

Cognates across discontinuous Australian languages
gloss	PA	PPN	Proto-Nyulnyulan	Proto-Tangkic	Arnhem
'hand'	*maɻ	*maɻa	*maɭa	*maɭ-ta	Ngandi ku-maɭ
'left hand'	*t̪aku	*caku		*t̪aku	Bininj Gunwok kun-cakku
'I, me'	*ŋaj	*ŋaj	*ŋaju		Burarra ŋaj-ppa
'spear' (Note: Verb root.)	*ta-n	*ɻa	*ɻa	*ɭaa	Burarra ra
'scold'	*t̪u-n	*t̪u-n	*ci	*t̪uu	Bininj Gunwok tu

== Location and time depth ==
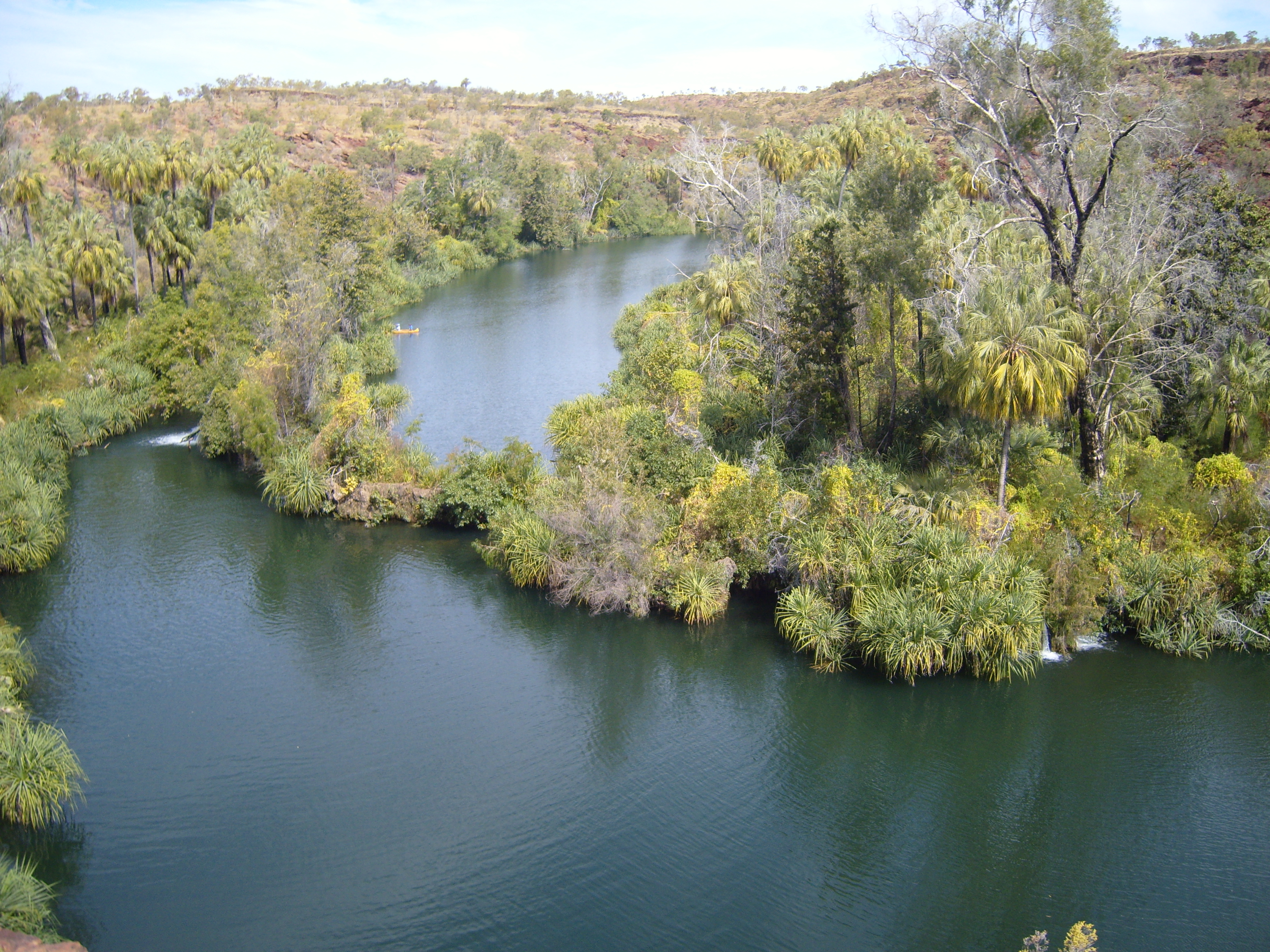
Indarri Falls at Boodjamulla National Park. The area around the southwestern Gulf Country and the Barkly Tableland is hypothesised to be a homeland of Proto-Pama-Nyungan, postdating the breakup of Proto-Australian.

The Australian continent has been inhabited by humans for at least 50,000 years. While Australian Aboriginal people are sometimes described as having "the world's oldest living culture", this does not imply thousands of years of stasis. It is clear that Aboriginal cultures were dynamic and that culture and language changed in response to changing environmental and social conditions. The language reconstructed as "Proto-Australian" is estimated to have been spoken approximately some time between 6,000 to 12,000 years before the present, most likely in the Top End.

The exact mechanism by which Proto-Australian and its descendants spread over the continent, displacing earlier languages, is unknown as there is no corresponding archaeological or genetic evidence yet discovered that could explain the process.

Harvey and Mailhammer propose that Proto-Pama-Nyungan remained unified for some time post the breakup of Proto-Australian, given its shared innovative features, and that the break-up and spread of Proto-Pama-Nyungan was a distinct event to the earlier break-up and spread of Proto-Australian. The geographic origin of Proto-Pama-Nyungan is hypothesised to be around the south-western Gulf of Carpentaria, possibly neighbouring Proto-Tangkic and Minkin. The timing and mechanism of the spread of Pama-Nyungan across most of the continent are still an "enigma".

== Classification ==
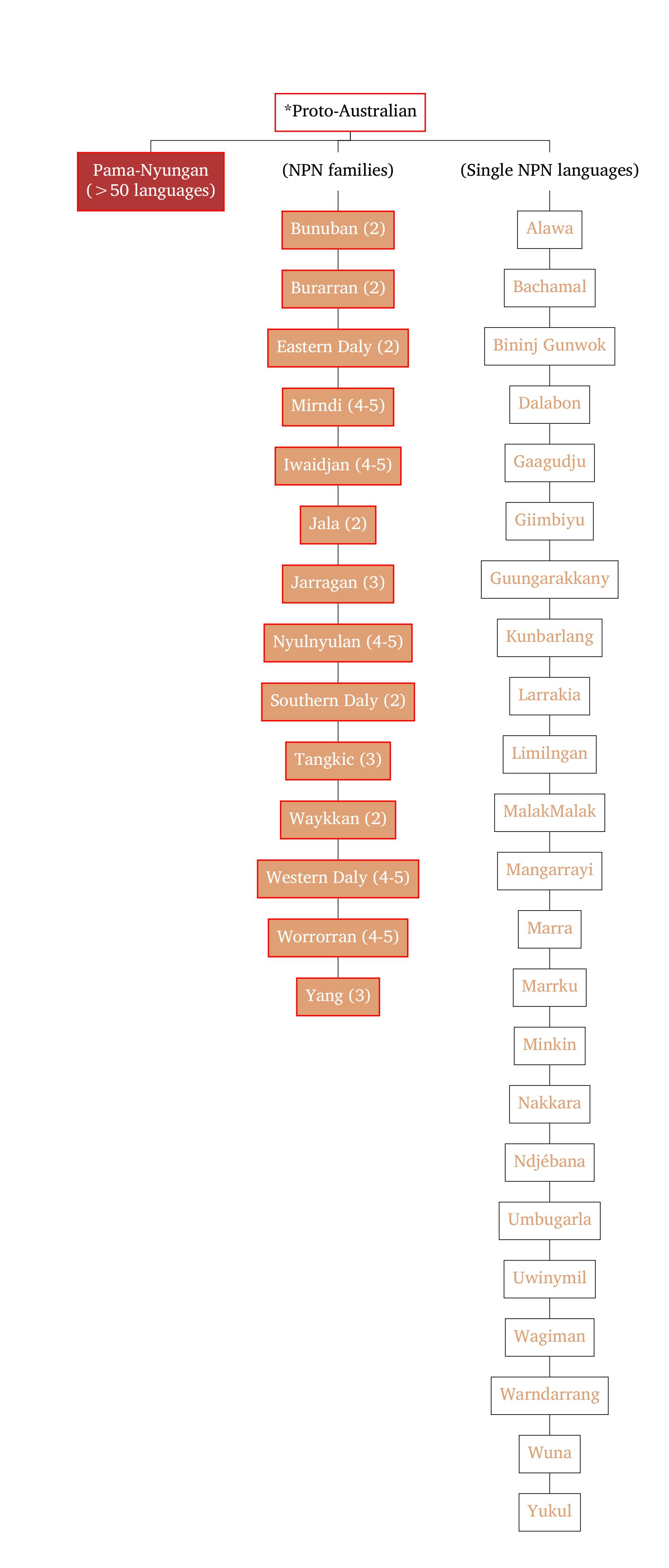
Australian language families according to Harvey and Mailhammer's 2024 proto-Australian proposal. The large majority are classified as Pama-Nyungan, with the remainder classified into 14 much smaller families, or as 24 individual descendants of Proto-Australian.

Harvey and Mailhammer reconstruct a total of 39 first-order subgroups for PA, including 24 family-level isolates.

Their proposal assesses Pama-Nyungan as the only large family grouping below the Proto-Australian level, with all their other proposed groupings having between two and five languages each.

- Proto-Australian
  - Pama-Nyungan
    - (many languages)
  - Bunuban
    - Bunuba
    - Gooniyandi
  - Burrarran
    - Burrarra
    - Gurr-goni
  - Eastern Daly
    - Kamu
    - Matngele
  - Iwaidjan
    - Amurdak
    - Garig/Ilgar
    - Iwaidja
    - Mawng
  - Jala
    - Ngalakgan
    - Rembarrnga
  - Jarragan languages
    - Gajirrabeng
    - Gija
    - Miriwoong
  - Mirndi
    - Jaminjung/Ngaliwurru
    - Jingulu
    - Ngarnka
    - Nungali
    - Wambaya
  - Nyulnyulan
    - Bardi
    - Nimanburru
    - Nyulnyul
    - Warrwa
    - Wunambul
  - Southern Daly
    - Murrinhpatha
    - Ngan'giwumirri
  - Tangkic
    - Ganggalida
    - Lardil
    - Yukulta
  - Waykkan
    - Jawoyn
    - Warray
    - Worrwolam
  - Western Daly
    - Emmi
    - Marranunggu
    - Marramaninjdji
    - Marringarr
    - Marrithiyel
  - Worrorran
    - Ungarinyin
    - Unggumi
    - Worrorra
    - Wunambal
  - Yang
    - Anindilyakwa
    - Ngandi
    - Wubuy
  - Alawa
  - Bachamal
  - Bininj Gunwok
  - Dalabon
  - Gaagudju
  - Giimbiyu
  - Gungarakkany
  - Kunbarlang
  - Larrakia
  - Limilngan
  - MalakMalak
  - Mangarrayi
  - Marra
  - Marrku
  - Minkin
  - Nakkara
  - Ndjébbana
  - Umbugarla
  - Uwinymil
  - Wagiman
  - Wardaman
  - Warndarrang
  - Wulna
  - Yugul

They reject several proposed non-Pama-Nyungan families of the Top End, including Core Gunwinyguan and Macro-Gunwinyguan (which Harvey had previously been involved in reconstructing). Harvey and Mailhammer argue instead that the characteristic forms of this proposed family are shared retentions from PA that do not distinguish it from other languages, although the grouping does seem notably high in PA retentions. Harvey and Mailhammer also propose two new family-level classifications: Yang and Waykkan.

Harvey and Mailhammer consider that the Tasmanian languages and Tiwi are not related to Proto-Australian. They accept the validity of Pama-Nyungan as a family on the basis of shared innovations from PA but note that Proto-Pama-Nyungan does not yet have a full reconstruction and that first-order subgroups of Pama-Nyungan have not yet been established.

== Phonology ==
According to Harvey and Mailhammer, proto-Australian exhibited a phonological structure that is generally in keeping with the typical patterns in Australian languages.

=== Consonants ===
	Labial	Alveolar	Retroflex	Laminal	Velar
Stop	p	t	ʈ	t̪ c	k
Nasal	m	n	ɳ	ɲ	ŋ
Lateral		l	ɭ		
Trill		r			
Approximant	w		ɻ	j	

The "greatest complexity in reconstruction" is the laminal stop. Harvey and Mailhammer resort to classifying *[c] and *[t̪] as a single phoneme, but write it with two separate symbols "as this facilitates discussion of the diachrony".

=== Vowels ===
Australian languages most often have a vowel system based on either three or five cardinal vowels.

Harvey and Mailhammer reconstruct five vowels for the proto-language, with no length distinction. Based on their analysis that frontedness is not a synchronically active category in Australian languages, they propose that PA had two phonological features: + or - high/low, or + or - rounded.

Reconstructed pA vowels
	-Round		+Round
+High	i		u
	e	o	
+Low		a	

== Morphology ==
=== Noun classes ===
Harvey and Mailhammer reconstruct that PA had three animate classes: *ci= 'Masculine', *ciɲ= 'Feminine' and *ta= 'Animal' and two inanimate classes: *ma= 'Vegetation' (Note: Grammars of some Australian languages describe this category as 'vegetable food'. Harvey and Mailhammer however argue that it is semantically more justifiable that the category in PA refers to all plants and plant products, whether edible or not.) and *ku= 'Neuter'.

Harvey and Mailhammer hypothesise that the noun classes were marked by optional proclitics, which in turn derive ultimately from the extensive use of delimiting generic nouns in Australian languages. The idea that the class markers were optional clitics revises their 2017 proposal, which suggested that the class markers formed an agreement system, appearing on modifiers such as adjectives and demonstratives but not on heads.

=== Case clitics ===
Australian languages are characterised by more or less elaborate systems of grammatical case, typically marked on nouns via suffixes. Harvey and Mailhammer reconstruct three PA case suffixes: *-ku 'Dative', *-kana 'Genitive,' and *-ji, which functions to mark both ergative case and instrumental (Note: these cases normally pattern together in Australian languages.) and possibly also comitative. Another possible ergative suffix, *-t̪u, probably does not date back to PA, although it may go back to PPN.

=== Pronouns ===
PA is reconstructed as having separate bound and free pronouns. Among the free pronouns, there is a distinction between oblique and absolutive forms. Reconstructed free pronouns include *ŋaj for first person singular absolutive, and *ŋat̪a for third person feminine singular absolutive.

=== Clitic complex and verb argument marking ===
In Harvey and Mailhammer's reconstruction, finite clauses in PA contained an obligatory 'clitic complex' that contained bound pronominal markers indexing clausal arguments, as well as modal information. The clitic complex did not appear in non-finite clauses. (Note: This arrangement is seen in some modern Australian languages. Mailhammer and Harvey state that their reconstruction is 'very similar' syntactically to Warlpiri.)

This complex originally appeared in first or second clausal position, but later would become attached to verbs, evolving into the complex verbal prefixation systems seen in most non-Pama-Nyungan languages. Both Pama-Nyungan and Tangkic are theorised to have lost this grammatical element because PA's finite clause structures were largely lost in these branches, and their verbal morphology developed from what were originally non-finite verb forms in PA.

Pronoun clitics are divided into two grammatical numbers: minimal and augmented, and two cases in the minimal: absolutive and ergative. Third person objects would take a class marker clitic. Usually only animates were agents, so inanimate ergative forms cannot be reconstructed.

The PA augmented number pronouns used suppletive forms but redundantly also required the augmented number marker *ra=.

PA bound minimal pronouns (Note: Based on data from Harvey and Mailhammer.)
	abs. min.	erg. min.	augmented
1	*ŋa=	?*ar=	?
1+2	*ma=	*ma=	?
2	?	*t̪V=	*nuŋku=
3masc.	*Ø=, *ci=	*Ø=, *ni=	*pV=
3fem.	*Ø=, *ciɲ=	*Ø=, *ŋaji=	*pV=
3anim.	*Ø=, *ta=	?	*pV=
3veg.	*Ø=, *ma=	?	*pV=
3neut.	*Ø=, *ku=	?	*pV=

Mailhammer and Harvey note that first and second person pronoun forms are often subject to remodelling and syncretism in Australian language, due in part to pragmatic difficulties associated with direct address.

=== Verbs and TAM inflection ===
Verbs in Australian languages use suffixes to encode tense, aspect and mood (TAM) information. Proto-Australian TAM suffixation has a long and complex internal history. Harvey and Mailhammer use internal reconstruction to explain the historical development of TAM inflection across conjugations.

In nearly all Australian languages, there are one or two conjugation classes that contain a large number of verbs, and a number of other conjugation classes containing a small number of verbs.

In Pama-Nyungan languages, some verbs exhibit distinctive stem changes across paradigms, usually based around the presence or absence of particular consonants, which cannot be attributed to either the verb root or (synchronically) TAM suffixes. These consonants are sometimes called "conjugation markers" or "consonantal augments". The conjugation markers have been used for the purposes of determining relationships between different languages. In his 1980 reconstruction of "Proto-Australian", Dixon proposed that verbs had a simple root+TAM inflection template, and conjugation markers were originally the final consonant segments of verbal roots, modified by subsequent sound changes.

The current favoured analysis is that the presence or absence of these segments reflect historical progression from an ancestral conjugation system that had many irregularities and idiosyncrasies into a system that featured more regular patterns. The development of verbal inflection in Australian languages in this respect is somewhat analogous to the history of the Proto-Indo-European verb. Conjugation markers, in this analysis, derive not from verbal roots but from TAM suffixes, and a historical process whereby new verbal stems were created from existing inflected forms, and then subject to reanalysis to create the conjugational system found in PN.

Many Australian languages use complex predicates, created with the use of coverbs. The use of coverbs can be traced back to PA, with the ending *-j marking non-finite coverbs. In some languages, use of complex predicate structures has developed to the extent that inflecting verbs are a closed class. This means that over time, inflecting verbs have a tendency to fall out of use, making verbs and their inflectional patterns harder to trace.

Broadly, the reconstruction of Harvey and Mailhammer is of a verbal system that originally distinguished aspect and was remodelled over time to later distinguish tense. (Note: A similar development is hypothesised for Proto-Indo-European verbs.) The result was a verbal system that distinguished between present perfective, past perfective, and past imperfective, among other categories. The imperative mood continued to make use of the bare present root with a null ending, while other TAM categories were created by adding additional suffixes to what was originally the present, creating new verbal stems. This ultimately gave rise to a "secondary present" with a present meaning but different suffix patterns. The final stage of evolution of TAM inflection is summarised in the following table.

Late stage PA verbal inflection
TAM Category	Stem	Suffix
Past Perfective	Root	*-m, *-ɲ, *-j, *-ŋ, *-ŋaɲ
Past Imperfective	Present	*-ta(ɲ), *-ŋ, *-j
Present	Root	*-n, *-ɭ, *-ŋ
Secondary Present	Word-level form	*ʈa, *-ca, *(-ke)
Imperative	Root	*-Ø
Gerund	Root	*-n
Coverb	Root	*-j

Certain TAM categories that exist in Australian languages - such as future tense and evitative - are theorised to also exist in PA but their formation differs so widely in descendant languages that these suffixes have not been reconstructed.

== Citations ==
=== Sources ===
- "Languages alive". AIATSIS.
- Alpher, Barry (1990). "Some Proto-Pama-Nyungan paradigms: A Verb in the Hand is Worth Two in the Phylum". In O'Grady, Geoffrey; Tryon, Darrell (eds.). Studies in Comparative Pama-Nyungan. Pacific Linguistics. pp. 155–171.
- Alpher, Barry; Evans, Nicholas; Harvey, Mark (2003). "Proto Gunwinyguan verb suffixes". In Evans, Nicholas (ed.). The non-Pama-Nyungan languages of northern Australia: comparative studies of the continent's most linguistically complex region. Pacific Linguistics. pp. 305–352. ISBN 0 85883 538 X.
- Bowern, Claire (13 March 2018). "The origins of Pama-Nyungan, Australia's largest family of Aboriginal languages". The Conversation. doi:10.64628/AA.gna3xfhpa.
- Alpher, Barry (2004). "Pama-Nyungan: Phonological Reconstruction and Status as a Phylogenetic Group". In Bowern, Claire; Koch, Harold (eds.). Australian Languages : Classification and the Comparative Method. John Benjamins Publishing Company. pp. 93–126. ISBN 9789027295118.
- Bowern, Claire (2017). "Language Isolates in Australia". In Campbell, Lyle (ed.). Language Isolates. Taylor & Francis Group. pp. 424–447. doi:10.4324/9781315750026-12. ISBN 9781317610915.
- Dixon, R. M. W. (1980). The Languages of Australia. Cambridge University Press. ISBN 978-0-521-29450-8. Archived from the original on 22 December 2019.
- Dixon, R. M. W. (2002). Australian Languages : Their Nature and Development. Cambridge University Press. ISBN 9780511148187.
- Evans, Nicholas (2005). "Australian Languages Reconsidered: A Review of Dixon (2002)". Oceanic Linguistics. 44 (1): 242–286.
- Evans, Nick; McConvell, Patrick (1998). "The enigma of Pama-Nyungan expansion in Australia". In Blench, Roger; Spriggs, Matthew (eds.). Archaeology and language II: Archaeological data and linguistic hypotheses. One World Archaeology. Vol. 29. Routledge. pp. 174–191. doi:10.4324/9780203202913. ISBN 978-0-415-11761-6.
- Evans, Nicholas (2003). "Comparative non-Pama-Nyungan and Australian historical linguistics". In Evans, Nicholas (ed.). The non-Pama-Nyungan languages of northern Australia: comparative studies of the continent's most linguistically complex region. Pacific Linguistics. pp. 3–25. ISBN 0 85883 538 X.
- Hale, Kenneth (1964). "Classification of Northern Paman Languages, Cape York Peninsula, Australia: A Research Report". Oceanic Linguistics. 3 (2): 248–265. doi:10.2307/3622881.
- Harvey, Mark (2003). "An initial reconstruction of Proto Gunwinyguan phonology". In Evans, Nicholas (ed.). The non-Pama-Nyungan languages of northern Australia: comparative studies of the continent's most linguistically complex region. Pacific Linguistics. pp. 305–352. ISBN 0 85883 538 X.
- Harvey, Mark (2003). "Reconstruction of pronominals among the non-Pama-Nyungan languages". In Evans, Nicholas (ed.). The non-Pama-Nyungan languages of northern Australia: comparative studies of the continent's most linguistically complex region. Pacific Linguistics. pp. 475–513. ISBN 0 85883 538 X.
- Harvey, Mark (2014). "The origin of conjugation markers in Australian languages". In Bowern, Claire; Evans, Bethwyn; Miceli, Luisa (eds.). Morphology and Language History: in Honour of Harold Koch. John Benjamins Publishing Company. pp. 123–139. ISBN 9789027290960.
- Harvey, Mark; Green, Ian; Nordlinger, Rachel (2006). "From Prefixes to Suffixes: Typological Change in Northern Australia". Diachronica. 23 (2): 289–311.
- Harvey, Mark; Mailhammer, Robert (2024). Proto-Australian: Reconstruction of a Common Ancestor Language. De Gruyter. ISBN 9783111421445.
- Harvey, Mark; Mailhammer, Robert (2017). "Reconstructing remote relationships: Proto-Australian noun class prefixation". Diachronica. 34 (4): 470–515. doi:10.1163/187740911x558798. Archived from the original on 17 January 2020.
- Harvey, Mark; Mailhammer, Robert (30 January 2025). "New evidence confirms our Indigenous languages have a common source, but how they spread remains a mystery". The Conversation.
- Heath, Jeffrey G., Australian Aboriginal Languages, Encyclopedia Britannica
- Koch, Harold (2004). "A Methodological History of Australian Linguistic Classification". In Bowern, Claire; Koch, Harold (eds.). Australian Languages : Classification and the Comparative Method. John Benjamins Publishing Company. pp. 17–60. ISBN 9789027295118.
- Koch, Harold (2014). "Historical relations among the Australian languages: genetic classification and contact-based diffusion". In Koch, Harold; Nordlinger, Rachel (eds.). The Languages and Linguistics of Australia: A Comprehensive Guide. De Gruyter. pp. 23–89. doi:10.1515/9783110279771. ISBN 9783110279771.
- Koch, Harold; Nordlinger, Rachel (2014). "The languages of Australia in linguistic research: context and issues". In Koch, Harold; Nordlinger, Rachel (eds.). The Languages and Linguistics of Australia: A Comprehensive Guide. De Gruyter. pp. 23–89. doi:10.1515/9783110279771. ISBN 9783110279771.
- Marchese, David (28 March 2018). "Indigenous languages come from just one common ancestor, researchers say". Australian Broadcasting Corporation. Archived from the original on 30 March 2018.
- McConvell, Patrick; Evans, Nick (1998). "The enigma of Pama-Nyungan expansion in Australia". In Blench, Roger; Springs, Matthew (eds.). Archaeology and Language II: Archaeological Data and Linguistic Hypotheses. Taylor & Francis Group. pp. 174–192.
- McConvell, Patrick; Bowern, Claire (2011). "The Prehistory and Internal Relationships of Australian Languages". Languages and Linguistics Compass. 5 (1): 19–32. doi:10.1111/j.1749-818X.2010.00257.x.
