= Nguburinji =

Aboriginal Australian people of north-west Queensland

The Nguburinji people, also written Ngoborindi, Oborindi and other variations, are an Aboriginal Australian people whose traditional lands lie in northwest Queensland.

== Country ==
According to Norman Tindale, the Nguburinji lands extended over 3,100 square miles (8,000 km^{2}) taking in the southern headwaters of the Gregory River. They were also present at what is the World Heritage fossil site of Riversleigh, Gregory Downs, and Mount Margaret. Their northern boundaries reached up to Lawn Hill Creek and Punjaub.

Their land lay to the south of the Yukulta / Ganggalidda, west of the Mingin people, east of the Waanyi, and north of the Injilarija (whose lands the Waanyi occupied around 1880, when the Injilarija became extinct ).

== Social system ==
According to Lauriston Sharp, the Nguburinji social organisation belonged to the Laierdila typology of the Australian system of kinship characterised by the Mara type of semi-moieties with a segmentary lineage, and had eight sub-sections organised as unnamed patrilineal semi-moieties and moieties.

== History of contact ==
Over time, after the advent of European colonisation, the Nguburinji shifted to the Wakabunga country around Morstone Downs.

== Language ==
Nguburinji
- Nguburindi
- Native to: Australia
- Region: Queensland
- Ethnicity: Nguburinji
- Era: attested 1897
- Language family: Macro-Pama–Nyungan?: Tangkic; Yukulta; Nguburinji

Language codes
- ISO 639-3: –
- Glottolog: ngub1238
- AIATSIS: G19

Nguburinji (Ngubirindi) is regarded as a dialect of the Yukulta (Ganggalida) language. It is in the Tangkic language group.

== Alternative names ==
- Ngoborundji, Ngoboringi
- Oborindi, Oboroondi, Obor-indi

Source Tindale 1974, p. 183:

== Sources ==
- "Information Service: Queensland: Extinguishment by pastoral lease". AMPLA Bulletin. 14 (2): 90.
- Kerwin, Dale (2011). Aboriginal Dreaming Paths and Trading Routes: The Colonisation of the Australian Economic Landscape. Sussex Academic Press. ISBN 978-1-845-19529-8.
- Roth, W. E. (1897). Ethnological Studies among the North-West-Central Queensland Aborigines (PDF). Brisbane: Edmund Gregory, Government Printer – via Internet Archive.
- Sharp, Lauriston (December 1935). "Semi-Moieties in North-Western Queensland". Oceania. 6 (2): 158–174. doi:10.1002/j.1834-4461.1935.tb00178.x. JSTOR 40327545.
- Sutton, P. (2004). Native Title in Australia: An Ethnographic Perspective. Cambridge University Press. p. 5. ISBN 978-1-139-44949-6.
- Tindale, Norman Barnett (1974). "Ngoborindi (QLD)". Aboriginal Tribes of Australia: Their Terrain, Environmental Controls, Distribution, Limits, and Proper Names. Australian National University Press.
- Trigger, David (2015). "Change and Succession in Aboriginal Claims to Land". In Toner, P.G. (ed.). Strings of Connectedness: Essays in honour of Ian Keen. Australian National University Press. pp. 53–73. ISBN 978-1-925-02263-6.
