= Yangkaal language =

Australian Aboriginal language

Yangkaal
- Nemarang, Nyangga
- Native to: Australia
- Region: Queensland
- Ethnicity: Gananggalinda (Yangkaal)
- Extinct: (date missing)
- Language family: Macro-Pama–Nyungan?: Tangkic; Kayardild–Yangkaal; Yangkaal

Language codes
- ISO 639-3: nny Yangkaal/Nyangga (two different languages covered by [nny])
- Glottolog: nyan1300
- AIATSIS: G37
- ELP: Yangkaal

The Yangkaal language, also known as Yanggaralda, Janggal, Gananggalinda, Nemarang, among other names, is an extinct Australian Aboriginal language. Geoffrey O'Grady grouped it as a variety of Yukulta within the Tangkic language family. (Note: 'Tangkic Group Jakula-Njangga (Yanggal, Nyangga).') The implication was that "Yanggal" was simply an alternative name for "Njangga", which is an alternative ethnonym for the Yanyula (Yanyuwa), from which the word Yanggal may have derived.

== Vocabulary ==
- bidinaŋga (man)
- magudaŋga (woman)
- ganda (father)
- ŋama (mother).
