= Kayardild language =

Australian Aboriginal language

Kayardild
- Kaiadilt
- Region: South Wellesley Islands, north west Queensland, Australia
- Ethnicity: Kaiadilt, Yanggal
- Native speakers: 43 (2021 census)
- Language family: Macro-Pama–Nyungan?: Tangkic; Kayardild
- Dialects: Kayardild; Yangkaal †

Language codes
- ISO 639-3: gyd
- Glottolog: kaya1319
- AIATSIS: G35 Kayardild
- ELP: Kayardild
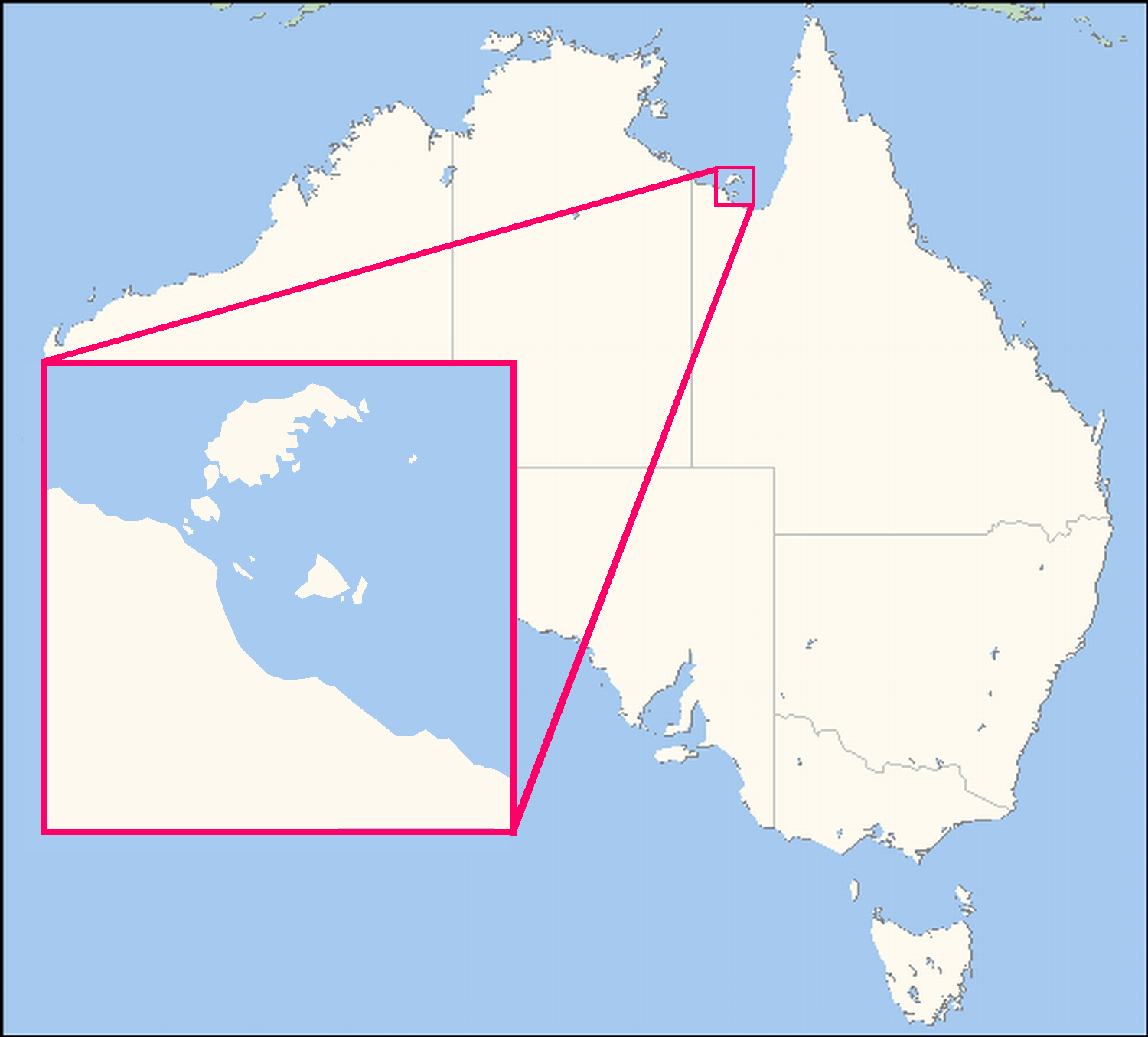
- Kayardild Traditional area

- Kayardild is classified as Critically Endangered by the UNESCO Atlas of the World's Languages in Danger.

Kayardild is a moribund Tangkic language spoken by 43 of the Kaiadilt on the South Wellesley Islands, north west Queensland, Australia. Other members of the family include Yangkaal (spoken by the Yangkaal people), Lardil, and Yukulta (Ganggalidda).

Kayardild is a critically endangered language, considered near-extinct. In 1981, there were around fifty native speakers of Kayardild. The number of speakers of Kayardild significantly reduced since the 1940s as a result of the stolen generations. By 1981, there were fifty known native speakers. In the 2016 census, there were eight, and this number increased to 43 in 2021.

== Phonology ==
Kayardild consonant phonemes
	Peripheral		Laminal		Apical	
	Bilabial	Velar	Palatal	Dental	Alveolar	Retroflex
Plosive	p	k	c	t̪	t	ʈ
Nasal	m	ŋ	ɲ	n̪	n	ɳ
Trill					r	
Lateral					l	
Approximant	w		j		ɻ	

Kayardild vowel phonemes
	Front	Back
Close	i iː	u uː
Open	a aː	

== Grammar ==
Kayardild is known for its many unusual case phenomena, including case stacking of up to four levels, the use of clause-level case to signal interclausal relations and pragmatic factors, and another set of 'verbal case' endings which convert their hosts from nouns into verbs morphologically. It is also well-known for only allowing subordination one level deep. Kayardild is the only known spoken language where tense markers appear on both nouns and verbs.

Speakers tend to have a preference for subject–object–verb word order.

== Bibliography ==
- Evans, Nick (1995a). "Current Issues in Australian languages". In Goldsmith, John A. (ed.). The Handbook of Phonological Theory. Blackwell Handbooks in Linguistics (1st ed.). Blackwell. pp. 723–761.
- Evans, Nicholas (1995b). A Grammar of Kayardild: With Historical-comparative Notes on Tangkic. Berlin: Walter de Gruyter. ISBN 978-3-11-012795-9.
