= Mingin =

Mingin may refer to:

- Mingin Township, a township of Kale District, Sagaing Region, Myanmar
  - Mingin, Myanmar, its principal town and administrative seat
- Mingin people, an Aboriginal people of Queensland, Australia
  - Mingin language or Minkin, an extinct Australian Aboriginal language
