= Yukulta =

Aboriginal Australian people of northern Queensland

The Yukulta people, also spelt Jokula, Jukula, and other variants, and also known as Ganggalidda or Gangalidda, are an Aboriginal Australian people of the state of Queensland.

They may be the same as the Yanga group.

== Country ==
Norman Tindale (1974) estimated that the Yukulta had about 5,400 square miles (14,000 km^{2}) of tribal land extending from Burketown to Hann Creek and Massacre Inlet in northern Queensland. They were also present on the coastal area to the west of Cliffdale Creek. Their inland extension was close to the Nicholson River. Their eastern frontier was on the mouth of the Albert River near Escott.

Kerwin (2011) and Trigger (2015) report that the Ganggalidda traditionally lived on the southern coast of the Gulf of Carpentaria, west of sv:Moonlight Creek. Many of their descendants now dwell in and around Mungubie (Burketown) in northern Queensland. The Garrwa people occupied land to their west, the Waanyi to their south-west, the Nguburinji to their south, and the Mingginda to the east.

=== Native Title ===
The Yukulta/Ganggalida are one of four groups who placed native title claims to coastal areas in the southern gulf region. Their claim includes the area which was originally Mingginda territory, but to which the Yukulta/Ganggalida petitioners successfully maintained that they had a right to succession. In modern Yukulta/Ganggalida tales, by virtue of many of their forebears having shifted into the area since the late 19th century, the former Mingginda sites from Burketown south through the Albert River and the lower reaches of the Nicholson River have become part of their dreamtime creation narratives.

== Language ==
The Yukulta/Ganggalidda people spoke the Yukulta language, a Tangkic language which is now extinct. Kangkalita (Ganggalidda) is reported as a word meaning "language".

== Alternative names ==
- Jugul, Jugulda
- Jogula, Jokala, Jokul, Jokal
- Iukala, Yukula, Yookala
- Eugoola
- Jungulda (Yanggal exonym)
- Kanggaleida (Yanggal term)
- Yangarella
- Engarilla

== Sources ==
- "AIATSIS map of Indigenous Australia". AIATSIS. 14 May 2024.
- Kerwin, Dale (2011). Aboriginal Dreaming Paths and Trading Routes: The Colonisation of the Australian Economic Landscape. Sussex Academic Press. ISBN 978-1-845-19529-8.
- Tindale, Norman Barnett (1974). "Jokula (QLD)". Aboriginal Tribes of Australia: Their Terrain, Environmental Controls, Distribution, Limits, and Proper Names. Australian National University Press. ISBN 978-0-708-10741-6.
- Trigger, David (2015). "Change and Succession in Aboriginal Claims to Land". In Toner, P.G. (ed.). Strings of Connectedness: Essays in honour of Ian Keen. Australian National University Press. pp. 53–73. ISBN 978-1-925-02263-6.
