= Yangkaal =

Aboriginal Australian ethnic group

The Yangkaal, also spelt Yanggal, are an Aboriginal Australian people of area of the Gulf of Carpentaria in the state of Queensland.

Gananggalinda is a variant name of the same group.

== Country ==
The Yangkaal work over 300 square miles (780 km^{2}) of land, both on Forsyth Island and the stretch of coastline opposite, on the mainland, running as far west as Cliffdale Creek mainland opposite. Much of the continental coastland used by the Yangkaal was mangrovial.

David Horton reported in The Encyclopaedia of Aboriginal Australia: Aboriginal and Torres Strait Islander history, society and culture that the traditional lands of the Gananggalinda were near Bayley Point and Point Parker on the coast of the Gulf of Carpentaria. The Gananggalinda and their neighbours the Yukulta / Ganggalidda have similar culture and language.

== Social organisation ==
The Yangkaal were composed of at least three kin groups:

- The Djo:ara (Beche-de-Mer Camp and Bayley (Robert) Island)
- Laraksnja:ra (eastern part of Forsyth Island)
- Mara'kalpa (western side of Forsyth Island)
- A clan once resident on Denham Island

== History of contact ==
The Yangkaal eventually moved to Mornington Island, where Arthur Capell briefly interviewed one informant, and obtained information, some of which turned out to be unreliable. He was told that their name for their homeland on Forsyth Island was Nemi, from which he deduced that their language was Nemarang. This misapprehension was corrected by Norman Tindale, who explained that this term was the personal name of a Yangkaal person known on the Mornington Island Mission as Edward Nemie, the latter being a distortion of the missionary's word "name". (Note: 'In 1960 on the highest authority, one of the oldest living Janggal men of Forsyth Island, I learned that Nemarang was not their name. Shortly after the Mornington Island Mission was founded and before the Reverend Wilson was killed by the aborigines, he gave names to many of the natives including Old William, the elder of the Lardiil. Djungidjarudau, father of Edward Namie, on a visit to the new Mission, heard of the new names, asked for and was given a name that he forgot after he went back to his island. The word "name" stuck with him, however, and later it crept into mission records as Namie, hence his son's second name.')

== Alternative names ==
- Njanggad
- Janggaral
- Janggura
- Janggaralda
- Jangaralda (Lardil exonym)
- Nemarang (recent autonym formed from the English word 'name')
- Balumbant ('westerners' as opposed to Lilumbant, used of the Lardiil and Yokula)

== Sources ==
- "AIATSIS map of Indigenous Australia". AIATSIS. 14 May 2024.
- Capell, Arthur (September 1942). "Languages of Arnhem Land, North Australia (Continued)". Oceania. 13 (1): 24–50. doi:10.1002/j.1834-4461.1942.tb00367.x. JSTOR 40327973.
- Dixon, Robert M. W.; Blake, Barry J., eds. (1983). Handbook of Australian Languages. Vol. 3. John Benjamins Publishing. ISBN 978-9-027-22005-9.
- O'Grady, Geoffrey; Voegelin, C. F.; Voegelin, F. M. (February 1966). "Languages of the World: Indo-Pacific Fascicle Six". Anthropological Linguistics. 8 (2): 1–197. JSTOR 30029431.
- Tindale, Norman Barnett (1974). "Janggal (QLD)". Aboriginal Tribes of Australia: Their Terrain, Environmental Controls, Distribution, Limits, and Proper Names. Australian National University Press. ISBN 978-0-708-10741-6.
