= Injilarija =

Aboriginal Australian people

The Injilarija people were an Aboriginal Australian people who lived south of the Gulf of Carpentaria in Queensland, east of the Waanyi, south of the Nguburinji and west of the Mingginda peoples. They are considered extinct.

== History ==
The Gulf Country's Aboriginal peoples were severely affected by the rapid seizure and occupation of their lands by the great pastoral boom of the 1880s. One station at Lawn Hill in Injilarija territory was run by the Melbourne Grammar-educated Jack Watson, whose home had a trophy room with 40 pairs of Aboriginal people's ears nailed to the walls, which he would show proudly to visitors.

The traditional lands of the Injilarija are today partially covered by the Boodjamulla National Park (which includes the Lawn Hill region) in the Shire of Burke. They were taken over by right of succession by the Waanyi people, after the Injilariya were deemed to be extinct, around 1880.

== Notes and references ==
=== References ===
- Evans, Raymond (2007). A History of Queensland. Cambridge University Press. ISBN 978-0-521-87692-6.
- Headon, David (1988). "'The Coming of the Dingos' - Black/White Interaction in the Literature of the Northern Territory". In Nelson, Emmanuel Sampath (ed.). Connections: Essays on Black Literatures. Aboriginal Studies Press. pp. 25–39. ISBN 9780855751869.
- Roberts, Tony (2005). Frontier Justice: A History of the Gulf Country to 1900. University of Queensland Press. ISBN 978-0-702-24083-6.
- Roberts, Tony (November 2009). The Brutal Truth: What Happened in the Gulf Country. The Monthly.
- Sutton, Peter (2004). Native Title in Australia: An Ethnographic Perspective. Cambridge University Press. ISBN 978-1-139-44949-6.
- Trigger, David (2015). "Change and Succession in Aboriginal Claims to Land". In Toner, P.G. (ed.). Strings of Connectedness: Essays in honour of Ian Keen. Australian National University Press. pp. 53–73. ISBN 978-1-925-02263-6.
