= Yukulta language =

Extinct Australian Aboriginal language

Yukulta
- Ganggalida
- Region: Queensland
- Ethnicity: Yukulta, Nguburinji
- Native speakers: 1 full speaker (2007); 51-250 (2018-19)
- Language family: Macro-Pama–Nyungan?: Tangkic; Yukulta
- Dialects: Yukulta; Nguburindi†

Language codes
- ISO 639-3: Either: gcd – Ganggalida nny – Nyangga/Yangkaal (two different languages covered by [nny])
- Glottolog: gang1267 Ganggalida
- AIATSIS: G34 Ganggalida, G19 Nguburinji
- ELP: Ganggalida
- Ganggalidda is classified as Critically Endangered by the UNESCO Atlas of the World's Languages in Danger.

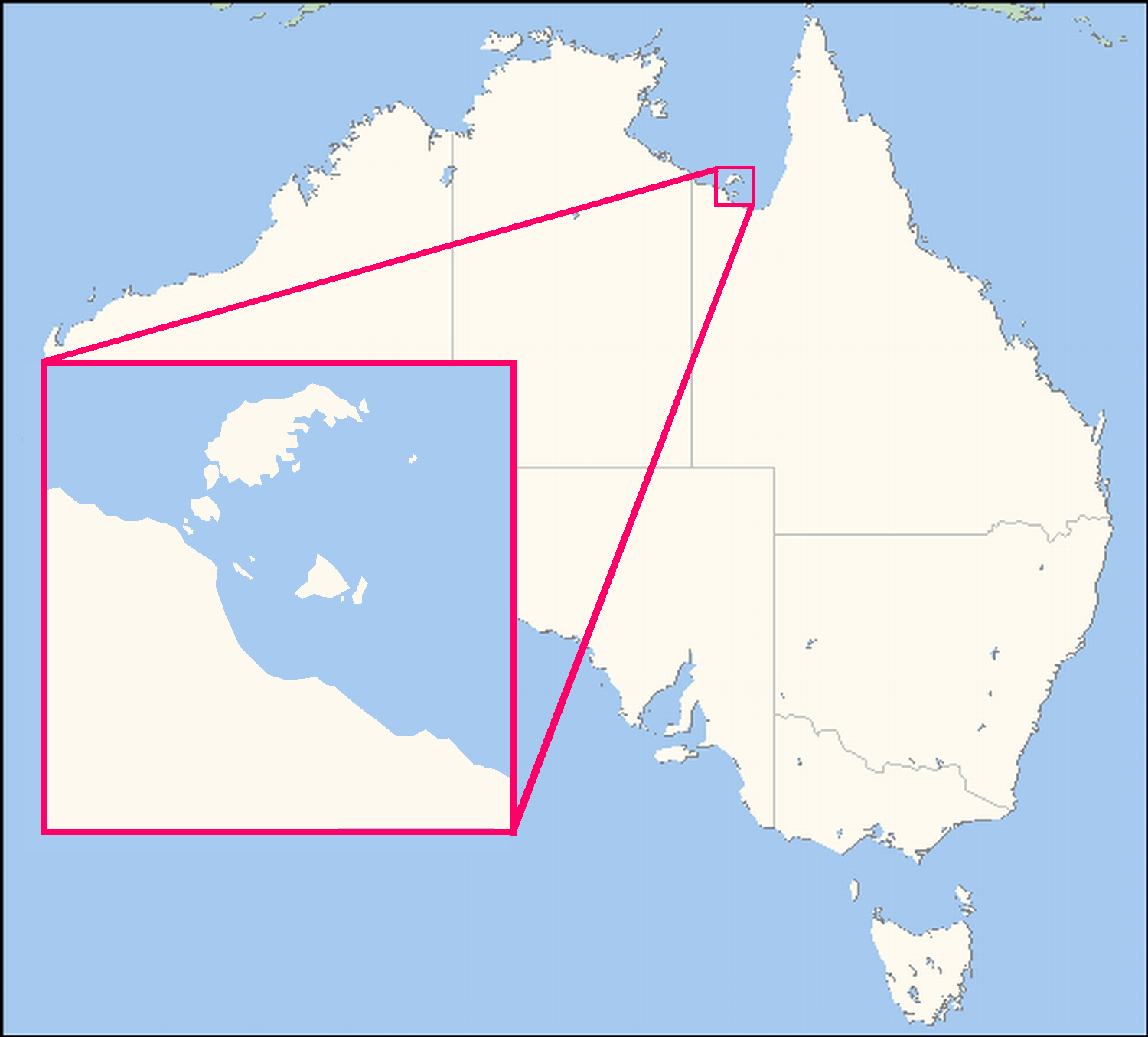
- Traditional lands of the Yukulta people

The Yukulta language, also spelt Yugulda, Yokula, Yukala, Jugula, and Jakula, and also known as Ganggalidda (Kangkalita, Ganggalida), is a Tangkic language spoken in Queensland and Northern Territory, Australia. It was spoken by the Yukulta people, whose traditional lands lie on the southern coast of the Gulf of Carpentaria.

Nguburinji (Ngubirindi) is regarded as a dialect of the same language, spoken by the Nguburinji people. It is now extinct.

== Classification ==
Yukulta is a member of the Tangkic language group, along with Kayardild, Lardil and Yangkaal, all from the North Wellesley Islands and adjoining mainland. The languages are mutually intelligible, and tangka means "person" in all four languages). These languages were classified as Tangkic by Geoffrey O'Grady, with Carl and Flo Voegelin(1966).

Nicholas Evans and Gavan Breen see Yukulta and Nguburinji as dialects of the same language. Nguburinji is known only through a word list by Walter Roth (1897), which shares 90 per cent of its vocabulary with present-day Yukulta.

== Phonology ==
=== Consonants ===
	Peripheral		Laminal		Apical	
	Bilabial	Velar	Palatal	Dental	Alveolar	Retroflex
Plosive	p	k	c	t̪	t	ʈ
Nasal	m	ŋ	ɲ	n̪	n	ɳ
Rhotic					r	ɽ
Lateral					l	ɭ
Approximant		ɰ	j			

It is not clear if the two rhotics are trill and flap, or flap and approximant.

=== Vowels ===
	Front	Central	Back
High	i iː		u uː
Low		a aː	

Yukulta has three vowels, each with a long and short variant: a, i, and u.

== Morphology ==
There are many different rules governing what happens to each Yukulta phoneme in any given environment, so most morphemes have at least two allomorphs.

=== Nominals ===
==== Inflection ====
All Yukulta nouns and adjectives consist of a root and an inflectional ending. Nouns and the adjectives that go along with them have to agree in their endings. Yukulta nominals can take five case-endings: absolutive, ergative/locative, dative, ablative and allative. As in Kayardild, each morphological ending can be realized as various allomorphs, depending on the phonological environment. There can be many versions of any given morpheme. The absolutive marker, for instance, can be realized as any of eight allomorphs.

- The canonical absolutive marker is -ta. The subject of an intransitive verb or the direct object of a transitive verb takes this ending.
- The canonical ergative/locative marker is -iya. The subject of a transitive verb or the place where something takes place takes this ending.
- The canonical dative marker is -iɲca. Indirect objects and the objects of semi-transitive verbs take this ending.
- The canonical ablative marker is -inapa. An item away from which motion is happening takes this ending.
- The canonical allative marker is -iɭu. An item toward or to which motion is happening takes this ending.

==== Derivational endings ====
In addition to the inflectional endings that Yukulta nominals can take, there are a few important derivational affixes that occur between the root and the inflectional ending. Like the inflectional endings, each has a few different allomorphs.

- -wan and -wakaran, the genitive markers, denote possession.
- -wuɭu, the comitative marker, denotes association.
- -wari, the privative marker, denotes the absence of association or possession.

=== Pronouns ===
==== Free pronouns ====
A Yukulta free pronoun consists of a root, case suffix, and possibly an inclusivity marker and/or a marker to distinguish between dual and plural (singular and exclusive are unmarked characteristics). Free pronouns have a different case-system than nominals, with intransitive and transitive subjects and transitive objects taking the nominative ending, semi-transitive objects taking the objective ending, as well as benefactive, locative, allative and ablative endings.

==== Bound pronouns ====
Yukulta also has another sort of pronoun—bound pronouns—which occur as part of the clitic complex. Unlike free pronouns, bound pronouns do not consist of a stem and inflectional endings—each case form is separate. The form depends on a number of considerations, including the number of the subject of a verb, and the number, person, and exclusivity of the subject.

=== Clitic complex ===
The clitic complex attaches to the first constituent of every Yukulta sentence that does not "emphasize a permanent, timeless state of affairs." It consists of bound pronouns corresponding to each party involved in the action, a transitivity marker, and a tense-aspect marker.

=== Verbs ===
All Yukulta verbs are either transitive or intransitive, with each group having a different conjugation pattern. The intransitive groups can be split into purely intransitive verbs and semi-transitive verbs, which take a dative object and an absolutive subject. There are three moods: indicative, imperative and desiderative. There is a further distinction within the imperative mood between imperative and hortatory, and within the desiderative mood between intent and desire.

== Syntax ==
=== Word order ===
Yukulta word order is very free, in large part due to its relatively high level of inflection.

=== Subordinate clauses ===
Some types of subordinate clauses in Yukulta, such as conditional clauses ("if...") and reason clauses ("because...") are simply marked by a clitic attaching to the first constituent. For clauses of time and relative clauses, Yukulta uses the clitic -ŋala along with the rest of the clitic complex.
