= Mingin people =

Aboriginal Australian people of northern Queensland

The Mingin, also known as the Mingginda, are an Aboriginal Australian people of the state of Queensland, who lived in the Gulf Country east of Moonlight Creek and the Yukulta / Ganggalidda people in the southern Gulf of Carpentaria.

== Language ==
The Mingin language's affiliation has yet to be determined but is thought to have belonged to the Tangkic language family, and to have been closely related to the languages of the Wellesley Islands and in particular Yukulta spoken by the neighbouring Ganggalida.

== Country ==
Norman Tindale estimated Mingin land as encompassing around 2,500 square miles (6,500 km^{2}), in the savannah plains south of Burketown on the Barkly River, as far east to the banks of the Leichhardt River. Their southern limits lay around Augustus Downs and Gregory Downs. Their sole contact with the coast was at the area where the Albert River drains into the Gulf of Carpentaria.

== Social customs ==
The Mingin were a circumcising tribe which dropped the rite from their initiation ceremonies sometime around the middle of the 19th century. They had close links, though speaking apparently quite distinct languages, with the neighbouring Maikudunu. According to one early settler in their area, their tribal traditions held that they were respectively formed by branching off from the Kalkatungu, a people whom they, and the Maikudunu, thereafter reportedly held in contempt.

== History ==
The Mingin lived along the coastal territory lying west of the Leichhardt River. One oral account, conserved by the Ganggalida, has them encountering intruders in the area of the Albert River. The Leichhardt river forms a natural divide between differing Aboriginal cultures, circumcision not being practised east of it, from which one may infer that the Mingginda included it in their initiatory rituals.

Within a very short period after the beginning of white settlement in the area, the Mingin were decimated, either through white colonial violence, introduced diseases, or both. The yellow fever that ravaged the settlement of Burketown, which was founded in the heartland of their territory, is thought to have been a major factor precipitating their disappearance, and by the 1930s they were thought of as extinct. The Ganggalida people spread to occupy the niche once occupied by the Mingin, and have successfully petitioned for a native title right to the latter tribe's traditional lands around Burketown on the basis of the principle of succession.

== Alternative names ==
- Mingir (misprint)
- Minikin
- Minkin
- Myngeen

Source: Tindale 1974, p. 181

== Sources ==
- Curr, Edward Micklethwaite (1886). "On the west bank of the Leichardt River, near the sea. Mingin tribe" (PDF). In Curr, Edward Micklethwaite (ed.). The Australian race: its origin, languages, customs, place of landing in Australia and the routes by which it spread itself over the continent. Vol. 2. Melbourne: J. Ferres. pp. 314–315 – via Internet Archive.
- Kerwin, Dale (2011). Aboriginal Dreaming Paths and Trading Routes: The Colonisation of the Australian Economic Landscape. Sussex Academic Press. ISBN 978-1-845-19529-8.
- Palmer, Edward (1884). "Notes on Some Australian Tribes". Journal of the Anthropological Institute of Great Britain and Ireland. 13: 276–347. doi:10.2307/2841896. JSTOR 2841896.
- Tindale, Norman Barnett (1974). "Mingin (QLD)". Aboriginal Tribes of Australia: Their Terrain, Environmental Controls, Distribution, Limits, and Proper Names. Australian National University. ISBN 978-0-708-10741-6.
- Trigger, David (2015). "Change and Succession in Aboriginal Claims to Land". In Toner, P.G. (ed.). Strings of Connectedness: Essays in honour of Ian Keen. Australian National University Press. pp. 53–73. ISBN 978-1-925-02263-6.
- Turnbull, W. (10 August 1896). "On sea coast and the estuary of Leichhardt". Australasian Anthropological Journal. 1 (1): 13.
- Turnbull, W. (21 February 1903). "Correspondence. Armrynald, Burketown". Science of Man. 6 (1): 9–11.
- Turnbull, W. (1 August 1911). "Investigations in Minikin and Mikadoon tribes". Science of Man. 13 (4): 79–80.
