= Minkin language =

Extinct Australian Aboriginal language

Minkin
- Mingginda
- Native to: Australia
- Region: Burketown, Queensland
- Ethnicity: Mingin people
- Extinct: late 19th century
- Language family: Macro-Pama–Nyungan?: Tangkic; Minkin

Language codes
- ISO 639-3: xxm
- Glottolog: mink1237
- AIATSIS: G26

Minkin or Mingginda is an extinct Australian Aboriginal language, perhaps a language isolate, of northern Australia. It was spoken by the Mingin people in the area around Burketown, on the southern coast of the Gulf of Carpentaria, in an area that contains the headwaters of the Leichhardt River.

The classification of Minkin is uncertain, primarily due to a lack of data. It has been suggested that it may have been related to the Yiwaidjan or Tankic language families. Evans (1990) believes it has been demonstrated to be a Tankic language, more distant than the others are to each other; this is accepted in Bowern (2011).

== Phonology ==
=== Consonants ===
	Peripheral		Laminal		Apical	
	Labial	Velar	Dental	Palatal	Alveolar	Retroflex
Plosive	p	k	t̪	tʲ	t	ʈ
Nasal	m	ŋ	(n̪)	nʲ	n	ɳ
Rhotic					(ɾ~r)	(ɻ)
Lateral			(l̪)	lʲ	l	ɭ
Approximant	w			j		

Consonants in parentheses are unattested, but may have existed based on other languages' phonologies.

=== Vowels ===
	Front	Central	Back
High	i		u
Low		a	

It is not possible to tell if there was vowel length.

The following wildcard letters represent unresolvable segments:

- T = /t̪/, /ʈ/ or /t/
- TH = /t̪/ or /tʲ/
- N = /n/, /ɳ/, /n̪/, /ŋ/, also /nʲ/ initially
- NH = /n/, /n/, /nʲ/
- NG = /ŋ/ /ŋk/, or /nk/
- W = /ŋ/, or /w/ initially
- W = /ŋ/ or /k/ initially
- G = /k/ or /tʲ/
- L = /l/, /ɭ/ or /l̪/
- R = /r/ or /ɻ/
- E = /i/ or /a/
- O = /u/ or /a/
- V = any vowel

== Vocabulary ==
Minkin data reconstituted by Evans (1990):

gloss	Minkin
man (Aboriginal)	ŋaRka (ŋařka)
'the blacks'	yaŋ(k)ana; wampuRa; kOmu; miŋ(k)u
white man	piʈa; Takantana
young man	kulankali; wuRunta (wuɽunta)
boy, children	wuRaRa
baby (also 'little', 'younger brother')	piltʸinkuRa
girl	puLupuLa (puɭupuɭa)
woman	maku
old man	paʈiŋaRa
old woman	waʈikiRi (waʈikiři)
father	kEyatʸi
mother	kuntuŋu
sister	wuŋ(k)uRa-paŋa; yilulaŋa
brother, elder	Naŋkalʸ or Naŋkay
brother, younger	piRtʸinkuRa
mother's mother	TiTila
God	tʸORpuyu
ghosts	paʈa
'being who taught them everything'	kuwaRi
head	wiʈa
hair of head	puLumpa
hair of beard, beard	yaRinʸa, yaRiŋa
eye	mitʸELa
ear	maRa (mařa)
mouth	paRka
teeth	liya
tongue	THalŋa ~ THanŋa
nose	kiwiRa
face	yiRa
neck	panTaLmaRa
shoulder	tʸaʈa
breasts, milk	ŋukula
back	kOnTa (kanta)
stomach	paʈaka; puLtʸi
chest	payuLa
thigh	piLpa; t̪anpa
leg	tʸila
ankle	mukuLa
foot	tʸaŋ(k)a
track of a foot	tʸaŋ(k)ay, tʸaNa
arm	waLERa
wrist	muni-muni; maNay-maNay
hand	ŋaRŋaRa (ŋařŋařa)
fingers	ŋařa
skin	pakuRu
bone	TimERa (ʈimiřa)
blood	takana
fat	paRaŋ(k)a (paɽaŋka)
bowels, excrement	TORa (ʈuRa)
excrement	malina
kangaroo	punkana; tʸaku-tʸaku
possum	wapuRa
tame dog	kutu
wild dog, dingo	mitʸilpaRa
emu	puLanʸtʸana
black duck	piyanʸtʸuRa
wood duck	yapiRa- muntunʸtʸiRa
pelican	yukuTaRa; pitiltu
laughing jackass (kookaburra)	TalkuRa (t̪alkuřa)
native companion (brolga)	Tila-TalkuRa; puRalku
white cockatoo	TayalpuwaRa; kaRimpala
crow	waŋkuLa
swan	kunankuta
wild turkey	piRinkuRa
egg	yapipa
snake	palaŋ(k)aRa; pakanpapa
fish	waRa
crayfish	miNTuLa
mosquito	kalaRaŋ(k)a (kalařaŋka)
fly	wuŋaRa; kuRiNa
grass	kOɳa (kaɳa); puLpa
bark	kuRumpa; pakuRu
wood	wiLa; wiLaTaLOnti (wiLa t̪alunti)
war-spear	waRinwaRina; maLtʸiNTaRa
reed-spear	waRin; ŋuRmi (ŋuřmi)
woomera	piRi (piři)
shield	Taʈuna; tʸaRpi (tʸařpi)
tomahawk	THaʈiyapina; tʸaRiwiNTila
boomerang	waŋila
carvings on boomerang	waLitʸi
canoe	kamiRa
camp	NETa (ɳat̪a) (ŋita)
fire	wiLa
heat	yaLuLu (yalulu); mawuRina
smoke	Tumpuɳa; kuya-kuya
light	NawaNawa; kawuntuNaRay
dark (= night)	kawuNTi
water, rain	wat̪a
food	La(R)kuLa
honey (= fat)	paRaŋ(k)a (paɽaŋka)
thirsty	NVRmuNTu (ŋawaRmuNTu)
hungry	NaLu
stone, hill	kapaʈa
ground	kuʈa
river	kaTaRa (kat̪ařa)
lake, lagoon	paNka
swamp	wuɭpa
sea	mawORa
sun	tʸiRiŋaŋa
moon	palaŋatʸi
moon; star (?)	piRiŋ(k)a (piɽiŋka)
star; sky (?)	TaLaLa (ʈalala)
thunder	piʈimaRa(-Ta)
wind	waRmaRa (wařmaɽa)
rain	puLuLaŋ(k)ana
day	palmanmaLamaLa; yiɳanʸtʸi
today	yanaNiŋ(k)a, yanaLiŋ(k)a
night	miLimaʈa; kawuNTi
yesterday	kawuNTiwa; yaluNTay
dawn	ŋaNaRaNa, yuNaRaNa
tomorrow	kawuNTu, kawuNTuŋ(k)aRa
by-and-by	kiTaNTa ŋatʸa
cold	KuRiNa (ŋuřina)
good	puRuka
bad	TuRka
big	puLaNa; kuNamiRa (kunʸamiřa)
little; baby	piltʸinkuRa
dead, rotten	pukayaNa, puka
sweet	kaRaLkaRaLa
one	tʸuwaRnʸu ~ tʸuwaLnʸu
two	Tikinʸa
three	Tantʸilta
four	Tikintalʸu- TuwaLʸu, TikintʸaLinʸa
plenty, many	yunkuna; wan(a)puRa
none, no	wiɳiŋa; Wawiŋa
any	waNTini
some	tʸiliŋa
same	man̪t̪anʸi
other	tʸawuNiliŋa
to walk	yaNkiya
to walk, go	yapu
to run	Taŋanʸi
to go away	tʸawuyu
to come here	ŋatʸa
to sit	Ninʸa; kuNuyu
to take	kawapa
to hold	niŋapa
to let him go	yiɭayaNkipa
to give	wuNapa
to burn with fire	Nalapa
to make	piʈimapa
to sleep	yuŋ(k)uyu
to die	yuRpiyu
to live	piRitʸinʸa
to eat	TayaTaya, TaRa
to drink	WawunTini
to speak	watʸi
to see	Nawapa
to feel	(yu)wiŋapa
to hear	(yu)wiŋʸtʸin- ta(R)watʸiNa
to know	mitʸil-maRa
yes	Niya (ŋiya)
'Name of a place where the being camped'	maalpay or maalpi
Marriage class A (male)	LiyaRaNu
Marriage class C (female, marries A)	kaŋila
Marriage class B (male, marries D)	kayaLOLa
Marriage class D (female, marries B)	ŋařitʸpalaŋi
Where are the blacks?	TaɳaŋaRa komu?; TaɳaŋaRa miŋ(k)u
I don't know.	waNTaŋ Naŋ(k)i kuʈa; waNTaŋ Nanʸtʸi kuʈa

=== Animals ===
- jaco-jaco (kangaroo)
- kallanarra (mosquito)
- karimbala (white cockatoo)
- koodoo (tame dog)
- koorina (fly)
- megilpurra (wild dog)
- ooabiba (egg)
- paganbaba (snake)
- piringooraa (wild turkey)
- piteldoo (pelican)
- poolunganna (emu)
- pooralga (native companion)
- wapoora (possum)
- wongoola (crow)
- worra (fish)

=== Body parts ===
- bilba (thigh)
- boormba (hair of the head)
- changa (foot)
- charn-nga (tongue)
- dimira (bone)
- kiwira (nose)
- lia (teeth)
- makola (breasts)
- mara (ear)
- migilla (eye)
- na-nga-ra (hand)
- pagooroo (skin)
- paranga (fat)
- pardaga (stomach)
- parka (mouth)
- tangana (blood)
- turra (bowel and excrement)
- wedda (head)
- yarin-nga (beard)

=== Numbers ===
- choarng-ngo (one)
- tigina (two)
- tarngiltna (three)

=== People ===
- birgenkoora (brother-younger)
- churbooyo (God)
- kiagi (father)
- koo-ar-ee (being who taught them everything)
- koondoonoo (mother)
- magoo (black woman)
- nacile (brother-elder)
- nurka (aboriginal man)
- ooardigiri (old woman)
- ooroonda (a young man)
- parda (ghosts)
- pardingara (an old man)
- pelgincorra (a baby)
- takandana (a white man)
- tano ara mingoo? (where are black?)
- tyana (track of a foot)
- wompoora (the blacks)
- yillolunga (sister-elder)

Source: Curr 1886, p. 314
