= Boodjamulla National Park =

National park in Queensland, Australia

- IUCN category II (national park)
- Boodjamulla National Park

- Location within Queensland
- Location: Queensland
- Nearest city: Burketown
- Area: 2,820 km^{2} (1,090 sq mi)
- Established: 1985
- Governing body: Queensland Parks and Wildlife Service
- Website: https://parks.des.qld.gov.au/parks/boodjamulla

Boodjamulla National Park, formerly known as Lawn Hill National Park, is a national park in the Shire of Burke, Queensland, Australia. The Riversleigh World Heritage Area is a World Heritage Site within the park.

The park lies on the traditional land of the Waanyi (part of which was previously part of Injilarija land). In the 1870s European settlers moved into the area and started running cattle, with a number of smaller properties amalgamated to create Lawn Hill Station, one of Queensland's largest cattle stations. An area of station land was given by the owner to the government as Crown land in 1984 (with a further grant in 1992), to be used for public benefit. The Waanyi people were granted native title in 2010.

The land lies across sandstone ranges, with creeks and rivers crossing it. The outstanding attraction is Lawn Hill Gorge. The park is home to a wide range of native wildlife, and is classified as an Important Bird Area.

Following extensive flooding in March 2023, the park has been closed to visitors, but is reopening in stages from July 2025.

== History ==
The Waanyi have lived in the gorge area for at least 17,000 years and know this place as Boodjamulla, or Rainbow Serpent country. Lawn Hill Gorge is sacred to the Waanyi people. Midden heaps, camp sites, grinding stones, and rock art evidence the importance of this place. Today, the Waanyi people help manage the park. Part of the land around Lawn Hill was occupied by the Injilarija people, until they became extinct around 1880 and the Waanyi took over their land.

The park has a rich pastoral history and until December 1984 was part of Lawn Hill Station, which was once one of Queensland's largest cattle properties. The cattle station was formed from several leases originally granted in the 1870s, and for some time was run by the notoriously cruel Jack Watson and Frank Hann, who regularly hunted down and shot Aboriginal people living in the area, cutting the ears of their corpses and nailing them to the walls of the homestead. The Aboriginal outlaw Joe Flick shot dead a Native Police officer and wounded Frank Hann during a shootout at Lawn Hill in 1889.

Sebastião Ferreira Maia, who owned that station from 1976, returned 122 square kilometres (47 sq mi) on the lease to the state in 1984, on the condition it be managed for the public's benefit. In 1992, another 1,350 square kilometres (520 sq mi) was given to the crown to extend the park's boundaries.

The Riversleigh and Musselbrook sections were amalgamated into the park in 1992.

The national park was gazetted on 8 August 1994 under the Nature Conservation Act 1992 by regulation, Nature Conservation (Declaration of Nature Refuges) Amendment (No.1) 1994; then amended by regulation, Nature Conservation (Protected Areas) Amendment (No.5) 1999.and again by Forestry (State Forests) and Nature Conservation (Protected Areas) Amendment (No.1) 2003.

A native title claim was lodged by the Waanyi people in 1994, which was finally granted in 2010 that they received native title rights over the region.

The park was formerly known as Lawn Hill National Park. On 7 June 2022 the new Boodjamulla National Park Management Plan was published, officially introducing joint management of the park between the Queensland Parks and Wildlife Service and the Waanyi people.

Following extensive flooding in March 2023, the park has been closed to visitors, reopening in stages from July 2025.

== Geography ==
The park is in the Gulf Country region of northwestern Queensland. The park is 340 km (210 mi) northwest of Mount Isa or 1,837 km (1,141 mi) northwest of Brisbane, in the Shire of Burke in Queensland.

The main attractions in the park are the sandstone ranges with deep gorges and a limestone plateau with significant fossil fields. Other attractions include crystal-clear green waters, lush vegetation and canoeing. Surrounding the park are numerous resources reserves, set aside for mineral exploration and mining.

== Description ==
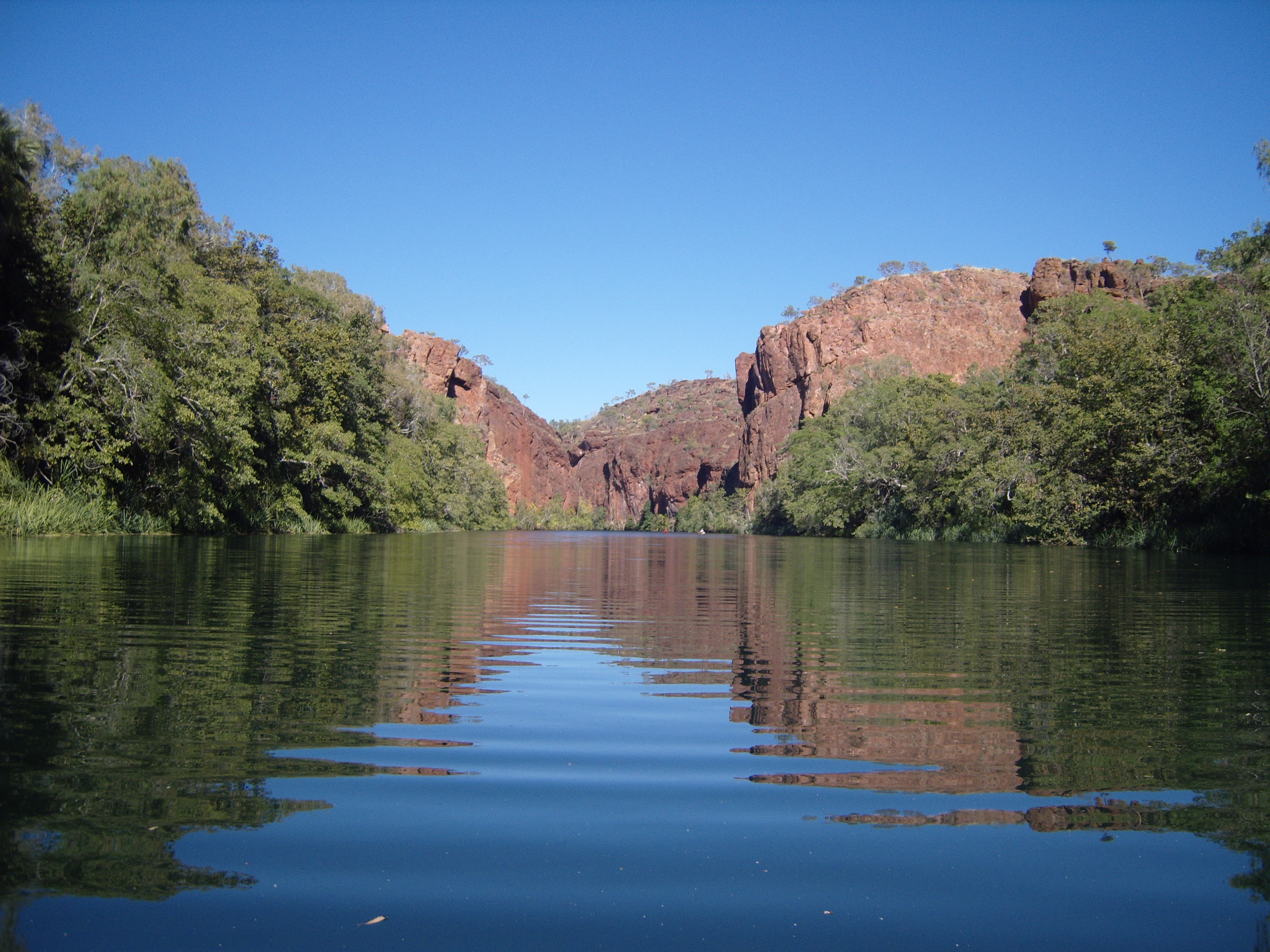
Lawn Hill Gorge

The Riversleigh Fossil Fields Section of the park is a World Heritage Site and contains many fossil remains. Animal bones dating back 25 million years are preserved in the sediments.

The park contains several permanent creeks, waterholes, gorges, and sandstone ranges. Boodjamulla's ancient sandstones and limestones have been gradually stripped away over millions of years leaving behind rugged escarpments, gorges, and rock outcrops. There are four main habitats contained with the park: riverine, alluvial flats, rocky hills, and clay plains.

Lawn Hill Gorge, the primary attraction in the park, cuts through the sandstone plateau of the Constance Range, on the eastern extremity of the Barkly Tableland. The gorge has been carved out by Lawn Hill Creek, which flows all year and is fed by numerous freshwater springs from the limestone plateau to the west. The gorge is a rich oasis with cabbage palms and other tropical vegetation.

Also located in the park are the Gregory River and O'Shanassy Rivers which flow all year round. The park contains 20 km (12 mi) of walking tracks.

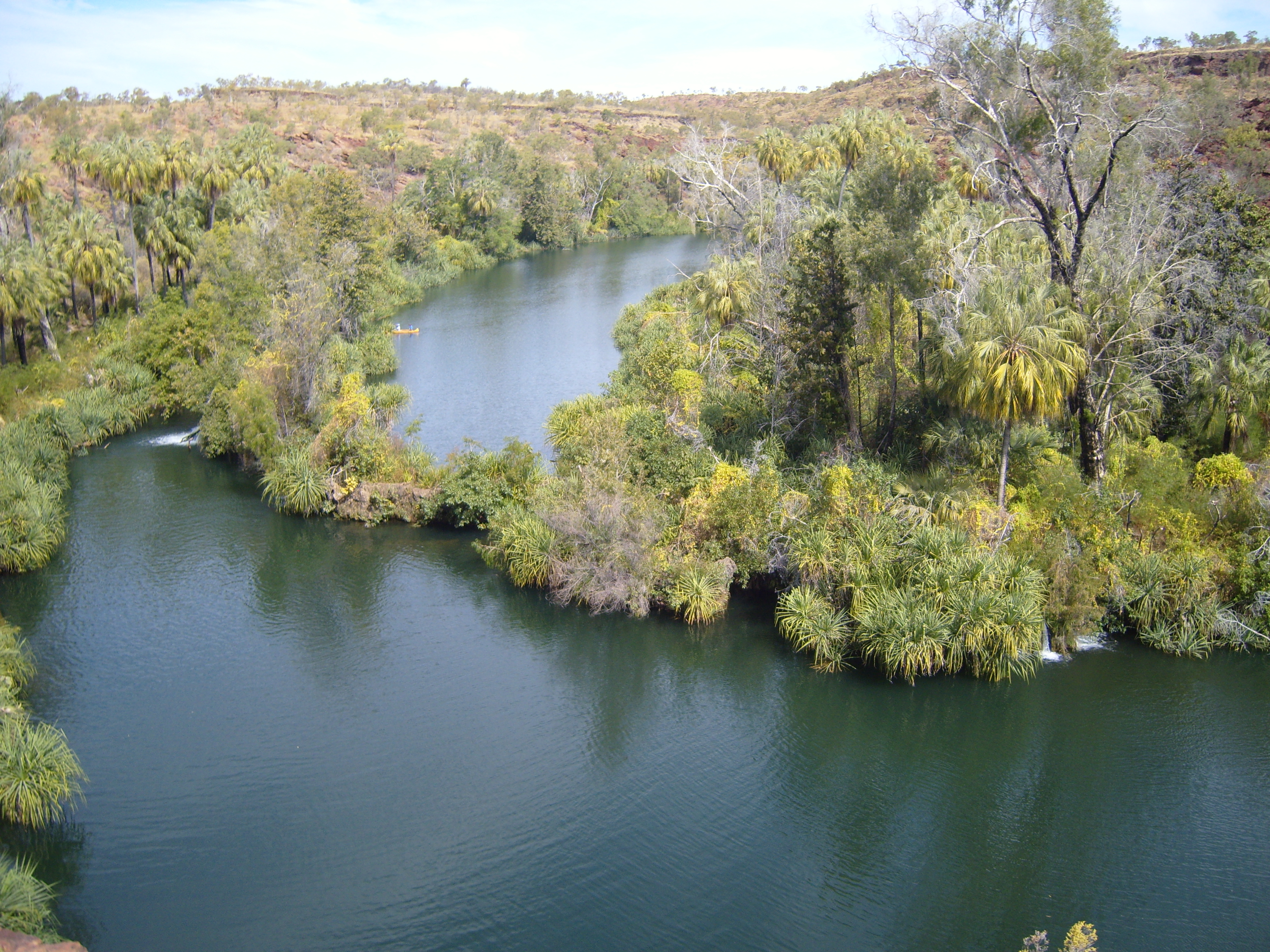
Indarri Falls

== Environment ==
=== Flora ===
On the sandstone hills are spinifex, acacias, eucalypts and grevilleas. Growing on the river plains are western bloodwoods and mitchell grass. Paperbarks, river red gums, figs, ferns, pandanus and cabbage palms are found along the creek and river banks. A diverse range of aquatic plants such as waterlilies, ferns, mosses, sedges and bulrushes grow in the creeks.

=== Fauna ===
Freshwater crocodiles can be found in the gorge; however, they pose little threat because they prefer to stay away from humans. They may become aggressive if disturbed when mating or protecting their young.

The park is home to the most easterly distribution of the nocturnal rock ringtail possum. Other animal species found in the park include the rock-haunting ringtail possum, agile wallaby, olive python, catfish, wallaroo, dingo, and echidna. In the creeks are archerfish, the endangered red-bellied short-necked turtles, northern snapping turtles as well as numerous fish species.

Fishing in the national park is not permitted with the exception of Gregory River in the Riversleigh section. Lawn Hill and the surrounding regions are also inhabited by feral pigs which cause extensive damage to the land close by the creek systems.

==== Birds ====
The park is classified by BirdLife International as an Important Bird Area. It is home to more than 140 bird species, including the buff-sided robin, great bowerbird, red-collared lorikeet, crimson finch, zebra finch, kestrel, spinifex pigeon, barking owl, brolga, budgerigars, and the wedge-tailed eagle. It supports a large population of the Carpentarian grasswren and small numbers of the painted honeyeater. The rare purple-crowned fairy-wren is the park emblem.

== Management ==
Since 7 June 2022, the park has been jointly managed by the Queensland Parks and Wildlife Service and the Waanyi people. At this time, there were five or six Indigenous rangers, with the number expected to increase.

== Access ==
The park is 100 km west of Gregory. From Mount Isa visitors travel along the Barkly Highway north. The easiest way to get to the park is via the Burke & Wills Roadhouse. The road is unsealed and may be impassable after rain. The wet season is from October to March. Because the park is so remote it is advised that visitors bring excess fuel, food and water.

=== Camping ===
Camping is allowed in two areas; Lawn Hill Gorge and Miyumba bush camp near the Gregory River. The Lawn Hill Gorge site provides toilets and showers. This site allows only one vehicle per camp site and is not suitable for caravans or vehicles larger than 4 m in length. Permits are required and bookings are essential from Easter to October.

== See also ==
- Protected areas of Queensland
