= Proto-Pama–Nyungan language =

Reconstructed ancestor of the Pama–Nyungan languages

Proto-Pama–Nyungan
- pPNy
- Reconstruction of: Pama–Nyungan languages
- Region: Gulf Plains, NE Australia
- Era: perhaps ca. 3000 BCE
- Lower-order reconstructions: Proto-Arandic; Proto-Thura-Yura

Proto-Pama–Nyungan is a hypothetical ancestral language from which all Pama–Nyungan languages are supposed to have derived. It may have been spoken as recently as about 5,000 years ago, much more recently than Aboriginal Australian peoples are believed to have been inhabiting various parts of Australia.

== Evolution ==
How the Pama–Nyungan languages spread over most of the continent and displaced any pre-Pama–Nyungan languages is not currently deciphered; one possibility is that language could have been transferred from one group to another alongside culture and ritual. Given the relationship of cognates between groups, it seems that Pama-Nyungan has many of the characteristics of a sprachbund, indicating the antiquity of multiple waves of culture contact between groups. Dixon in particular has argued that the genealogical trees found with many language families do not fit in the Pama-Nyungan family.

Using computational phylogenetics, Bouckaert, et al. (2018) posit a mid-Holocene expansion of Pama-Nyungan from the Gulf Plains of northeastern Australia.

== Phonology ==
Proto-Pama–Nyungan's phonological inventory, as reconstructed by Barry Alpher (2004), is quite similar to those of most present-day Australian languages.

=== Vowels ===
	Front	Back
High	i iː	u uː
Low	a aː	

Vowel length is contrastive only in the first (i.e. stressed) syllable in a word.

=== Consonants ===
	Peripheral		Laminal	Apical	
	Bilabial	Velar	Postalveolar	Alveolar	Retroflex
Plosive	p	k	c cʲ	t	ʈ
Nasal	m	ŋ	ɲ	n	ɳ
Lateral			ʎ	l	ɭ
Rhotic				r	ɽ
Semivowel	w		j		

Proto-Pama–Nyungan seems to have had only one set of laminal consonants; the two contrasting sets (lamino-dental and lamino-alveopalatal or "palatal") found in some present-day languages can largely be explained as innovations resulting from conditioned sound changes.

Nevertheless, there are a small number of words in which an alveolo-palatal stop is found where a dental would be expected, and these are written *cʲ. No convincing evidence bas been found, however, of an equivalent nasal *ɲʲ or lateral *ʎʲ.

== Pronouns ==
Reconstructed Proto-Pama–Nyungan pronouns from Alpher (2004):

gloss	Proto-Pama-Nyungan
1 Sg Dir. Object	*ngañi, *ngaña
1 Sg Oblique	*ngacu(+)
1 Sg Oblique	*ngaca+
2 Sg	*ñuntu
you SG OBL	*ñuna
we EXnonSg	*ngana
we INDU	*ngali
you PL	*ñurra
they DU	*pula
they PL	*cana

== Vocabulary ==
Reconstructed Proto-Pama–Nyungan vocabulary and morphemes from Alpher (2004):

gloss	Proto-Pama-Nyungan
(ablative, elative) suffix or postposition	*nguru
acacia (sp.)	*wirlu
alive	*kunka
all	*muku
anger	*kuli
ankle	*nuka
another	*wiːya
auntie	*mayi
away	*yarra ~ *yirra
back	*mutu/a
beard	*ngarnka
behind	*kurri
belly (inside)	*walngka
big	*purlka
bird sp: frogmouth	*tawa ~ *tawu
bite	*paca- ~ *paca-
black	*ngulcu
bone	*muku
bottom	*mangka
bream (sp.)	*lipa-
breast	*ngamun
by and by	*ngula
cavity	*lumpu
cheek	*walu
child (to woman), sister's child	*cuwa ~ *cuway
clean	*taːrrkal
cold	*mica
cook in earth oven	*kaːmpa-
cooked food	*mucya
cousin	*maːri
cry	*rungka-
damage	*ruwa-/i-
dig	*paːnga-
dig	*paka-
digging stick	*kana
drink	*kuñcya-
drink	*luka-
dry	*lalka
eat	*mungka-
excrement	*kuna
eye	*kuru
fall	*kaːlka/i-
fall	*wanti- ~ *wanta-
fast	*kalmpa
father's sister	*piːmu
fish	*kuya/u
flame	*yalyu
foot	*cama
foot	*cina
forehead	*ngulu
ghost	*wangarr
green pygmy goose	*tiwa+
ground	*taːku
hand	*mara
having	*+mirri
heart	*lulku
here	*ñaka
hip	*pirlu
hit	*paca- (?)
hold together	*karrpi- ~ *karrpa-
I	*ngayu ~ *ngayi ~ *ngaya
later	*ngaka
laugh	*cangkar(V)
lay (egg), give birth to (young)	*ngaːci- ~ *ngaːca-
left hand	*caku
lick	*pila-
lick	*pina
louse	*kulu/i
moon	*kakara
moon (full)	*pira
mother	*ngama
mother's brother	*ngami(r)ni
mother's father	*ngaci
mother's mother	*kami
mother's older brother	*mukur
mouth	*caː
mouth	*caːwa/u
mud	*curlpi
nasal mucus	*ngu(ː)rrci
neck	*manu
nose	*kuːwu
nose	*ngurru
not	*kari
one	*kuma
pearlshell	*piːrra
pierce	*ka(r)li-
pigeon (sp.)	*laparr
pull	*purra-/i-
pus, matter	*ci(ː)ci
put	*wanta- ~ *wanti-
put	*wunpa/i-
rat	*kalu
rotten	*puka
saltpan	*pacirri
sand	*curtu
sandfly	*lañirri
scratch, scrape	*wiːrrngka-
seagull	*cyarra
see	*ña(ː)-
shade	*malu
shell, bivalve (sp.)	*wirti
shin	*yangkara
sickness	*wanci
singe it	*wita-
sister (older)	*yapa
sit	*ñiːna-
smell	*ñuːma-
some	*wapu
sore	*wiːthi
speak	*wangka- (?)
spear	*kalka
spear	*laːma- ~ *raːma- ~ *taːma-
spear	*ra-
stand it up	*carra-
stick	*ci(ː)rni
sting	*raca-
taboo	*ngalñca
tail	*mulu
take	*maː-
termite mound	*tipa
there	*pala
thigh	*carra
to wet (something)	*kiñca-
together	*turnu
tongue	*calañ
tongue	*ngañcar
tooth	*rirra ~ *lirra
turn	*wirni-
two	*kucyarra ~ *kucarra
urine	*kañcyi
urine	*kumpu
vegetable food	*mayi
water	*nguku ~ *nguki
what	*miña
what	*ngaːni
where	*wañca
who	*waːri ~ *waːra
wife's mother's brother	*caːmi
wind	*waːrlpa
wing	*marra
woman	*kapi+
woman	*yipi

In addition to Hale's 1982 list of words unique to Pama–Nyungan, and in addition to pronouns and case endings they reconstruct for the proto-language, Evans and McConvell report that while some of their roots are implausible, O'Grady and Tryon, nevertheless provide "hundreds of clear cognate sets with attestations throughout the Pama–Nyungan area and absent outside."
