= Cliffdale Creek =

Cliffdale
- Location of Cliffdale Creek mouth in Queensland

Location
- Country: Australia
- Territory: Queensland
- Region: Gulf Country

Physical characteristics
- Source
  - location: China Wall, Gulf Country, Australia
  - elevation: 166 m (545 ft)
- Mouth: Elizabeth Creek
  - location: Gulf Country, Australia
  - coordinates: 16°56′55″S 138°46′31″E
  - elevation: 0 m (0 ft)
- Length: 197 km (122 mi)
- Basin size: 6,209 km^{2} (2,397 sq mi)

Cliffdale Creek is a creek in Queensland, Australia.

The headwaters of the creek rise at the eastern end of China Wall on the edge of the Barkly Tableland close to the border of the Northern Territory. The creek flows north easterly direction through the mostly uninhabited Gulf Country and eventually discharges into Elizabeth Creek, which in turn lows into the Gulf of Carpentaria near Mornington Island.

The catchment area of the creek occupies an 6,209 square kilometres (2,397 sq mi), of which an area of 388 square kilometres (150 sq mi) is composed of estuarine wetlands.

== See also ==
- List of rivers of Australia § Queensland
