= Tangkic languages =

Language family of northern Australia

Tangkic
- Geographic distribution: southeastern coast of the Gulf of Carpentaria, Wellesley Islands
- Linguistic classification: Macro-Pama–Nyungan?: Greater Pama–Nyungan?; Tangkic
- Subdivisions: Leerdil; Kayardild–Yangkaal; Yukulta; ?Minkin †

Language codes
- Glottolog: tang1340
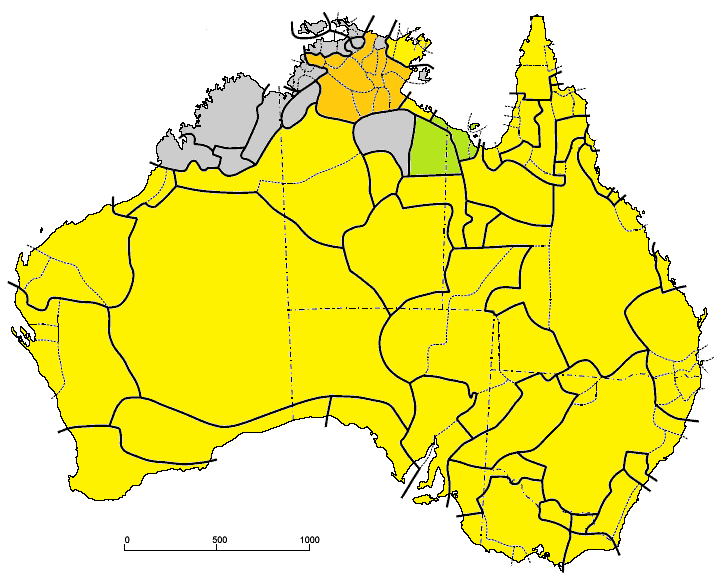
- Garawa and Tangkic (green). Tangkic lies along the coast.

The Tangkic languages form a small language family of Australian Aboriginal languages spoken in northern Australia.

The Tangkic languages are Lardil (Leerdil) and its special register Damin, Kayardild, and Yukulta (also known as Ganggalida or Nyangga). Of these Lardil is quite divergent, while Yukulta and Kayardild are mutually intelligible.

The extinct and poorly attested Minkin language may have been part of the Tangkic family.

== Vocabulary ==
Capell (1942) lists the following basic vocabulary items:

English	Laːdil	Neːmarang
man	jugadbaɖa	bidinaŋga
woman	binŋin	magudaŋga
head	lälga	nälda
eye	gɔa	miːbul
nose	njulda	girga
mouth	Lämin	wara
tongue	djalda Lämin	djärŋana
wallaby	gandjin	magurag
crow	waːga	djaɖag
sun	warga	wargu
moon	giɖigiɽ	waldar
fire	njuda	ŋida
smoke	ḏuŋal	wadu
water	ŋoga	ŋogo
raft	wälba	wälbu
paddle	bilir	bilir
father	ganda	ganda
mother	ŋama	
sky, above	vägiri, walman	warmu
ground	duLga	duLga
wind	wanŋal	warma
snake	jälbur	jälbur
food	vɛnɛ	wulaŋ
ashes	bɔrbo	galar
sea	mäla	mala
whirlwind	warguḏulɛn	danamaŋ
