= Geoffrey O'Grady =

Geoffrey O'Grady (1 January 1928 -29 December 2008) was a professor Emeritus of linguistics whose primary field of specialisation was Australian Aboriginal languages.

== Life and career ==
O'Grady trained as a jackaroo and worked as a stockman at Wallal Downs station pastoral lease some 251 kilometres (156 mi) north-east of Port Hedland from 1949 to 1955.

From 1952, he carried out linguistic studies, focusing particularly on the Nyangumarta language and people. Challenging the received notion that Aboriginal languages were lexically impoverished, O'Grady gathered some 4,000 roots which, together with Helmut Petri and Gisela Odermann's list of 6,550 words compiled at Anna Plains, gave proof of a rich language that could appropriate by assimilation and grammatical modification many concepts that were exclusive to the domain of Western civilisation.

Over two months in March/April 1961, O'Grady and the visiting American linguist Ken Hale made a sweeping survey tour of coastal languages spoken from Port Augusta in South Australia to Broome in Western Australia, and managed to record significant quantities of material from 26 languages.

== Selected publications ==
- O'Grady, Geoffrey N.; Voegelin, Carl F.; Voegelin, Florence M. (1966). "Languages of the world : Indo-Pacific Fascicle Six". Anthropological Linguistics. 8 (2): 1–197.

== Sources ==
- "Geoff O'Grady". Times Colonist. Victoria, British Columbia. 3–4 January 2009.
- Hale, Monty (2012). Scrimgeour, Anne (ed.). Kurlumarniny: We Come from the Desert. Aboriginal Studies Press. ISBN 978-0-855-75830-1.
- Nash, David (November–December 2001). "In memoriam Ken Hale (1934-2001)". Glot International. 5 (9/10): 339–340.
- O'Grady, Geoffrey N. (June 1957). "Statistical Investigations into an Australian Language". Oceanic Linguistics. 27 (4). Oceania: 283–312. doi:10.1002/j.1834-4461.1957.tb00707.x. JSTOR 40329062.
- O'Grady, Geoffrey N. (January 1960). "New Concepts in Nyaŋumaḍa: Some Data on Linguistic Acculturation". Anthropological Linguistics. 2 (1): 1–6. JSTOR 30022232.
- O'Grady, Geoffrey N. (1964). Nyangumarta Grammar (PDF). University of Sydney.
- O'Grady, Geoffrey N. (Winter 1966). "Proto-Ngayarda Phonology". Oceanic Linguistics. 5 (2). University of Hawai'i Press: 71–130. doi:10.2307/3622951. JSTOR 3622951.
