= Bertie Hoare =

British flying ace of WWII

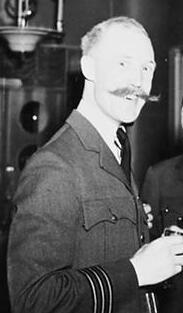
- Born: June 1912; Brighton, England
- Died: 26 March 1947 (aged 34); Sydney Island, Gulf of Carpentaria, Australia
- Military career
- Allegiance: United Kingdom
- Branch: Royal Air Force
- Service years: 1936–1947
- Rank: Wing Commander
- Commands: No. 23 Squadron; No. 605 Squadron; RAF Little Snoring
- Conflicts: Second World War
- Awards: Distinguished Service Order & Bar; Distinguished Flying Cross & Bar

Bertie Hoare, DSO & Bar, DFC & Bar (1912 – 26 March 1947) was a flying ace who served in the Royal Air Force (RAF) during the Second World War. During his service with the RAF, he was credited with having destroyed at least nine German aircraft.

Born in Brighton, Hoare joined the RAF in 1936 and was commissioned as a pilot officer. Posted to No. 207 Squadron upon completion of his training, he was injured in an aircraft accident soon after the commencement of the Second World War. He returned to operational duty in early 1941, with an assignment to No. 23 Squadron as a night fighter pilot. With his navigator/radar operator, Warrant Officer J. F. Potter, he achieved several aerial victories on intruder missions to German-occupied Europe, and commanded the squadron for a time. Further aerial victories were made when he later commanded No. 605 Squadron. He ended the war as commander of the RAF station at Little Snoring. Remaining in the RAF in the immediate postwar period, he served at the headquarters of the RAF's Far East Air Force in Singapore. In 1947 he was attached to the Royal New Zealand Air Force's ferry flight for the purpose of flying a recently acquired De Havilland Mosquito heavy fighter from Singapore to New Zealand. He and his navigator were killed when their Mosquito crashed while traversing the Gulf of Carpentaria in bad weather.

== Early life ==
Bertie Rex O'Bryen Hoare was born in June 1912 in Brighton, England, the son of Bertie and Mary Hoare. Educated at Harrow School, he then went on to attend Wye Agricultural College. He joined the Royal Air Force (RAF) in March 1936, on a short service commission. After initial flying training, he was granted his commission as an acting pilot officer with effect from 18 May.

Proceeding to No. 11 Flying Training School, Hoare soon gained his wings. He was posted to No. 207 Squadron, a light bomber unit, in early 1937, and was confirmed in his rank later in the year. He was promoted to acting flight lieutenant two years later.

== Second World War ==
In October 1939, shortly after the outbreak of the Second World War, Hoare was seriously injured in an aircraft accident and hospitalised for several months. During his convalescence he reverted to his flying officer rank. He returned to operational duty with a posting to No. 23 Squadron in early 1941, by which time his substantive rank was flight lieutenant. He was paired with Warrant Officer J. F. Potter as his navigator/radar operator, and the pair would fly together operationally for the duration of the war. His new unit used Bristol Blenheim night fighters on intruder missions to German-occupied France, targeting airfields from which Luftwaffe bombers operated.

=== Nightfighter duties ===
On the night of 3 April, Hoare claimed a German aircraft as probably destroyed over Lille Nord, but was unable to verify the type. Later in the month, on the night of 21 April, he destroyed what was believed to be a Focke-Wulf Fw 200 Condor transport over St Leger airfield. During this time his squadron began switching to the Douglas A-20 Havoc, a light bomber converted into a night fighter. It was flying one of these aircraft that Hoare destroyed a Heinkel He 111 medium bomber and probably a Junkers Ju 88, another type of medium bomber, on the night of 3 May near Le Bourget. An unidentified type of aircraft was claimed by Hoare as damaged over Caen on the night of 11 May. His successes were recognised with an award of a Distinguished Flying Cross (DFC) in late May. The citation, published in the London Gazette, read:

Since January, 1941, this officer has carried out many night operational missions. His bombing attacks have been delivered with great skill often in the face of severe opposition from ground defences, and, despite the hazardous nature of these sorties, he seldom returns without valuable information. Flight Lieutenant Hoare has destroyed at least two enemy aircraft and certainly damaged others. He has shown great enthusiasm and gallantry throughout.

— London Gazette, No. 35176, 30 May 1941

During a sortie to Beauvais on the night of 13 September, Hoard destroyed one He 111 and damaged a second. He was promoted to temporary squadron leader at the end of the year. He damaged a pair of Dornier Do 217 medium bombers on the night of 2/3 April 1942, one over Conches airfield and the other near Évreux. Later in the month he took command of the squadron.

=== Squadron command ===
On the night of 28 May, Hoare claimed an aircraft he caught on the ground as probably destroyed. For some time, No. 23 Squadron had been carrying out bombing raids in addition to its intruder missions but in June, it began to receive the De Havilland Mosquito heavy fighter. The same month, Hoare was awarded a Bar to his DFC. The published citation read:

Since being awarded the Distinguished Flying Cross in May, 1941 this officer has completed some 38 intruder sorties during which he has destroyed at least 3 and damaged several more enemy aircraft. He has at all times set an inspiring example.

— London Gazette, No. 35583, 5 June 1942

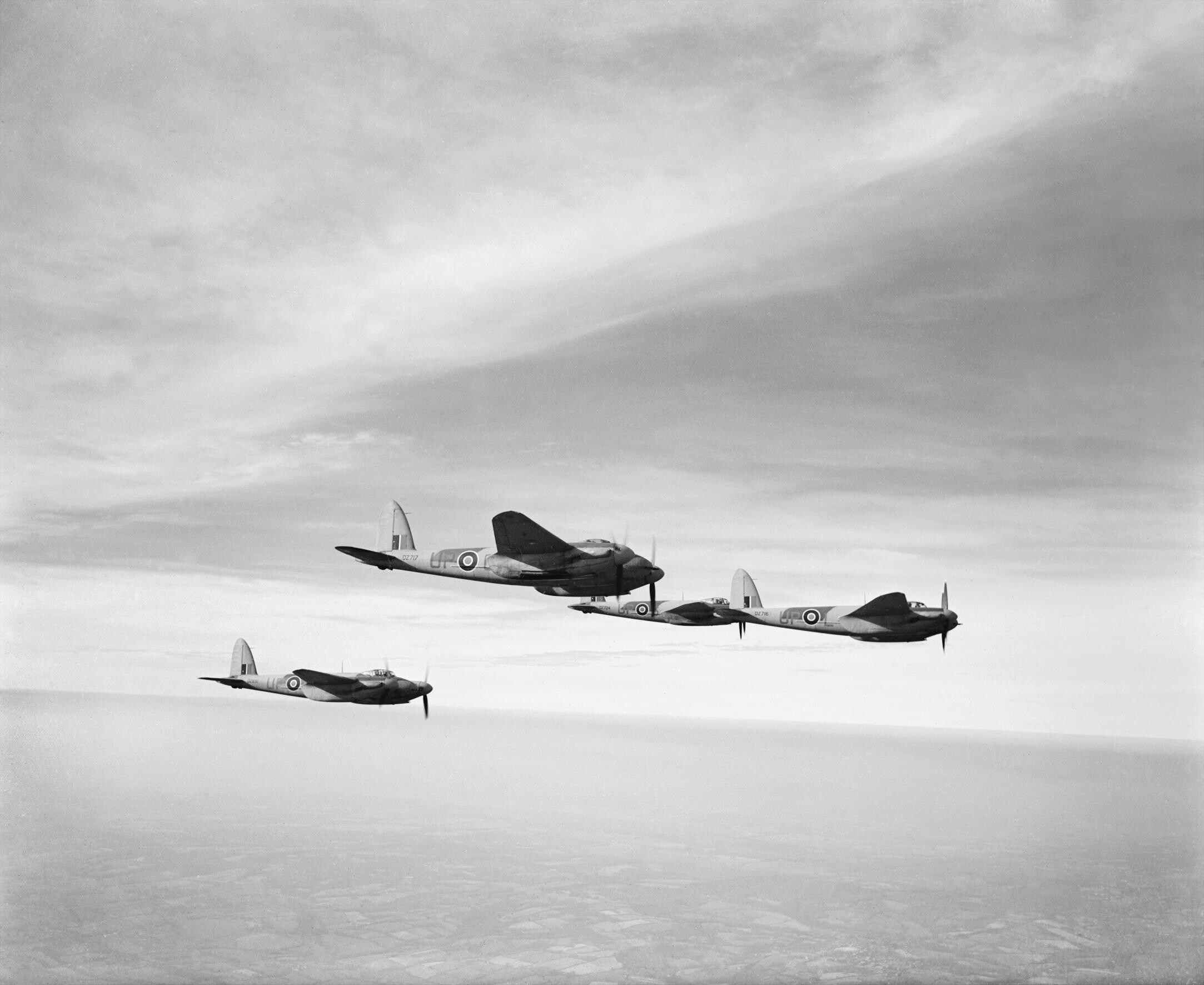
De Havilland Mosquitos of No. 605 Squadron

Hoare destroyed a Do 217 to the east of Chartres on the night of 6/7 July, the first claim for the squadron's Mosquitos. His temporary rank of squadron leader was made substantive two weeks later. He destroyed another aircraft on the night of 30 July near Orléans, although the type could not be determined. Another unidentified aircraft was shot down by Hoare to the south of Enschede on 11 September. This was to be his final aerial victory of the year for later in the month he was taken off operations and assigned to No. 51 Operational Training Unit (OTU) as instructor on the Mosquito. The next month, he was awarded the Distinguished Service Order (DSO). The published citation acknowledged his leadership of No. 23 Squadron and read:

This officer has completed numerous operational sorties over enemy occupied territory during which he has destroyed six enemy aircraft. Since Wing Commander Hoare assumed command, the squadron has destroyed at least seven enemy aircraft, and damaged others, a result reflecting the greatest credit on this officer's excellent leadership. He has inspired confidence in those under his command.

— London Gazette, No. 35736, 9 October 1942

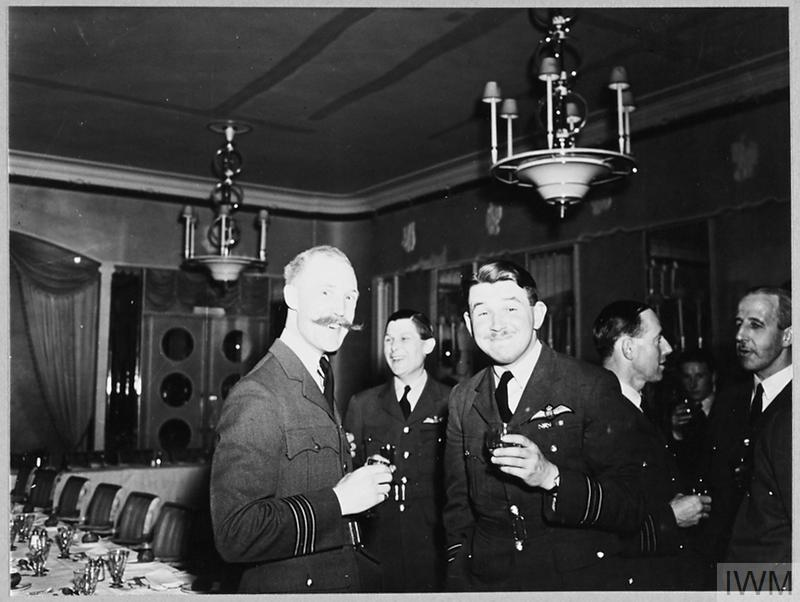
Hoare, left, at a dinner function for No. 605 Squadron in 1944; he was well known in the RAF for his handlebar mustache

In May 1943, Hoard was transferred to No. 60 OTU, again instructing on Mosquitos. He returned to operations in September with a posting as the commander of No. 605 Squadron. This was another night fighter squadron, operating Mosquitos on intruder missions from Castle Camps and then Bradwell Bay. Hoare made his first claim with his new unit on the night of 27 September when he shot down a Do 217 near Dedelstorf. Flying to the east of Chièvres in the evening of 10 January 1944, he destroyed a Junkers Ju 188 medium bomber. A few days later, Hoare received a mention in despatches. Returning to the area of Chievres on a sortie on 4–5 February, Hoare damaged one unidentified aircraft and probably destroyed a second. He damaged a further unidentified type of aircraft near Soesterberg on the night of 20/21 February. His last claim with No. 605 Squadron was for a Messerschmitt Bf 109 fighter on the night of 24 March.

Hoare was awarded a Bar to his DSO in April. His successful engagement of 24 March was not taken into account in the published citation, which read:

This officer has participated in more than 100 sorties, involving attacks on airfields in Germany, Belgium, Denmark, Holland and France, escorts to bomber formations and a' variety of other missions. He is a magnificent leader whose personal example of courage and devotion to duty has inspired all. In addition to his activities in the air, Wing Commander Hoare has devoted much of his energy and skill towards the training of other members of the squadron with excellent results. This officer, who has destroyed at least eight enemy aircraft, has rendered most valuable service.

— London Gazette, No. 36453, 4 April 1944

Relinquishing command of the squadron later in April, Hoare was promoted to acting group captain and appointed the commanding officer of the RAF station at Little Snoring. He remained in this post for the remainder of the war. One of the squadrons stationed there was his former unit, No. 23 Squadron, and flying one of its Mosquitos on the night of 29/30 August, he damaged two unidentified aircraft over Værløse in Denmark. At the end of the year his wing commander rank was made substantive.

== Postwar service ==
Hoare opted to remain in the RAF in the postwar period, being granted a permanent commission as a squadron leader on 1 September but remaining in his substantive wartime rank of wing commander. He was posted to Singapore, to serve at the headquarters of the RAF's Far East Air Force.

In 1947, Hoare was attached to the Royal New Zealand Air Force's ferry flight for the purpose of flying a recently acquired Mosquito from Singapore to New Zealand. He and his navigator, Flying Officer Walter Colvin, flew to Darwin, in Australia, and on 26 March took off from there to cross the Gulf of Carpentaria. Their destination was Townsville but the Mosquito never arrived. Despite aerial searching, it was not until a local of Mornington Island reported seeing aircraft wreckage in the shoals off Sydney Island in early April that their fate was able to be determined. It was believed that poor weather at the time of their flight may have resulted in them fatally crashing into the sea. The remains of the crew were recovered on 6 April and taken to Townsville for burial.

Hoare is commemorated on the Singapore Memorial at the Kranji War Cemetery in Singapore. He is credited with the shooting down of nine German aircraft, plus three more probably destroyed. One aircraft was considered probably destroyed on the ground, and he also damaged eight aircraft.
