= Lardil =

Lardil may refer to:

- Lardil people
- Lardil language
