= Sydney Island =

Sydney Island may refer to:

- Manra Island, one of the Phoenix Islands, Kiribati
- Sydney Island (Queensland), one of the Wellesley Islands in Australia
