= Sally Gabori =

Australian Indigenous Kaiadilt artist

Mirdidingkingathi Juwarnda Sally Gabori
- Born: c. 1924; Bentinck Island, Queensland
- Died: 11 February 2015 (aged 91); Mornington Island
- Known for: Painting, Weaving

Mirdidingkingathi Juwarnda Sally Gabori (circa 1924 – 11 February 2015) was an Aboriginal Australian artist who at age 81 began painting in an abstract-like style she developed to represent her Country, on the south side of Bentinck Island in Queensland, Australia.

She represented Australia in the 55th Venice Biennale of 2013, and her works are held in the permanent collections of the Musée du Quai Branly, Paris; the National Gallery of Australia; all of the Australian state galleries, and others.

== Early life ==
Gabori was born c.1924 at Mirdidingki on the south side of Bentinck Island, the largest island in the South Wellesley Group in the southern Gulf of Carpentaria, Queensland. As a young woman she lived a traditional lifestyle on Bentinck Island, largely uninfluenced by Europeans. She gathered food, including shellfish, from the complex system of stone fish traps her people had built in the shallows around the island. She helped to build and maintain the stone walls of the fish traps, was an adept maker of string, and weaver of dillybags and coolamons, and a respected singer of Kaiadilt songs, which tell of the close ties her people had with their country.

Gabori's tribal name is Mirdidingkingathi Juwarnda. Juwarnda' means "dolphin", her totemic sign, and Mirdidingkingathi means "born at Mirdidingki", in her country on the south side of Bentinck Island. The English name Gabori comes from her husband Pat Gabori, and is a corruption of his birthplace name, Kabararrjingathi.

Severe drought in 1942–45 and a cyclone in 1948 made Bentinck Island uninhabitable, and Presbyterian missionaries moved the entire Kaiadilt people to nearby Mornington Island, the biggest island in the South Wellesley group. The missionaries started moving the people during the 1940s, when there were fewer than 100 Kaiadilt people living on the island. They separated the children from their parents and placed into separate dormitories for boys and girls, while their parents built humpies around the mission. The final relocation in 1948 was spurred by the pollution of the islanders' water supply by seawater.

A small outstation was established on Bentinck Island in 1986 and some Kaiadilt people returned. Gabori did not return with them because her husband was too frail, but was able to visit occasionally.

== Career ==
In 2005, when she was 81, Sally and Pat Gabori were living in the Aged Person Hostel at Gununa on Mornington Island. Brett Evans had established the Mornington Island Arts and Crafts Centre to produce and market traditional crafts, including Gabori's fine weaving. She was offered paints for the first time at a workshop in April 2005. The Kaiadilt community had no two-dimensional art traditions before 2005, so Gabori had nothing to draw on but her memory of her country.

When Indigenous Australian artist Melville Escott looked at Gabori's first painting, he could identify "the river, sandbar, ripples the fish leave on the water, her brother King Alfred's country and the fish traps she used to look after". Her enthusiasm for painting grew until she was painting five days a week, every day the centre was open.

Towards the end of her career, Gabori painted collaborative works with two of her daughters, and encouraged her other daughters into the art centre, to help develop a new generation of Kaiadilt painters. Over the short eight years of her painting career, she produced over 2000 paintings, and almost all major institutions in Australia acquired her works. Gabori's work has featured in over 28 solo exhibitions and been part of more than 100 group exhibitions.

== Style ==
Her works have been described as abstract expressionism and gestural abstraction, but art theory was not an influence on her work, since Gabori had little English. Many of her paintings represent the sea, sky and land of her country, but she is thought to be not so much engaging with an audience as engaging with her country.

== Death and legacy ==
Gabori died on 11 February 2015.

== Awards and nominations ==
- 2012 Winner – The 2012 Gold Award
- 2012 Winner – Togart Contemporary Art Award

== Major exhibitions ==
- 2005 Sally's Story, Woolloongabba Art Gallery, Brisbane, Queensland, Australia
- 2013 Danda ngijinda dulk, danda ngijinda malaa, danda ngad – This is my Land, this is my Sea. This is who I am. A survey exhibition of paintings by Sally Gabori, 2005–2012, Drill Hall Gallery, Australian National University
- 2013 Personal Structures, 55th Venice Biennale 2013, Palazzo Bembo, Venice
- 2016 Dulka Warngiid – Land of All, 21 May 2016 – 28 Aug 2016, QAGOMA and 23 September 2016 – 29 January 2017, the Ian Potter Centre
- 2022 Mirdidingkingathi Juwarnda Sally Gabori – July 2022 to November 2022 – Fondation Cartier pour l'Art Contemporain, France

== Public collections ==
- Art Gallery of New South Wales (3 works, Dibirdibi country 2010, 2012, 2012)
- Art Gallery of South Australia
- Art Gallery of Western Australia
- Auckland Art Gallery Toi o Tomaki (Dibirdibi country, River at King Alfred's country and Dibirdibi country)
- Museum of Contemporary Art, Sydney (1 work, Makarrki 2008)
- Musée du Quai Branly (Ninjilki 2006)
- National Gallery of Australia (7 works including Nyinyilki 2009, My Country 2009)
- National Gallery of Victoria (11 works including Dibirdibi country, and Rockcod story place
- Queensland Art Gallery | Gallery of Modern Art, Brisbane
