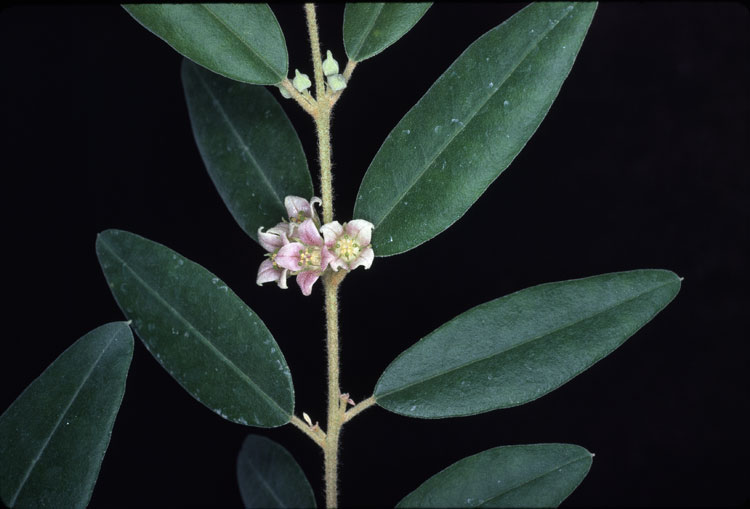
- B. lanceolata in the Australian National Botanic Gardens

Scientific classification
- Kingdom: Plantae
- Clade: Tracheophytes
- Clade: Angiosperms
- Clade: Eudicots
- Clade: Rosids
- Order: Sapindales
- Family: Rutaceae
- Genus: Boronia
- Species: B. lanceolata

Binomial name
- Boronia lanceolata F.Muell.
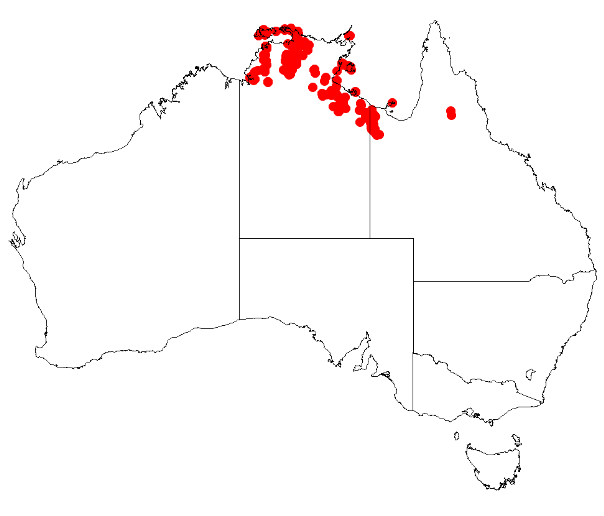
- Occurrence data from Australasian Virtual Herbarium

= Boronia lanceolata =

Species of flowering plant

Boronia lanceolata is a plant in the citrus family Rutaceae and is endemic to northern parts of the Northern Territory and Queensland. It is an erect shrub with many branches, elliptic to lance-shaped leaves and white or pink, four-petalled flowers. It is the most common boronia in the Northern Territory.

== Description ==
Boronia lanceolata is an erect shrub with many branches and that usually grows to 250 cm (100 in) high. Its branches and leaves are covered with star-like hairs. The leaves are usually arranged in opposite pairs and are elliptic to lance-shaped, 8–90 mm (0.3–4 in) long and 3–27 mm (0.1–1 in) wide with a petiole 3–16 mm (0.1–0.6 in) long. The flowers are white or pink and arranged in groups of between three and seven in leaf axils on a peduncle 0.5–9 mm (0.02–0.4 in) long. Unlike in other Northern Territory boronias, the petals are longer and wider than the sepals. The four sepals are triangular to egg-shaped, 1–3 mm (0.039–0.12 in) long and 1–2 mm (0.039–0.079 in) wide and do not increase in size as the fruit develops. The four petals are 2–5.5 mm (0.079–0.22 in) long and 1.5–3 mm (0.059–0.12 in) wide and increase in size as the fruit develops. Flowering occurs from May to February. The fruit is a capsule 3–4 mm (0.12–0.16 in) long and about 2 mm (0.08 in) wide.

== Taxonomy and naming ==
Boronia lanceolata was first formally described in 1859 by Ferdinand von Mueller who published the description in Fragmenta phytographiae Australiae. The specific epithet (lanceolata) is a Latin word meaning "spearlike".

== Distribution and habitat ==
This boronia grows in heath, woodland and forest on sandstome between Mornington Island and Westmoreland in Queensland to the Macadam Range and Tiwi Islands in the Northern Territory, where it is the most common boronia.

== Conservation ==
This boronia is classed as of "least concern" under the Northern Territory Government Parks and Wildlife Conservation Act and the Queensland Government Nature Conservation Act 1992.
