= South Wellesley Islands =

- Suburb
- Interactive map of South Wellesley Islands
- Coordinates: 17.0037°S 139.3634°E
- Country: Australia
- State: Queensland
- LGA: Shire of Mornington

Government
  - State electorate: Traeger
  - Federal division: Kennedy

Area
  - Total: 144.2 km^{2} (55.7 sq mi)

Population
  - Total: 0 (2021 census)
  - Density: 0.000/km^{2} (0.000/sq mi)
- Time zone: UTC+10:00 (AEST)
- Postcode: 4871

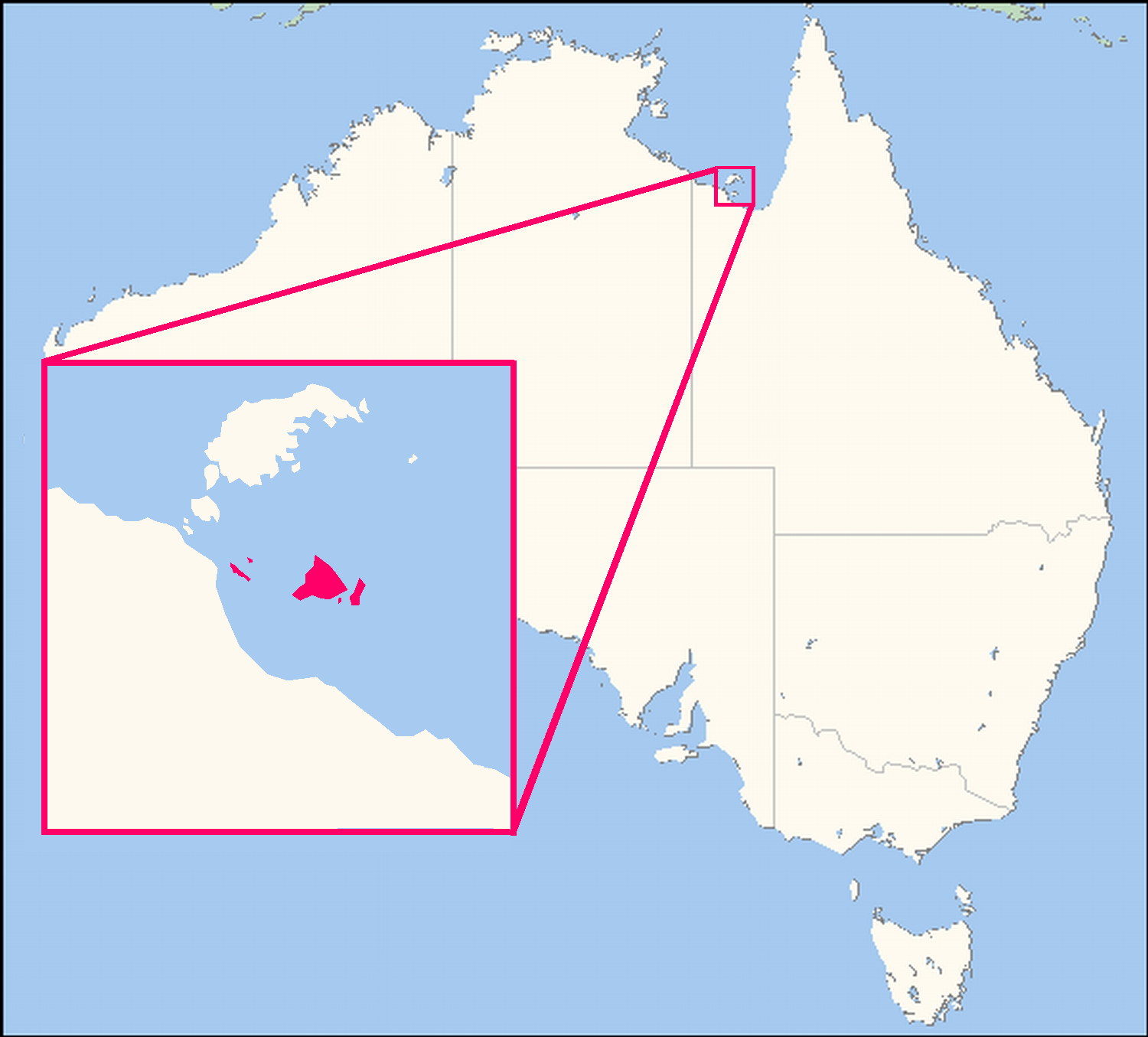
Location map of the South Wellesley Islands

The South Wellesley Islands is an island group and locality in the Gulf of Carpentaria within the Shire of Mornington, Queensland, Australia. The group is separate from the Wellesley Islands.

Bentinck Island is the only one known to have been inhabited in the past. In the 2021 census, South Wellesley Islands had "no people or a very low population".

== Geography ==
The islands, which lie in the Shire of Mornington, are (west to east):

- Allen Island
- Horseshoe Island
- Albinia Island
- Bentinck Island
- Fowler Island
- Sweers Island

== History ==
Kayardild language (also known as Kaiadilt, the name of the people of Bentinck Island, also spelt Gayadilta) is a language of the Gulf of Carpentaria. The Kayardild language region includes the landscape within the local government boundaries of the Mornington Shire Council.

Explorer Matthew Flinders charted the islands in 1802 and assigned European names to Bentinck Island, the island group (Wellesley) and the largest island (Mornington Island) in honour of Lord William Bentinck, who was then Governor of Madras, India, and Richard Wellesley, 2nd Earl of Mornington and Governor-General of Bengal. In 1803, the two men had acted as interceded on Flinders' behalf to persuade the French to release Flinders after he had been imprisoned by them on Mauritius.

Sometime around 1916, a man remembered only as McKenzie came to Bentinck Island and set up a sheep run, basing himself on a site at the mouth of the Kurumnbali estuary. He would ride over the island, accompanied by a pack of dogs, and shoot any Kaiadilt man who came within sight; in local memory, he murdered at least 11 people. He also kidnapped and raped native girls. He then moved to Sweers Island, and set up a lime kiln there. The Kaiadilt managed to return to Sweers only on McKenzie's departure. The massacre was only recorded by researchers in the 1980s.

Sweers Island was declared an Aboriginal reserve in 1934. After a cyclonic tidal surge swept the area in 1948, which followed fast on the severe drought that struck in 1946, the Kaiadilt were transferred by missionaries and the Queensland Government to Mornington Island, the largest island in the group. The uprooting effectively set in place the process of the destruction of both Kaiadilt culture and language since all children were restricted to dormitories, away from their parents and kin, and the transmission of the language and lore was lost. On Mornington Island they lived in a separate zone, in beach humpies facing Bentinck Island. They were looked down on by the Indigenous Lardil people of Mornington Island, who denied them access to the fishing grounds. Conditions were so severe that for several years all children were stillborn, creating a gap in the generations.

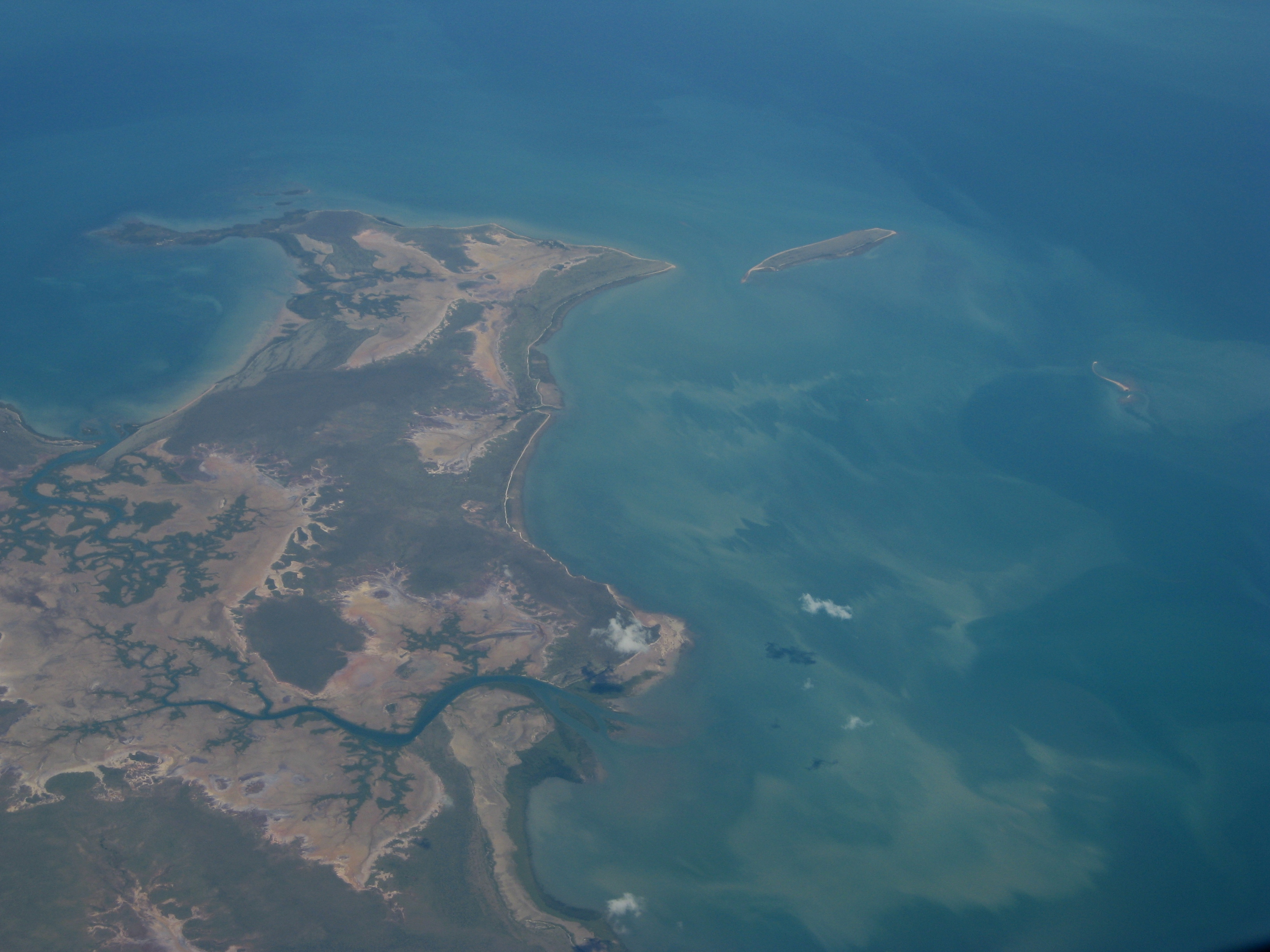
Southern part of Bentinck Island and Albinia Island

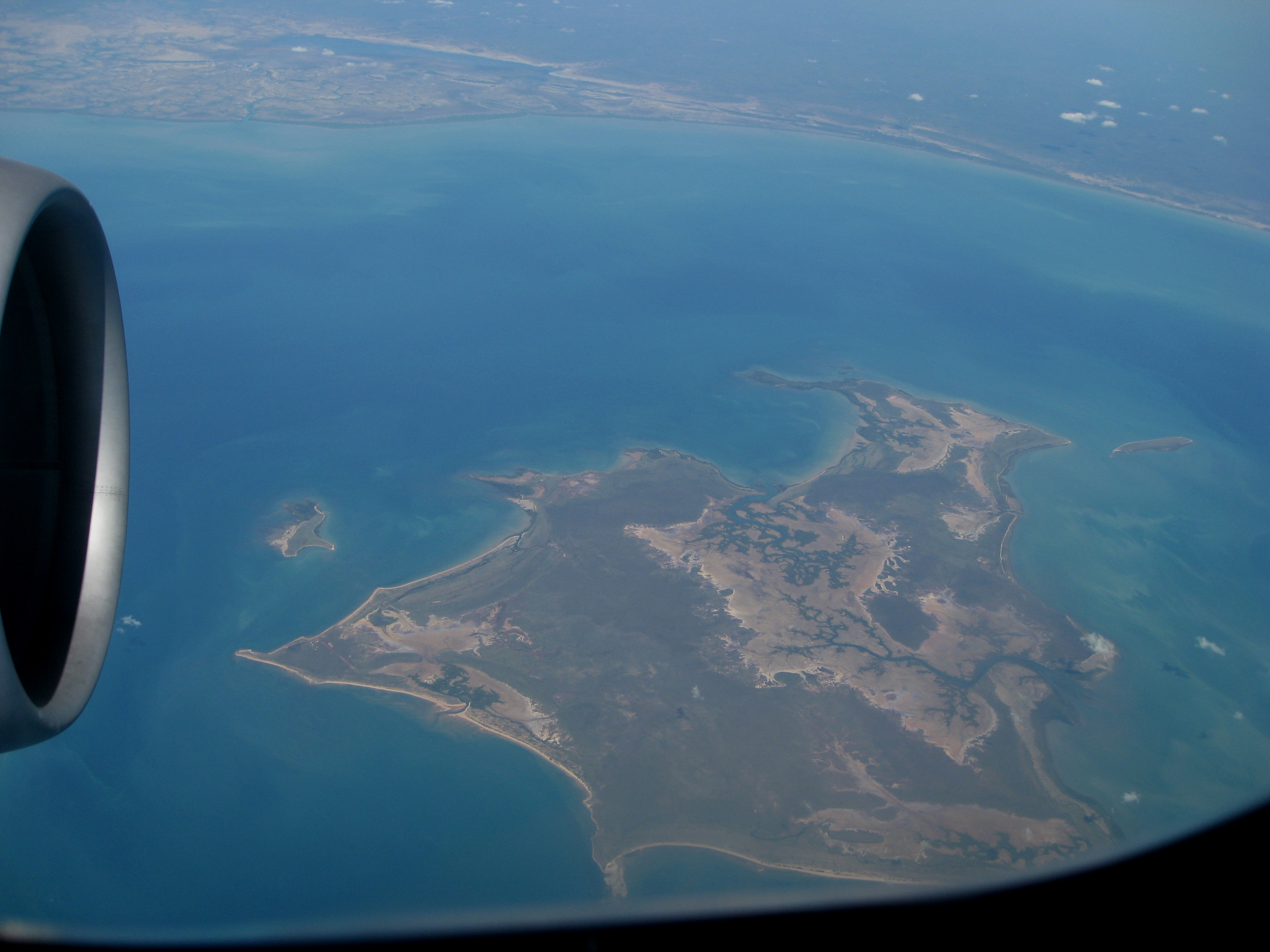
Bentinck Island with the Australian continent in the background

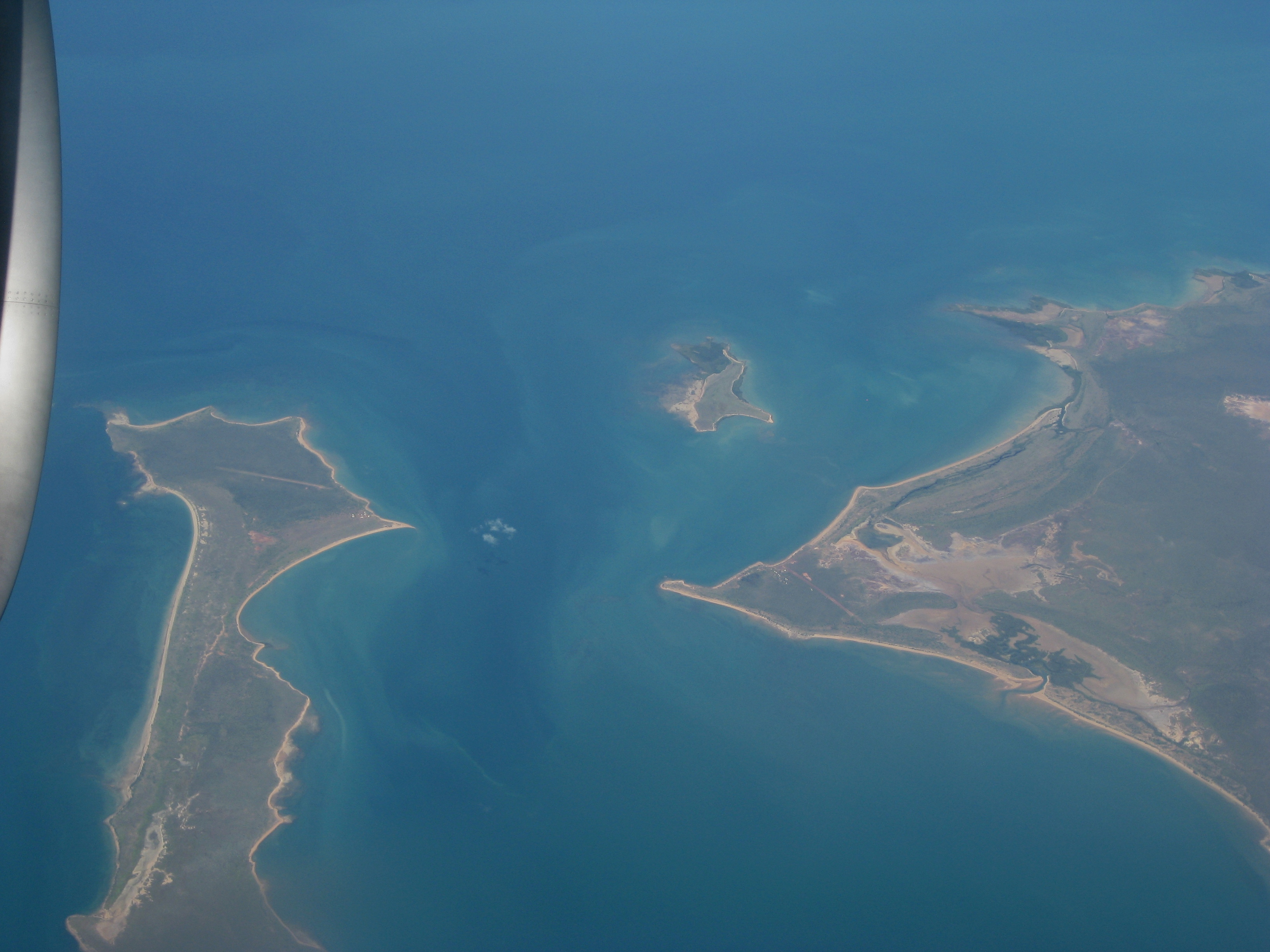
the small Fowler Island is located between Seers Island and Bentinck Island

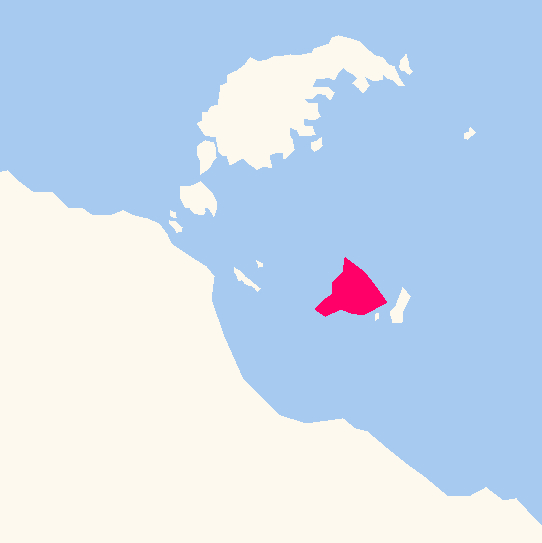
Location of Bentinck Island

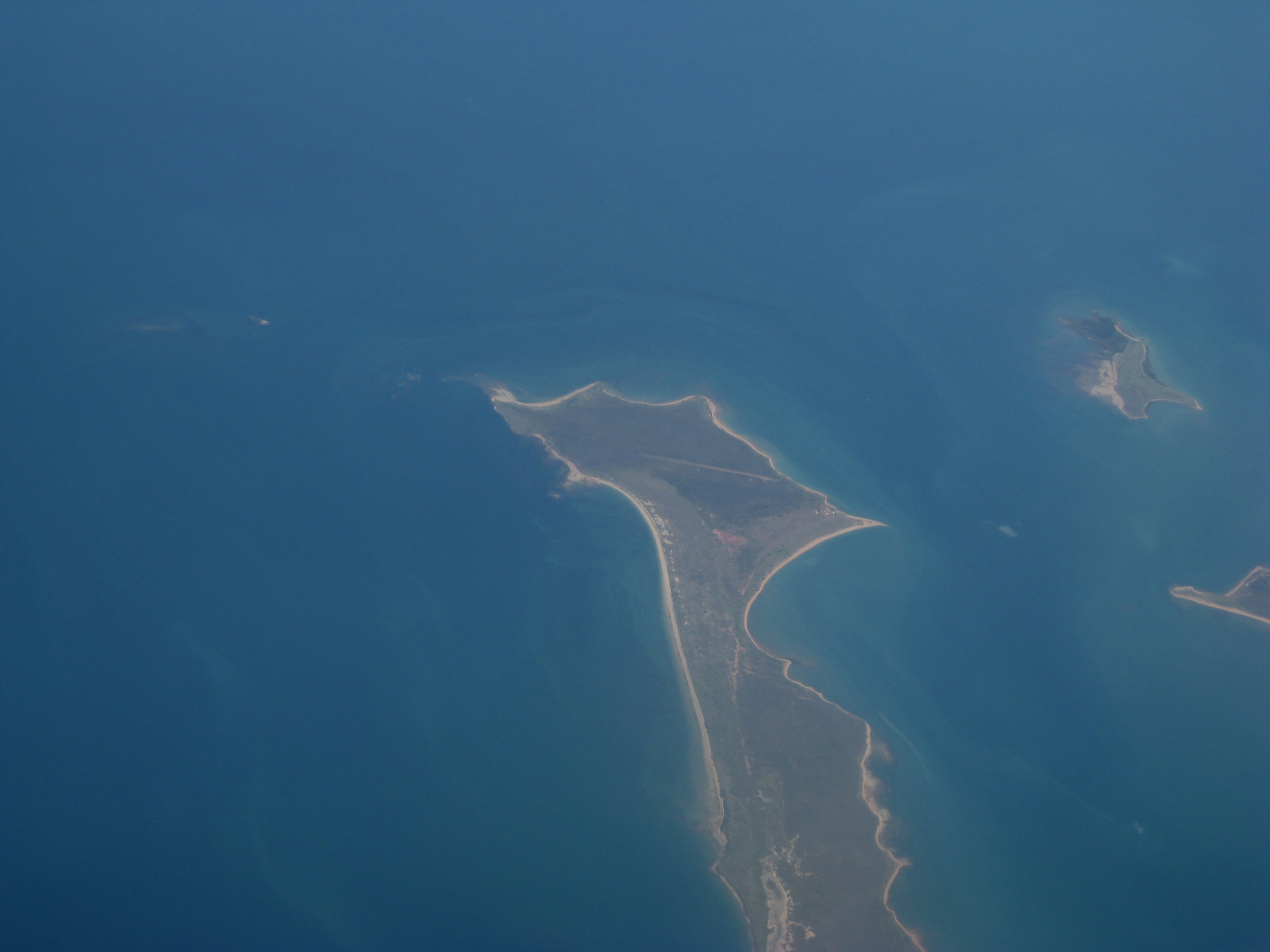
Southern part of Sweers Island

== Demographics ==
In the 2016 census, South Wellesley Islands had "no people or a very low population".

In the 2021 census, South Wellesley Islands had "no people or a very low population".

== See also ==
- List of islands in Australia
