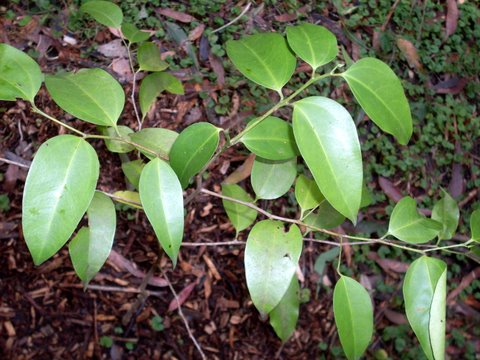

Conservation status
- Least Concern (NCA)

Scientific classification
- Kingdom: Plantae
- Clade: Embryophytes
- Clade: Tracheophytes
- Clade: Spermatophytes
- Clade: Angiosperms
- Clade: Eudicots
- Clade: Rosids
- Order: Rosales
- Family: Cannabaceae
- Genus: Celtis
- Species: C. paniculata

Binomial name
- Celtis paniculata Endl. & Planch.

Synonyms
- Celtis ingens F.Muell.; Celtis opaca C.Moore ex Benth.; Celtis palauensis Kaneh. & Hatus.; Solenostigma paniculatum Endl.; Sponia solenostigma Steud.; Trema integrifolium Takahide Hosokawa

= Celtis paniculata =

Species of tree in the hemp family

Celtis paniculata, commonly known as tripewood, silky keltis, silky celtis, native hackberry, native celtis, Investigator tree or whitewood, is a rainforest tree in the family Cannabaceae native to parts of Malesia, Melanesia and Australia.

== Description ==
The tree grows to 40 m (130 ft) tall and 90 cm (35 in) trunk width, though usually much smaller. The trunk is mostly cylindrical and somewhat buttressed at the base. The bark is thin, greyish brown and smooth, with pustular vertical lines.

=== Leaves ===
Leaves are elliptical in shape with a prominent leaf tip. Leaves are alternate and simple, smooth, not toothed, 6–10 cm (2.4–3.9 in) long with a pointed tip. The leaf stalk is somewhat channelled and flattened on the top, and 6–10 mm (0.2–0.4 in) in length. Both sides of the leaf are of a dull green shade. With a hand lens, translucent glands may be seen in the leaves. The base of the leaf is often oblique, that is of unequal length on either side of the leaf stem. Leaf venation is more evident on the underside of the leaf. An identifying feature is the intramarginal leaf vein, which starts at the leaf base and travels on either edge of the leaf, a distance of quarter to half the length of the leaf.

=== Flowers and fruit ===
Green flowers in axilliary cymes or panicles appear from December to January. The fruit is a blue to black, round to oval shaped drupe, 8–10 mm (0.3–0.4 in) long. containing a single seed which has veiny ridges. Fruit matures from July to March.

=== Germination and seedlings ===
Germination takes between 48 and 100 days. The cotyledons are large, about 30 mm (1.2 in) long by 25 mm (1 in) wide, with an apex divided into two acute lobes. The first pairs of juvenile leaves are often toothed. At the tenth leaf stage leaves become oval in shape with a prominent tip.

== Taxonomy & naming ==
This plant first appeared in scientific literature as Solenostigma paniculatum in 1833, published in the Prodromus Florae Norfolkicae by the Austrian botanist Stephan Endlicher. The type specimen was collected at Norfolk Island by the artist Ferdinand Bauer. The specific epithet paniculata refers to the tufted and branched flowers. In 1848 Jules Émile Planchon moved the species to the current genus.

=== Origin of the name 'Investigator Tree' ===
In 1802 the explorer Matthew Flinders discovered and named Sweers Island in the Gulf of Carpentaria during his circumnavigation of Australia in the sloop HMS Investigator, and he carved the word 'Investigator' into a tree on the island, a specimen of Celtis paniculata. The tree became well known amongst later explorers, who also carved the names of their vessels into the tree. When the tree was damaged by a tropical cyclone in 1887, part of the trunk was removed to the Queensland Museum.

== Distribution and habitat ==
C. paniculatta has a wide natural distribution in tropical Asia and the Pacific, including Borneo, the Moluccas, the Lesser Sunda Islands, the Caroline Islands, New Guinea, the Solomon Islands, Vanuatu, New Caledonia, and the Northern Territory and Queensland. In Australia it occurs from Kiama (34° S) in New South Wales to Cape York Peninsula, as well as on Norfolk Island.

It will grow in a variety of forest types, including sandy beach forests, rainforests, monsoon forests and sclerophyll forests, and on a variety of soil types, including soils derived from basalt, granite and limestone. It is often seen in coastal areas, but in northern parts of Queensland it can be found up to an altitude of 800 m (2,600 ft).

== Ecology & uses ==
Celtis paniculata is a food tree for the blue beak, common aeroplane, tailed emperor and other butterflies. Many rainforest pigeons and other birds feed on the fruit. An endangered population of the beetle Menippus darcyi feeds on Celtis paniculata. The tree produces a useful general purpose timber, with a specific gravity of 0.70.

== Gallery ==
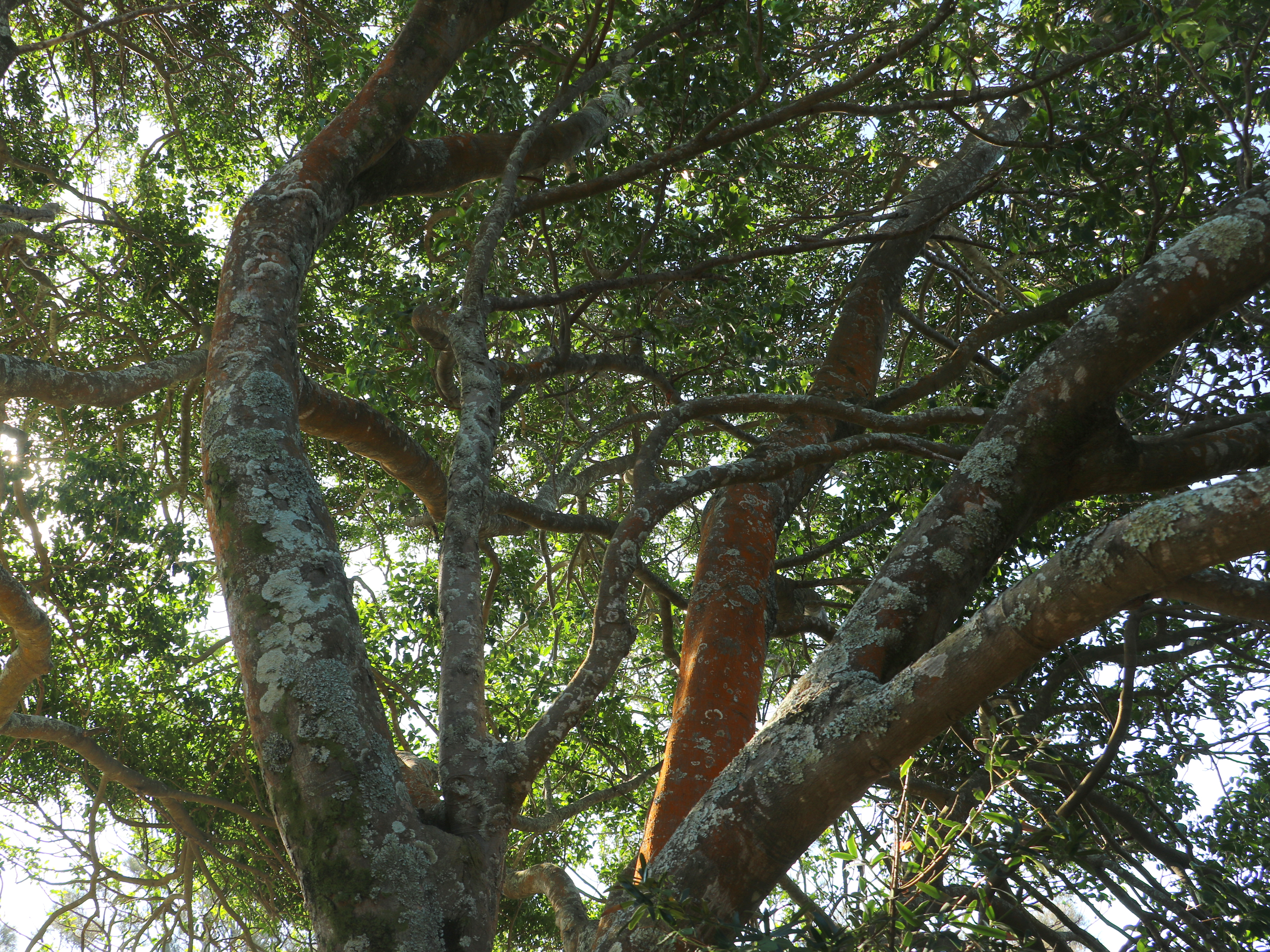
Growing at Bass Point, NSW

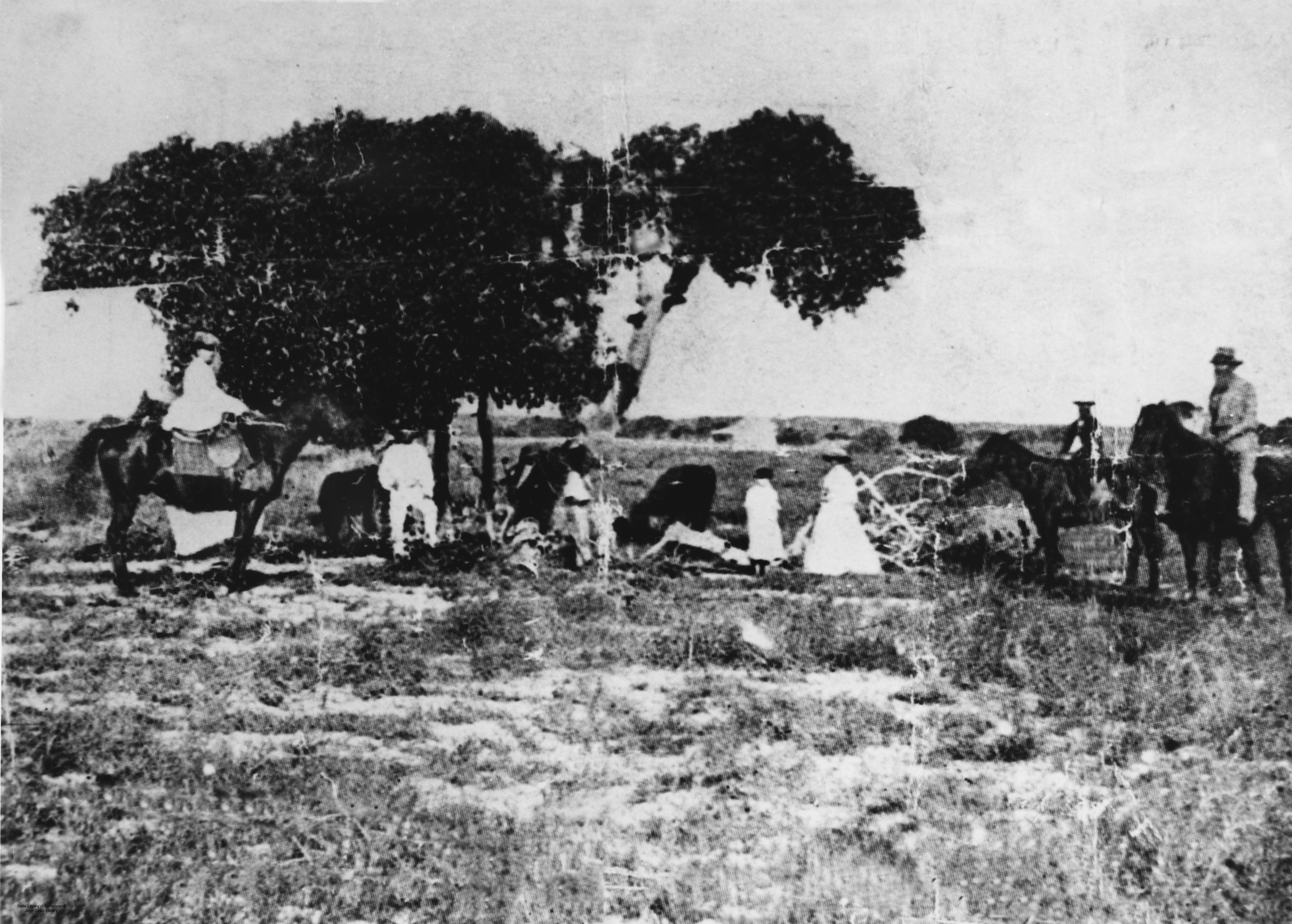
The original "Investigator Tree" on Sweers Island in 1871

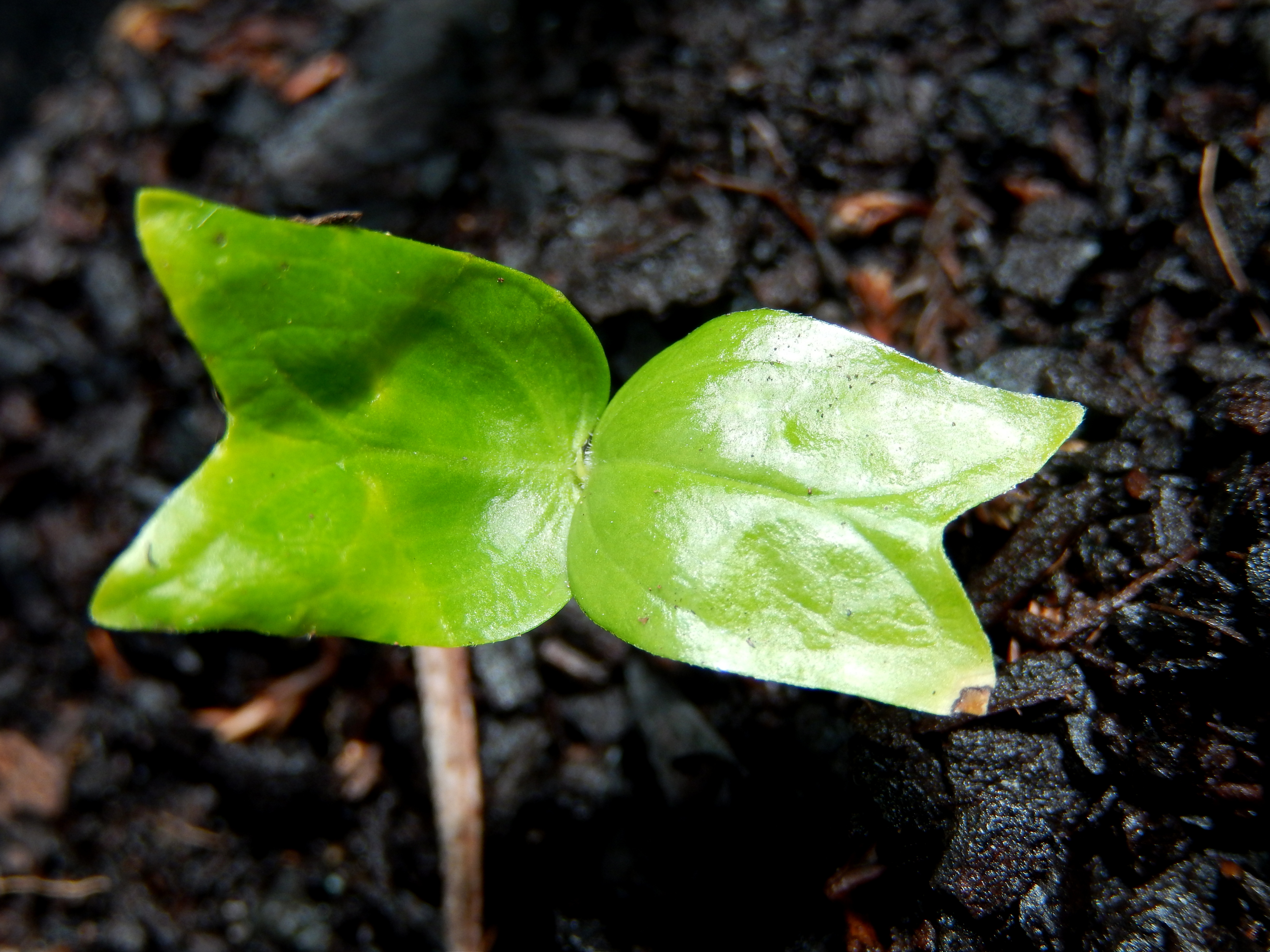
Cotyledons

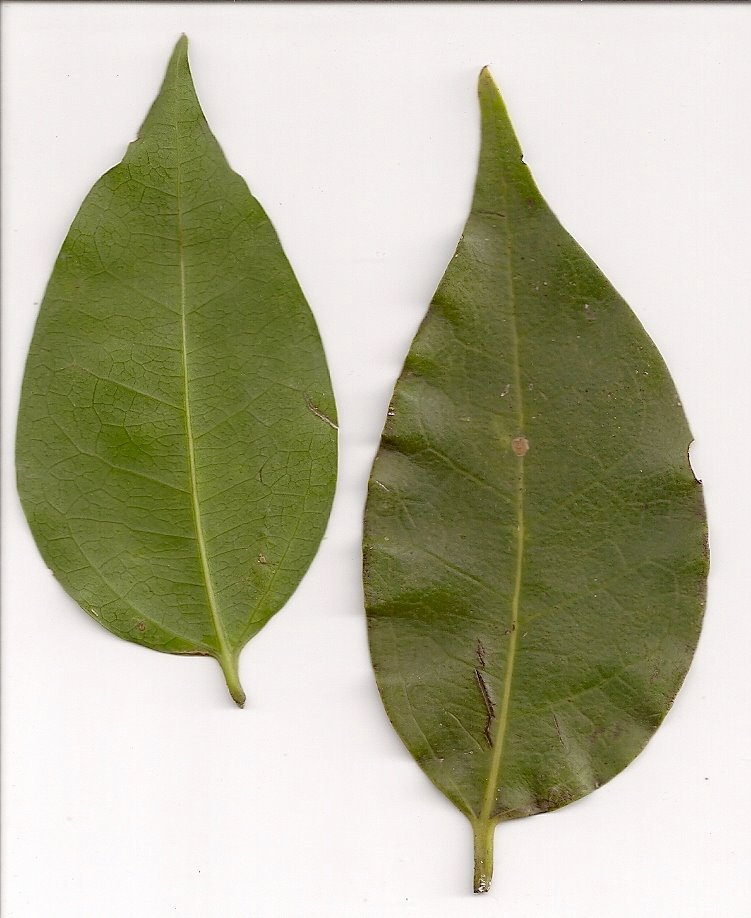
Mature leaves
