= Kaiadilt =

Australian Aboriginal ethnic group

The Kaiadilt are an Aboriginal Australian people of the South Wellesley group in the Gulf of Carpentaria, Queensland, Australia. They are native to Bentinck Island, but also made nomadic fishing and hunting forays to both Sweers and Allen Islands. Most Kaiadilt people now live on Mornington Island.

== Language ==
The Kayardild language is an agglutinating, completely suffixing member of the Tangkic languages, but unlike most Australian languages, including others classified under Tangkic including Yukulta, Kayardild exhibits a case morphology that is accusative, rather than ergative. Etymologically Kayardild is a compound formed from ka (ng) 'language' and yardild (a) 'strong', thus meaning 'strong language'.

Analysis of the grammar of Kayardild revealed that it provided an empirical challenge to a theorem regarding putative linguistic universals in natural languages. Steven Pinker and Paul Bloom asserted that "no language uses noun affixes to express tense", a claim that reflected a tradition in Western thought going back to Aristotle. (Note: De Interpretatione, 16b, 6-9: 'By as noun (onoma) we mean a sound significant by convention, which has no reference to time (...) A verb (rhema) is that which, in addition to its proper meaning, carries with it the notion of time'.) Nicholas Evans discovered a breach in the theory, for Kayardild happens to inflect not only verbs, but also nouns, for tense.

Kayardild was spoken by no more than perhaps 150 people, and by 1982, when Nicholas Evans began to record it, the numbers had declined to approximately 40. By 2005, only seven fluent speakers remained, and the last speaker of classical Kayardild died in 2015, though it is also reported that there was still one fluent female speaker as late as February 2017.

== Country ==
The territory of Bentinck Island and its contiguous reefs amount to roughly 70 square miles (180 km^{2}); the nation's western border lay at Allen Island.

== History ==
The Kaiadilt were mainly centred on Bentinck Island. Unlike many other northern Aboriginal groups, particularly those of Arnhem Land, they appear to have had little contact with Southern Asian island traders such as the Makassans, something attested by the lack of loanwords from the Malay, Buginese and Makassarese languages, though some early records indicate tamarind and teak had been harvested by visitors who had axes, and earthenware pots have been uncovered. They were generally diffident with strangers. The first white man to have set foot on the island was Matthew Flinders, captain of HMS Investigator in 1802.

Sometime around 1916, a man remembered only as McKenzie came to Bentinck Island and set up a sheep run, basing himself on a site at the mouth of the Kurumnbali estuary. He would ride over the island, accompanied by a pack of dogs, and shoot any Kaiadilt man who came within sight; in local memory, he murdered at least 11 people. He also kidnapped and raped native girls. He then moved to Sweers Island, and set up a lime kiln there. The Kaiadilt managed to return to Sweers only on McKenzie's departure. The massacre was only recorded by researchers in the 1980s.

Sweers Island was declared an Aboriginal reserve in 1934. After a cyclonic tidal surge swept the area in 1948, which followed fast on the severe drought that struck in 1946, the Kaiadilt were transferred by missionaries and the Queensland Government to Mornington Island. The uprooting effectively set in place the process of the destruction of both Kaiadilt culture and language since all children were restricted to dormitories, away from their parents and kin, and the transmission of the language and lore was lost. On Mornington Island they lived in a separate zone, in beach humpies facing Bentinck Island. They were looked down on by the Indigenous Lardil people, who denied them access to the fishing grounds. Conditions were so severe that for several years all children were stillborn, creating a gap in the generations. From the late 1960s onwards, the Kaiadilt began to return to their own islands.

=== Native title ===
In 1994, a Deed of Grant in Trust (DOGIT) was given to the original inhabitants, represented by the Kaiadilt Aboriginal Land Trust, which made a native title claim in 1996. The application concerned all the area covered from Bentinck and Sweer Islands' high water line for "as far as the eye could see". In The Lardil Peoples v State of Queensland [2004] FCA 298, the Federal Court accorded the owners rights to five nautical miles seaward.

== People and society ==
The Kaiadilt had the highest population density of all known Aboriginal Australian peoples, at 1.7 persons per square mile. They are characterised by having a high percentage, 43%, of B-group blood carriers, which is very rare within the continental Australian Aboriginal population. A high incidence of blond hair occurs among their children. Another feature that marks them off is that the Kaiadilt allow women to join in the circumcision rites. Their society, according to Norman Tindale, lacked the classificatory system characteristic of most Aboriginal Australian societies, though they were divided into eight kin groups (dolnoro).

=== Some words ===
- duljawinda ('car') literally 'ground-runner'
- wadubayiinda ('tobacco') form by combining wadu (smoke) with the root bayii- (be bitten); literal meaning is 'that by means of which the smoke is bitten'

Source: Evans 1998, p. 166

== Ecology and lifestyle ==
The Kaiadilt once thrived on what has been called a "sterile shelf of laterite covered flatland". The general area is characterised by reef-building corals, predominantly Acropora hyacinthus and the associated molluscs, some 400 varieties of which had been discovered by the early 1900s. For the Kaiadilt, Bentinck island was Dulkawalnged (the land of all) while the outlying Sweers and Allen islands were Dangkawaridulk (lands void of men). Despite the poor soil, a wide variety of vegetables were noted by early travellers. The basic arboreal cover consisted of small varieties of eucalyptus, casuarina and pandanus. The Kaiadilt lived on a maritime seafood economy, with nomadic movements determined by weather and seasons. The division of labour meant women gathered on the littoral such foods as small rock oysters (tjilangind), mud cockles (kulpanda) and crabs, while the men, when not harvesting the catch from rock fish traps (ngurruwarra), which are found one every .9 kilometres around Bentinck's coastline, but also along the shores of Sweers islands's calcareous peneplain, foraged more broadly for sharks, turtle and dugong. After the monsoonal rains, the rich silt flow from Queensland rivers into the Gulf lowered salinity allowing marine grasses on which the latter browsed to thrive.

== Mythology ==
Kaiadilt mythology was first collected by the anthropologist Norman Tindale, who began field work on the island in 1942. Their mythology evokes a mysterious being whose name means "he who walks behind" led the Kaiadilt to discover water, at Berumoi, by the northerly tip of Bentinck island.

The construction of the rock traps for fishing is attributed to the mythical creatures Bujuku (black crane) and Kaarrku (seagull).

== Alternative names ==
- Bentinck Islanders
- Gaiardilt
- Gajadild
- Kaiadil
- Maldanunda (from mala/malda, 'sea')
- Malununde, Malununda (a Lardil toponym for Bentinck Island)
- Mardunung, Madunun
- Marlanunda

Source: Tindale 1974, p. 173

== Notable people ==
- Mirdidingkingathi Juwarnda Sally Gabori, artist

== Sources ==
- Adamou, Evangelia (2015). "Distance in Tensed Nominals: A Typological Perspective". In Sonnenhauser, Barbara; Meermann, Anastasia (eds.). Distance in Language: Grounding a Metaphor. Cambridge Scholars Publishing. pp. 69–94. ISBN 978-1-443-87884-5.
- Best, Anna (2012). "The Aboriginal Material Culture of the Wellesley Islands and Adjacent Mainland Coast, Gulf". Queensland Archaeological Research. 15: 1–46. doi:10.25120/qar.15.2012.232.
- Edgerton, Robert B. (1992). Sick Societies: Challenging the Myth of Primitive Harmony. The Free Press. pp. 180–181. ISBN 978-0-02-908925-5.
- Evans, Nicholas (1995). A Grammar of Kayardild: With Historical-comparative Notes on Tangkic. Walter de Gruyter. ISBN 978-3-110-12795-9.
- Evans, Nicholas (1998). "Aborigines Speak a Primitive Language". In Bauer, Laurie; Trudgill, Peter (eds.). Language Myths. Penguin Books. pp. 159–168. ISBN 978-0-141-93910-0.
- Evans, Nicholas (2010). Dying Words: Endangered Languages and What They Have to Tell Us. John Wiley & Sons. ISBN 978-1-444-35961-9.
- Evans, Nicholas (24 March 2015). "Artist Sally Gabori had a language of her own". The Australian.
- Margolis, Zara; Tatham, Harriet (14 February 2017). "Translation app helping to preserve endangered Indigenous Queensland languages". ABC News.
- McDonald, John (5 July 2016). "Visual art review: Sally Gabori retrospective". The Sydney Morning Herald.
- Memmott, Paul (2007). Gunyah, Goondie + Wurley: The Aboriginal Architecture of Australia. University of Queensland Press. ISBN 978-0-702-23245-9.
- Pinker, Steven; Bloom, Paul (1990). "Natural language and natural selection". Behavioral and Brain Sciences. 13 (4): 707–727. doi:10.1017/S0140525X00081061. S2CID 6167614.
- Round, Erich R. (May 2017). "The Tangkic languages of Australia: Phonology and morphosyntax of Lardil, Kayardild and Yukulta". Oxford Research Encyclopedia of Linguistics.
- Saenger, Peter (2005). Sweers Island: changes over two hundred years since Flinders' visit (PDF). Southern Cross University Gulf of Carpentaria Scientific Study Report. pp. 1–22.
- Tindale, Norman Barnett (1974). "Kaiadilt (QLD)". Aboriginal Tribes of Australia: Their Terrain, Environmental Controls, Distribution, Limits, and Proper Names. Australian National University. ISBN 978-0-708-10741-6. Archived from the original on 11 October 2017.
