= Lardil people =

Aboriginal Australian ethnic group

The Lardil people, who prefer to be known as Kunhanaamendaa (meaning people of Kunhanhaa, the traditional name for Mornington Island), are an Aboriginal Australian people and the traditional custodians of Mornington Island in the Wellesley Islands chain in the Gulf of Carpentaria, Queensland.

== Language ==
Lardil, now moribund, belongs to the Tangkic language family. The feature of kinship-sensitive pronominal prefixes had been ignored until they were discovered by Kenneth L. Hale in a study of Lardil. A special second language, Damin, thought of as a tongue created by the Yellow Trevally fish ancestor Kaltharr, and devised in part to mimic "fish talk", was taught during the second degree of initiation (warama). This initiation register of specialized Lardil has fascinated linguists: it contained in its phonemic repertoire two types of airstream initiation, a pulmonic ingressive [ɬ↓ʔ] ⟨l*⟩ and a labiovelar lingual egressive [ʘ↑] ⟨p'⟩, unique among the world's languages. The secret language reinscribed in what looks like an indigenous form of semantic analysis the entire Lardil vocabulary into 200 words and has been described by Hale as a "monument to the human intellect". Since Damin was a language involving rituals disapproved of by the missionaries, it disappeared with the outlawing and suppression of the Lardil ritual cycles.

== Ecology and lifestyle ==
Rockwall fish traps (derndernim) were constructed off the coast to catch varieties of fish as the tides receded. The Lardil had a meticulous ethnobotanical knowledge and David McKnight has argued that "their botanical taxonomy is of the same intellectual order as our botanical scientific taxonomy".

People raised within the mission, once detached from the hunter and gatherer lifestyle of the traditional community, were considered good workers to recruit for the pastoral stations, where they were employed as drovers and ringers. Once the mission was closed, the elderly once more regained some control. However the Lardil people who had spent their mature years on the mainland as farm workers had no traditional background for raising children to draw on. The result was that the generation of children raised from the 1960s onwards had no grasp of either the old or new work technologies and ethics.

== Christian mission ==
With the exception of Sweers Island, all the Wellesley Islands were set aside as an Aboriginal reserve. Generally, once Aboriginal resistance to the take-over of their lands was broken, they were concentrated in reserves and missions. Presbyterian missionaries were granted permission to establish a mission on Mornington Island, and one was duly built in 1914. A mission was established on Mornington Island by the Rev. Robert Hall, his wife and two assistants, Mr and Mrs Owen, and Hall strove to institute economic self-sufficiency for the islanders' economy, having an all-native crew manning the ketch, while organising the harvesting and curing of trepang. Their initial presence, according to one account, was received positively by the Lardil people. Hall was speared and killed in 1917 by a Lardil man, "Burketown Peter/Bad Peter" a respected drover based in Burketown, who ran into trouble, often standing up for his rights, and wanted to kill a cattle station owner with whom he fell out, but was dissuaded from doing so and told by Ganggalida people to return to his home country after refusing to obey local demands that he move back to the mainland.

=== Dormitory system ===
Hall was succeeded by the Rev. Wilson, who imposed a dormitory system, segregating children from their elders and thus breaking the chain of tradition through which tribal lore and law was transmitted. The older generations were normally left to their own devices as missionaries concentrated on separating them from their children, and concentrating their efforts on the youngest: aside from religious indoctrination, sexual and marriage customs were challenged, and subject to control. Few of the Lardil girls brought up in the dormitory married according to the traditional kinship rules, given that the mission head played an influential role as intermediary. The dormitory system was discontinued in 1954.

== Self-government ==
The population of the island is no longer exclusively Lardil, after several tribal groups, among them the Kaiadilt, were relocated by missionaries from Bentinck Island.

The Mornington Island Mission was substituted by a community administration in 1978. The Shire council in the 1970s introduced a beer canteen, government developmental funds were seen as allowing one to dispense with the necessity to work, and, as alcoholism spread, the Mornington Island peoples began to rank among the communities with the highest rate of suicide in Australia. Interpersonal violence was common, including domestic violence; a few young white women have formed relationships with island youths and moved to the island, to find that their boyfriend's behaviour changed and their anticipated idyll close to nature did not materialize. "They usually departed after their first "proper good hiding" and invariably by the second".

Mornington Island, with its schools, churches, libraries and hospitals, is often presented as a model community to outsiders. However, by 2003 its society and its people had been devastated by alcohol. In the early 2000s the community was declared "dry" and importation of alcohol was forbidden. By 2021 dangerous amounts of strong home-brewed alcoholic drink and of "sly grog" (smuggled alcoholic drink) were being consumed, and petrol sniffing was common. Diets were poor, consisting mainly of imported heavily-processed foods; Save the Children were trying to combat malnutrition among children, and among adults diabetes and renal failure were common. Average life expectancy was 53, twenty years shorter than Australians generally. A local councillor said that "Prohibition on Mornington Island has become part of the problem instead of the solution" and the council was considering reopening a tavern.

== Alternative names ==
- Kunhanaamendaa, as the people themselves prefer to be called, meaning the people of Kunhanhaa; they refer to the language only as Lardil.

According to Tindale:

- Lardi:i (typo)
- Laierdila
- Ladil
- Kunana (name for Mornington Island)
- Kuna'na
- Gunana
- Mornington Island tribe
- Kare-wa (dialect name according to Walter Roth)

== Notable people ==
- Dick Roughsey, artist
- Charlie Cameron, Australian rules footballer
- Jarrod Cameron, Australian rules footballer

== Sources ==
- Alpher, Barry (1993). "Out-of-the-ordinary Ways of using a language". In Walsh, Michael; Yallop, Colin (eds.). Language and Culture in Aboriginal Australia. Aboriginal Studies Press. pp. 97–106. ISBN 978-0-855-75241-5. Can Threatened Languages be Saved?.
- Best, Anna (2012). "The Aboriginal Material Culture of the Wellesley Islands and Adjacent Mainland Coast, Gulf". Queensland Archaeological Research. 15: 1–46. doi:10.25120/qar.15.2012.232.
- Bond, Hilary (March 2004). 'We're the mob you should be listening to': Aboriginal Elders talk about community-school relationships on Mornington Island (PDF) (PhD thesis). James Cook University. Archived (PDF) from the original on 11 August 2018.
- Clarke, Philip A. (2011). Aboriginal People and Their Plants. Rosenberg Publishers. ISBN 978-1-921-71973-8.
- Donovan, Val (2014). The Reality of a Dark History: From contact and conflict to cultural recognition of Aboriginals and Torres Strait Islanders. Australian eBook Publisher. ISBN 978-1-925-17726-8.
- Evans, Nicholas (1995). A Grammar of Kayardild: With Historical-comparative Notes on Tangkic. Walter de Gruyter. ISBN 978-3-110-12795-9.
- Evans, Nicholas (2007). "Warramurrungunji Undone: Australian Languages in the 51st Millenium". In Austin, Peter; Simpson, Andrew (eds.). Endangered Languages. Buske Verlag. ISBN 978-3-875-48465-6.
- Finger, Jarvis (2012). A Cavalcade of Queensland's Crimes and Criminals: Scoundrels, Scallwags & Psychopaths: the Colonial Years and Beyond 1859-1920. Boolarong Press. ISBN 978-1-922-10905-7.
- Jacobs, Margaret D. (2009). White Mother to a Dark Race: Settler Colonialism, Maternalism, and the Removal of Indigenous Children in the American West and Australia, 1880-1940. University of Nebraska Press. ISBN 978-0-803-21100-1.
- McKnight, David (2003). Hunting to Drinking: The Devastating Effects of Alcohol on an Australian Aboriginal Community. Routledge. ISBN 978-1-134-48709-7.
- Memmott, Paul (2007). Gunyah, Goondie + Wurley: The Aboriginal Architecture of Australia. University of Queensland Press. ISBN 978-0-702-23245-9.
- Rolls, Mitchell; Johnson, Murray (2010). Historical Dictionary of Australian Aborigines. Scarecrow Press. ISBN 978-0-810-87475-6.
- Roughsey, Dick (1972). Moon and Rainbow: Autobiography of an Aboriginal. Reed. ISBN 978-0-589-00665-5.
- Scambary, Benedict (2013). My Country, Mine Country: Indigenous People, Mining and Development Contestation in Remote Australia. Australian National University Press. ISBN 978-1-922-14473-7.
- Sharp, Lauriston (December 1935). "Semi-Moieties in North-Western Queensland". Oceania. 6 (2): 158–174. doi:10.1002/j.1834-4461.1935.tb00178.x. JSTOR 40327545.
- Tindale, Norman Barnett (1974). "Lardiil (QLD)". Aboriginal Tribes of Australia: Their Terrain, Environmental Controls, Distribution, Limits, and Proper Names. Australian National University Press.
- Trigger, David Samuel (1992). Whitefella Comin': Aboriginal Responses to Colonialism in Northern Australia. Cambridge University Press. ISBN 978-0-521-40181-4.
