= Bentinck Island, Queensland =

Island in Queensland, Australia

- Location within Queensland

Geography
- Location: Queensland
- Coordinates: 17°03′36″S 139°30′00″E
- Adjacent to: Gulf of Carpentaria

Administration
- Australia
- State: Queensland
- Capital and largest city: Brisbane
- Area covered: 180 km^{2} (69 sq mi)

Demographics
- Population: 0 (2016)

Additional information
- Time zone: Australian Central Standard Time (ACST)
- ISO code: AUS

Bentinck Island is one of the South Wellesley Islands, in Queensland's Gulf of Carpentaria. The traditional home of the Kaiadilt people, the island was the site of a brutal massacre in 1918 known as the McKenzie massacre, in which many Indigenous inhabitants died.

== History ==
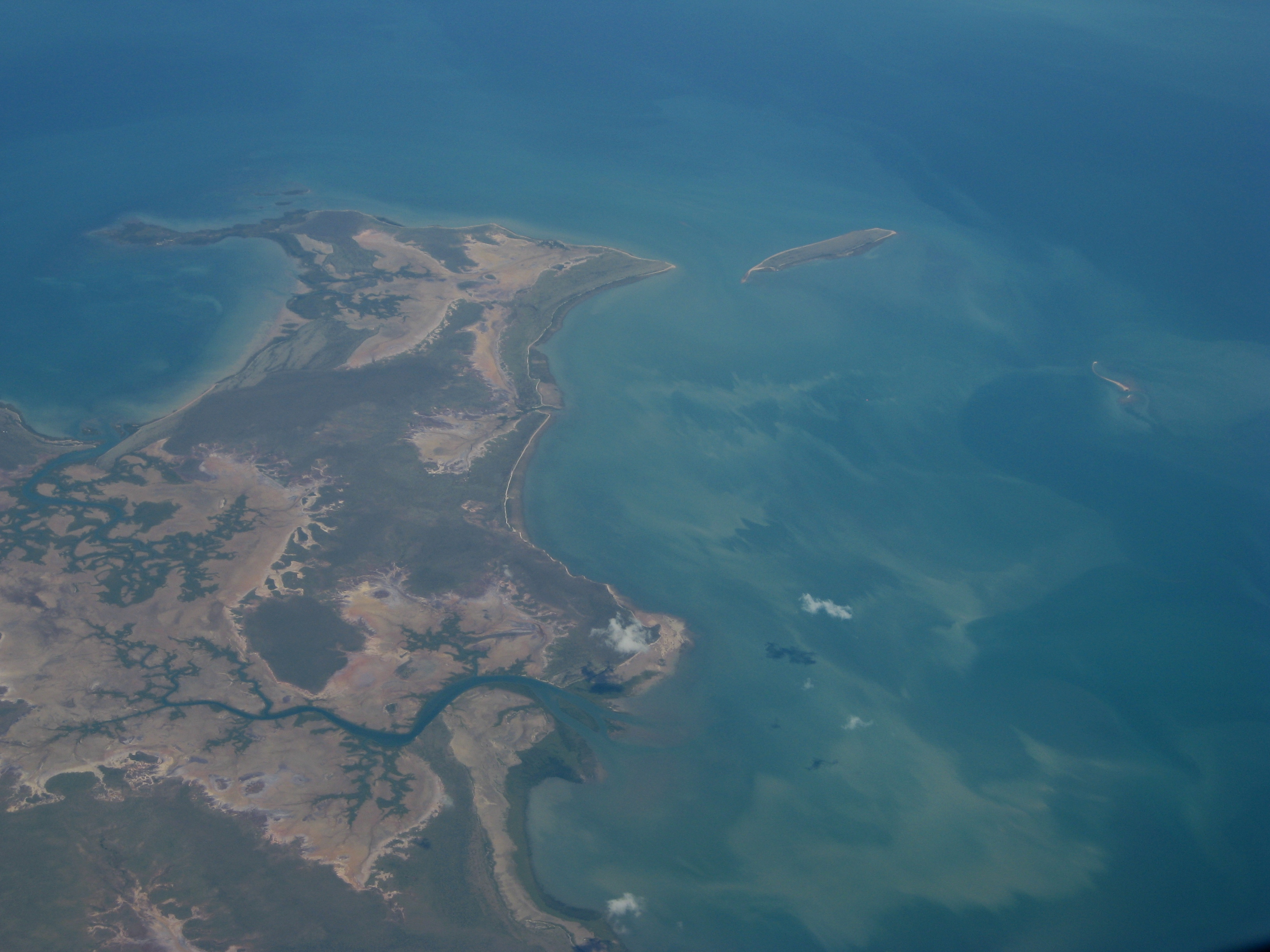
Southern part of Bentinck Island and Albinia Island

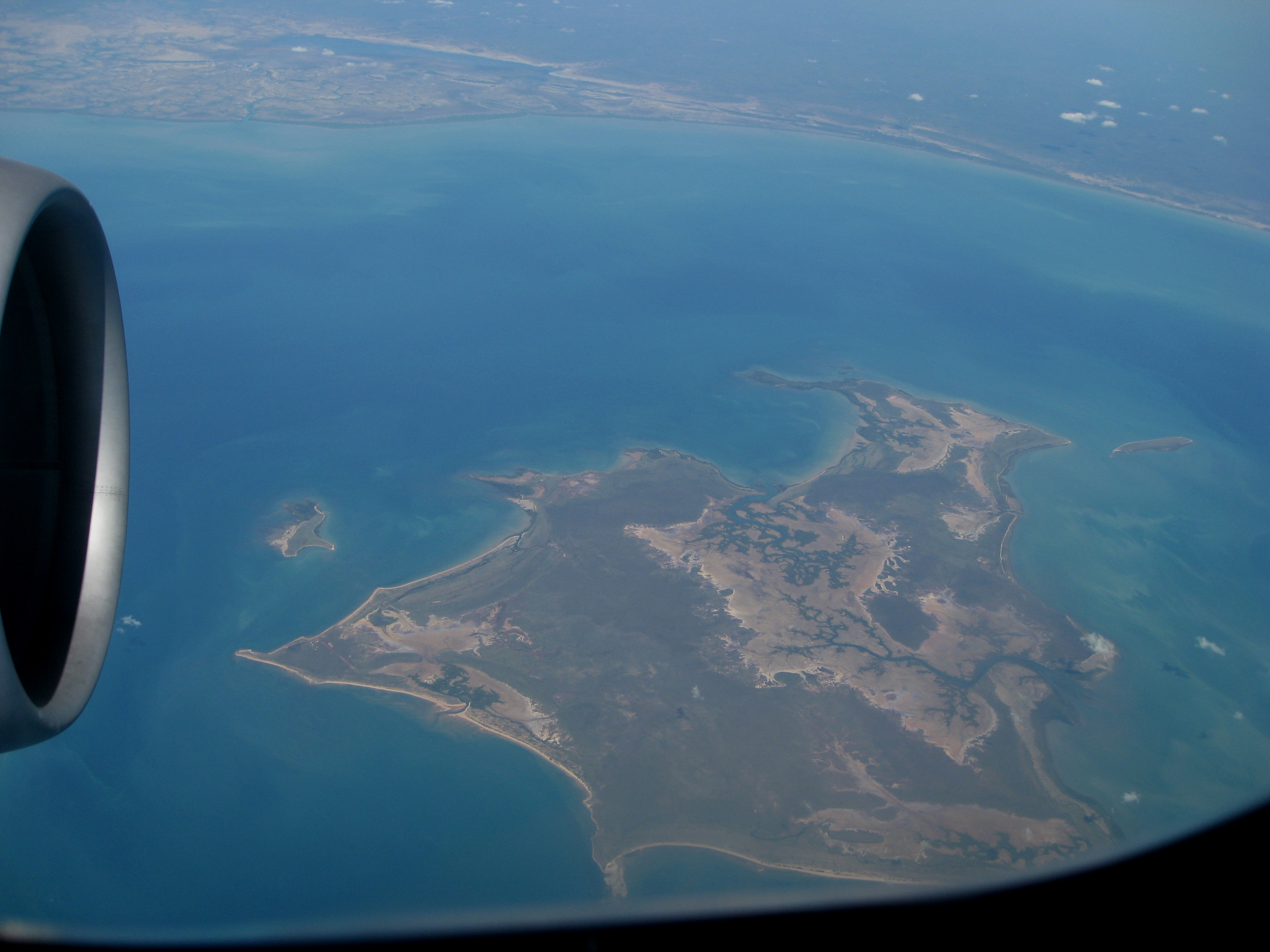
Bentinck Island with the Australian continent in the background

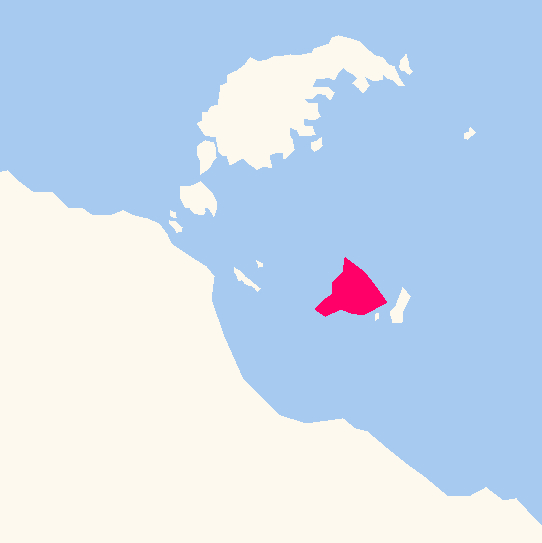
Location of Bentinck Island

For thousands of years, the Kaiadilt tribal group of Aboriginal Australians lived in near-isolation on the island, speaking their Kayardild language. Their original name for the island is not definitely known. Explorer Matthew Flinders charted the islands in the gulf in 1802 and assigned European names to the island groups (Wellesley and South Wellesley Islands) and the largest island of the Wellesley Island group (Mornington Island) in honour of Richard Wellesley, 2nd Earl of Mornington and Governor-General of India, as well as Bentinck Island, in honour of Lord William Bentinck, then Governor of Madras, India. In 1803, the two men had interceded on Flinders's behalf to persuade the French to release Flinders after he had been imprisoned by them on Mauritius.

The people of Bentinck Island would visit Allens Island and Sweers Islands on hunting and gathering expeditions; women gathered "tjilangind" (small rock oysters), "kulpanda" (arca clams) and crabs, while the men hunted fish, turtle, sharks and dugong, using spears. They used "rafts formed from logs tied together with strings of plaited bark" for transport among the islands.

In 1861, HMVS Victoria and the Firefly, carrying the William Landsborough search party for Burke and Wills, formed a land base on Sweers Island after visiting Bentinck, which was inhabited by "hostile blacks".

Sometime around 1916, a man remembered only as McKenzie came to Bentinck Island and set up a sheep run, basing himself on a site at the mouth of the Kurumnbali estuary. He would ride over the island, accompanied by a pack of dogs, and shoot any Kaiadilt man who came within sight; in local memory, he murdered at least 11 people. He also kidnapped and raped native girls. He then moved to Sweers Island, and set up a lime kiln there. The Kaiadilt managed to return to Sweers only on McKenzie's departure. The massacre was only recorded by researchers in the 1980s.

The Kaiadilt people continued to live according to their traditional way of life until the 1940s, which included fishing for mullet and harvesting fruit from the mangroves, and obtaining fresh water by digging in swamps. In the 1940s, Presbyterian missionaries arrived and started relocating the people to their mission station on Mornington Island, the biggest island in the Wellesley Islands group. At this time there were fewer than 100 Kaiadilt people living on the island. The missionaries separated the children from their parents and placed them into separate dormitories for boys and girls, while their parents built humpies around the mission. It was ten years after the relocation, completed in 1948, before one of the removed Kaiadilt woman gave birth to a child who survived. The final relocation was spurred by the pollution of the islanders' water supply by seawater.

In 1960 and 1962, anthropologist Norman Tindale accompanied several Kaiadilt elders back to Bentinck Island to record genealogies and map the island, listing more than 300 place names. He recorded the name of the island as "Dulka Warngiid" (or Dulkawalnged), which he translated as "the land of all".

In the early 1980s, linguist Nicholas Evans visited Mornington and Bentinck Islands to document the Kayardild language, of which there were 45 fluent speakers left.

In 1986, an outstation was established at Nyinyilki, on the south-eastern corner of the island. Over time, a small township, which included homes, a shop and airstrip were built, and through the 1990s a small group, mostly elders caring for young children, lived there, causing it to be nicknamed the "old ladies' camp".

== Today ==
There are no permanent inhabitants on the island. Some of the women from the "old ladies' camp", after moving to Mornington Island again in the 21st century, formed the Kaiadilt art movement, led by Sally Gabori (c.1924–2015). They mapped their traditional lands in their artwork. Those who are young and fit enough to visit the island still do so. The men and boys visit in family groups to catch turtle and dugong in the waters of the island, and the state school and art centre on Mornington Island are working with Kaiadilt elders to help revive their language and culture. The people remain deeply connected to the island, although they acknowledge that there is no possibility of moving back there.

== Geography ==
The island has an area of around 180 km^{2} (69 sq mi), consisting of mainly arid land, with reefs off the coast.

== Notable people ==
- Sally Gabori, artist

== See also ==
- List of islands in Australia
- Mornington Island Art
