= Mornington Island =

Island off the coast of Australia

Mornington
Native name: Kunhanhaa
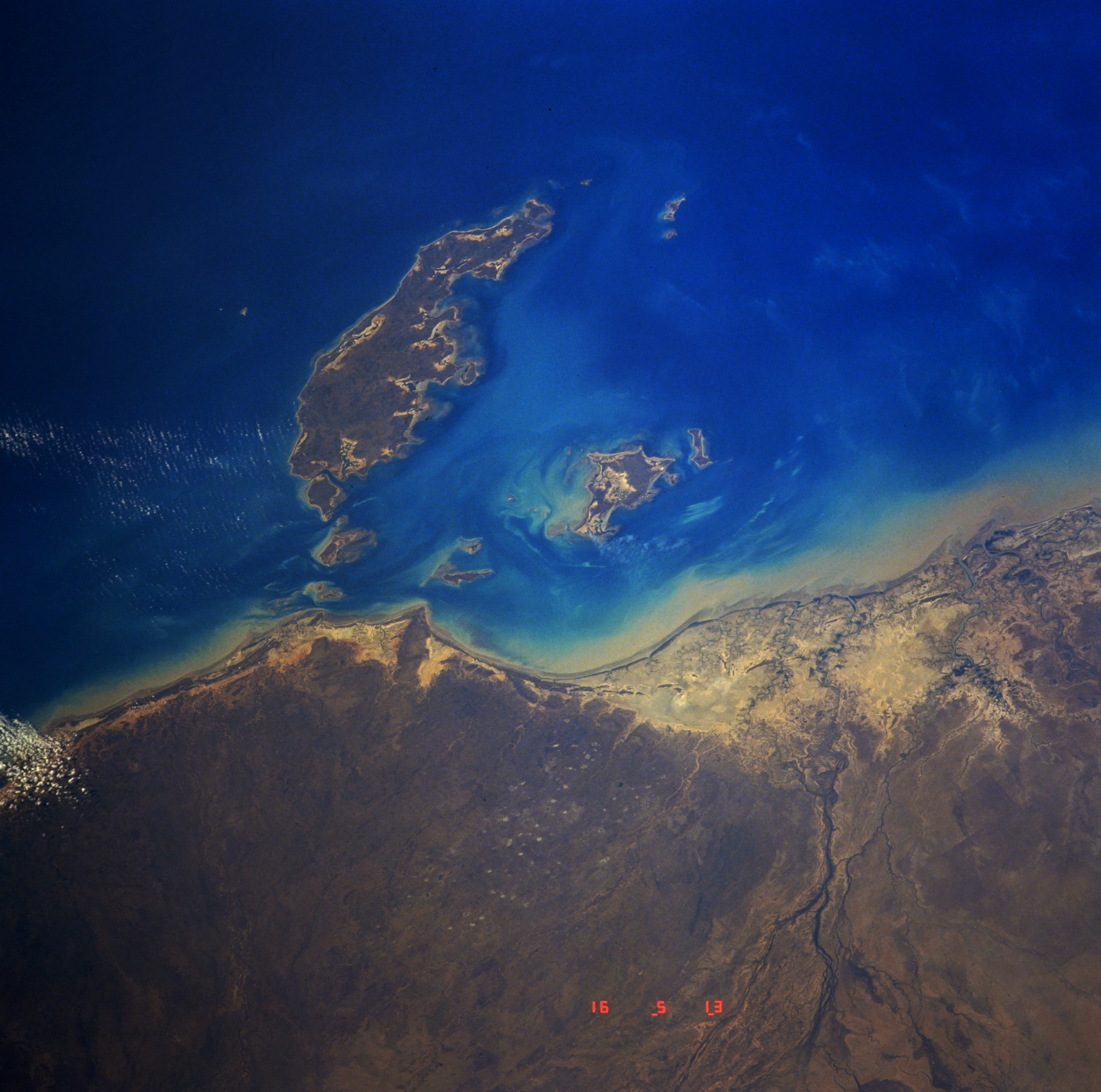
- Mornington Island from space, September 1991

- Location within Queensland

Geography
- Location: Gulf of Carpentaria
- Archipelago: Wellesley Islands
- Total islands: 22
- Area: 1,018 km^{2} (393 sq mi)
- Coastline: 302 km (187.7 mi)
- Highest elevation: 150 m (490 ft)
- Highest point: unnamed

Administration
- Australia
- State: Queensland
- Local Government Area: Shire of Mornington
- Largest settlement: Gununa

Demographics
- Population: 1007 (2001)
- Pop. density: 1/km^{2} (3/sq mi)
- Ethnic groups: Aboriginal Australians

Mornington Island, also known as Kunhanhaa, is an island in the Gulf of Carpentaria in the Shire of Mornington, Queensland, Australia. It is the northernmost and, at 1,018 km^{2} (393 sq mi), the largest of 22 islands that form the Wellesley Islands group. The largest town, Gununa, is in the south-western part of the island.

The Lardil people are the traditional owners of the island, but there are also Kaiadilt people, who were relocated from nearby Bentinck Island, as well as people of other nations on the island. The Mornington Island Mission operated from 1914 until 1978, when it was taken over by the Queensland Government, which had proclaimed the islands an Aboriginal reserve in 1905. The Mirndiyan Gununa Aboriginal Corporation owns and manages an art centre, MIArt, and dance troupe, the Mornington Island Dancers.

== Geography ==
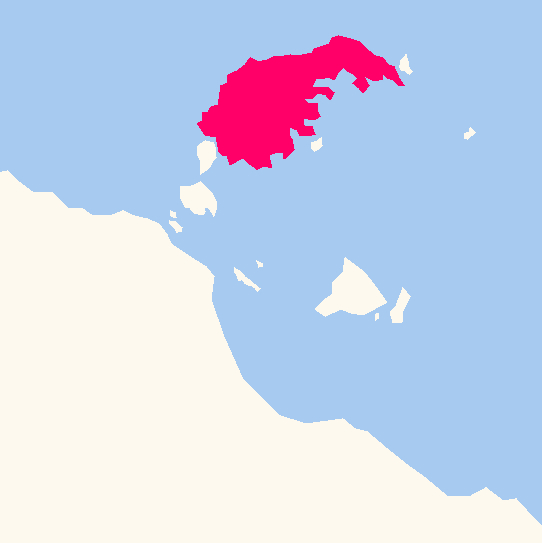
Mornington Island within the Wellesley Islands

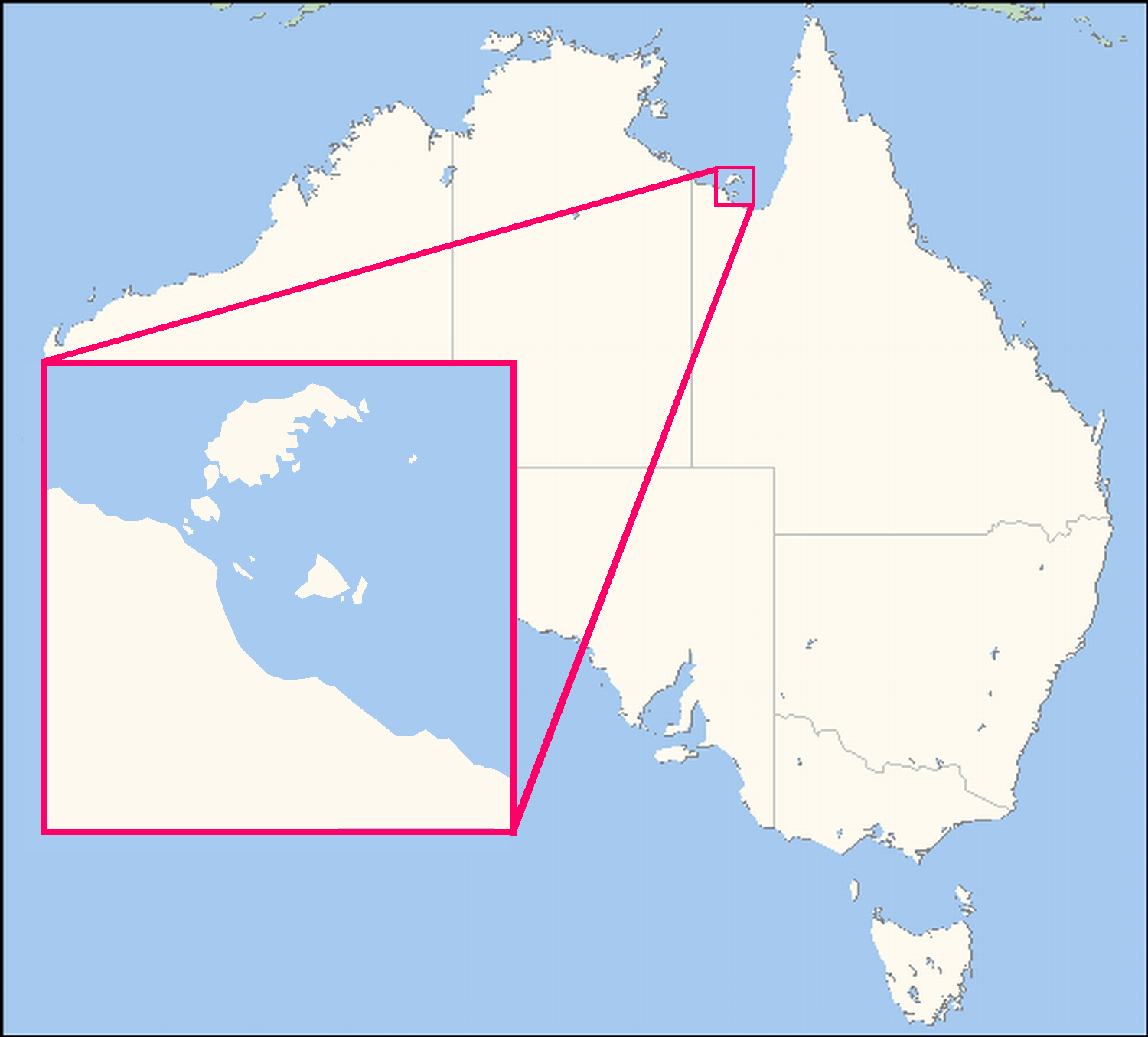
Location of Wellesley Islands in Australia

The general topography of the island, which lies on the eastern (Queensland) side of the Gulf of Carpentaria, is flat with the maximum elevation of 150 metres (490 ft). The island is fringed by mangrove forests and contains 10 estuaries, all in near pristine condition.

The Manowar and Rocky Islands Important Bird Area lies about 40 kilometres (25 mi) to the northwest of Mornington.

The town of Gununa is located on the south-western end of the island overlooking the Appel Channel (16.682°S 139.192°E) which separates it from Denham Island (16.7144°S 139.1597°E).

== History ==
Lardil (also known as Gununa, Ladil) is an Australian Aboriginal language spoken on Mornington Island and the Northern Wellesley Islands, within the local government boundaries of the Mornington Shire. Kuku-Thaypan (also known as Gugu Dhayban, Kuku Taipan, Thaypan) is an Australian Aboriginal language spoken in Hann River, Laura and Musgrave River and on Mornington Island, within the local government boundaries of the Cook Shire.

Lardil, who prefer to be known as Kunhanaamendaa (meaning people of Kunhanhaa), is the predominant nation on Mornington Island and they are the traditional owners of the land and surrounding seas. Kaiadilt people arrived more recently (1947–8) after being relocated from nearby Bentinck Island, and more people of other nations arrived from Doomadgee Mission in 1958.

In the 1600s, Macassan trepangers travelled thousands of kilometres from Sulawesi to Mornington Island and other Australian mainland destinations in search of sea cucumbers.

In 1644, the eastern cape of the island was named Cape Van Diemen by Abel Janszoon Tasman after Anthony van Diemen, the Governor-General of the Dutch East Indies.

Commander Matthew Flinders named the island after Richard Wellesley, 1st Marquess Wellesley who was known when younger as the Earl of Mornington. Wellesley had tried to have Flinders released from detention in Mauritius.

On 22 April 1905 all of the Wellesley islands apart from Sweers Island were proclaimed as an Aboriginal reserve, under a Protector of Aborigines appointed by the Queensland Government, Protector Howard. Bleakley was the next Protector, from 1913, but did not visit the island until 1916, by which time the first missionary (Hall) had arrived (see below for mission history).

Gununa Post Office opened by 1982.

During World War II, there was a radar station on Mornington Island.

The Mornington Island State School opened on 28 January 1975.

In 1978, the Queensland government decided to take over control of both the Aurukun and Mornington Island missions.

Cyclones routinely hit the island, including Cyclone May (February 1988), Cyclone Abigail (February 2001), Cyclone Bernie (January 2002), and Cyclone Fritz (February 2004).

=== Mornington Island Mission ===
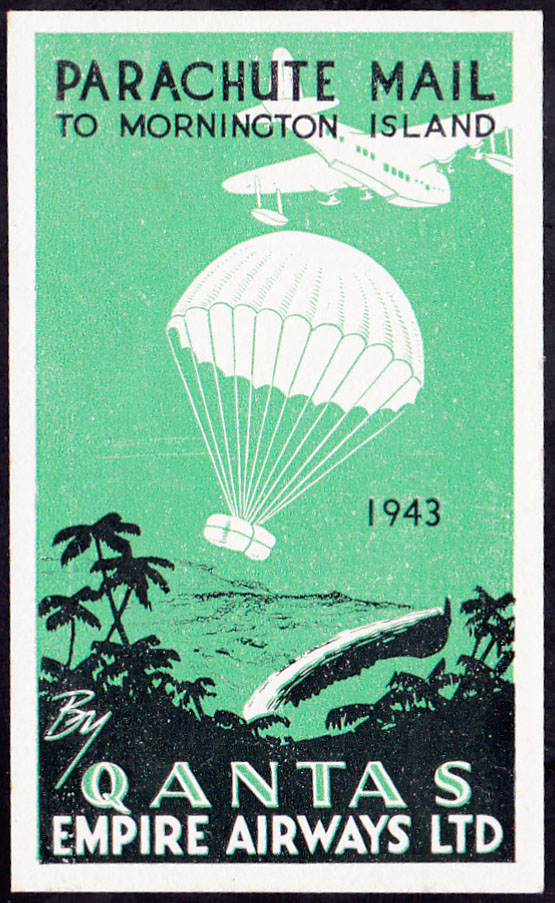
A vignette for affixing to mail for the 1943 Christmas parachute drop to Mornington Island Mission

The Mornington Island Mission was established in 1914 by Robert Hall, the Presbyterian assistant superintendent from Weipa Mission, who ran it until his murder in October 1917. There were also Moravian missionaries there.

Rev. Wilson took over, serving as superintendent until about 1941; mission staff were evacuated during the Second World War. James (Bert) McCarthy was Superintendent from 1944 to 1948, and he imposed a strict regime of adhering to Christian customs and eroded the authority of the elders. It was during this time that all of the Kaiadilt people living on nearby Bentinck Island were moved by the missionaries onto the Mornington Island Mission. The missionaries separated the children from their parents and placed them into separate dormitories for boys and girls, while their parents built humpies around the mission. It was ten years after the relocation, completed in 1948, before one of the removed Kaiadilt woman gave birth to a child who survived. The final relocation of the people was spurred by the pollution of the islanders' water supply by seawater after it was badly damaged by a cyclone, with the relocation assisted by the Queensland Government. It was reported that some of the people had to be "induced" to move. One of those relocated by the missionaries was artist Sally Gabori (c.1924–2015), who later mapped her traditional lands in her artwork at the Mornington Island Art Centre.

Douglas Belcher served as an assistant to McCarthy from 1946 until the end of 1947. He returned to the island as Superintendent after Taylor's departure in May 1953 and remained there until 1962. Belcher returned in 1964 and served again as Superintendent until 1972. He accepted the newly created role of Community Advisor to Gunnanamander Inc. in 1979, leaving in 1980. Belcher ran a more humane administration than his predecessors, and respected the Lardil culture.

Mission conditions were not as severe and restrictive as they were at the Doomadgee Mission, and by the late 1950s the practice of separating children from parents in dormitories had been abandoned, so many residents of Doomadgee moved to Mornington Island at this time.

In 1978 the Queensland Government took over the administration of both Aurukun and Mornington Island mission stations.

== Demographics ==
In the 2016 census, the population was 1,143 people. The majority of the islanders are Aboriginal. The majority of the people live in the township of Gununa.

In the 2021 census, the population was 1,025 people, the majority of whom (at least 80.2%) are Aboriginal or Torres Strait Islander people.

== Facilities ==
There has been a lack of infrastructure on the island. Before December 2023 there were around 30 rooms for visitors to the island. With a scheduled completion date of Christmas 2023, there is a new accommodation complex which includes another 34 rooms, and another 10 cabins added to the existing motel. The expansion will provide accommodation for tourists and enable medical staff and tradespeople to stay for longer periods of time on the island, with the added benefit of bringing in more revenue to the council. More social housing is also being built, along with a youth centre, an administration centre, and an Indigenous Knowledge Centre and library in the town of Gununa.

The council is funding most of the new construction, with some funding from the federal government's Growing Regions program and the state housing department, specifically for the visitor accommodation centre and duplexes.

== Mirndiyan Gununa Aboriginal Corporation ==
The Mirndiyan Gununa Aboriginal Corporation (MGAC) was founded as the Woomera Aboriginal Corporation in 1973, which was incorporated in 1983. It adopted its present name in 2009, at the same time establishing three discrete business units: MIDance, MIArt and MI Festival. The buildings were upgraded in 2010–11, including the addition of a dedicated studio for the artists.

== Art centre ==
Mornington Island Art (MIArt), owned and run by the Mirndiyan Gununa Aboriginal Corporation, is one of the oldest Indigenous Australian art centres in Australia.

People of the islands started making artefacts and bark paintings using natural ochres in the 1950s, later using acrylic paint on bark, and started selling their work in the 1970s. In the mid-1980s Mornington Island Art and Craft(s) (MIAAC) was established by Brett Evans, with a new building and a dedicated coordinator.

Some of the women from the Kaiadilt "old ladies' camp" established on Bentinck Island in the 1980s and 1990s, after moving to Mornington Island again in the 21st century, formed the Kaiadilt art movement, led by Sally Gabori (c.1924–2015). Evans established MIAAC to produce and market traditional crafts, including Gabori's fine weaving. The Kaiadilt community had no two-dimensional art traditions before 2005.

In 2002, Mornington Island Art and Craft became part of Woomera Aboriginal Corporation.

The art centre incorporates the MIArt studio and a gallery. The artists, both men and women, work in many different mediums and represent their Lardil and Kaiadilt cultures in their artwork, and exhibitions by the artists have been mounted in Brisbane and Darwin. Two of the most well-known artists to have worked in the art centre are Sally Gabori and Dick Roughsey, and members of their families continue to work at the centre. The manager of the art centre as of 2022 is John Armstrong, while the gallery manager is Bereline Loogatha.

The art centre works with Kaiadilt elders to help revive their language and culture.

== Mornington Island Dancers ==
There is also a significant history of performance on the island, and the Mornington Island Dancers was one of the earliest established Aboriginal performing arts groups in Australia. They performed publicly in Cairns in August 1964, and again in 1973 at the opening ceremony of the Sydney Opera House. Since 2009 and as of 2022 the dancers operate as a business unit of MGAC called MIDance.

The dancers celebrate Lardil culture through traditional dance and song. They have toured overseas many times, including in Italy, France, Germany, Luxembourg, the United States, United Kingdom, India and Sweden.

== Education ==
Mornington Island State School is a government primary and secondary (Early Childhood-10) school for boys and girls at Lardil Street (16.6663°S 139.1825°E). In 2018, the school had an enrolment of 263 students with 25 teachers and 14 non-teaching staff (11 full-time equivalent). It includes a special education program. The school works with the art centre and Kaiadilt elders to help revive their language and culture.

There are no schools offering education to Year 12 on the island, nor nearby. The alternatives are distance education and boarding school.

== In literature ==
Writer Ernestine Hill travelled to Mornington Island and a 1933 photograph she took of the island is held by the University of Queensland's library in their Ernestine Hill collection.

Mornington Island was the site of research over several decades by British anthropologist David McKnight and described in a series of books:

- People, Countries, and the Rainbow Serpent: Systems of classification among the Lardil of Mornington Island (1999)
- From Hunting to Drinking: The devastating effects of alcohol on an Australian Aboriginal community (2002)
- Going the Whiteman’s Way: Kinship and marriage among Australian Aborigines (2004)
- Of Marriage, Violence and Sorcery: The quest for power in northern Queensland (2005)

Windward Leeward by Douglas Belcher was published in 2024. This is an account of his and wife Doreen's time on Gununa (Mornington Island) and a historical record of the transition and decolonisation of the people of Gununa.

Indigenous art of Mornington Island is described in The Heart of Everything: The art and artists of Mornington & Bentinck Islands, ed. Nicholas Evans, Louise Martin-Chew and Paul Memmott (2008).

According to the Encyclopedia of Marine Mammals (2008), a group of Indigenous Mornington Island people has been communicating with wild Indo-Pacific bottlenose dolphins for millennia. It is said that they have "a medicine man who calls the dolphins and 'speaks' to them telepathically. By these communications he assures that the tribes' [sic] fortunes and happiness are maintained".

== Alcohol ban ==
In November 2003 the Government of Queensland implemented an Alcohol Management Plan to 19 Indigenous communities in Queensland where alcohol abuse was rampant, including Mornington Island. The plan restricted tavern opening hours, limits sales to only light and mid-strength beers, bans takeaway alcohol sales and home brewing. Riots broke out when the tough new alcohol laws were introduced. A total ban on alcohol was in place across all foreshores and the 23 islands in the Wellesley, South Wellesley Islands, Forsyth and Bountiful Islands groups and Sweers Island, apart from the Sweers Island Resort.

After the tavern was shut down, locals took to home brewing, and in 2017 Mornington Shire Council called for the ban to be lifted so that alcohol could be better regulated from a single legal outlet. Alcohol continued to be a major social and health problem as of 2019, and in 2021 the tavern was reopened, which had started to improve the community's relationship with alcohol.

On 16 April 2022, after much consultation with community elders, the island introduced limited, regulated access to liquor. Residents and visitors are now permitted to have up to 4.5 L (0.99 imp gal; 1.2 US gal), or 12 cans, of low or mid-strength beer or pre-mixed spirits for consumption in the home. The strategy has been adopted in order to address the problem of harms from people creating potent strength homebrews, as well as sly grogging.

== Climate ==
Mornington Island experiences a tropical savanna climate (Köppen: Aw), with a sweltering wet season from December to April, and a long dry season from May to November with cooler nights and lower humidity. Average daily maxima remain warm to hot year-round: from 25.8 °C (78.4 °F) in June and July to 33.3 °C (91.9 °F) in November. Average annual rainfall is 1,198.7 mm (47.19 in), and the highest daily rainfall recorded was 477.2 millimetres (18.79 in) on 1 March 2011. The island averages 110.6 clear days and 77.0 cloudy days annually. Extreme temperatures have ranged from 5.1 °C (41.2 °F) on 9 July 1974 to 39.8 °C (103.6 °F) on 6 December 2012.

Climate data for Mornington Island (16º39'36"S, 139º10'48"E, 9 m AMSL) (1972-2013 normals and extremes, rainfall to 1914)
Month	Jan	Feb	Mar	Apr	May	Jun	Jul	Aug	Sep	Oct	Nov	Dec	Year
Record high °C (°F)	38.3 (100.9)	37.6 (99.7)	37.7 (99.9)	37.3 (99.1)	34.9 (94.8)	33.6 (92.5)	32.2 (90.0)	34.5 (94.1)	38.0 (100.4)	38.7 (101.7)	39.0 (102.2)	39.8 (103.6)	39.8 (103.6)
Mean daily maximum °C (°F)	32.2 (90.0)	31.9 (89.4)	31.9 (89.4)	31.4 (88.5)	28.8 (83.8)	25.8 (78.4)	25.8 (78.4)	27.7 (81.9)	30.4 (86.7)	32.3 (90.1)	33.3 (91.9)	33.2 (91.8)	30.4 (86.7)
Mean daily minimum °C (°F)	25.5 (77.9)	25.4 (77.7)	24.6 (76.3)	23.2 (73.8)	20.2 (68.4)	17.1 (62.8)	16.2 (61.2)	17.2 (63.0)	20.5 (68.9)	23.6 (74.5)	25.7 (78.3)	26.2 (79.2)	22.1 (71.8)
Record low °C (°F)	19.5 (67.1)	20.0 (68.0)	19.0 (66.2)	12.8 (55.0)	5.5 (41.9)	7.0 (44.6)	5.1 (41.2)	7.2 (45.0)	11.5 (52.7)	12.6 (54.7)	18.5 (65.3)	20.0 (68.0)	5.1 (41.2)
Average precipitation mm (inches)	326.8 (12.87)	307.0 (12.09)	260.2 (10.24)	54.0 (2.13)	9.0 (0.35)	6.5 (0.26)	2.3 (0.09)	0.8 (0.03)	1.3 (0.05)	12.7 (0.50)	55.8 (2.20)	157.7 (6.21)	1,198.7 (47.19)
Average precipitation days (≥ 1.0 mm)	13.0	11.8	10.0	3.3	0.9	0.6	0.2	0.2	0.1	0.9	3.5	7.6	52.1
Average afternoon relative humidity (%)	72	74	67	60	58	55	53	49	49	53	58	65	59
Average dew point °C (°F)	24.3 (75.7)	24.5 (76.1)	23.0 (73.4)	21.1 (70.0)	18.2 (64.8)	14.5 (58.1)	13.8 (56.8)	14.2 (57.6)	16.1 (61.0)	19.1 (66.4)	21.5 (70.7)	23.6 (74.5)	19.5 (67.1)
Source: Bureau of Meteorology (1972-2013 normals and extremes, rainfall to 1914)

== Notable people ==
- Sally Gabori, artist
- Dick Roughsey, artist
- Charlie Cameron, Australian rules footballer with the Brisbane Lions
- Jarrod Cameron, former Australian rules footballer with the West Coast Eagles

== See also ==
- List of islands of Australia
- Sydney Island
