= Sydney Island (Queensland) =

Island off the coast of Mornington Island, Queensland, Australia

Coordinates: 16°41′S 139°28′E

Geography
- Location: Gulf of Carpentaria
- Archipelago: Wellesley Islands
- Major islands: Mornington Island
- Length: 5 km (3.1 mi)

Administration
- Australia
- State: Queensland

Sydney Island is situated in the Gulf of Carpentaria and is one if the islands of the Wellesley Islands group. It is about 5 kilometres (3.1 mi) long and just to the south of the major island in the group Mornington Island.

== See also ==
- List of islands of Australia
