= Sweers Island =

Island in Queensland, Australia

Coordinates: 17.101131°S 139.619398°E

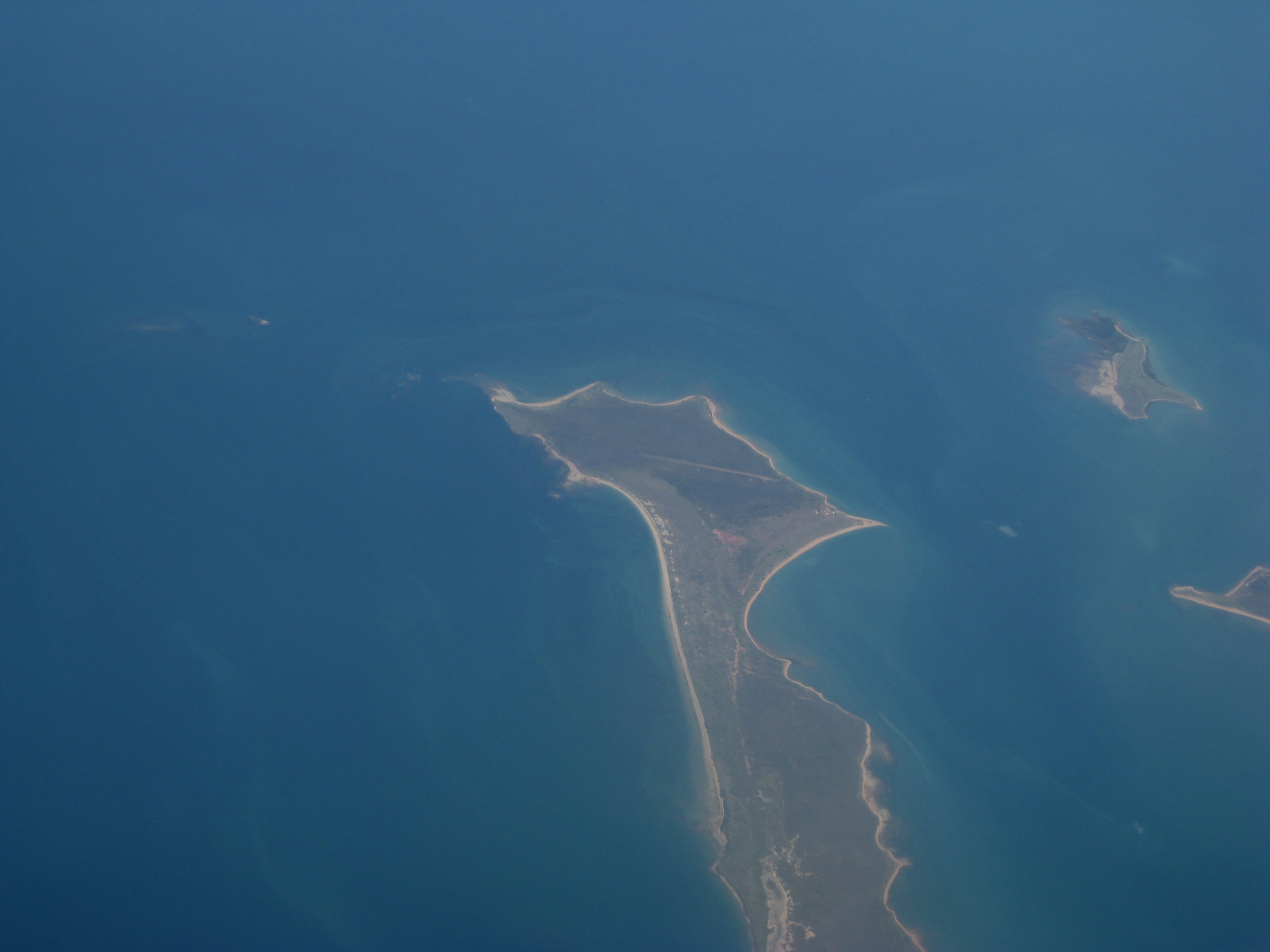
Aerial view of the southern end of Sweers Island, 2009

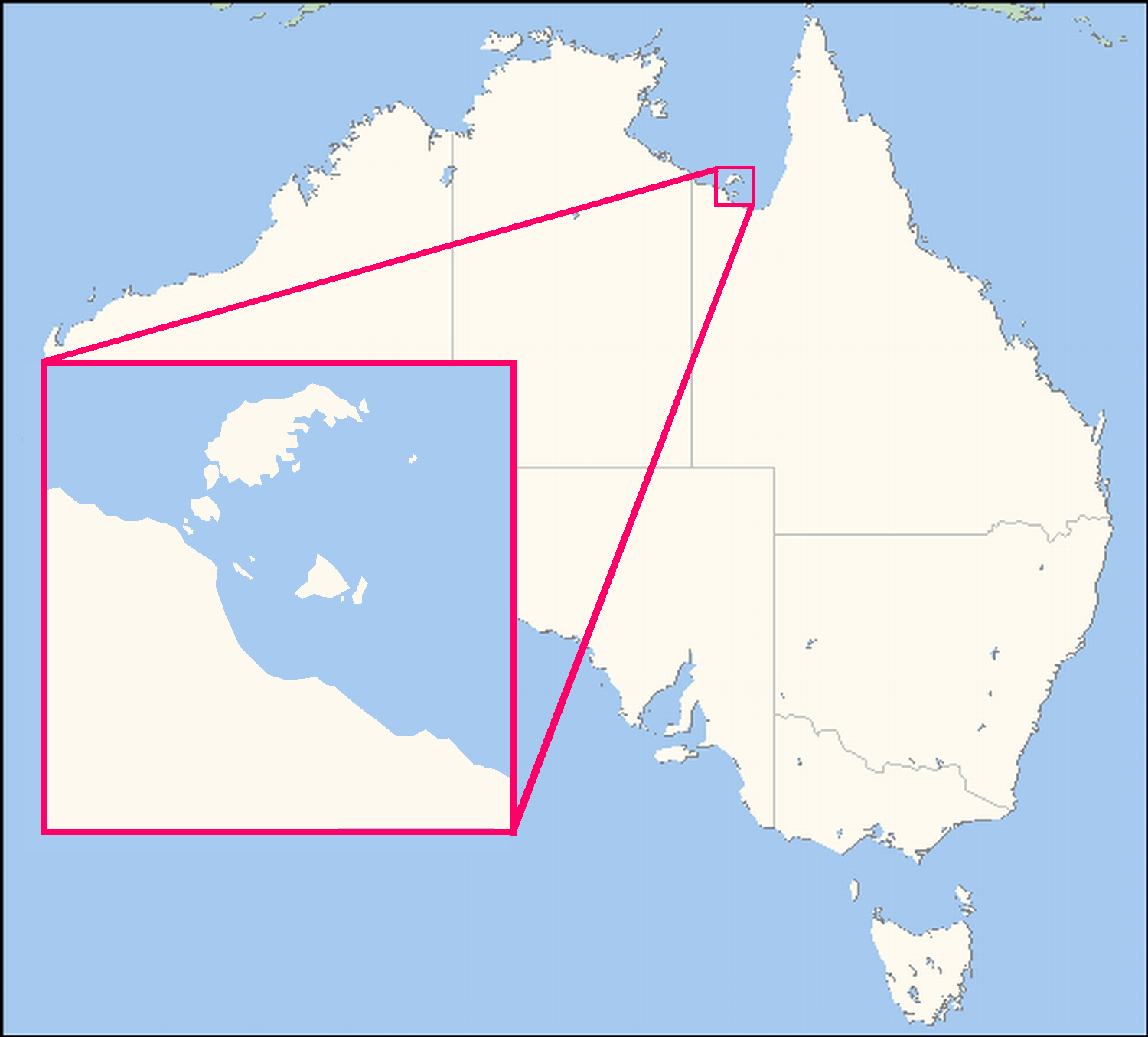
Wellesley Islands

Sweers Island is an island in the South Wellesley Islands in the Gulf of Carpentaria, Queensland, Australia. Most of the island is Aboriginal Freehold Land, held in trust by the Kaiadilt Aboriginal Land Trust (KALT) on behalf of the traditional owners. There is a small private resort, Sweers Island Resort owned via a perpetual lease on Crown Land, being the site of a township dating from the 1800s, with the only residents being the owners and workers at the resort.

Sweers Island was the location of "The Investigator Tree" which is now in Queensland Museum.

== History ==
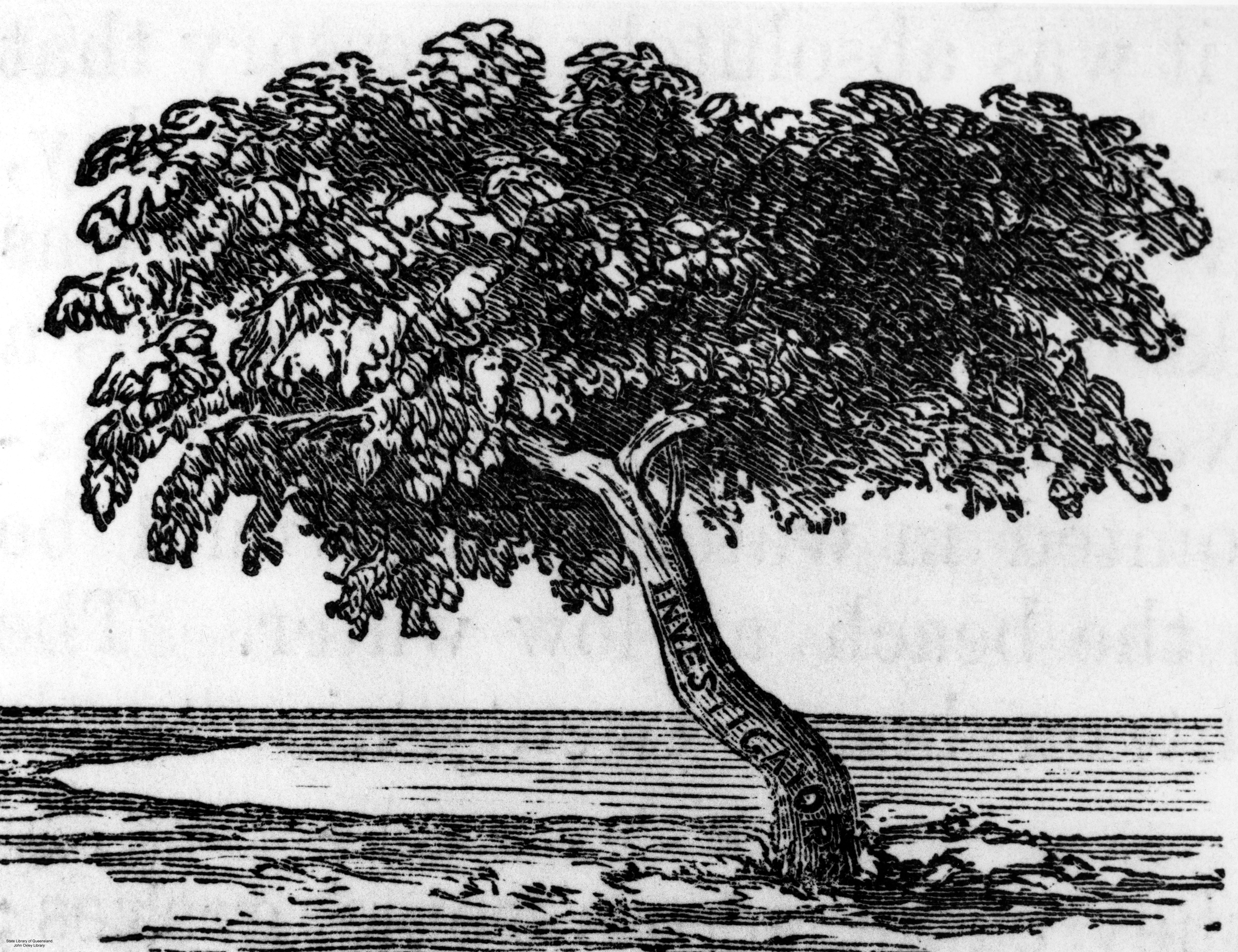
Drawing of the Investigator tree, 1857

Kayardild (also known as Kaiadilt and Gayadilta) is a language of the Gulf of Carpentaria, once spoken by the Kaiadilt people. The Kayardild language region includes the landscape within the local government boundaries of the Mornington Shire Council.

The island was given its European name by explorer Matthew Flinders on 16 November 1802 after Salomon Sweers, a council member of the East India Company at Batavia who was one of those who instructed Abel Tasman to explore the Gulf of Carpentaria in 1644. Flinders was circumnavigating the Australian continent in the sloop HMS Investigator to map the coastline and establish if Australia was a single island or whether there were two or more islands (the Gulf of Carpentaria and the Great Australian Bight were suspected to be the entrances to straits between the islands).

Robert Towns established Burketown in 1865 as a base for his extensive holdings in the Gulf Country. Burketown's development was limited due to the extent of tropical diseases suffered by its inhabitants. When the ship Margaret and Mary arrived in Burketown from Sydney carrying a fever (possibly malaria), the majority of those on board died at Burketown. In the belief that Burketown was inherently unhealthy, William Landsborough evacuated most of the survivors to Sweers Island for 18 months, with only a further two people dying. Towns and Co then traded wool, tallow, hides and skins between Sweers Island and Batavia in October 1868.

Thomas ("Tex") and Lyn Battle, along with Ray and Salme Atherinos, established a low-key fishing lodge on the island in 1987.

=== The Investigator Tree ===
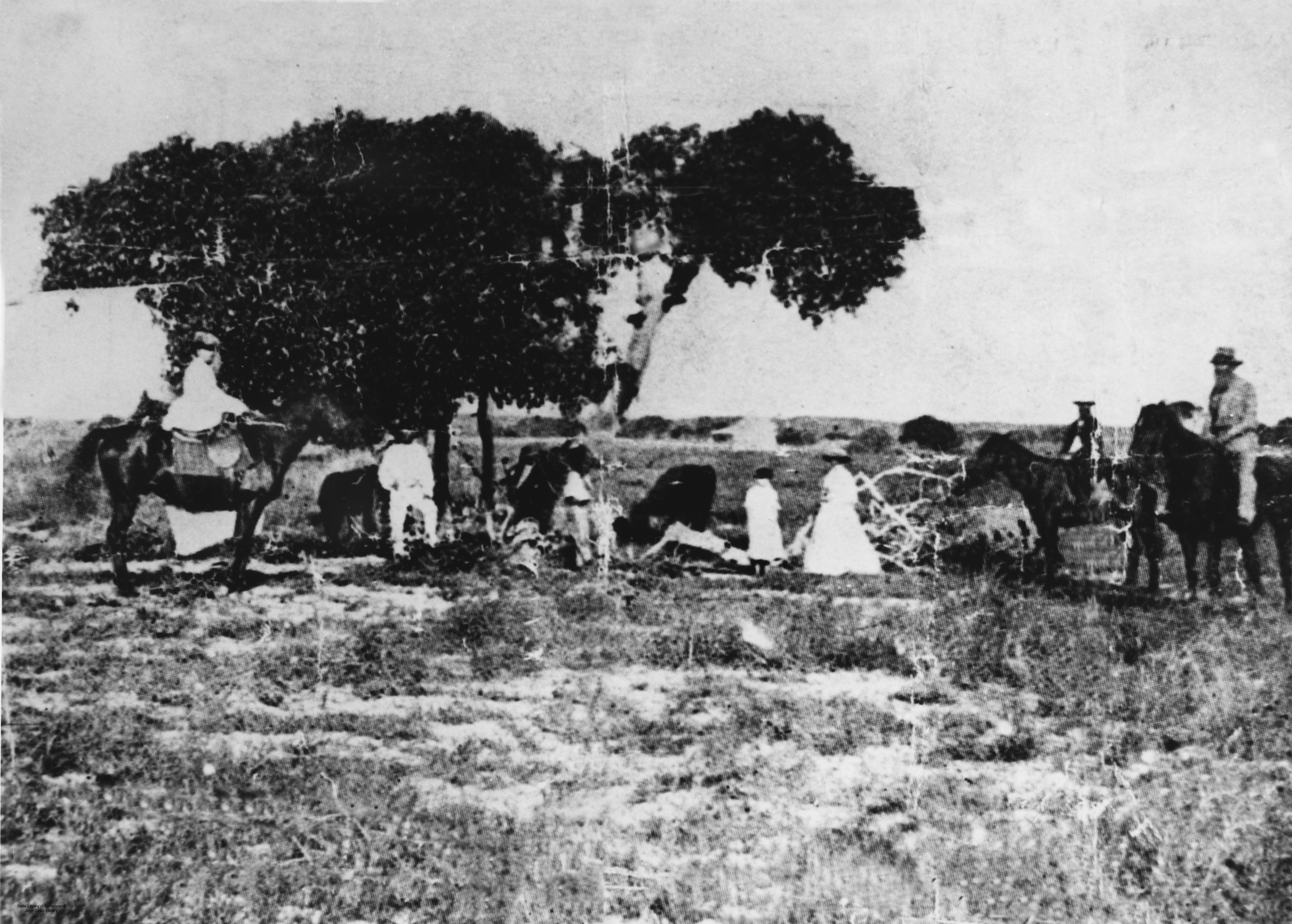
The Investigator Tree, 1871

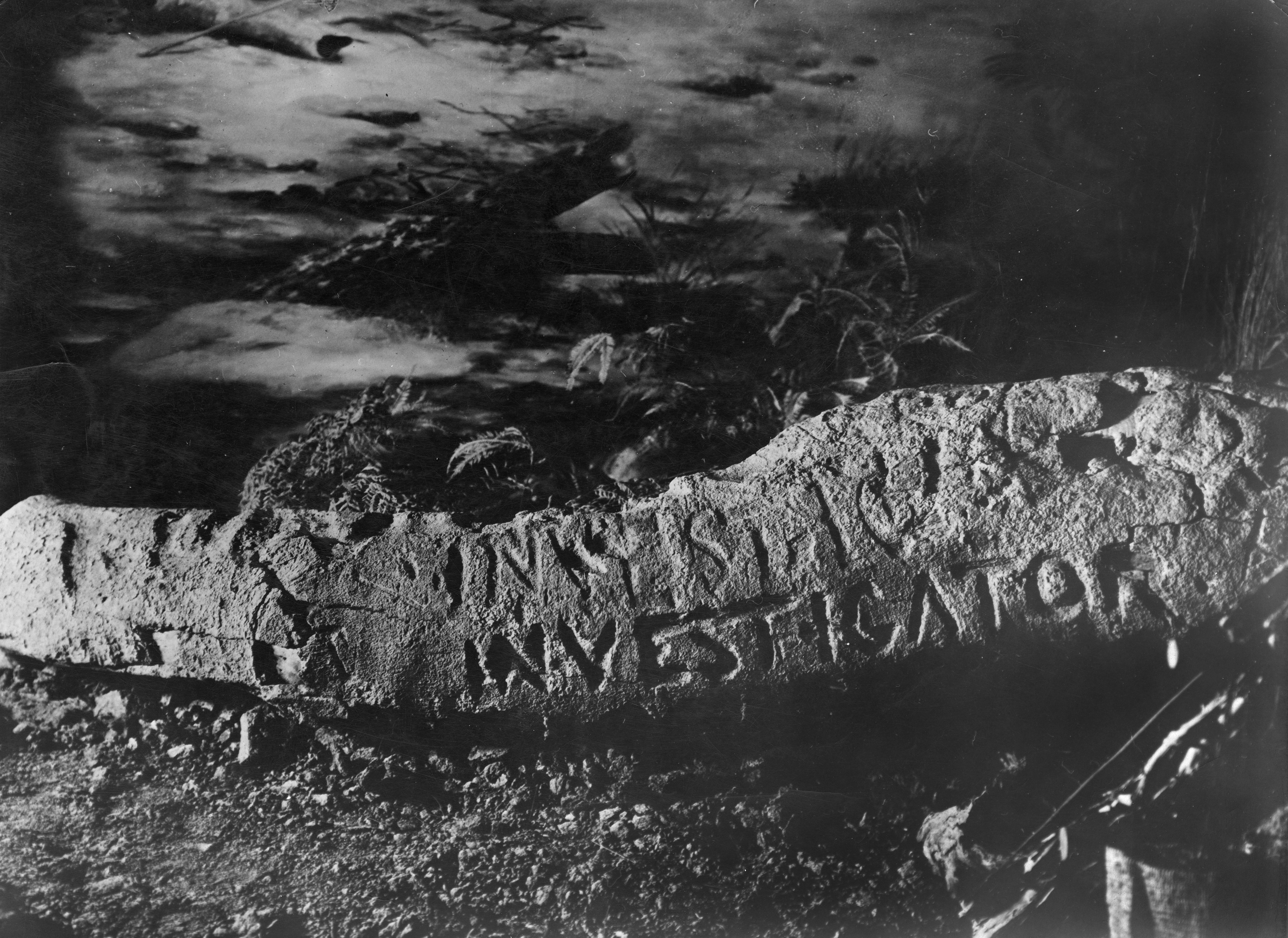
Investigator tree at Queensland Museum (formerly at Sweers Island)

In 1841, the island was visited by John Lort Stokes, commander of the Beagle on an exploration of northern Australia. Stokes discovered a tree (Celtis paniculata) on the western part of the island with the word "Investigator" carved into it by Flinders on his 1802 visit, giving the tree the name "The Investigator Tree". Stokes also carved the name "Beagle" on the tree. Subsequent visitors to the island also carved names, including from Augustus Charles Gregory's expedition in 1856 and Landsborough's search for the Burke and Wills expedition in 1861. A cyclone on 5 March 1887 severely damaged the tree, so part of the trunk was removed to the Queensland Museum in 1889.

== Geography and governance ==
Sweers Island is approximately 8 km (5.0 mi) long. It is located 3 kilometres (1.9 mi) east of Bentinck Island (the largest island in the South Wellesley Islands) and 70 kilometres (43 mi) north from Burketown on the Queensland mainland.

The island lies within the Shire of Mornington.

=== Climate ===
Sweers Island has a tropical savanna climate (Köppen: Aw), with a sultry wet season from November to March, and a long dry season from April to October, with cooler temperatures. Average daily maxima remain warm to hot year-round: from 25.5 °C (77.9 °F) in July to 33.6 °C (92.5 °F) in December. Average annual rainfall is 1,202.8 mm (47.35 in), and the highest daily rainfall recorded was 251.0 millimetres (9.88 in) on 1 March 2011. Extreme temperatures have ranged from 9.1 °C (48.4 °F) on 1 July 2002 to 39.5 °C (103.1 °F) on 6 December 2012.

Climate data for Sweer Island (17º06'36"S, 139º36'00"E, 4 m AMSL) (2001-2024 normals and extremes, rainfall to 1893)
| Month | Jan | Feb | Mar | Apr | May | Jun | Jul | Aug | Sep | Oct | Nov | Dec | Year |
|---|---|---|---|---|---|---|---|---|---|---|---|---|---|
| Record high °C (°F) | 39.0 (102.2) | 38.1 (100.6) | 37.9 (100.2) | 36.0 (96.8) | 33.7 (92.7) | 32.0 (89.6) | 30.7 (87.3) | 32.8 (91.0) | 35.8 (96.4) | 38.5 (101.3) | 39.2 (102.6) | 39.5 (103.1) | 39.5 (103.1) |
| Mean daily maximum °C (°F) | 32.5 (90.5) | 32.4 (90.3) | 32.3 (90.1) | 31.5 (88.7) | 28.6 (83.5) | 26.0 (78.8) | 25.5 (77.9) | 27.9 (82.2) | 29.6 (85.3) | 32.0 (89.6) | 33.2 (91.8) | 33.6 (92.5) | 30.4 (86.8) |
| Mean daily minimum °C (°F) | 26.5 (79.7) | 26.3 (79.3) | 26.2 (79.2) | 25.0 (77.0) | 21.8 (71.2) | 18.8 (65.8) | 17.9 (64.2) | 18.9 (66.0) | 22.1 (71.8) | 25.1 (77.2) | 26.6 (79.9) | 27.1 (80.8) | 23.5 (74.3) |
| Record low °C (°F) | 17.5 (63.5) | 20.6 (69.1) | 19.5 (67.1) | 17.3 (63.1) | 12.9 (55.2) | 11.2 (52.2) | 9.1 (48.4) | 10.7 (51.3) | 14.0 (57.2) | 18.9 (66.0) | 18.0 (64.4) | 21.5 (70.7) | 9.1 (48.4) |
| Average precipitation mm (inches) | 335.8 (13.22) | 342.0 (13.46) | 228.0 (8.98) | 48.3 (1.90) | 5.9 (0.23) | 3.9 (0.15) | 3.1 (0.12) | 1.5 (0.06) | 4.3 (0.17) | 10.3 (0.41) | 69.6 (2.74) | 146.0 (5.75) | 1,202.8 (47.35) |
| Average precipitation days (≥ 1.0 mm) | 11.3 | 11.0 | 8.3 | 2.5 | 0.6 | 0.4 | 0.4 | 0.2 | 0.2 | 0.8 | 3.5 | 7.1 | 46.3 |
Source: Bureau of Meteorology (2001-2024 normals and extremes, rainfall to 1893)

== Recreation ==
Recreational activities on Sweers Island include fishing and watching wildlife. Sweetlip is the most common table fish caught off the island, while other fish species include: coral trout, red emperor, golden snapper, nannygai and parrot fish. In winter fish species including Spanish mackerel, grey mackerel, giant trevally, giant leatherskin, queenfish, northern bluefin tuna, and cobia can be caught.

Fishing experiences including accommodation, meals and boat hire are available at Sweers Island Resort.

== Transport ==
The island has a 1,100 metres (3,600 ft) all-weather gravel airstrip, owned by Sweers Island Resort.

== See also ==
- List of islands of Australia
