= Garrwa people =

Aboriginal Australian people

The Garrwa people, also spelt Karawa and Garawa, are an Aboriginal Australian people living in the Northern Territory, whose traditional lands extended from east of the McArthur River at Borroloola to Doomadgee and the Nicholson River in Queensland.

== Language ==
Together with the Waanyi language, Garrwa belongs to the Garrwan language family, and had two dialects: the heavy eastern Guninderri and the light western variety of Garrwa. Its status within the larger Pama-Nyungan family is disputed: though it shares some features, it also displays many innovative forms that are rare in other Australian languages, suggesting that it fits a distinctive typology.

== Country ==
Tindale calculated the extent of Garrwa lands at approximately 6,300 square miles (16,000 km^{2}). They were in his view an inland people whose northern extension ran only as far as roughly the margins of the coastal plain some 40 miles (64 km) from the Gulf of Carpentaria's coastline. Their territory was rocky, crossing the plateau from the Robinson River homestead and the Foelsche River, running as far south as the headwaters of the former and Seigalls Creek Homestead. Their eastern flank went beyond Calvert Hills as far as east to Wollogorang close to the Queensland border and to the Westmoreland outstation.

Maps have the Yanyuwa people to the north of the Garrwa, the Waanyi and Gudanji to their south, and the Yukulta / Ganggalidda to their east. Today the Garrwa people consider themselves related to the area along the Gulf of Carpentaria coastline of Queensland, around the Wearyan and Robinson Rivers. Two other groups, the Binbinga and Wilangarra became extinct soon after the beginning of white colonisation. The Garrwa habitat extended from the northern tropical, with its mangroves to southern semi-arid inland, with its sandstone gorges. According to the seasons, they would venture into the Bukalara (Barkly Tableland). They see themselves as a freshwater people, distinct from the saltwater peoples to the north and east, harvesting food available in the riverine ecosystem – crayfish, turtles, tubers and waterlilies – along with land game such as kangaroo, echidnas and possums.

Drawing on a paraphrase by the historian Tony Roberts, the leading modern authority on the Garrwa Ilana Mushin identifies as part of Garrwa lands the area described in the journal kept by Ludwig Leichhardt as he travelled an old aboriginal trade route through the southern coastal area, as that is. The area concerned, now called the Port McArthur Tidal Wetlands System, lay around the Robinson and Wearyan rivers, and Leichhardt

described emu traps around waterholes, fish traps and fishing weirs across rivers, well-used footpaths, major living areas with substantial dwellings, wells of clear water and a sophisticated method of detoxifying the otherwise extremely poisonous cycad nuts. There were moderately high concentrations of people leading an industrious lifestyle. All of this was markedly different to the stereotyped images of 'savages' leading a 'nomadic' and 'primitive' existence.'

The Garrwa now co-manage the Ganalanga-Mindibirrina Indigenous Protected Area, formed in 2015 through the Waanyi Garawa and Garawa Ranger groups.

== Social organization ==
The Garrwa were divided into clans, the name of which one at least is known.

- Wulungwara (a clan around Wollongorang)

== History of contact ==
With the onset of white colonization, the Garrwa are known to have moved up to the coast as far as Tully Inlet, and there they began to mix with the Yanyuwa.

In 1916 copper was discovered in the area of Redbank in Garrwa territory and thereafter the Redbank Copper Mine was established. The pollution from the overflow of its washed ores has turned the nearby Hanrahan's Creek toxic and seeped over as far as the Wentworth Aggregation wetland, Wollogorang Station and affected sacred aboriginal sites such as Moonlight Falls.

== Trading ==
Much prized kulunja knife blades of the leilira type were fashioned from quartzite mined at a site 6 miles south of the modern Redbanks Copper Mine, and used as articles of trade by the Garrwa. One particular use for them was as barter to obtain young wives from the Lardil of Mornington Island. An early survey of blood types suggested that the Garrwa had a high B phenotype ratio, a characteristic almost non-existent among Australian Aboriginal people, shared only by the Kaiadilt and Tagalag. The Garrwa were considered to be the main source for the B gene in surrounding continental populations.

== Alternative names ==
- Karawa
- Karrawar
- Garawa
- Kurrawar
- Korrawa
- Grawa
- Leearawa
- Kariwa
- Wulungwara
- Wollongorang (toponym)

== Sources ==
- Basedow, Herbert (1907). "Anthropological notes on the Western Coastal tribes of the Northern Territory of South Australia". Transactions of the Royal Society of South Australia. 31. Adelaide: 1–62.
- Mathews, R. H. (July 1899). "Native tribes of Queensland". American Anthropologist. 1 (3): 595–597. JSTOR 658830.
- Mathews, R. H. (July–September 1900). "The Wombya Organization of the Australian Aborigines". American Anthropologist. 2 (3). Adelaide: 494–501. doi:10.1525/aa.1900.2.3.02a00050. JSTOR 658964.
- Mushin, Ilana (2013). A Grammar of (Western) Garrwa. Walter de Gruyter. ISBN 978-1-614-51241-7.
- Redbank mine. NT Department of Mines and Energy. 27 March 2018.
- Roberts, Tony (2005). Frontier Justice: A History of the Gulf Country to 1900. University of Queensland Press. ISBN 978-0-702-24083-6.
- Roberts, Tony (November 2009). "The brutal truth: What happened in the gulf country". The Monthly.
- Simmons, R. T.; Graydon, J. J.; Tindale, Norman (September 1964). "Further Blood Group Genetical Studies on Australian Aborigines of Bentinck, Mornington and Forsyth Islands and the Mainland, Gulf of Carpentaria, Together with Frequencies for Natives of the Western Desert, Western Australia". Oceania. 35 (1): 66–80. doi:10.1002/j.1834-4461.1964.tb00829.x. JSTOR 40329459.
- Spencer, Baldwin (1914). Native tribes of the Northern Territory of Australia (PDF). London: Macmillan Publishers.
- Spencer, Sir Baldwin; Gillen, Francis J. (1899). Native tribes of Central Australia (PDF). Macmillan Publishers.
- Stretton, W. G. (1893). "Customs, rites and superstitions of the aboriginal tribes of the Gulf of Carpentaria" (PDF). Journal of the Royal Geographical Society of Australia (Adelaide Branch). 17: 227–253. Archived from the original (PDF) on 21 January 2018.
- Tindale, Norman Barnett (1974). "Karawa (NT)". Aboriginal Tribes of Australia: Their Terrain, Environmental Controls, Distribution, Limits, and Proper Names. Australian National University. ISBN 978-0-708-10741-6. Archived from the original on 20 March 2020.
- Toohey, Paul (15 March 2013). "How the Redbank copper mine poisoned Hanrahan's Creek". Northern Territory News.
- Trigger, David (2015). "Change and Succession in Aboriginal Claims to Land". In Toner, P.G. (ed.). Strings of Connectedness: Essays in honour of Ian Keen. Australian National University Press. pp. 53–73. ISBN 978-1-925-02263-6.
- Yallop, C. L. (1969). "The Aljawara and Their Territory". Oceania. 39 (3): 187–197. doi:10.1002/j.1834-4461.1969.tb01005.x. JSTOR 40329775.
