= Manankurra =

Manankurra, traditionally transcribed in English ethnographic texts as Manangoora, is the name of an area 60 kilometres east of Borroloola in the Northern Territory of Australia which is of great importance for the Yanyuwa people and Garrwa and of many other indigenous Australian people in the south-west of the Gulf of Carpentaria. It is now sited within a pastoral lease.

== Ecology ==
Manankurra stands on the eastern bank of a bend in the Wearyan River. It is called a wirrimalaru (big place), thickly planted with a variety of white-barked eucalyptus, and with an Australian species of cycad palm trees, which had an important ritual function in indigenous lifestyle and cultural beliefs.

== Ritual function ==
The Yanyuwa and Garrwa tribes would gather at Manankurra to perform ceremonies connected with a creation myth, whose dreamtime centre concerned the figure of the tiger shark, around whom a songline cycle (kujika) was chanted.

== European settlement ==
European settlement began in 1918, with the establishment of a salt-production plant on the site, and continued until its closure in 1941. The factory was a source of income for many aborigines who were attracted to the area for seasonal employment after their dispersal from their native grounds, and a large Yanyuwa camp was established nearby, at Liwurriya for that reason. In 1964 the area inclusive of Manankurra was enveloped within a pastoral lease. The Yanyuwa and Garrwa peoples claimed a special entitlement to the old ritual ground, which they desired to be excised from the lease to enable them to restore their management of the ceremonial landscape, a claim they underwrote by a journey, which was the subject of a film, Buwarrala Akarriya, (Journey East) which took place from Borroloola to Manankarra in 1988. It was an opportunity also to inculcate in young initiates, rdaru, the experience of the traditional movement through the ritual landscape of earlier times.

== Notes ==
=== Sources ===
- Bradley, John J. (1988). "Yanyuwa: 'Men speak one way, women speak another'" (PDF). 1. Aboriginal Linguistics: 126–134.
- Bradley, John J.; Kearney, Amanda (2009). "Manankurra:What's in a name? Placenames and emotional geographies". In Hercus, Luise; Koch, Harold (eds.). Aboriginal Placenames: Naming and Re-Naming the Australian Landscape. Australian National University. pp. 463–479. ISBN 978-1-921-66609-4.
- Roberts, Tony (2005). Frontier Justice: A History of the Gulf Country to 1900. University of Queensland Press. ISBN 978-0-702-24083-6.
