= Gunindiri =

Indigenous people in Australia

The Gunindiri are an indigenous Australian people of the Northern Territory.

== Language ==
Gunindiri is classified as one of the Garawan languages.

== Country ==
According to Norman Tindale, the Gunindiri had some 5,500 square miles (14,000 km^{2}) of territory on the Barkly Tableland, along the headwaters of the Calvert, Robinson and Nicholson rivers. Their southwestern extension was at Anthony Lagoon. Cresswell Downs was on Gunindiri land as was Fish Waterhole.

== Alternative names ==
- Goonanderry
- Leecundundeerie
- Cundundeerie
- Kunandra

== Sources ==
- Basedow, Herbert (1907). "Anthropological notes on the Western Coastal tribes of the Northern Territory of South Australia". Journal of the Transactions of the Royal Society of South Australia. 31: 1–62.
- Stretton, W. G. (1893). "Customs, rites and superstitions of the aboriginal tribes of the Gulf of Carpentaria" (PDF). Journal of the Royal Geographical Society of Australia (Adelaide Branch). 17: 227–253. Archived from the original (PDF) on 21 January 2018.
- Tindale, Norman Barnett (1974). "Kunindiri (NT)". Aboriginal Tribes of Australia: Their Terrain, Environmental Controls, Distribution, Limits, and Proper Names. Australian National University. ISBN 978-0-708-10741-6. Archived from the original on 22 January 2018.
