= Wollogorang =

Wollogorang may refer to:

- Wollogorang, New South Wales, a locality
- Wollogorang Station, Northern Territory
- Wollogorang Important Bird Area, within Wollogorang Station
- Settlement Creek, known in the local Ganggalida indigenous language as Wollogorang
