= Garrwa =

Garrwa or Garawa may be,

- Garrwa people
- Garrwa language
