= William Shadforth =

Australian Aboriginal pastoralist (1912–2000)

William Shadforth, often known as Willie Shadforth (2 March 1912 – 7 December 2000) was a Garrwa man who became one of the first Aboriginal people to own a cattle station in 1953 when he purchased Seven Emu Station in the Northern Territory of Australia.

== Biography ==
Shadforth was born on Wollogerang Station and he worked there until he was fired following an incident where he hit someone over the head; he would later say this was the best thing to ever happen to him. After losing his job he went to Charters Towers and stayed there for 6 years. He then became a drover and horse trader who brought mobs of cattle and horses between Queensland, South Australia, Western Australia and the Northern Territory.

When passing through Alice Springs in 1953, while driving horses between Elsey and Mount Dare Stations, he won money on a bet on the horse My Hero for the Caulfield Cup and soon after doubled his money betting on Wodalla to win the Melbourne Cup - the odds were 14 to 1. He was known to be a fine judge of horses and this contributed to him making these winnings.

Shadforth then used his profits of £10,000 to purchase Seven Emu Station, nearby to Borroloola, from his friend George Butcher.

Shadforth's son, Frank Shadforth, who later took over the ownership and management of the station, said of his father:

Dad never went to school but he knew English and Garawa. He knew the ceremonies and law, and how things worked. He ran his business in a European way, but mixed with both cultures. How he held on to his traditions I don’t know.

— Frank Shadforth, Outback Magazine, April-May 2020

After purchasing the station Shadforth worked there alongside his family and had 10 children; Frank, who inherited the property, is his 7th son. He continued to drove cattle and would also take work shooting horses for hair to make saddles on, nearby Brunette Downs Station and as take work as a cook around Katherine and Darwin.

In his later years he lived at Borroloola, and he died at the Katherine Hospital on 7 December 2000. He is buried in the Borroloola Cemetery.

The station remains Indigenous-owned and run by members of the Shadforth family.

== Resources about Shadforth ==
Many resources credited to Shadforth are held by AIATSIS including an oral history account, traditional stories and songs recorded by him.
