= Yanyuwa people =

Aboriginal Australian people of the Northern Territory

The Yanyuwa people, also spelt Yanuwa, Yanyula and other variations, are an Aboriginal Australian people of the Northern Territory who live in the coastal region inclusive of and opposite to the Sir Edward Pellew Group of Islands in the southern Gulf of Carpentaria. They self-identify as a saltwater people. (Note: 'Bradley details Yanyuwa people's recognition of themselves as people of the sea, and argues for a Yanyuwa sense of identity, called Yanyuwangala, which he translates as the awareness of being a saltwater Yanyuwa person.')

== Country ==
In Norman Tindale's estimation, the Yanyuwa had roughly 16,000 km^{2} (6,300 mi^{2}) of tribal lands, encompassing the McArthur River from near Borroloola as far as the coast, and running southeast along the coast to the other sided of Tully Inlet. They were also present at Pungalina. Offshore, perhaps excluding Vanderlin Island though contemporary Yanyuwa insist they were Indigenous also to that area, they also lived and fished on the Sir Edward Pellew Islands.

The Yanyuwa lived east of the Wilingura. On their southern flank were the Binbinga people. In the Yanyuwa language there are some 1,500 placenames marking out the distinctive features of the territory they once inhabited.

== History ==
The Yanyuwa traded with the trepangers from the port of Makassar in Sulawesi, who had begun to explore the area of the Gulf of Carpentaria since the 1720s. The trade cycle was based on sailing south with the north westerlies that began to blow in December and then returning under the south easterlies blowing up from April. Trade relations with the Sulawesi were excellent. Yanyuwa people are known to have sailed back on the Sulawesi fleet of praus to stay over for months at Makasser. They, like many other Gulf peoples, adopted Makaser as a lingua franca, whose vocabulary left traces in many of the Aboriginal gulf languages.

== Language ==
The Yanyuwa language has been classified as one of the Ngarna languages of the larger Pama–Nyungan language family.

Many Yanyuwa have also been bilingual in the Garrwa language. The retention of their language as with Garrwa has been attributed to the relative disinterest of colonising whites in the lands both of these tribes traditionally inhabited. Taking as his starting point an observation by Edward Sapir concerning the Yahi dialect of Yana, who considered the gendered distinction in language use between Yanna men and women as very rare, or not as pervasive as in this dialect, John Bradley showed that in Yanyuwa, the differentiation was at least as structurally thorough as in Yahi. The gendered linguistic difference between liyi-wulu-wu (speech for men) and liyi nhanawaya-wu (speech for women) affected noun classes, verbs and pronouns, and in their creation stories, this distinction was maintained by male and female spirits. Raised predominantly by the women, boys spoke the women's dialect until initiation, whereupon they were obliged by custom not to speak as if they had breasts and vaginas.

Neighbouring peoples, speakers of Marra, Garrwa and Gurdanji consider Yanyuwa difficult precisely for this gendered difference in grammar, whereas the Yanyuwa, conversely, have no difficulty in mastering the latter languages. Two exceptions exist, in ribald talk, and in certain songline cycles where male figures use female speech, though the reason is not known. Bradley's conclusion is:

The reasons as to why two distinct dialects for female and male speakers developed are lost in time., This feature has however served to make Yanyuwa a language unique within Aboriginal Australia, if not the world.

== Social structure ==
Yanyuwa law divides generations in the following sequence: the li-ambirrijingu (those in front) are the ancestors, fully-fledged in the intricacies of being Yanyuwa. The li-wumbijingu (those in the middle) are constituted by the present generation of elders. Thirdly, there are the li-ngulakaringu (those behind), the young, including those yet to be born.

== Alternative names ==
- Yanula
- Yanular
- Anjula
- Anyula
- Anyoola
- Anyuwa
- Janjula
- Aniula
- Anula
- Anuwa
- Leanawa
- Leeanuwa
- Unalla
- Djirukurumbant (directional exonym given them by eastern tribes)
- Njangga (eastern name for the Yanyuwa)
- Njangkala
- Yangala
- Iangkala
- Yuckamurri
- Yuggamurra

== Notable people ==
- Jada Alberts, actor, director, playwright and artist
- Shadeene Evans, soccer player
- Lloyd Johnston, Australian rules footballer
- Lachie Jones, Australian rules footballer
- John Kundereri Moriarty, footballer, activist and businessman

== Sources ==
- "AFL Players Association Indigenous Player Map". AFL Players Association. 2024.
- Baker, Richard Munro (1999). Land Is Life: From Bush to Town - The Story of the Yanyuwa People. Allen & Unwin. ISBN 978-1-741-15072-8.
- Bradley, John James (1988). "Yanyuwa: 'Men speak one way, women speak another'" (PDF). Aboriginal Linguistics. 1: 126–134.
- Bradley, John James (1997). LI-ANTHAWIRRIYAR RA, people of the sea: Yanyuwa relations with their maritime environment (PDF). Northern Territory University PhD.
- Bradley, John James; Kearney, Amanda (2009). "Manankurra: What's in a name? Placenames and emotional geographies". In Hercus, Luise; Koch, Harold (eds.). Aboriginal Placenames: Naming and Re-Naming the Australian Landscape. Australian National University. pp. 463–479. ISBN 978-1-921-66609-4.
- Clark, Jackson (19 August 2023). "Lloyd Johnston to debut for Suns". National Indigenous Times.
- James, Bentley (2009). Time & Tide in the Crocodile Islands: Change and Continuity in Yan-nhaŋu Marine Identity (Thesis). The Australian National University School of Archaeology and Anthropology, ANU.
- Kearney, Amanda (2012). "Present Memories: Indigenous Memory Construct and Cross-Generational Knowledge Exchange in Northern Australia". In Keightley, Emily (ed.). Time, Media and Modernity. Palgrave Macmillan. pp. 165–183. ISBN 978-0-230-27670-3.
- Kearney, Amanda (2014). Cultural Wounding, Healing, and Emerging Ethnicities. Springer. ISBN 978-1-137-47829-0.
- Lo Bianco, J.; Rhydwen, M (2001). "Is the Extinction of Australia's Indigenous Languages Inevitable?". In Fishman, Joshua A. (ed.). Can Threatened Languages be Saved?. Multilingual Matters. pp. 391–422. ISBN 978-1-853-59492-2.
- Mushin, Ilana (2013). A Grammar of (Western) Garrwa. Walter de Gruyter. ISBN 978-1-614-51241-7.
- Roberts, Tony (2005). Frontier Justice: A History of the Gulf Country to 1900. University of Queensland Press. ISBN 978-0-702-24083-6.
- Roberts, Tony (November 2009). "The brutal truth: What happened in the gulf country". The Monthly.
- Tindale, Norman Barnett (1974). "Janjula (NT)". Aboriginal Tribes of Australia: Their Terrain, Environmental Controls, Distribution, Limits, and Proper Names. Australian National University Press. ISBN 978-0-708-10741-6. Archived from the original on 21 January 2018.
