= Waanyi =

Aboriginal people of northern Australia

The Waanyi people, also spelt Wanyi, Wanji, or Waanji, are an Aboriginal Australian people from south of the Gulf of Carpentaria in Queensland and the Northern Territory.

== Language ==
Although the Waanyi language was thought to be extinct, the 2016 Australian census found it to have 16 speakers, down from the recorded peak of 40 in the 2011 Australian census. It is classified as one of the Garrwan languages.

== Country ==
The Waanyi territory was in well-watered limestone and sandstone country, including parts of the Gregory River. In Norman Tindale's estimation, the Waanyi held about 9,700 square miles (25,000 km^{2}) of territory, extending from the vicinity of the south of the upper Nicholson River, west of Corinda, and at Spring and Lawn Hill creeks. Their eastern extension lay at the Barkly (Barclay) River, Lawn Hill and Bannockburn. Their western frontier was at Old Benmara, and south-west they roamed as far as Mount Morgan.

They lay south of the Kunindiri and Garrwa people, west of the Injilarija and Nguburinji peoples, and east of the Wambaya and Wakaya peoples' lands. They took over the land of the Injilarija, who were considered extinguished around 1880, around Lawn Hill (today part of Boodjamulla National Park).

Waanyi people now co-manage the Ganalanga-Mindibirrina Indigenous Protected Area, declared in 2015.

== History ==
The whole area of the north was affected deeply by the pastoral boom opened up in 1881 in the Northern Territory, with massive stations under the control of a few eastern investors hastily stocked with cattle: the key watering sites were locked out, tribes were shot at sight, and many groups moved east into the Gulf of Carpentaria, where the same phenomenon repeated itself. The Waanyi and the Garrwa, like many tribes local to the area that found their lands taken over for pastoral leases and resisted dispossession, found themselves threatened. The Eastern Waanyi were wiped out; settler vigilantes and police magistrates employed native mounted troopers to ambush, murder and massacre any Aboriginal groups they came across. The lessees of Gregory Downs submitted testimony in 1880 that the police rounded up blacks and then shot them, while that of Lawn Hill five years later said that on his cattle run alone police had shot over a hundred blacks in three years, without achieving their aim of stopping the killing of livestock. The displaced Waanyi eventually took over the territory in the Lawn Hill area of the extinct Injilarija.

== Native title ==
The Waanyi first lodged a native title claim over an area known to them traditionally as Wugujaji in June 1994. Under a Queensland Government land act of 1989, CZL was granted two mining leases covering 23,585 hectares extending through Waanyi land the Century Mine was established on it. Eventually the terms of a settlement were agreed on, and CZL paid funding, training and employment to the traditional peoples, an accord known as the $90 million offer.

The Waanyi claim a right to co-manage both the Boodjamulla National Park and Riversleigh World Heritage Area, the latter holding the richest Oligocene and Miocene mammalian and reptile fossil field in the world. In 2010, native title was granted over an area of 17,900 km^{2} (6,900 sq mi) abutting the Northern Territory border, including Boodjamulla, after litigation.

In 2018 a second case was brought for two areas to the west of Doomadgee, one from Turn Off Lagoon as far as the NT border, and the other close to the border of Doomadgee Shire, and Burketown, covering 441 km^{2} (170 sq mi). Native title was formally recognised by consent by the Federal Court of Australia on 22 September 2021, with its timing coinciding with new funding from the Queensland Government for four Indigenous rangers to work in the Boodjamulla and the Riversleigh.

== Notable people ==
- Alexis Wright, a writer of Waanyi descent whose novel Carpentaria (2006) won the Australian Miles Franklin Award
- Charlie Cameron, Australian rules footballer
- Jarrod Cameron, Australian rules footballer
- Sandra Creamer, CEO of the Australian Women's Health Alliance, health and human rights leader

== Alternative names ==
- Waangyee
- Wanee
- Wanji
- Wanyee
- Wonyee

== Sources ==
- Basedow, Herbert (1907). "Anthropological notes on the Western Coastal tribes of the Northern Territory of South Australia". Journal of the Transactions of the Royal Society of South Australia. 31: 1–62 – via BHL.
- Evans, Raymond (2007). A History of Queensland. Cambridge University Press. ISBN 978-0-521-87692-6.
- Harwood, Alison (2002). "Indigenous Sovereignty and Century Zinc". In Evans, Geoffrey Russell; Goodman, James; Lansbury, Nina (eds.). Moving Mountains: Communities Confront Mining and Globalization. Zed Books. pp. 159–171. ISBN 978-1-842-77199-0.
- "Information Service: Queensland: Extinguishment by pastoral lease". AMPLA Bulletin. 14 (2): 90.
- Kerwin, Dale (2011). Aboriginal Dreaming Paths and Trading Routes: The Colonisation of the Australian Economic Landscape. Sussex Academic Press. ISBN 978-1-845-19529-8.
- Mathews, R. H. (1899). "Divisions of tribes in the Northern Territory". Journal of the Proceedings of the Royal Society of New South Wales. 33: 111–114 – via BHL.
- Mathews, R. H. (July–September 1900). "The Wombya Organization of the Australian Aborigines". American Anthropologist. 2 (3): 494–501. doi:10.1525/aa.1900.2.3.02a00050. JSTOR 658964.
- Moseley, Christopher (2008). Encyclopedia of the World's Endangered Languages. Routledge. ISBN 978-1-135-79640-2.
- Mushin, Ilana (2013). A Grammar of (Western) Garrwa. Walter de Gruyter. ISBN 978-1-614-51241-7.
- Ravenscroft, Alison (2016) [First published 2012]. The Postcolonial Eye: White Australian Desire and the Visual Field of Race. Routledge. pp. 59–79. ISBN 978-1-317-01969-5.
- Roberts, Tony (2005). Frontier Justice: A History of the Gulf Country to 1900. University of Queensland Press. ISBN 978-0-702-24083-6.
- Shadforth; Mathews, R. H. (1898). "Group divisions and initiation ceremonies of the Barkungee tribes". Journal of the Proceedings of the Royal Society of New South Wales. 32: 241–255 – via BHL.
- Sharp, Lauriston (December 1935). "Semi-Moieties in North-Western Queensland". Oceania. 6 (2): 158–174. doi:10.1002/j.1834-4461.1935.tb00178.x. JSTOR 40327545.
- Smith, Laurajane (2008). "Empty Gestures? Heritage and the Politics of Recognition". In Silverman, Helaine; Ruggles, D. Fairchild (eds.). Cultural Heritage and Human Rights: Cultural heritage in a globalized world. Springer. pp. 159–171. ISBN 978-0-387-76579-2.
- Spencer, Baldwin (1914). Native tribes of the Northern Territory of Australia (PDF). London: Macmillan Publishers – via Internet Archive.
- Sutton, Peter (2004). Native Title in Australia: An Ethnographic Perspective. Cambridge University Press. ISBN 978-1-139-44949-6.
- Tindale, Norman Barnett (1974). "Wanji (NT)". Aboriginal Tribes of Australia: Their Terrain, Environmental Controls, Distribution, Limits, and Proper Names. Australian National University. ISBN 978-0-708-10741-6.
- Trigger, David (2015). "Change and Succession in Aboriginal Claims to Land". In Toner, P.G. (ed.). Strings of Connectedness: Essays in honour of Ian Keen. Australian National University Press. pp. 53–73. ISBN 978-1-925-02263-6.
- Trigger, David Samuel (1992). Whitefella Comin': Aboriginal Responses to Colonialism in Northern Australia. Cambridge University Press. ISBN 978-0-521-40181-4.
