= Shadforth (disambiguation) =

Shadforth is a village in County Durham, England.

Shadforth may also refer to:

- Shadforth, Western Australia, locality in the Shire of Denmark
- Dawn Shadforth (born 1973), British director
- William Shadforth (1912–2000), Australian Aboriginal pastoralist
