= Acacia subternata =

Scientific classification
- Kingdom: Plantae
- Clade: Tracheophytes
- Clade: Angiosperms
- Clade: Eudicots
- Clade: Rosids
- Order: Fabales
- Family: Fabaceae
- Subfamily: Caesalpinioideae
- Clade: Mimosoid clade
- Genus: Acacia
- Species: A. subternata

Binomial name
- Acacia subternata F.Muell.
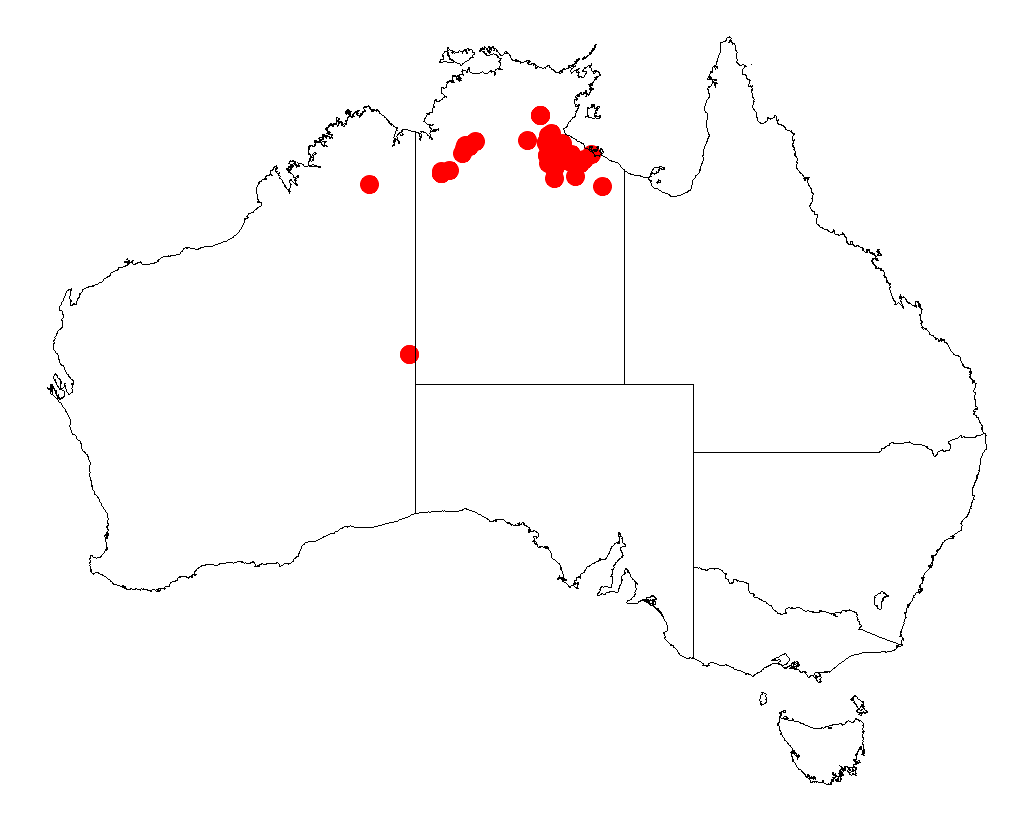
- Occurrence data from AVH

Species of legume

Acacia subternata is a shrub of the genus Acacia and the subgenus Plurinerves that is endemic to an area of northern Australia.

== Description ==
The shrub typically grows to a maximum height of around 1.2 m (3 ft 11 in) and has an erect to semi-prostrate or domed habit. It branches from close to ground level and has smooth to slightly fissured grey-brown coloured bark.

== Taxonomy ==
The species was first formally described by the botanist Ferdinand von Mueller in 1859 as a part of the work Contributiones ad Acaciarum Australiae Cognitionem as published in the Journal of the Proceedings of the Linnean Society, Botany. It was reclassified by Leslie Pedley in 2003 then returned to genus Acacia in 2006.

== Distribution ==
The shrub is native to the top end of the Northern Territory with the bulk of the population found from around Borroloola in the south east to the Victoria river in the south west. It is often situated on sandstone or quartzite ridges growing in skeletal sandy loam soils as a part of Eucalyptus woodland communities and is found with a spinifex understorey.

== See also ==
- List of Acacia species
