= Ganalanga-Mindibirrina Indigenous Protected Area =

Protected area in Northern Territory, Australia

Coordinates: 25°3′S 130°15′E

The GanaIanga-Mindibirrina Indigenous Protected Area (IPA) encompasses over 10,000 km^{2} (3,900 sq mi) of the Waanyi Garawa Aboriginal Land Trust area in the southern Gulf of Carpentariain the Northern Territory of Australia, the traditional lands of the Waanyi and Garawa people. The IPA is managed by them through the Waanyi Garawa and Garawa Ranger groups, administered by the Carpentaria Land Council Aboriginal Corporation.

IPAs are areas of land and sea Country managed by First Nations groups for biodiversity conservation and cultural outcomes through voluntary agreements with the Australian Government. These areas for part of Australia's National Reserve System.

Dedicated in 2015, the GanaIanga-Mindibirrina IPA Ganalanga, the Nicholson River Basin, as well as monsoon forests, spinifex grasslands and black soil plains.

Fire management is a considerable part of ranger activities, undertaking early dry season burns from helicopters. This contributes to the Gulf Fire Abatement Project, that uses customary Indigenous fire management to reduce CO2e emissions released through wildfires, selling offset contracts.
