= Acacia conspersa =

Scientific classification
- Kingdom: Plantae
- Clade: Tracheophytes
- Clade: Angiosperms
- Clade: Eudicots
- Clade: Rosids
- Order: Fabales
- Family: Fabaceae
- Subfamily: Caesalpinioideae
- Clade: Mimosoid clade
- Genus: Acacia
- Species: A. conspersa

Binomial name
- Acacia conspersa F.Muell.
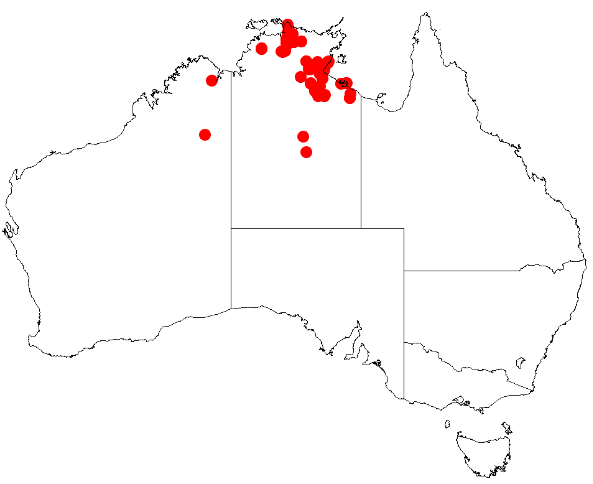
- Occurrence data from AVH

Synonyms
- Racosperma conspersum (F.Muell.) Pedley

Species of legume

Acacia conspersa is a species of flowering plant in the family Fabaceae and is endemic to the Northern Territory of Australia. It is a shrub or tree with fissured or rough and stringy bark, narrowly elliptic phyllodes with a pointed tip, spikes of bright yellow flowers and linear, leathery, curved pods.

== Description ==
Acacia conspersa is shrub or tree that typically grows a height of up to 7.5 m (25 ft) and has fissured or rough and stringy bark, and densely hairy, wand-like branchlets. The phyllodes are narrowly elliptic, leathery, 50–80 mm (2.0–3.1 in) long,5–10 mm (0.20–0.39 in) wide and narrowed near the tip, with a sometimes sharply-pointed tip. There are stipules 1–2 mm (0.039–0.079 in) long at the base of the phyllodes. The flowers are borne in bright yellow spikes 30–50 mm (1.2–2.0 in) long on a peduncle 1–3 mm (0.039–0.118 in) long. Flowering occurs from April and October, and the pods are linear, leathery and curved, 40–130 mm (1.6–5.1 in) long and 2.5–4 mm (0.098–0.157 in) wide with dark brown seeds 4.6–5.7 mm (0.18–0.22 in) long.

== Taxonomy ==
Acacia conspersa was first formally described in 1859 by Ferdinand von Mueller in the Journal of the Proceedings of the Linnean Society, Botany near the junction of the Roper and Limmen Bight Rivers.

== Distribution and habitat ==
This species of wattle is endemic to tropical areas of the Northern Territory where it often grows in colonies in stony, sandy soils, or in alluvium, in grassland, shrubland, woodland or tall wet forest, along creeks, on hills or in gullies.

== Conservation status ==
Acacia conspersa is listed as of "least concern" under the Northern Territory Government Territory Parks and Wildlife Conservation Act.

== See also ==
- List of Acacia species
