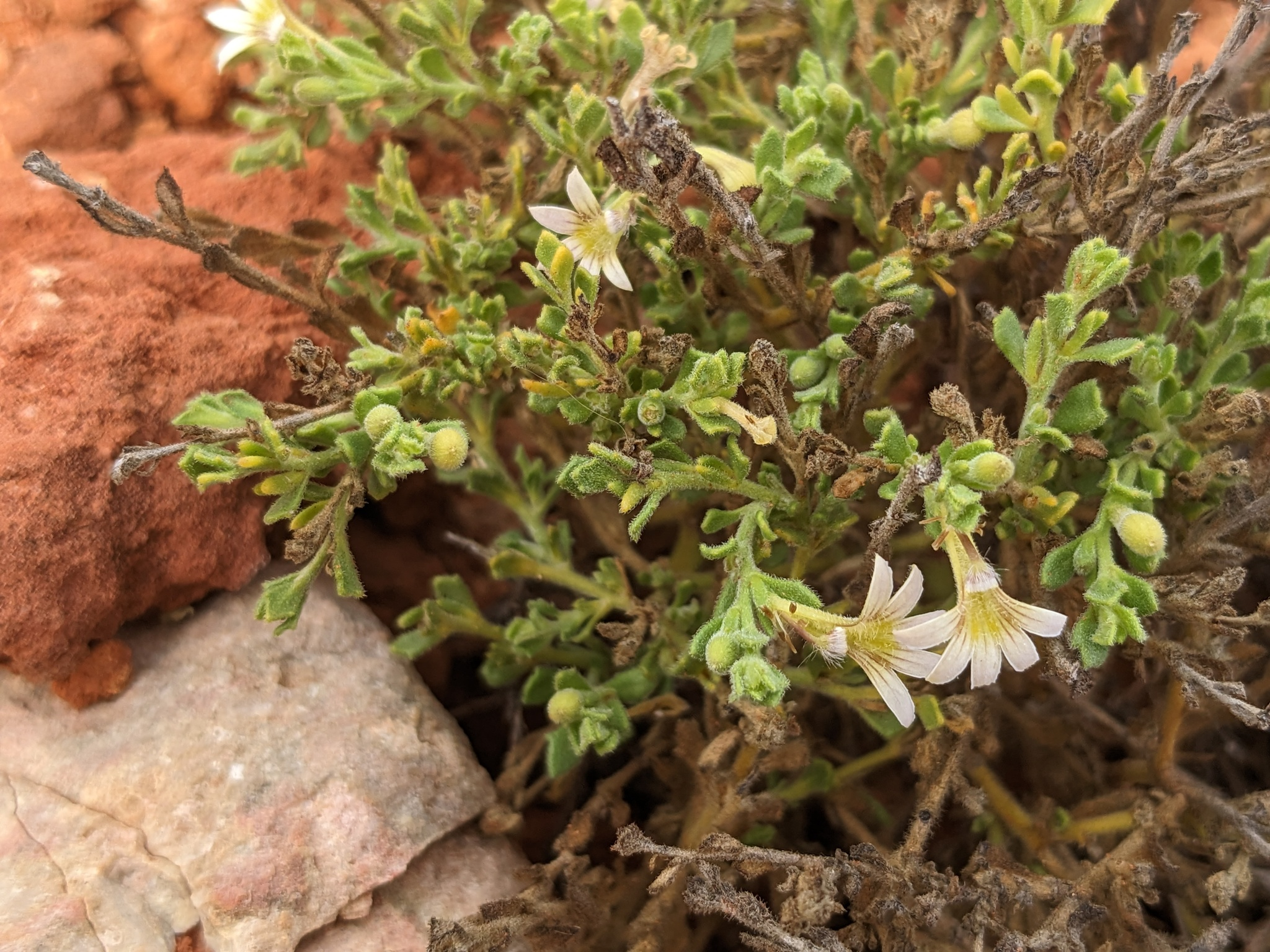

Scientific classification
- Kingdom: Plantae
- Clade: Tracheophytes
- Clade: Angiosperms
- Clade: Eudicots
- Clade: Asterids
- Order: Asterales
- Family: Goodeniaceae
- Genus: Scaevola
- Species: S. amblyanthera

Binomial name
- Scaevola amblyanthera F.Muell.
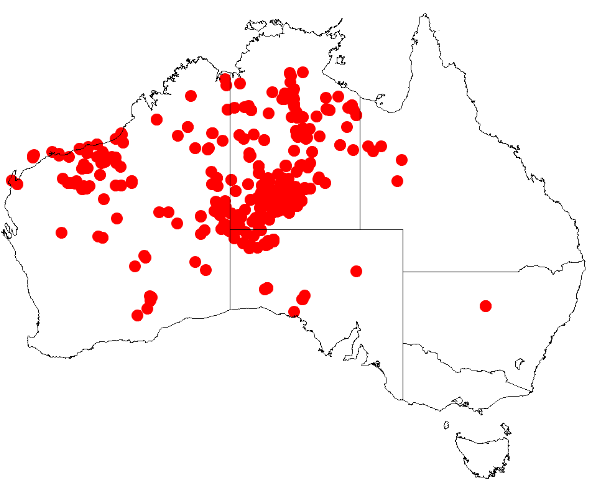
- Occurrence data from the Australasian Virtual Herbarium

Synonyms
- Lobelia amblyanthera (F.Muell.) Kuntze; Scaevola decipiens W.Fitzg.

= Scaevola amblyanthera =

Species of plant

Scaevola amblyanthera is a flowering plant in the family Goodeniaceae, and is endemic to Australia. It is a spreading, hairy subshrub with sessile, narrowly elliptic to egg-shaped leaves with the narrower end towards the base, usually with toothed edges, mauve, pale pink or white fan-shaped flowers and oval fruit.

== Description ==
Scaevola amblyanthera is usually a hairy subshrub that typically grows to a height of 70 cm (28 in). Its leaves are sessile, narrowly elliptic to egg-shaped with the narrower end towards the base, usually with toothed edges, 8–30 mm (0.31–1.18 in) long and 2–9 mm (0.079–0.354 in) wide. The flowers are borne in spikes up to 120 mm (4.7 in) long with leaf-like bracts and smaller egg-shaped, elliptic or linear bracteoles 4–6 mm (0.16–0.24 in) long. The sepals are Δ-shaped, about 1 mm (0.039 in) long and joined at the base. The petals are mauve, pale pink or white, 8–16 mm (0.31–0.63 in) long, covered with soft hairs and densely bearded inside with wings about 0.7 mm (0.028 in) wide. The ovary has two locules with white or purplish hairs at the base. Flowering occurs from March to October, and the fruit is oval, hairy and up to 4 mm (0.16 in) long.

== Taxonomy ==
Scaevola amblyanthera was first formally described in 1859 by Ferdinand von Mueller in his Fragmenta Phytographiae Australiae, from specimens collected near the Nicholson River in the Gulf of Carpentaria. The specific epithet (amblyanthera) means 'a blunt anther'.

In 1992, Roger Carolin described two varieties of S. amblyanthera in the Flora of Australia, and the names are accepted by the Australian Plant Census.

- Scaevola amblyanthera F.Muell. var. amblyanthera has no, or very sparse glandular hairs, and curled or tangled simple hairs, often so dense as to almost hide the leaf surface.
- Scaevola amblyanthera var. centralis Carolin has many glandular hairs and simple leaves not usually dense or tangled, the leaf surface visible beneath the hairs.

== Distribution and habitat ==
This species of Scaevola occurs in Western Australia, the Northern Territory, South Australia and Queensland. The variety amblyanthera grows in a variety of habitats in northern Australia, from the Kimberley region of Western Australia to the Barkly Tableland of the Northern Territory and western Queensland. Var. centralis occurs in a variety of habitats in the drier parts of Australia, in Western Australia, the Northern Territory, and South Australia between 117°E and 139°E and south of 20°S.

== Conservation status ==
Both varieties of Scaevola amblyanthera are listed as "not threatened" by the Government of Western Australia Department of Biodiversity, Conservation and Attractions.
