= Robinson River (Northern Territory) =

Robinson
- Location of the Robinson River mouth in the Northern Territory
- Etymology: Joseph Phelps Robinson

Location
- Country: Australia
- Territory: Northern Territory

Physical characteristics
- Source
  - location: Barkly Tableland, Australia
  - elevation: 343 m (1,125 ft)
- Mouth
  - location: Gulf of Carpentaria, Australia
  - coordinates: 16°02′55″S 137°14′41″E
  - elevation: 0 m (0 ft)
- Length: 215 km (134 mi)
- Basin size: 11,369 km^{2} (4,390 sq mi)
- Discharge
  - average: 31.7 m^{3}/s (1,120 cu ft/s)

The Robinson River is a river in Australia's Northern Territory.

== Description ==
The headwaters of the river rise on the Barkly Tableland and flow in a northerly direction across mostly uninhabited plains, crossing Highway 1 then past the Seven Emu homestead before eventually discharging into the Gulf of Carpentaria approximately 60 kilometres (37 mi) east of Borroloola.

The estuary at the river mouth occupies an area of 10.15 square kilometres (4 sq mi) and is in near pristine condition. It is river dominated in nature with a wave dominated delta and has an area of 142 hectares (351 acres) covered with mangroves.

The drainage basin occupies an area of 11,369 square kilometres (4,390 sq mi) and is wedged between the catchment areas for McArthur River to the west and Calvert River to the east and the Barkly to the south. The river has a mean annual outflow of 1,000 gigalitres (1.308×10^{9} cu yd).

== Flora and fauna ==
Stands of Cycas angulata are found along the lower reaches of the river.

A total of 33 species of fish are found in the river including: sailfin glassfish, barred grunter, snub-nosed garfish, fly-specked hardyhead, mouth almighty, golden flathead goby, spangled perch, barramundi, mangrove jack, chequered rainbowfish, giant gudgeon, spotted scat, freshwater longtom, and seven-spot archerfish.

The critically endangered largetooth sawfish has been caught in the river mouth. The endangered gulf snapping turtle has been found in the upper reaches of the Robinson.

== History ==
The traditional owners of the area are the Garawa and the Gunindiri peoples.

The river was named by Ludwig Leichhardt during his expedition from Queensland to Port Essington in 1845. Leichhardt named the river after one of the supporters of the expedition, Joseph Phelps Robinson, a well known philanthropist, banker and Quaker.

In 1992 the Robinson River pastoral lease and surrounding areas were handed back to the Garawa people who had started working on the land claim in 1980.

== See also ==
- List of rivers of Australia § Northern Territory
