= Pungalina-Seven Emu Sanctuary =

Protected area in the Northern Territory, Australia

Pungalina-Seven Emu
- IUCN category II (national park)
- Location within Northern Territory
- Location: Northern Territory
- Nearest city: Borroloola
- Coordinates: 16°31′54″S 137°24′46″E
- Area: 3,072.12 km^{2} (1,186.15 sq mi)
- Established: 2009
- Governing body: Australian Wildlife Conservancy
- Website: Official website

Pungalina-Seven Emu Sanctuary is a 3060 km^{2} private protected area in the Northern Territory of Australia. It is managed by the Australian Wildlife Conservancy (AWC) which purchased Pungalina Station in 2009, with some assistance from the Wildlife Australia Fund. It adjoins the Gulf of Carpentaria near the border with Queensland, lying in the Gulf Coastal bioregion. The reserve is bordered by Calvert Hills and Wollogorang Stations to the south and east. The nearest town is Borroloola, 150 km to the west.

== History ==
The reserve is made up of two separate pastoral properties, Pungalina and Seven Emu. Pungalina is a former cattle station while Seven Emu is currently owned by a Garawa man, Frank Shadforth, who has subleased 110,000 hectares (270,000 acres) of the property to AWC for wildlife conservation since 2009. Seven Emu has 55 kilometres (34 mi) of coastline and links Pungalina to the coast. The arrangement is a historic partnership between a non-profit, private conservation organisation and an Indigenous landholder.

Seven Emu is named after Seven Emu Creek, which runs through the property. It was explorer Ludwig Leichhardt who named the creek, after shooting a mob of emus nearby when on his way to Port Essington in 1844–5.

== Landscape and ecosystems ==
The Gulf Coastal bioregion is characterised by:

"...gently undulating coastal plains along the southern Gulf of Carpentaria from near the Roper River to near the Queensland border, with scattered rugged areas of Proterozoic sandstones. Soils are predominantly sandy red earths and shallow gravelly sands. The climate is tropical with annual rainfall between 800 and 1200 mm, falling mostly between December and March; cyclones are a frequent phenomenon. The bioregion encompasses the lower reaches of many major rivers. Eucalyptus woodland with tussock or hummock grass understorey dominates the bioregion, with significant areas of tidal flats, mangroves and littoral grassland."

The reserve contains a variety of habitat types including, from south to north, eucalypt woodlands on sandstone plateaus with pockets of dry rainforest in deep gorges, floodplain woodlands and freshwater wetlands, coastal monsoon rainforest, littoral saline grasslands, mangroves, and intertidal mudflats. There is an abrupt transition, marked by an escarpment, between the plateau and the floodplain. The Calvert River drains the dissected plateau country through a network of steep-sided gorges and flows north-eastwards through the lowlands of the reserve before emptying into the Gulf of Carpentaria.

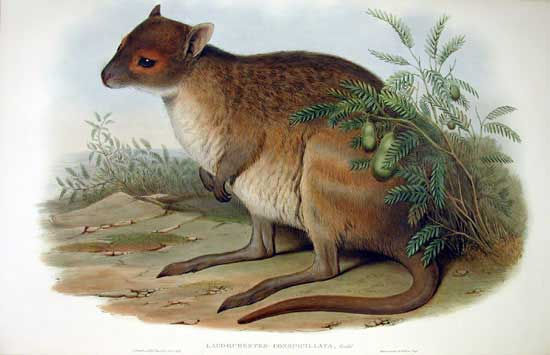
Spectacled hare-wallaby

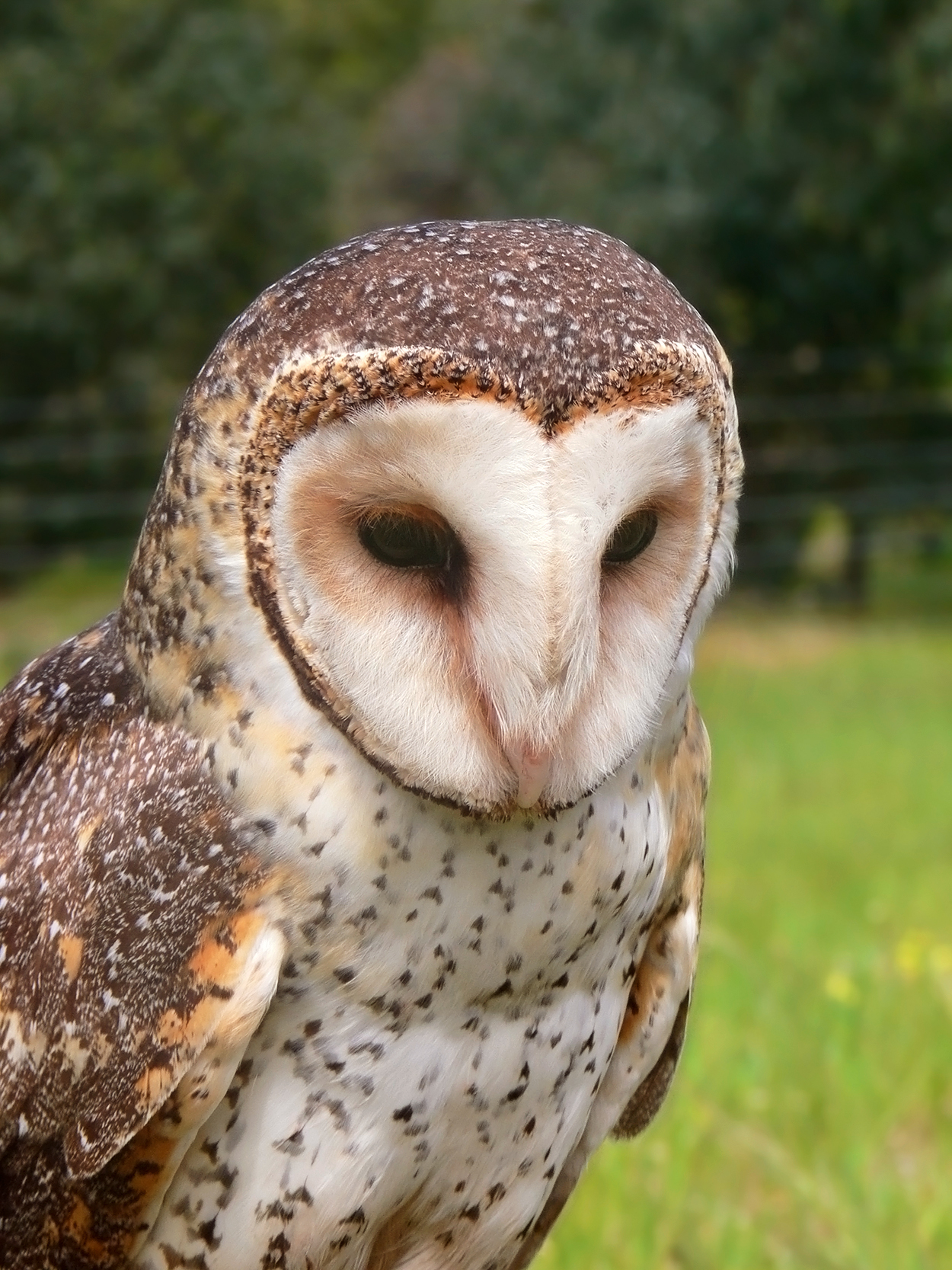
Masked owl

== Fauna ==
An initial faunal survey in 2009 found over 231 vertebrate species present, including 19 native mammals, 151 birds and 61 kinds of reptiles and frogs, representing more than half of the nearly 430 native species that are predicted to occur on the reserve. Animals listed as threatened include the masked owl, red goshawk, Gouldian finch, Carpentarian false antechinus, freshwater sawfish, Mertens' water monitor and Gulf snapping turtle. Other birds and mammals recorded include the purple-crowned fairy-wren, Australian bustard, short-eared rock-wallaby, spectacled hare-wallaby and northern brown bandicoot. Marine species recorded off the beach include Indo-Pacific humpback dolphin, loggerhead turtle, green turtle, shovelnose shark and giant trevally, as well as saltwater crocodiles.

The coastal and subcoastal habitats of the southern Gulf region are not as well known ornithologically as the Top End to the west and the Cape York Peninsula to the east, with several birds having gaps in their recorded ranges between the two areas. Birds recorded in the reserve during the survey that help fill the distributional gaps include the Pacific baza, little bronze-cuckoo, figbird and white-breasted whistler.

== Seven Emu Station ==
Seven Emu Station is a working cattle station, which has been in the Shadforth family since Garawa man William (Willie) Shadforth bought it outright for cash in 1953. The Shadforths were one of the early settler families in the region, and many of the Shadforth men partnered with local Garawa and Yanyuwa women. Willie was an expert cattle drover and horse trader, who moved cattle and horses between Queensland, the NT, Western Australia and South Australia. He bought the pastoral lease for £10,000 from his friend George Butcher after first winning money on a horse in the Caulfield Cup, and then putting all of his winnings on 14-to-1 outsider in the Melbourne Cup, winning there again. He was the first Indigenous Australian to purchase such a property.

Willie passed on the property to his son Frank (the seventh of ten children), who now looks after guests, while Frank's son Clarry and his children manage the cattle station. Tourists who visit the property are given guided tours which pass on some of the Garawa traditions and culture as well as native fauna and stories of European exploration of the area. Willie had maintained his traditional culture, such as in ceremonies and law, and passed his knowledge down to Frank.

Frank started running a self-funded program in the 2010s to help give Aboriginal boys and girls who have been in trouble a second chance in life, teaching them skills such as catching bulls, building fences and mustering. In mid-2020, the Northern Territory Government started funding for the program, committing A$4.5 million to run youth camps over the following five years. There will be a series of intensive short-term camps and longer ones. Dale Wakefield, the NT Minister for Territory Families, said that the camps "not only focus on personal responsibility and consequences, but they will also give young people a way out of crime by connecting them with practical learning, vocational education training and work programs". Permanent accommodation will be built for residents of the long-term camps, who will be youths struggling to get out of the juvenile justice system in the Northern Territory.
