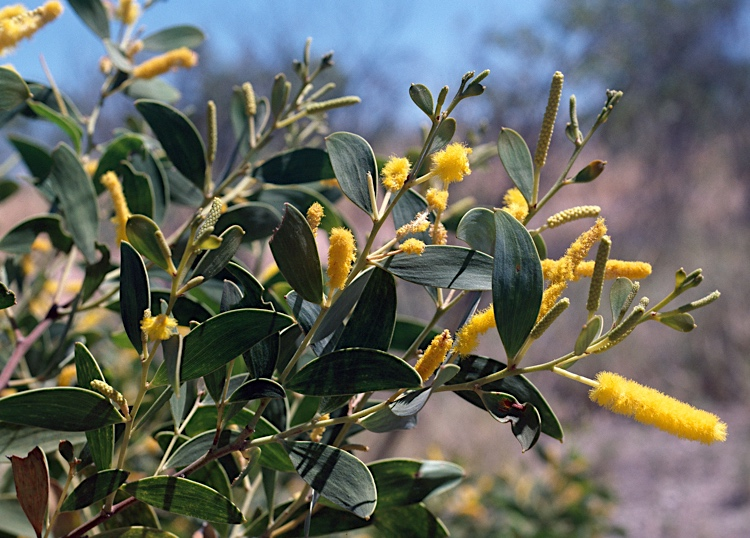
- Near Jasper Gorge, in the Northern Territory

Scientific classification
- Kingdom: Plantae
- Clade: Embryophytes
- Clade: Tracheophytes
- Clade: Angiosperms
- Clade: Eudicots
- Clade: Rosids
- Order: Fabales
- Family: Fabaceae
- Subfamily: Caesalpinioideae
- Clade: Mimosoid clade
- Genus: Acacia
- Species: A. limbata

Binomial name
- Acacia limbata F.Muell.
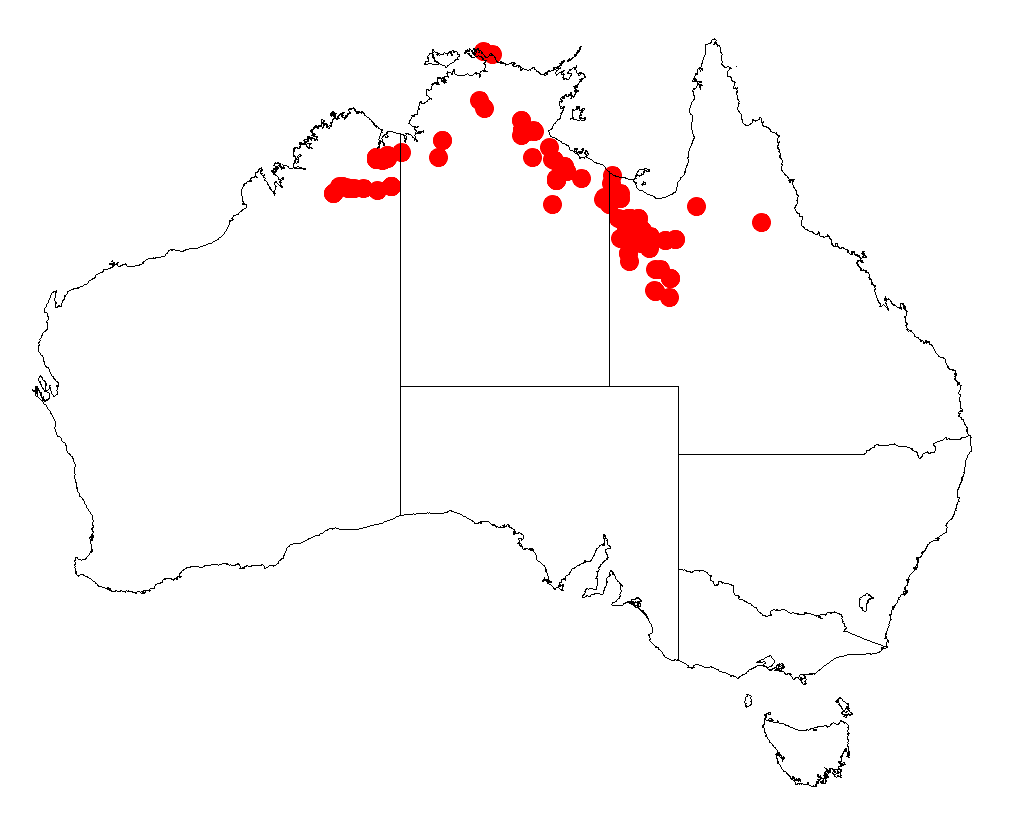
- Occurrence data from AVH

Synonyms
- Racosperma limbatum (F.Muell.) Pedley

= Acacia limbata =

Species of legume

Acacia limbata is a species of flowering plant in the family Fabaceae and is endemic to northern Australia. It is a slender, glabrous, resinous shrub with fissured greyish bark, glabrous branchlets often covered with a powdery bloom, oblique, narrowly elliptic, oblong or lance-shaped phyllodes often continuous with the branchlets, spikes of bright yellow flowers, and erect, mostly narrowly lance-shaped pods with the narrower end towards the base.

== Description ==
Acacia limbata is a slender, glabrous, resinous shrub that typically grows to a height of 0.4–2 m (1–7 ft) and has longitudinally fissured, grey or greyish brown bark. Its branchlets are not resinous, flattened towards the ends, have prominent ridges, and are often covered with a powdery bloom. Its phyllodes are often continuous with the branchlets, obliquely narrowly elliptic, elliptic or lance-shaped with the narrower end towards the base, often with one edge convex and the other more or less straight, 60–100 mm (2.4–3.9 in) long, 10–25 mm (0.39–0.98 in) wide with prominently pale edges. The phyllodes are slightly leathery, glabrous and have three prominent parallel veins and two or three minor veins per mm.

The flowers are bright yellow, and borne in one or two spikes 9–25 mm (0.35–0.98 in) long. Flowering occurs from January to July in the Northern Territory, and the pods are erect, mostly narrowly lance-shaped with the narrower end towards the base, straight sides and more or less flat, 38–85 mm (1.5–3.3 in) long, 7–14 mm (0.28–0.55 in) wide, more or less woody, reddish or purplish-brown. The seeds are elliptic to egg-shaped, 4.6–6.6 mm (0.18–0.26 in) long and brownish black with a top-shaped aril.

== Taxonomy ==
Acacia limbata was first formally described in 1859 by Ferdinand von Mueller in Journal of the Proceedings of the Linnean Society, Botany. The specific epithet (limbata) means 'possessing a border' (often indicating a border of a different colour or texture), referring to the pods.

== Distribution and habitat ==
This species of wattle grows in sandstone in gravelly soils on stony hillsides in open eucalypt woodland, usually near creeks and often with Melaleuca species from the Ord region in the Kimberley region of Western Australia to the McArthur River in the Northern Territory and in the extreme north-west of Queensland.

== Conservation status ==
Acacia limbata is listed as 'not threatened' by the Government of Western Australia Department of Biodiversity, Conservation and Attractions, and as 'least concern' under the Queensland Government Nature Conservation Act 1992 and the Northern Territory Territory Parks and Wildlife Conservation Act.

== See also ==
- List of Acacia species
