= Calvert River =

Calvert
- Location of the Calvert River mouth in the Northern Territory
- Etymology: John Calvert

Location
- Country: Australia
- Territory: Northern Territory

Physical characteristics
- Source
  - location: Australia
  - elevation: 273 m (896 ft)
- Mouth
  - location: Gulf of Carpentaria, Australia
  - coordinates: 16°17′54″S 137°43′57″E
  - elevation: 0 m (0 ft)
- Length: 222 km (138 mi)
- Basin size: 10,333 km^{2} (3,990 sq mi)
- Discharge
  - average: 31.7 m^{3}/s (1,120 cu ft/s)

The Calvert River is a river in the Northern Territory of Australia.

== Course ==
The headwaters rise on a plain between the Calvert Hills and China Wall and flow northward through mostly uninhabited lands and pastoral leases such as Calvert Hills Station before finally discharging into the Gulf of Carpentaria 150 kilometres (93 mi) east of Borroloola, not far from the border with Queensland in the Gulf Coastal bioregion. It has a mean annual outflow of 1,000 gigalitres (1.308×10^{9} cu yd), Before reaching the sea it flows through the Australian Wildlife Conservancy’s Pungalina-Seven Emu Sanctuary.

Fourteen tributaries feed the river including; Bloodwood Creek, Tobacco Creek, Goanna Creek, Pungalina Creek and the Little Calvert River.

== Catchment ==
The river’s catchment area is 10,033 square kilometres (3,874 sq mi), wedged between the watersheds for the Robinson River to the west, Settlement Creek to east and the Nicholson River to the south. It contains no major towns and the population was 103 in 2001, 45% of whom are Aboriginal people. The river is not dammed, nor used for irrigation. The main economic activity is cattle grazing.

A total of 34 species of fish are found in the river including; the Glassfish, barred grunter, Sonub nosed Garfish, Milkfish, Fly-specked Hardyhead, Treadfin Silver Biddy, Flathead Goby, Spangled Perch, barramundi, Oxeye Herring, Rainbowfish, Black-banded Rainbowfish, Northern Trout Gudgeon, Bony Bream, Catfish, Spotted Scat, Hyrtl's Tandan, Freshwater Longtom, Seven-spot Archerfish and the Giant Gudgeon. The endangered Gulf snapping turtle has been found in the upper reaches of the river.

== History ==
The traditional owners of the area are the Garawa peoples.

The river was named by Ludwig Leichhardt when on expedition from Queensland to Darwin in 1845. He named the river for another member of his party, John Calvert, in acknowledgement of his good service to the expedition.

== See also ==
- List of rivers of Australia § Northern Territory
