= Settlement Creek =

Settlement
- Location of the Settlement Creek mouth in Queensland
- Native name: Wollogorang (Ganggalida)

Location
- Country: Australia
- Territory and State: Northern Territory, Queensland

Physical characteristics
- Source: Calvert Hills
  - location: north of Jilundarina, Northern Territory
  - elevation: 303 m (994 ft)
- Mouth: Gulf of Carpentaria
  - location: Tully Inlet, Queensland
  - coordinates: 16°32′31″S 138°08′21″E
  - elevation: 0 m (0 ft)
- Length: 142 km (88 mi)
- Basin size: 15,600 km^{2} (6,000 sq mi)
- Discharge
  - average: 86.2 m^{3}/s (3,040 cu ft/s)

The Settlement Creek (Ganggalida: Wollogorang) is a creek in the Northern Territory and the state of Queensland, Australia.

== Course and features ==
The headwaters of the creek rise between Calvert Hills and China Wall in the Northern Territory and flows in a north easterly direction. It flows through mostly uninhabited plains country through Wollogorang Station then crosses the border into the northwest region of Queensland and later discharges into the Tully Inlet and then the Gulf of Carpentaria. As it flows through the savannah country it has carved out several waterholes that are critical habitat for many animals during the dry season.

During the wet season the creek is transformed when the waters breach the banks filling the floodplains create immense wetland areas.

A total of eleven tributaries flow into Settlement Creek, including Bullet Creek, Nine Mile Creek, One Mile Creek, Tom (Magira) Creek, Redbank Creek and Camel Creek. The creek also flows through a number of permanent waterholes such as Gudindjina Waterhole, Baladana Waterhole and Dijwalnguna Waterhole. The creek descends 303 metres (994 ft) over its 142-kilometre (88 mi) course.

The catchment area occupies a total area of 15,600 square kilometres (6,023 sq mi) of which an area of 5,494 square kilometres (2,121 sq mi) is in the Northern Territory and the rest in Queensland. The watershed is wedged between the watersheds for the Calvert River to the west, the Nicholson River to the south and east. The population living within the catchment area is less than 100. The catchment area is mostly devoted to pastoralism with many cattle stations. Other streams found in the catchment include James, Scrutton and Lagoon Creeks. Important wetlands found in the catchment include Wentworth Aggregation and sections of the Marless Lagoon and Southern Gulf Aggregation.

The creek has a mean annual discharge of 2,720 gigalitres (5.983×10^{11} imp gal; 7.185×10^{11} US gal) per annum.

== Fauna ==
31 species of fish are found in the creek, including the glassfish, barred grunter, silver cobbler, milkfish, fly-specked hardyhead, treadfin silver biddy, golden goby goby, barramundi, oxeye herring, mangrove jack, chequered rainbowfish, bony bream, catfish, Hyrtl's tandan, freshwater longtom, seven-spot archerfish and the gulf grunter.

== History ==
The traditional owners of the area are the Ganggalida and Gananggallanda peoples, who know the creek as Wollogorang, which in their language means "happy running waters".

The creek was later named by George De Lautour in 1873 when he travelled from Townsville to Port Darwin overlanding 100 head of cattle. Upon reaching the creek he sent two of his party back to Burketown as he considered them useless in the bush.

The first Europeans to visit the area was the Ludwig Leichhardt expedition of 1845 from Queensland to Port Essington. The first pastoral leases were granted to settlers in 1881 when the Chisholm family took up Wollogorang Station in 1881.

The river is prone to flooding following heavy rain events. In 2006 floodwaters from the creek and its tributaries closed the Carpentaria Highway, part of Highway One. The dirt road was closed for over a week and required major maintenance following the deluge.

In 2006 the creek was also earmarked by the Queensland government for declaration under the wild rivers legislation. Settlement Creek, Morning Inlet and the Gregory and Staaten rivers were all being considered for the extra level of protection with property owners being advised of the plan and given time to comment. By 2007 all the waterways had been declared as wild rivers.

== See also ==
- List of rivers of Australia § Northern Territory
- List of rivers of Australia § Queensland
