= Wildlife Australia Fund =

Wildlife Australia Fund, Inc.
- Founded: 2006
- Type: Charitable trust
- Region served: World wide
- Method: Fundraising, research, land acquisition, public education
- Website: http://www.wildlifeaustralia.org

Wildlife Australia Fund, Inc. is a United States based international charitable organization established for the conservation, research and restoration of the environment. It was established and founded by an American and is supported by Australian expatriates in New York. It is established to assist in the acquisition of land in Australia for the conservation of threatened species and ecosystems, conducting research into conservation and biodiversity in Australia and undertaking public education regarding Australian wildlife conservation. It encourages active participation worldwide to help restore the balance to the delicate ecosystem of Australia. Funding comes from tax-deductible donations from the public.

== History ==
The organisation was founded by American, John Streicker, Chairman of Sentinel Corporation. Streicker, a New Yorker, visited Australia after 11 September, where he ended up buying a flower farm outside of Perth, Western Australia. Following that visit, Streicker met Atticus Fleming, Chief Executive of Australian Wildlife Conservancy (AWC) who introduced him to the natural diversity of Australia's unique and endangered species and ecosystems.

Upon returning to the United States, Streicker established Wildlife Australia Fund, Inc., which is a 501(c)(3) public charity. It is supported by a group of Australian expatriates living in New York City who wanted to highlight to the world the global significance of Australia's unique wildlife and the extinction threat that they face, as well as a vehicle in which globally based Australians and their international friends could financially contribute and give back to the Australian community. The expatriate supporters will be hosting fundraising events throughout the United States in order to support various projects of the Wildlife Australia Fund.

== Objectives ==
- To protect and enhance the natural environment;
- To educate the public and raise awareness of Australia's unique wildlife and ecosystems;
- To educate the public and raise awareness of the threats to Australia's unique wildlife and ecosystems;
- To research and act in the protection of threatened or endangered species;
- To acquire land for the conservation of threatened species and ecosystems

== Projects ==
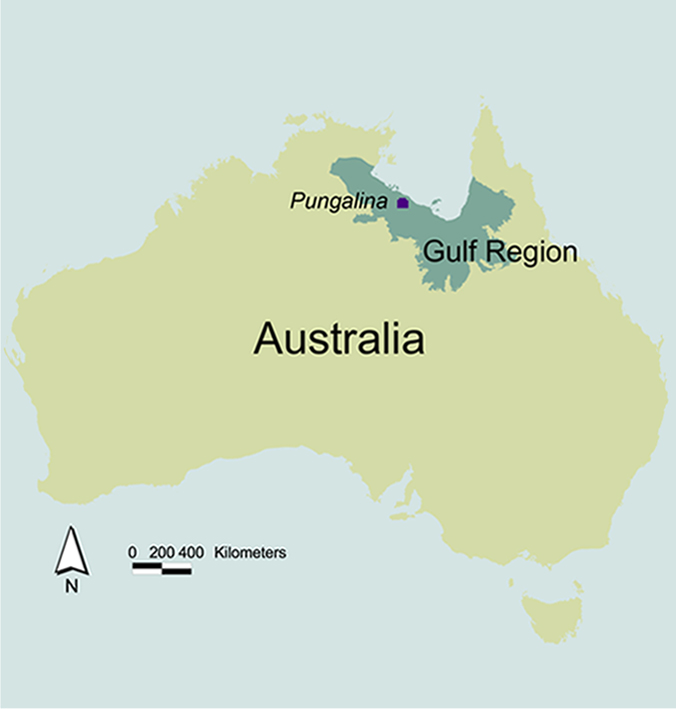
The location of Pungalina in the Northern Territory of Australia

One of Wildlife Australia Fund's first major projects is to actively support a contract to purchase Pungalina Station, a vast property covering 195,000 hectares (480,000 acres) in the outback of the Northern Territory. Pungalina is seen by Wildlife Australia Fund as one of the last great wilderness areas of northern Australia and its acquisition is important for the conservation of a suite of unique and endangered Australian flora and fauna, including 500 plant species, 20 frog species, 75 reptile species, 170 bird species, and 35 mammal species.

== See also ==
- Conservation in Australia
