= Rosie River =

Rosie
- Location of the Rosie River mouth in the Northern Territory

Location
- Country: Australia
- Territory: Northern Territory

Physical characteristics
- Source: Tawallah Range
  - elevation: 76 m (249 ft)
- Mouth: Gulf of Carpentaria
  - location: Australia
  - coordinates: 15°26′31″S 136°11′14″E
  - elevation: 0 m (0 ft)
- Basin size: 5,044 km^{2} (1,947 sq mi)
- Discharge
  - average: 17.1 m^{3}/s (600 cu ft/s)

Basin features
- Tributaries
  - right: Little Rosie Creek, Jumpup Creek, Buffalo Creek (Australia), Warramana Creek

The Rosie River also known as Rosie Creek is a river in the Northern Territory, Australia.

The headwaters at found at the northern end of the Tawallah Range and the river flows in an easterly direction across the uninhabited plain then discharging into the Gulf of Carpentaria.

The estuary at the river mouth occupies an area of 7.04 square kilometres (3 sq mi) and is in near pristine condition. It is river dominated in nature with a wave dominated delta and multiple channels and has an area of 25.4 hectares (63 acres) covered with mangroves.

The catchment occupies an area of 5,044 square kilometres (1,947 sq mi) and is situated between the Limmen Bight River catchment to the north and east and the McArthur River catchment to the south. The river has a mean annual outflow of 540 gigalitres (706,300,000 cu yd).

== See also ==
- List of rivers of Australia § Northern Territory
