= Gunindiri dialect =

Extinct Australian Aboriginal language

Gunindiri
- Kurnindirri, Heavy/Eastern Garrwa
- Native to: Australia
- Region: Northern Territory
- Ethnicity: Gunindirri
- Extinct: (date missing)
- Language family: Garrwan: Garrwa; Gunindiri

Language codes
- ISO 639-3: –
- Glottolog: kuni1269
- AIATSIS: C23 Gunindirri

Gunindiri (also spelled Kurnindirri) is an extinct Australian Aboriginal language of northern Australia, formerly spoken by the Gunindiri and considered a dialect of Garrwa.
