= Garrwa language =

Australian Aboriginal language

Garrwa
- Garawa, Gaarwa, Karawa; Leearrawa
- Native to: Australia
- Region: Northern Territory
- Ethnicity: Garrwa
- Native speakers: 150 (2021 census)
- Language family: Garrwan: Garrwa
- Dialects: Western/Light Garrwa; Gunindiri †

Language codes
- ISO 639-3: wrk
- Glottolog: gara1269
- AIATSIS: N155
- ELP: Garrwa
- Garrwa is classified as Severely Endangered by the UNESCO Atlas of the World's Languages in Danger.

Garrwa, also spelt Garawa, Gaarwa, or Karawa and also known as Leearrawa, is an Australian Aboriginal language spoken by the Garrwa people of a northern region of the Northern Territory of Australia.

== Dialects ==
Garrwa is divided into two dialects, Western Garrwa and Gunindiri (Eastern Garrwa). The two dialects share 83% of their vocabulary, according to Gavan Breen.

== Geographical distribution ==
The territory across which Garrwa was spoken stretches from the east bank of the McArthur River at Borroloola to the direction of Doomadgee and the Nicholson River, across from the border with Queensland. Originally, the eastern bank of the Gulf of Carpentaria was not occupied by the Garrwa, but many identify today with the territory around the mouths of the Wearyan, Folsche, and Robinson Rivers.

== History ==
The most significant blow to the language vitality of Garrwa was the introduction of television to Borroloola in the 1980s, which caused the decline of many activities in which Garrwa was spoken in, such as "communal cultural activities" held in the evenings around campfires. Between the late 1990s and 2011, when funding was cut off, the Li-Kurlurluwa Language Centre (formerly Borroloola Language Centre) operated teaching of Garrwa and neighbouting languages in Borroloola and Robinson River, as well as encouraging speakers to use and maintain the language. Most Garrwa people below 50 do not speak the language; they interact with themselves and Garrwa speakers in Kriol, which speakers of Garrwa mix into their language when conversing among each other.

== Phonology ==
=== Vowels ===
Vowel length is not phonemic in Garrwa.

	Front	Back
High	i	u
Low	a	

=== Consonants ===
Orthographic equivalents, where different from IPA, are in ⟨angle brackets⟩.

	Bilabial	Alveolar	Alveolo- palatal	Velar
Stop	b	d	ɟ ⟨j⟩	k
Nasal	m	n	ɲ ⟨ny⟩	ŋ ⟨ng⟩
Lateral		l	(ʎ ⟨ly⟩)	
Approximant	(w)	ɹ ⟨r⟩	j ⟨y⟩	
Trill		r ⟨rr⟩		

No voicing distinction exists in Garrwa. Word-medially, all consonants are voiced.
