= Limmen Bight River =

Limmen Bight
- Location of the Limmen Bight River mouth in the Northern Territory

Location
- Country: Australia
- Territory: Northern Territory

Physical characteristics
- Source: Favenc Range
  - location: Australia
- Mouth: Limmen Bight
  - location: Gulf of Carpentaria, Australia
  - coordinates: 15°11′41″S 135°37′9″E
- Basin size: 15,938 km^{2} (6,154 sq mi)
- Discharge
  - average: 36.8 m^{3}/s (1,300 cu ft/s)

The Limmen Bight River is a river in the Northern Territory, Australia.

The headwaters rise at the base of the Favenc Range near O.T. Downs and Broadmere Stations. It then flows in a northerly direction, with many smaller tributaries feeding the river which forms a series of braided channels across the plains. It flows past Sculthorpe Pound and through Limmen Gate hemmed to the east by the Tawallah Range. It continues through Limmen National Park past the Four Archers near Burketown Crossing and eventually discharges in the Limmen Bight in the Gulf of Carpentaria. Fifteen tributaries join the river including October Creek, Balbirni Creek, Lansen Creek, Crooked Creek, Tyangkulta Creek, Cox River and Nathan River. It also flows through a large permanent billabong, Broadmere waterhole.

The catchment occupies an area of 15,938 square kilometres (6,154 sq mi) and is situated between the Roper River and Towns River catchments to the north and west, the McArthur River catchment to the south and the Rosie River catchment to the east. The river has a mean annual outflow of 1,160 gigalitres (1.517×10^{9} cu yd),

The river's estuary, which occupies an area of 62.1 square kilometres (24 sq mi) of open water, is in near pristine condition. The tide-dominated delta has multiple channels and is surrounded by an area of 21.2 square kilometres (8 sq mi) covered with mangroves.

The river was named after the Limmen Bight which it discharges into. The bight was named by the explorer Abel Tasman in 1644 after his ship, Limmen.

== See also ==
- List of rivers of Australia § Northern Territory
