= Wollogorang Important Bird Area =

Important Bird Area in Northern Territory, Australia

Coordinates: 17°29′20″S 137°50′20″E

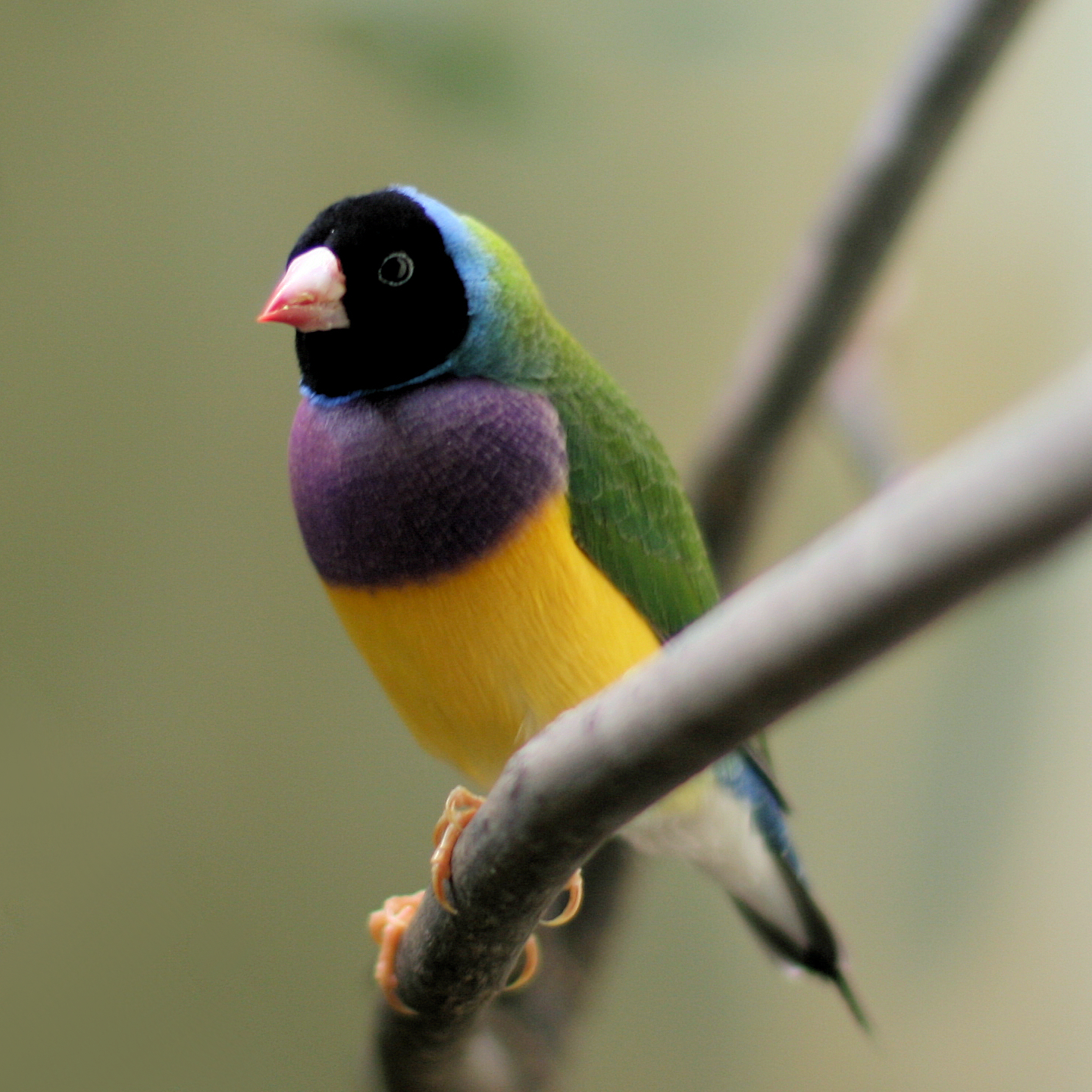
The IBA supports small numbers of Gouldian finches

The Wollogorang Important Bird Area is a 726 km^{2} tract of land straddling the border between the Northern Territory and Queensland in northern Australia.

== Description ==
The site comprises a small part of the cattle station, Wollogorang Station, in the far north-east of the Northern Territory, extending into north-west Queensland. It is an isolated area of highly dissected topography, with some 50 km of sandstone escarpment carrying savanna woodland, and with small pockets of monsoon vine thicket rainforest in sheltered gorges. The richest and best developed monsoon rainforest patches in the Gulf Falls and Uplands bioregion, they have a collective area of 860 ha though most individual patches are less than 10 ha. The region experiences a tropical monsoon climate with warm, dry winters and hot, humid summers; mean maximum temperatures range from 29 °C in June to 38 °C in November, with a mean annual rainfall of 960 mm.

== Birds ==
The site has been identified as an Important Bird Area (IBA) by BirdLife International because it contains the only population of Carpentarian grasswrens in the Northern Territory. Other birds with significant populations in the IBA include sandstone shrike-thrushes and white-browed robins. Small numbers of endangered Gouldian finches are also present.

== Other animals ==
The rugged sandstone ranges of Wollogorang support the only surviving population of critically endangered Carpentarian rock rats as well as rock-haunting ringtail possums, short-eared rock-wallabies, sandstone dibblers and Mertens' water monitors.
