= Port McArthur Tidal Wetlands System =

Coordinates: 15°53′42″S 136°46′29″E

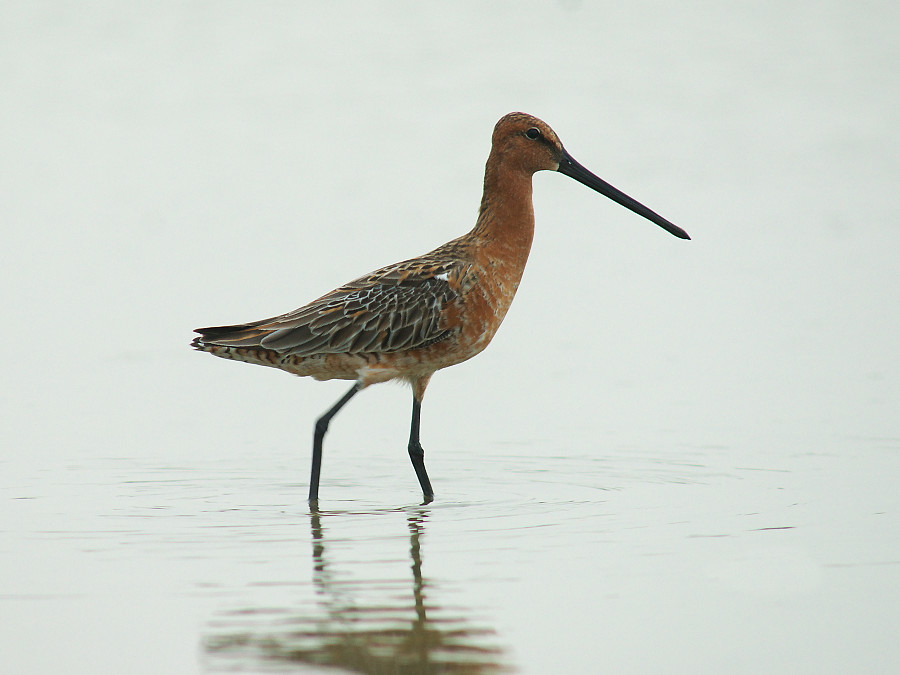
The wetlands are important for Asian dowitchers

The Port McArthur Tidal Wetlands System comprises a 994 km^{2} tract of tidal wetlands on the south-west coast of the Gulf of Carpentaria in the Northern Territory of Australia. The land extends along the coast opposite the Sir Edward Pellew Group of Islands, incorporating the estuaries of the McArthur and Wearyan Rivers. It is an important site for waders, or shorebirds.

== Description ==
The site lies partly on traditionally owned Aboriginal land and partly on the Bing Bong, Manangoora and Greenbank pastoral leases. The intertidal mudflats are up to 5 km in width and, at low tide, join up with those of South-West Island.

== Birds ==
The site has been identified by BirdLife International as an Important Bird Area (IBA) because the mudflats have supported over 1% of the world populations of grey-tailed tattlers, eastern curlews and great knots, as well as moderate numbers of Asian dowitchers. Other wader species recorded in substantial numbers include curlew sandpipers, marsh sandpipers and black-tailed godwits. Great-billed herons occur in greater densities than recorded elsewhere in the Northern Territory. Small numbers of beach stone-curlews are present. Little terns breed at sites along the coast. There are at least two large waterbird breeding colonies containing over 3000 egrets, cormorants and pied herons. Non-waterbird species include white-gaped honeyeaters and canary white-eyes.
