= Waanyi language =

Extinct Australian Aboriginal language

Wanyi
- Waanji
- Native to: Australia
- Region: Northern Territory, Queensland
- Ethnicity: Waanyi
- Native speakers: 16 (2016)
- Language family: Garrwan: Wanyi

Language codes
- ISO 639-3: wny
- Glottolog: wany1247
- AIATSIS: G23
- ELP: Waanyi

Waanyi, also spelt Wanyi, Wanji or Waanji, is an endangered Australian Aboriginal language spoken by the Waanyi people of the lower gulf area of Northern Queensland, Australia. Although earlier thought to be extinct, as of the 2016 Australian census there were 16 speakers of the language. This was down from the recorded peak of 40 in the 2011 Australian census.

The language region includes the western parts of Lawn Hill Creek and Nicholson River, from about the boundary between the Northern Territory and Queensland, westwards towards Alexandria station, Doomadgee, and Nicholson River. It includes the local government area of the Aboriginal Shire of Doomadgee.

Words and phrases from this language are used by novelist Alexis Wright in her 2013 novel, The Swan Book.

== Phonology ==
=== Consonants ===
Consonants
| | Peripheral | | Coronal | |
| | Labial | Velar | Apical | Palatal |
|---|---|---|---|---|
| Plosive | b | k | d | ɟ |
| Nasal | m | ŋ | n | ɲ |
| Lateral | | | l | ʎ |
| Tap | | | ɾ | |
| Glide | w | | ɻ | j |

=== Vowels ===
Vowels
| | Front | Central | Back |
|---|---|---|---|
| High | i iː | | u uː |
| Low | | a aː | |

Phonemic long vowels are rare.
