= Wilingura =

Indigenous people from the Northern Territory

The Wilingura otherwise known as the Wilangarra, were an indigenous Australian people of the Northern Territory.

== Country ==
The Wilingura inhabited the land between the Cox River and Nutwood Downs. Norman Tindale estimated their territory as covering some 7,500 square miles (19,000 km^{2}), taking in the Strangways River and the upper Hodgson River, and running west to the vicinity of Birdum (Pine Creek).

== Alternative names ==
- Willongera
- Leewillungarra
- Willangan
- Wilungwara
- Wilinggura

== Sources ==
- Basedow, Herbert (1907). "Anthropological notes on the Western Coastal tribes of the Northern Territory of South Australia". Transactions of the Royal Society of South Australia. 31. Adelaide: 1–62.
- Dickson, Greg (2015). Marra and Kriol: the loss and maintenance of knowledge across a language shift boundary (PhD thesis). Australian National University.
- "Map of Cox River, NT". Digital Atlas Pty Limited.
- "Map of Nutwood Downs, NT". Digital Atlas Pty Limited.
- Spencer, Sir Baldwin; Gillen, Francis J. (1904). Northern Tribes of Central Australia (PDF). Macmillan Publishers.
- Spencer, Baldwin (1914). Native tribes of the Northern Territory of Australia (PDF). London: Macmillan Publishers.
- Stretton, W. G. (1893). "Customs, rites and superstitions of the aboriginal tribes of the Gulf of Carpentaria" (PDF). Transactions of the Royal Society of South Australia. 17: 227–253. Archived from the original (PDF) on 21 January 2018.
- Tindale, Norman Barnett (1974). "Wilingura(NT)". Aboriginal Tribes of Australia: Their Terrain, Environmental Controls, Distribution, Limits, and Proper Names. Australian National University. ISBN 978-0-708-10741-6.
