= Wollogorang Station =

Pastoral lease in the Northern Territory and Queensland, Australia

Coordinates: 17.211°S 137.948°E

Location in Northern Territory

Wollogorang Station is a pastoral lease that operates as a cattle station straddling the border the Northern Territory and Queensland.

== Location ==
The property is situated approximately 124 kilometres (77 mi) north west of Doomadgee and 180 kilometres (112 mi) west of Burketown. The homestead overlooks Settlement Creek. It has approximately 50 miles (80 km) of frontage onto the Gulf of Carpentaria.

The property is bordered by the Pungalina-Seven Emu Sanctuary and Calvert Hills Station to the west, the Gulf of Carpentaria to the north, the Queensland border to the east and the Waanyi-Garawa Aboriginal Land Trust to the south.

== Description ==
Several watercourses flow through the property including Branch Creek, Settlement Creek, Gold Creek and Running Creek.

Wollogorang occupies an area of 7,057 square kilometres (2,725 sq mi). and is able to carry more than 40,000 head of cattle.

It contains the Wollogorang Important Bird Area.

== History ==
The name Wollogorang in the local Indigenous Australian peoples language means Happy running waters; the name comes from Settlement Creek which runs through the property.

The first Europeans to visit the area was the Ludwig Leichhardt expedition from Queensland to Port Essington in 1845. The lease for the landholding was established in 1881 by the Chisholm family who had come from Wollogorang House near Goulburn. Wollogarang/Wollogorang is a name associated with the Chisholms back to the 1820s, long before their settling of this property. Initially established and stocked in 1883 the property boasts the longest continuous occupation of any property in the Northern Territory as, unlike others, it has never been abandoned since it was first settled. The Anning family purchased the property in 1895 for £3000 after the station manager, Robert Henry Shadforth, had been speared by Aboriginal people.

Copper was discovered on the property in 1899.

The Annings sold the property in about 1906.

An American, A.L. Standberry of Arizona bought the station in 1966.

However, his term was short, as long term owner Paul Zlotkowski first bought the property in the late 1960s. Zlotkowski sold it a few years later to businessman Bela Csidei. Later, after the businessman was arrested on drugs charges in 1978, Zlotkowski bought the property back from its liquidator.

In 2007 a Filipino worker, Pablo Balading, arrived in Australia on a 457 visa to commence work on Amungee Mungee Station. Instead he was taken to Wollogorang where he worked as a farm hand. Balading was harassed by his Australian workmates until he was killed when he fell from a vehicle speeding down a dirt road on the property. He died shortly afterwards and his family was left without any compensation or information on to what had caused his death. The company was fined for not providing a safe workplace for this incident three years later.

The owner in 2006 was still Paul Zlotkowski who had placed it on the market for A$40 million in 2008. However, he did not succeed in selling the station until 2015.

The buyer in 2015 was Chinese businessman Xingfa Ma. In 2020 it was bought by the McMillan family of Cloncurry.

== Climate ==
Climate data for Wollogorang, elevation 60 m (200 ft), (1991–2015 normals, extremes 1974–2015)
Month	Jan	Feb	Mar	Apr	May	Jun	Jul	Aug	Sep	Oct	Nov	Dec	Year
Record high °C (°F)	43.6 (110.5)	41.5 (106.7)	42.5 (108.5)	40.5 (104.9)	37.7 (99.9)	36.6 (97.9)	35.4 (95.7)	38.0 (100.4)	40.9 (105.6)	43.1 (109.6)	45.0 (113.0)	46.2 (115.2)	46.2 (115.2)
Mean daily maximum °C (°F)	34.8 (94.6)	34.5 (94.1)	34.5 (94.1)	33.8 (92.8)	31.4 (88.5)	29.1 (84.4)	29.4 (84.9)	31.3 (88.3)	34.9 (94.8)	36.8 (98.2)	37.3 (99.1)	36.6 (97.9)	33.7 (92.6)
Mean daily minimum °C (°F)	24.3 (75.7)	24.1 (75.4)	22.8 (73.0)	19.7 (67.5)	15.8 (60.4)	12.3 (54.1)	11.3 (52.3)	12.2 (54.0)	15.9 (60.6)	19.8 (67.6)	22.4 (72.3)	24.2 (75.6)	18.7 (65.7)
Record low °C (°F)	18.5 (65.3)	15.2 (59.4)	14.0 (57.2)	7.7 (45.9)	4.1 (39.4)	1.8 (35.2)	0.1 (32.2)	1.4 (34.5)	5.2 (41.4)	10.0 (50.0)	12.4 (54.3)	16.0 (60.8)	0.1 (32.2)
Average rainfall mm (inches)	294.9 (11.61)	223.9 (8.81)	138.2 (5.44)	42.8 (1.69)	7.9 (0.31)	2.2 (0.09)	0.2 (0.01)	0.4 (0.02)	3.4 (0.13)	26.4 (1.04)	79.0 (3.11)	153.0 (6.02)	972.3 (38.28)
Average rainy days (≥ 1.0 mm)	12.9	12.7	7.7	2.8	0.7	0.3	0.1	0.1	0.4	1.9	5.7	9.1	54.4
Source: Australian Bureau of Meteorology

== See also ==
- List of ranches and stations
