= Garawan languages =

Language family of northern Australia

Garawan
- Yanyi, Garrwan
- Geographic distribution: Northern Territory and Queensland
- Linguistic classification: Macro-Pama–Nyungan?: Greater Pama–Nyungan?; Garawan
- Subdivisions: Garawa–Gunindiri; Waanyi

Language codes
- Glottolog: garr1260
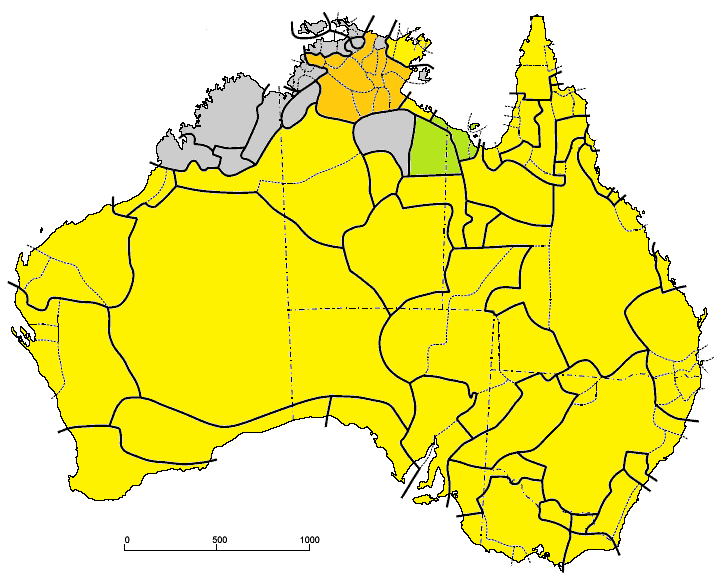
- Garawan and Tangkic (green). Garawan is the group inland.

The Garawan languages (Garrwan), or Yanyi, are a small language family of Australian Aboriginal languages currently spoken in northern Australia.

The languages are:

- Garawan
  - Garawa (Garrwa, north)
  - Waanyi (Wanji, south)
  - Gunindiri † (Kurnindirri, southwest)

Gunindiri is almost entirely unknown.

Garawan may be related to the Pama–Nyungan languages, though this is not accepted in Bowern 2011. The languages are close: Dixon (2002) says that it should be straightforward to reconstruct proto-Garawa–Wanji.

== Vocabulary ==
Capell (1940) lists the following basic vocabulary items:

gloss	Garama	Waneiga
man	gadu	jäba
woman	balŋun	ludju
head	bɛlbid	gada
eye	gamal	milba
nose	djimu	mulju
mouth	dädbi	lira
tongue	djɛman	djälaṉ
stomach	maːda	miälu
bone	munu	gidji
blood	gumuluŋ	djugän
kangaroo	ŋalmuŋgu	maɭu
opossum	jaːɭ	djaŋana
crow	waːg	djäŋilga
fly	moːl	ŋurin
sun	ŋuŋa	wanda
moon	mɛrg	girindji
fire	ḏuŋgu	waɽu
smoke	wanag	gundjuru
water	goɽa	gabi
