= Nicholson River (Queensland) =

River in Northern Territory and Queensland, Australia

Nicholson
- Location of Nicholson River mouth in Queensland

Location
- Country: Australia
- Territory: Northern Territory

Physical characteristics
- Source: Barkly Tableland
  - location: west of China Wall, Northern Territory
  - elevation: 240 m (790 ft)
- Mouth: Gulf of Carpentaria
  - location: Pasco Inlet, Queensland
  - coordinates: 17°30′21″S 139°36′14″E
  - elevation: 0 m (0 ft)
- Length: 725 km (450 mi)
- Basin size: 53,200 km^{2} (20,500 sq mi)

The Nicholson River is a river in the Northern Territory and the state of Queensland, Australia.

The Aboriginal mission at Doomadgee was also historically referred to as located on Nicholson River in some sources.

== Course and features ==
The headwaters of the river rise at the western end of China Wall on the Barkly Tableland, in the Northern Territory and head in a south easterly direction. The river then heads due east and crosses the border into the northwest region of Queensland near Nudjabarra across mostly uninhabited plains. It continues east across the Shadforth Plain and past the Aboriginal community of Doomadgee. The river then veers north near the Tiranna Roadhouse across Hann Crossing and past Escott, just west of Burketown where it is joined by its main tributary the Gregory River. The river continues north and later discharges into Pasco Inlet and the Gulf of Carpentaria. The ephemeral Nicholson has a length of approximately 390 kilometres (242 mi).

The drainage basin of the river occupies an area of 53,200 square kilometres (20,541 sq mi) of which an area of 15,733 square kilometres (6,075 sq mi) is in the Northern Territory and the rest in Queensland. The watershed is wedged between the watersheds for the Robinson River and Settlement Creek watersheds to the north, the Barkly River catchment to the south and the Leichhardt River catchment to the east.

The river had a mean annual discharge of 2,237 gigalitres (4.92×10^{11} imp gal; 5.91×10^{11} US gal).

== History ==
The traditional owners of the area are the Yukulta / Ganggalidda Waanyi, Maga-Kutana, Wakabunga, Nguburinji and Mingin peoples who have inhabited the region for thousands of years.

The river is called Ganalanga is the Waanyi language (also known as Wanyi, Wanyee, Wanee, Waangyee, Wonyee, Garawa, and Wanji), an Australian Aboriginal language of the Gulf Country. The language region includes the western parts of Lawn Hill Creek and Nicholson River, from about the boundary between the Northern Territory and Queensland, westwards towards Alexandria Station, Doomadgee, and Nicholson River. It includes the local government area of the Aboriginal Shire of Doomadgee.

The explorer, Ludwig Leichhardt, passed through the area during his 1845 overland expedition from Moreton Bay in Queensland to Port Essington in the Northern Territory. Leichhardt named the river for Dr William Alleyne Nicholson, of Bristol in England. In his diary Leichhardt wrote that Nicholson's "generous friendship had not only enabled me to devote my time to the study of the natural sciences, but to come out to Australia...".

== Flooding ==
The river is often inundated by heavy rainfall following cyclones that cross the catchment from either the Coral Sea or from the Gulf of Carpentaria. Record flood events occurred in 1971 through the catchment with lesser floods in 2000, 2004 and 2009 all of which led to road closures in the area.

On 7–9 March 2023 up to 500mm of rain fell in 48 hours across the catchment, leading to record flooding. At Doomadgee the river rose to 8 metres, eclipsing the 1971 record.

== See also ==
- List of rivers of Australia § Northern Territory
- List of rivers of Australia § Queensland
