= McArthur River =

River in Northern Territory, Australia

McArthur
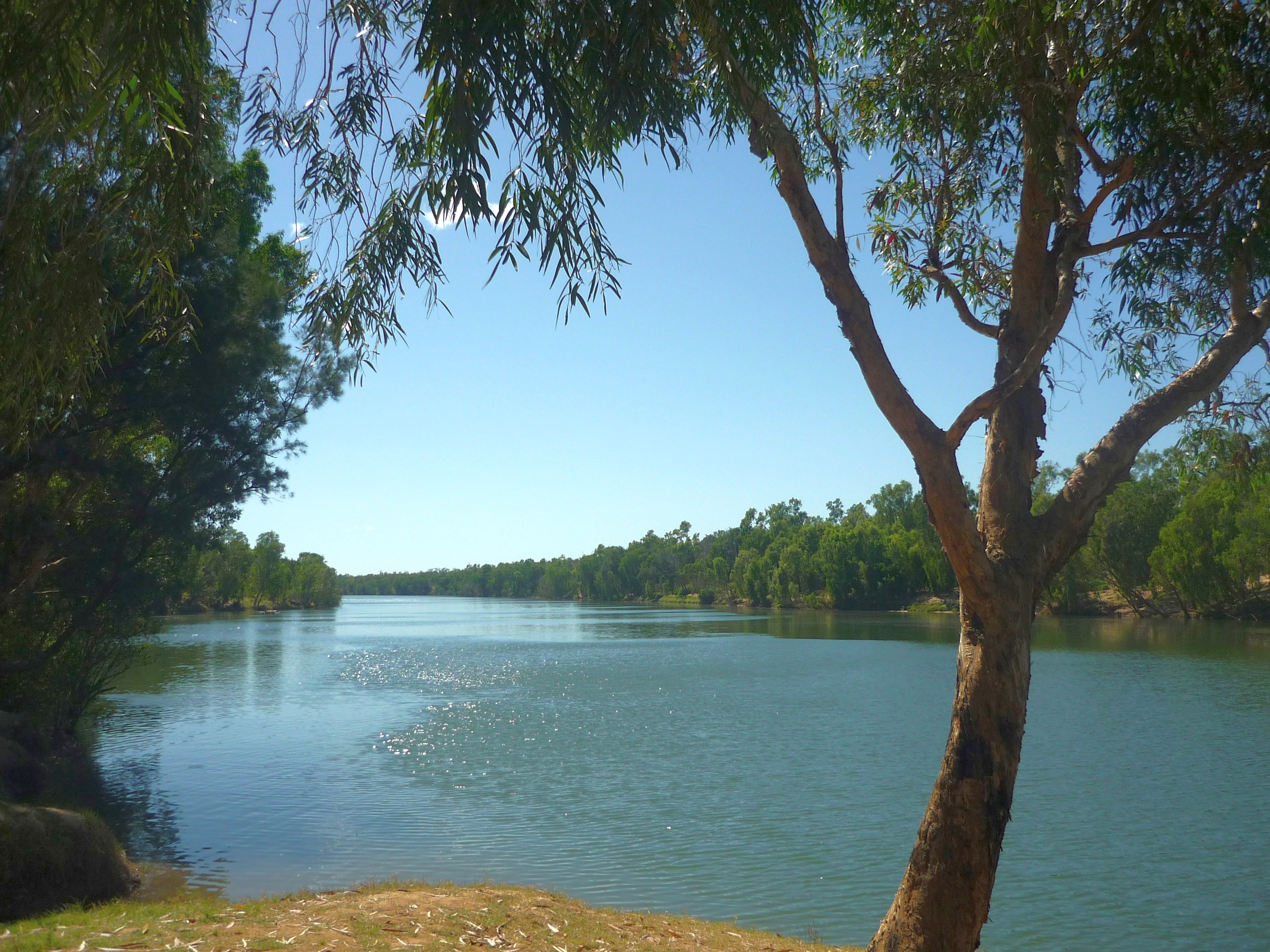
- McArthur River at Borroloola, 2011

- Location in Northern Territory, Australia
- Etymology: James McArthur

Location
- Country: Australia
- Territory: Northern Territory
- Region: Katherine Region

Physical characteristics
- Source: Barkly Tableland
  - location: east of Elliott
  - elevation: 234 m (768 ft)
- Mouth: Gulf of Carpentaria
  - location: east of Borroloola
  - coordinates: 15°54′S 136°40′E
  - elevation: 0 m (0 ft)
- Length: 521 km (324 mi)
- Basin size: 20,010 km^{2} (7,730 sq mi)
- Discharge
  - average: 103.6 m^{3}/s (3,660 cu ft/s)

The McArthur River is a river in the Northern Territory of Australia which flows into the Gulf of Carpentaria at Port McArthur, opposite the Sir Edward Pellew Group of Islands. The river was named by Ludwig Leichhardt while he explored the area in 1845. He named the River after James MacArthur and the MacArthur family of Camden, who were enthusiastic supporters of his expedition. The McArthur River has significance for the local Aboriginal communities, who use it for fishing and other traditional activities.

== Description ==
The McArthur River basin covers 20,010 km^{2} (7,726 sq mi). The basin is situated between the Rosie River catchment to the north, the Limmen Bight River to the east, the Barkly River catchment to the south and the Robinson River catchment to the west. The mean annual runoff is 3,270,000 ML (115,000×10^{6} cu ft) per year. The headwaters of the rivers rise on the northern edge of the Barkly Tableland. Tributaries of the McArthur River include Tooganginie Creek, and the Kilgour and Clyde rivers.

The river has a long tidal estuary which extends inland to the town of Borroloola. The estuary is in near-pristine condition, and forms part of the Port McArthur Tidal Wetlands System Important Bird Area.

== McArthur River zinc mine expansion ==
In 2007, plans to expand the McArthur River zinc mine, one of the world's largest zinc mines, were halted by a decision of the Supreme Court of the Northern Territory. It was found that the approval of the expansion by Mines Minister Chris Natt was invalid. Traditional owners were concerned the proposal, which included a 5.5 km (3.4 mi) river diversion, had serious, long term and irreversible impacts.

In 2008, the case was heard by the Federal Court, which found that the expansion was illegal. In early 2009, the Federal Environment Minister Peter Garrett formally approved the mine's expansion. Garrett placed conditions on the project which aimed to reduce the impact on the freshwater sawfish and migratory birds.

== See also ==
- List of rivers of Australia § Northern Territory
