= Borroloola =

- Town
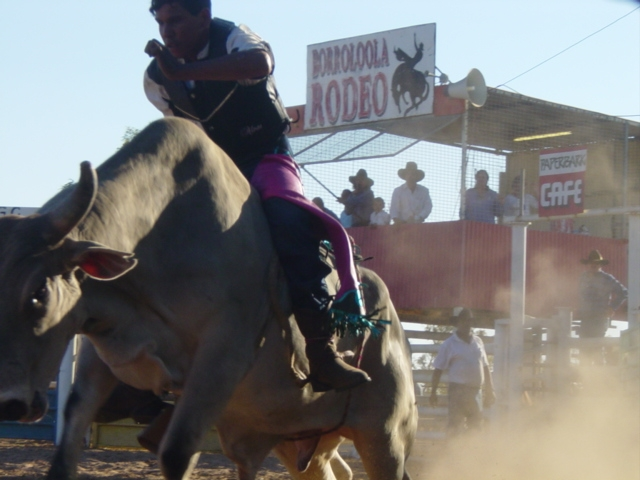
- The Borroloola rodeo is held in August each year

- Coordinates: 16°04′13″S 136°18′26″E
- Country: Australia
- State: Northern Territory
- LGA: Roper Gulf Region
- Location: 1,056 km (656 mi) SE of Darwin; 739 km (459 mi) SE of Katherine; 492 km (306 mi) W of Burketown (QLD); 387 km (240 mi) E of Daly Waters

Government
  - Territory electorate: Barkly
  - Federal division: Lingiari
- Elevation: 17 m (56 ft)

Population
  - Total: 755 (SAL 2021)
- Postcode: 0854
- Mean max temp: 33.7 °C (92.7 °F)
- Mean min temp: 19.6 °C (67.3 °F)
- Annual rainfall: 946.0 mm (37.24 in)

Borroloola (Garrwa: Burrulula) is a town in the Northern Territory of Australia. It is located on the McArthur River, about 50 km (31 mi) upstream from the Gulf of Carpentaria.

== Location ==
Borroloola lies on the traditional country of the Yanyuwa people was gudanji, on the coastal plain between the Barkly Tablelands and the Gulf of Carpentaria. Rivers that run from the Tablelands escarpment to the Gulf regularly flood in the wet season, making travel on the unsealed section of Highway One along the coastal plain to Queensland impossible. The rivers of this region have carved spectacular gorges through sandstone deposits in their upper reaches. The rivers and coastal areas are host to barramundi, earning Borroloola a reputation among sports fisherman, and also to the deadly saltwater crocodile. The region has little rain from May to September and is characterised by lightly treed Savanna grasslands.

== History ==
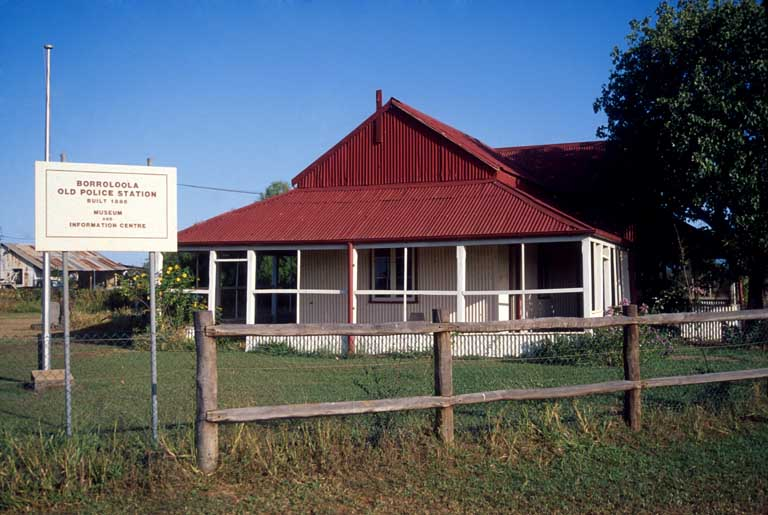
Borroloola's Historic Police Station

Garrwa (also known as Garawa) is a language of the Gulf region, taking in the localities of Borroloola and Westmoreland. The Garrwa language region takes in the landscape of the Roper Gulf Regional Council and the Doomadgee Shire Council. The Garrwa name for the town is Burrulula.

The 'Coast Track' follows the path of cattle drovers of the late 19th century as they moved herds from north-west Queensland to stock the new stations of the Northern Territory and the Kimberley. The drovers, in turn, followed a well-worn Aboriginal path. Tony Roberts writes how the local tribes went from almost total isolation from European Australians in 1870, to a decimated collection of displaced and defeated groups, over a single decade. Entire tribes such as the Wilangarra, including women, children and babies were massacred, and most adult males were killed, by police and quasi-police groups, and by drovers and station workers involved in the cattle droves of that era.

Borroloola was declared a town on 10 September 1885. In the local Indigenous languages of Yanyuwa, Garrwa, Marra, Gudanji and Binbingka, Borroloola would be written as Burrulula. The name belongs to a small lagoon just to the east of the present day caravan park. The name originally Borrolooloo, translates borrow women, name of the lagoon and associated with the Hill Kangaroo. It was at this site that the Hill Kangaroo Ancestral Being (Nangurrbuwala) danced his ceremonies. The white-barked gum trees in the area are said to be his body decorations as they flew from his body as he danced. Other Indigenous names in the area of Borroloola are Wurrarawala (Trig Hill) this hill is associated with the backbone of the Hill Kangaroo Ancestor. Bunubunu (Rocky Creek), this creek is associated with a File Snake Ancestor. Warralungku (The McArthur River Crossing) and Mabunji, a set of specific rocks at the McArthur River Crossing that carries the imprint of the Hill Kangaroo's tail and feet. The area of Borroloola belongs to members of the Rrumburriya clan.

A famous story about Borroloola concerns one (police) Corporal Power, who appealed to the Carnegie Trust for books to stock the town's library. He succeeded beyond his wildest dreams when some 3,000 volumes arrived, the courthouse their only suitable repository. Bill Harney recounts how by 1923, when he was involuntarily detained there, it had fallen into decay: he found Sue's Mysteries of Paris in shards, Plutarch in the lavatory of the Macarthur Hotel, and a "splendid edition of Shakespeare" being used to light campfires. David Attenborough visited Borroloola in 1963 to film what became episode 2 of 'Quest Under Capricorn', the 8th and final series of the BBC's Zoo Quest expedition documentaries. He interviewed Irishman Jack Mulholland, then owner of the hotel. He described having joined the library having arrived at Borroloola one rainy season some years prior and read many books, including the complete set of works by W. W. Jacobs.

In 1977, the Yanyuwa people were the first to successfully lodge a claim under the new Federal Aboriginal Land Rights (Northern Territory) Act 1976 over Borroloola and the Pellew Islands. The claim was finally resolved in 2015. A second land claim in 2002 saw the remaining islands in the area also handed back.

Yanyuwa man John Kundereri Moriarty, a recipient of the Order of Australia (AM) and a UNESCO Achievement Award, was born in Borroloola. Moriarty is a co-founder of the Moriarty Foundation, which works for the development of Aboriginal families and communities.

== Demographics ==
At the 2016 census, Borroloola had a population of 871.

- Aboriginal and Torres Strait Islander people made up 76.1% of the population.
- 89.2% of people were born in Australia and 79.6% of people spoke only English at home.
- The most common responses for religion were No Religion 49.7% and Other Protestant 18.2%.

== Facilities and attractions ==
The King Ash Bay fishing club is situated on the McArthur River about 40 km downstream (north-east) from Borroloola by river, just over 40 km from Borroloola by road. Their boat ramp provides access to the mangrove-lined waterways of the McArthur estuary and the Sir Edward Pellew Group of Islands in the Gulf of Carpentaria. The largely self-contained village houses a small permanent population during the wet season, but numbers swell as tourists, mostly retired and semi-retired, arrive in April and May to enjoy the mild dry season weather. The Fishing Classic competition, held over the Easter weekend each year (weather and road access permitting), marks the end of the wet season.

The Borroloola Community Education Centre (CEC) contains a FAFT ('Families as First Teachers') Centre, preschool, primary school and secondary school. The Borroloola CEC has a combined staff of more than 25. The staff is composed of mostly out-of-state teachers and local indigenous teacher aides. The CEC enjoys an average attendance of 100 students but has far more listed on its rolls. Two of the problems facing the school are intermittent student attendance and a high staff turnover. The current Acting Principal is Stephen Pelizzo, who took over the school in 2017.

Borroloola has a health centre that can provide basic services.

=== Waralungku Arts ===
Waralungku Arts, an Aboriginal-owned and -controlled arts centre in Borroloola, was established in 2003.

== Economy ==
The main economic sectors in Borroloola are tourism, mining, and art. The controversial McArthur River mine, one of the world's largest zinc, lead and silver mines, is located about 70 km from Borroloola. As of 2006, 42 businesses were registered in the town.

== Transport ==
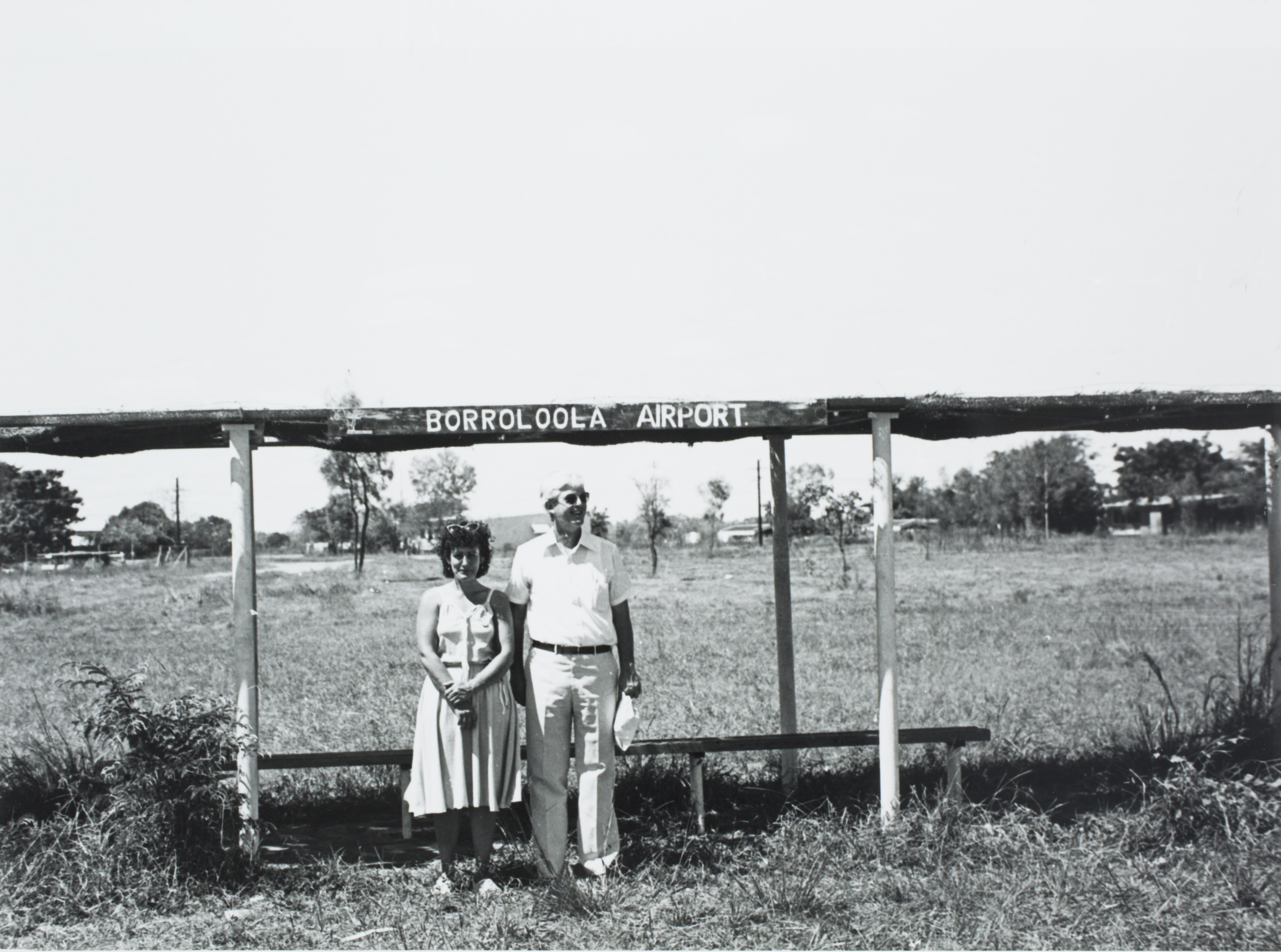
Borroloola Airport

The Borroloola Airport has a 1,149-metre long runway at an elevation of 55 feet (16.8 metres). The airport can be very busy during the day and the occasional Careflight services the town during the night. One single-engine Cessna 210 aircraft from Katherine Aviation is based at the airport permanently. It frequently services the region with chartered and government flights to towns and communities such as Robinson River, McArthur River Mine and Katherine, as well as offering scenic flights to the nearby Sir Edward Pellew Islands and surrounding attractions. There are refuelling services for both Avgas and Avtur at the airport and limited parking areas. The runway is lit up at night by solar-powered lights.

The Carpentaria Highway runs west from Borroloola to Daly Waters. The Savannah Way runs east from Borroloola to Normanton. Both highways are part of Australia's Highway 1, although large portions of the Savannah Way are unsealed.

Four bus services operate between Katherine and Borroloola weekly (two of which continue to Darwin).

== Climate ==
Borroloola has a tropical savanna climate with the 3 distinct seasons of the Northern Territory, the wet season, the dry season and the build-up season. Extreme temperatures have ranged from 2.7 °C (36.9 °F) to 44.7 °C (112.5 °F).

Climate data for Borroloola, elevation 16 m (52 ft), (1994–2020 normals, extremes 1987–present)
Month	Jan	Feb	Mar	Apr	May	Jun	Jul	Aug	Sep	Oct	Nov	Dec	Year
Record high °C (°F)	44.2 (111.6)	42.7 (108.9)	43.3 (109.9)	41.5 (106.7)	37.4 (99.3)	35.6 (96.1)	36.2 (97.2)	37.7 (99.9)	40.7 (105.3)	43.0 (109.4)	44.2 (111.6)	44.7 (112.5)	44.7 (112.5)
Mean daily maximum °C (°F)	34.4 (93.9)	34.2 (93.6)	34.1 (93.4)	34.2 (93.6)	32.4 (90.3)	30.4 (86.7)	30.5 (86.9)	32.1 (89.8)	35.1 (95.2)	36.9 (98.4)	37.7 (99.9)	36.7 (98.1)	34.1 (93.3)
Mean daily minimum °C (°F)	24.9 (76.8)	24.6 (76.3)	23.4 (74.1)	20.3 (68.5)	15.9 (60.6)	12.9 (55.2)	12.0 (53.6)	13.5 (56.3)	17.5 (63.5)	21.3 (70.3)	23.9 (75.0)	25.2 (77.4)	19.6 (67.3)
Record low °C (°F)	19.1 (66.4)	18.4 (65.1)	14.9 (58.8)	9.0 (48.2)	5.3 (41.5)	2.7 (36.9)	3.1 (37.6)	5.1 (41.2)	7.8 (46.0)	13.3 (55.9)	13.2 (55.8)	18.2 (64.8)	2.7 (36.9)
Average rainfall mm (inches)	218.8 (8.61)	223.4 (8.80)	153.1 (6.03)	59.5 (2.34)	7.8 (0.31)	1.7 (0.07)	0.5 (0.02)	0.5 (0.02)	3.4 (0.13)	13.5 (0.53)	68.9 (2.71)	131.4 (5.17)	882.5 (34.74)
Average rainy days (≥ 1.0 mm)	12.2	11.9	10.2	3.7	0.7	0.3	0.1	0.1	0.3	1.3	4.1	8.5	53.4
Source: Australian Bureau of Meteorology

== See also ==
- Cape Crawford, Northern Territory
- Numby Numby/Ngambingambi sinkhole
