= Cyclone Kathy =

Australian region cyclone in 1984

Severe Tropical Cyclone Kathy
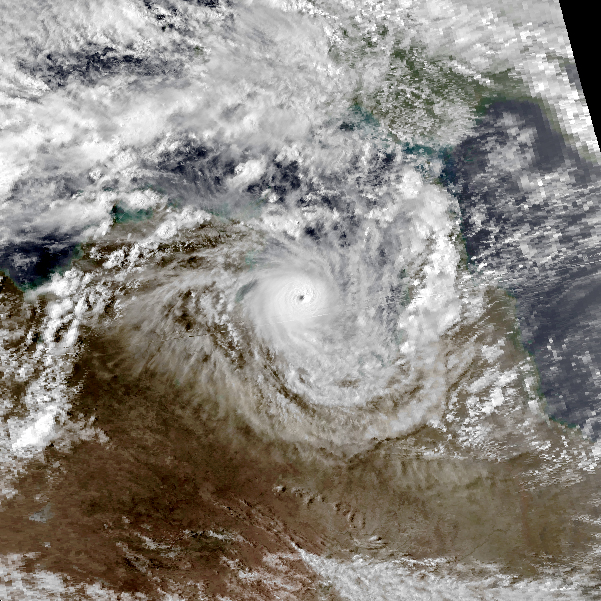
- Cyclone Kathy near peak intensity on 22 March over the Gulf of Carpentaria

Meteorological history
- Formed: 16 March 1984
- Dissipated: 23 March 1984

Category 5 severe tropical cyclone
- 10-minute sustained (BOM)
- Highest winds: 205 km/h (125 mph)
- Highest gusts: 280 km/h (175 mph)
- Lowest pressure: 916 hPa (mbar); 27.05 inHg

Category 4-equivalent tropical cyclone
- 1-minute sustained (SSHWS/JTWC)
- Highest winds: 250 km/h (155 mph)

Overall effects
- Fatalities: 1 direct
- Damage: $11.4 million (1984 USD)
- Areas affected: Far North Queensland; Northern Territory
- IBTrACS
- Part of the 1983–84 Australian region cyclone season

Severe Tropical Cyclone Kathy was a powerful tropical cyclone that devastated the Sir Edward Pellew Group of Islands in March 1984. Originating from a tropical low off the southern coast of Papua New Guinea. Tracking westward, the system attained gale-force winds by 18 March before striking the Cape York Peninsula. After crossing the area, Kathy entered the Gulf of Carpentaria where environmental conditions favoured significant development. On 22 March, the storm attained its peak intensity as a Category 5 severe tropical cyclone (Australian tropical cyclone intensity scale) with ten-minute sustained winds of 205 km/h (125 mph). By this time, the storm had been tracking towards the southwest and struck the Sir Edward Pellew Group of Islands later on 22 March before moving over the Australian mainland as a slightly weaker system. Once over land, Kathy rapidly degraded, losing gale-force winds within 24 hours; the storm dissipated over the Northern Territory on 24 March.

Moving through the Pellew Islands as a powerful cyclone, Kathy generated a maximum storm surge of 4.2 m (14 ft) and winds exceeding 232 km/h (144 mph). Offshore, 20 vessels were affected, one of which sank and resulted in the death of its captain. In mainland Australia, the system struck a relatively sparsely populated area, with only Borroloola being significantly impacted by the cyclone. Additionally, mangroves at along the McArthur River sustained substantial damage. Overall, losses from the storm were placed at A$12 million (A$30.5 million 2011 AUD; US$24.1 million 2011 USD). Following its usage, the name Kathy was retired and will never be used again to name an Australian cyclone.

== Meteorological history ==
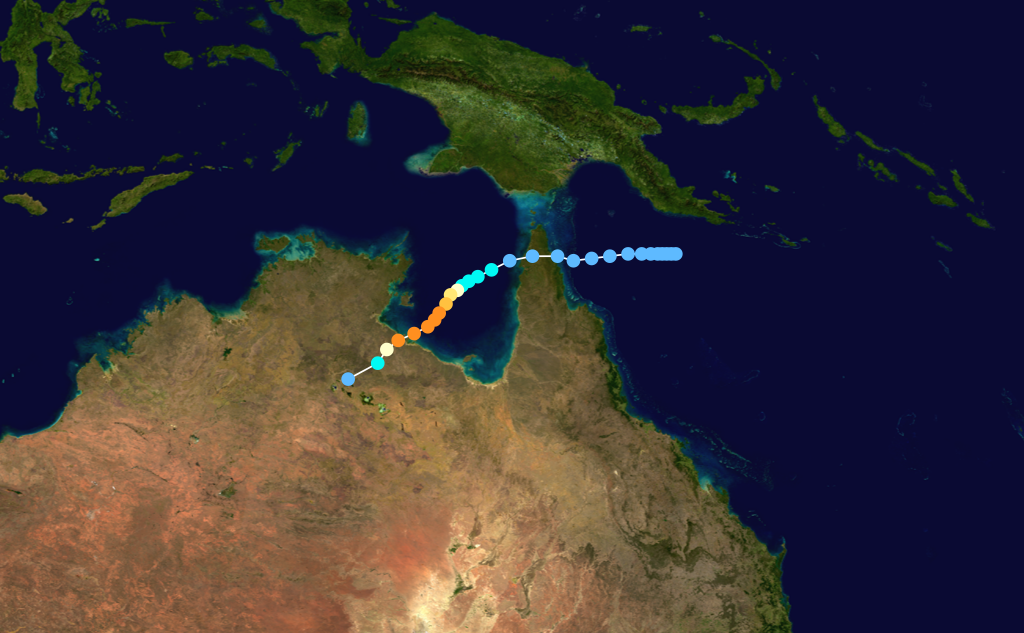
Map plotting the storm's track and intensity, according to the Saffir–Simpson scale Map key Saffir–Simpson scale Tropical depression (≤38 mph, ≤62 km/h) Tropical storm (39–73 mph, 63–118 km/h) Category 1 (74–95 mph, 119–153 km/h) Category 2 (96–110 mph, 154–177 km/h) Category 3 (111–129 mph, 178–208 km/h) Category 4 (130–156 mph, 209–251 km/h) Category 5 (≥157 mph, ≥252 km/h) Unknown Storm type Tropical cyclone Subtropical cyclone Extratropical cyclone, remnant low, tropical disturbance, or monsoon depression

On 16 March 1984, the Bureau of Meteorology began monitoring a tropical low off the southern coast of Papua New Guinea for possible development into a tropical cyclone. Over the following day, the system quickly developed and attained gale-force winds as it neared the Cape York Peninsula. Attaining a pressure of 990 hPa (mbar; 29.23 inHg), the weak system made landfall just north of Weipa, Queensland on 19 March before losing strength. Though already considered a tropical cyclone for two days by the Bureau, the Joint Typhoon Warning Center (JTWC) issued their first advisory on the system just prior to its landfall; however, they considered it to be a tropical depression rather than a storm. After roughly 12 hours over land, a weakened Kathy emerged over the warm waters of the Gulf of Carpentaria on 20 March. Once over water, the JTWC classified the system as a tropical storm. Turning southwestward, the storm entered a region favoring significant development and soon began a period of rapid intensification.

Intensification took place through 22 March as convection deepened around Kathy's centre and a well-defined eye formed. The system reached its peak strength as a Category 5 severe tropical cyclone on the Australian tropical cyclone intensity scale with ten-minute sustained winds of 205 km/h (125 mph). Operational analysis of the storm indicated a minimum pressure of 920 hPa (mbar; 27.17 inHg); however, a reassessment in 2009 concluded that Kathy's pressure had been slightly lower, bottoming out at 916 hPa (mbar; 27.05 inHg). Additionally, the JTWC assessed the system to have been slightly stronger, estimating peak one-minute sustained winds at 250 km/h (155 mph). At this time, the storm was estimated to have a Dvorak technique rating of 7.0, equivalent to a Category 5 on the Saffir–Simpson hurricane scale;

As Cyclone Kathy neared the Australia coastline later on 22 March, it began to weaken as it interacted with land. Radar imagery depicted the system as having an eye 10.8 km (6.7 mi) in diameter. Roughly 5 hours after peaking, the storm passed directly over the Sir Edward Pellew Group of Islands, resulting in a degrading structure. Near midnight, the system weakened to a Category 4 cyclone and made landfall in a remote region near Borroloola. Based on a wind gust to sustained ratio of 1.4, Kathy was estimated to have moved onshore with winds between 165 and 185 km/h (105 and 115 mph). In the hours after landfall, Kathy rapid weakened, no longer retaining gale-force winds once 200 km (120 mi) away from the Gulf on 23 March. Later that day, the system turned south-westward and persisted for another 24 hours before dissipating.

== Impact ==
In Far North Queensland, Kathy brought moderate rainfall and strong winds to much of the region. No measurements from the centre of the storm were made, although a wind gust of 60 km/h (37 mph) was recorded in Batavia Downs, Queensland, about 55 km (34 mi) south-southeast of the cyclone. Between 18 and 21 March, a total of 126.7 mm (4.99 in) of rain fell near Batavia Downs. Due to the relatively low intensity of the storm, damage was minimal and mainly confined to trees.

Striking the Sir Edward Pellew Group of Islands as a high-end Category 4 cyclone, Kathy wrought significant damage in the region. A storm surge of 4.2 m (14 ft) struck Vanderlin Island, destroying much of the nesting ground for sea turtles. Winds were recorded up to 232 km/h (144 mph) on Centre Island before the station's anemometer failed. Several camps across the islands were destroyed. Offshore, 20 vessels were caught in the storm. One of these was the 23 m (75 ft) prawn trawler Lindeman which capsized off the coast of Skull Island on 23 March. A fisherman on board drowned, with his body discovered three days later washed up on Centre Island. Three other trawlers ran aground on Vanderlin Island. Losses sustained by the ships were placed at A$5 million. The only population center significantly affected by the storm was Borroloola, where moderate to severe damage took place. Of the 90 homes in the town, only 10 were left undamaged. In all, losses from the storm were placed at A$12 million.

Though a powerful storm, only light to moderate rains fell along the cyclone's path with totals generally less than 100 mm (3.9 in). The remnants, however, triggered thunderstorms near Tennant Creek that produced 325 mm (12.8 in) of rain in 24 hours. Reports indicate that several sea turtles and dugongs were washed up to 8 km (5.0 mi) inland by Kathy's surge. Along the mouth of the McArthur River, near where Kathy struck the mainland, the combination of severe winds and storm surge killed 80% (±20%) of the Rhizophoraceae mangrove trees in the region. Along the entire length of the river, 45% (±15.3%) of the Rhizophoraceae, Bruguiera and Ceriops as well as 18.5% (±11.4%) of the Exoecaria agallocha, Lumnitzera racemosa and Avicennia marina perished.

In the wake of the storm, Australian Prime Minister Bob Hawke promised residents of Borroloola that they would receive all possible help from the government. About 400 people in the town were left homeless by Cyclone Kathy. By 25 March, a Royal Australian Air Force aircraft was sent to the region carrying emergency supplies for sheltering displaced persons. Two patrol boats from the Royal Australian Navy were also sent to assist in relief efforts. One brought fuel and medical supplies and the other assisted trawlers set adrift or grounded by the storm.

== See also ==
- List of retired Australian region cyclone names
