= 2015–16 Australian region cyclone season =

Tropical cyclone season

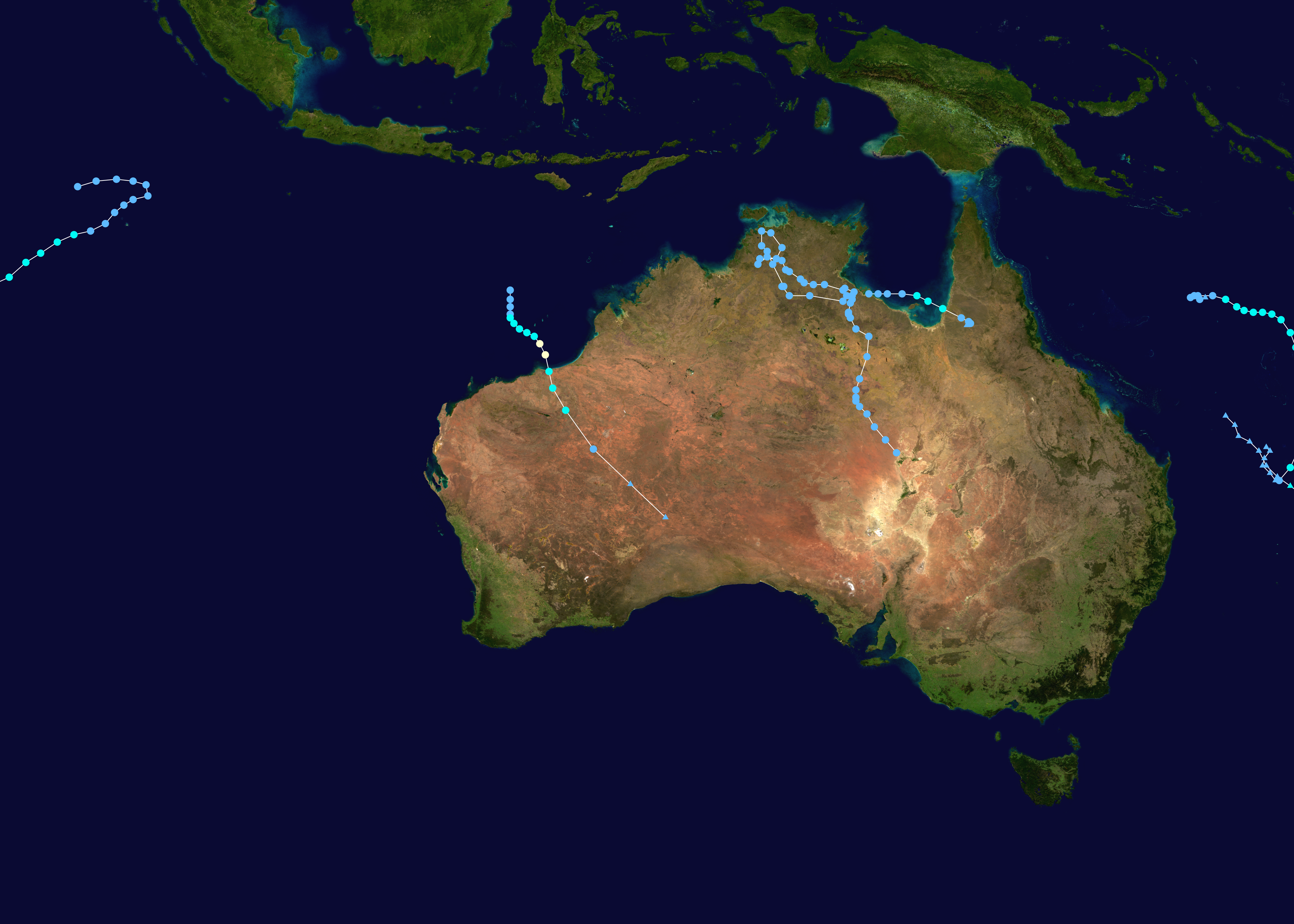
- Season summary map

Seasonal boundaries
- First system formed: 17 December 2015
- Last system dissipated: 16 March 2016

Strongest storm
- Name: Stan
  - Maximum winds: 100 km/h (65 mph) (10-minute sustained)
  - Lowest pressure: 980 hPa (mbar)

Seasonal statistics
- Tropical lows: 11 (Note: Number of tropical lows and tropical cyclones excludes Tropical Cyclone Raquel, which was considered to have been a part of the 2014–15 season.)
- Tropical cyclones: 3 (record low)
- Severe tropical cyclones: 0 (record low)
- Total fatalities: None
- Total damage: Unknown

Related articles
- 2015–16 South-West Indian Ocean cyclone season; 2015–16 South Pacific cyclone season

The 2015–16 Australian region cyclone season was the least active Australian region cyclone season since reliable records started during 1969, with only three named tropical cyclones developing in the region. Reasons for the low activity during the year included a positive Indian Ocean Dipole occurring and the 2014–16 El Niño event. Ahead of the season starting; the Australian Bureau of Meteorology predicted that there was a 91% chance that the season would be below average. As the 2015–16 tropical cyclone year opened on 1 July 2015, the newly named Tropical Cyclone Raquel moved south-westward into the Australian region. Over the next couple of days, the system meandered around 160°E and moved through the Solomon Islands, before it was last noted on 5 July. The basin subsequently remained quiet with only several weak tropical lows developing, before the first named tropical cyclone of the season was named Stan during 29 January 2016.

Stan subsequently made landfall on Western Australia and impacted various commodities including oil, natural gas and iron ore. However, impacts were limited due to the low population of the region. The precursor tropical low to Tropical Cyclone Uriah developed over the Indian Ocean, within a monsoon trough of low pressure during 9 February. The system subsequently developed further and was named Uriah during 13 February, before it moved out of the region during the following day. Tropical Cyclone Tatiana developed into a tropical cyclone, during 11 February while it was located over the Coral Sea. Over the next few days, the system remained over water and dissipated during 15 February after it had produced some powerful, long period swells along Queensland beaches. After Tatiana dissipated four tropical lows occurred in the region, before the season ended on 30 April, including the remnant tropical low of Severe Tropical Cyclone Winston.

== Seasonal forecasts ==
| Region | Average number | Chance of more | Chance of less | Actual activity |
|---|---|---|---|---|
| Whole | 11 | 9% | 91% | 3 |
| Western | 7 | 25% | 75% | 2 |
| North-Western | 5 | 15% | 85% | 1 |
| Northern | 3 | 36% | 64% | None |
| Eastern | 4 | 27% | 83% | 1 |
| Western South Pacific | 7 | 15% | 85% | 1 |
| Eastern South Pacific | 10 | 48% | 52% | 4 |
Source: BOM's Seasonal Outlooks for Tropical Cyclones.

Ahead of the cyclone season, the FMS, the BoM, Météo-France, New Zealand's MetService and National Institute of Water and Atmospheric Research (NIWA) and various other Pacific Meteorological services, all contributed towards the Island Climate Update tropical cyclone outlook that was released during October 2015. The outlook took into account the strong El Niño conditions that had been observed across the Pacific and analogue seasons that had ENSO neutral and weak El Niño conditions occurring during the season. The outlook called for an above average number of tropical cyclones for the 2015–16 season, with eleven to thirteen named tropical cyclones to occur between 135°E and 120°W compared to an average of 10–12. At least six of the tropical cyclones were expected to become category 3 severe tropical cyclones, while four could become category 4 severe tropical cyclones. It was also noted that Category 5 severe tropical cyclones, with 10-minute sustained windspeeds of 196 km/h (122 mph) were known to occur during El Niño events.

In addition to contributing towards the Island Climate Update outlook, the BoM issued seven seasonal forecasts during October 2015, for the Australian region and the Southern Pacific with each forecast covering the whole tropical cyclone year. It was forecast that the region would less active than during previous years, with a 91% chance of a below average amount of tropical cyclones, because of the strong El Niño episode that had developed over the Pacific Ocean. It was also noted that the first tropical cyclone landfall might be later than usual, with the average first landfall taking place in January during El Niño conditions. For the Western region between 90°E and 125°E, the BoM forecast that the area would also see activity below its average of 7, with a 25% chance of an above average number of tropical cyclones occurring. TCWC Perth also noted that there was a likelihood of two tropical cyclones and a significant likelihood of at least one severe tropical cyclone impacting Western Australia. For the North-Western subregion between 105°E and 130°E, it was predicted that activity would be below average, with a 15% chance of above average tropical cyclone activity. The Northern Territory which was defined as being between as being 125°E and 142.5°E had a 36% chance of an above average season. The Eastern region between 142.5°E and 160°E was predicted to have a near normal tropical cyclone season, though it was noted that there was a possibility of a delayed start to the season. The BoM issued a seasonal forecast for both the Western and Eastern South Pacific. The Western region between 142.5°E and 165°E was predicted to have a 15% chance of having an above average number of tropical cyclones, while the Eastern region between 165°E and 120°W was predicted to have a 48% chance of having an above average number of tropical cyclones.

== Seasonal summary ==
During the season only three tropical cyclones developed within the Australian region, which meant that the season was considered to be the least active season since reliable records started in 1969. This low activity was partially attributed to the 2014–16 El Niño event, which caused systems to be displaced eastwards into the South Pacific tropical cyclone basin. A positive Indian Ocean Dipole event caused cooler-than-normal waters in tropical eastern Indian Ocean, near Indonesia, which in turn limited development near Western Australia during the first part of the season. As the 2015–16 tropical cyclone year opened on 1 July 2015, the newly named Tropical Cyclone Raquel moved south-westward into the Australian region. Over the next couple of days, the system meandered around 160°E and moved through the Solomon Islands, before it was last noted on 5 July. The basin subsequently remained quiet with only several weak tropical lows developing, before the first named tropical cyclone of the season was named Stan during 29 January 2016.

Stan subsequently made landfall on Western Australia and impacted various commodities including oil, natural gas, and iron ore. However, impacts were limited due to the low population of the region. The precursor tropical low to Tropical Cyclone Uriah developed over the Indian Ocean, within a monsoon trough of low pressure during 9 February. The system subsequently developed further and was named Uriah during 13 February, before it moved out of the region during the following day. Tropical Cyclone Tatiana developed into a tropical cyclone, during 11 February while it was located over the Coral Sea. Over the next few days, the system remained over water and dissipated during 15 February after it had produced some powerful, long period swells along Queensland beaches. After Tatiana dissipated four tropical lows occurred in the region before the season ended on 30 April, including the remnant tropical low of Severe Tropical Cyclone Winston.

== Systems ==
=== Tropical Low 04U ===
- Tropical low (Australian scale)
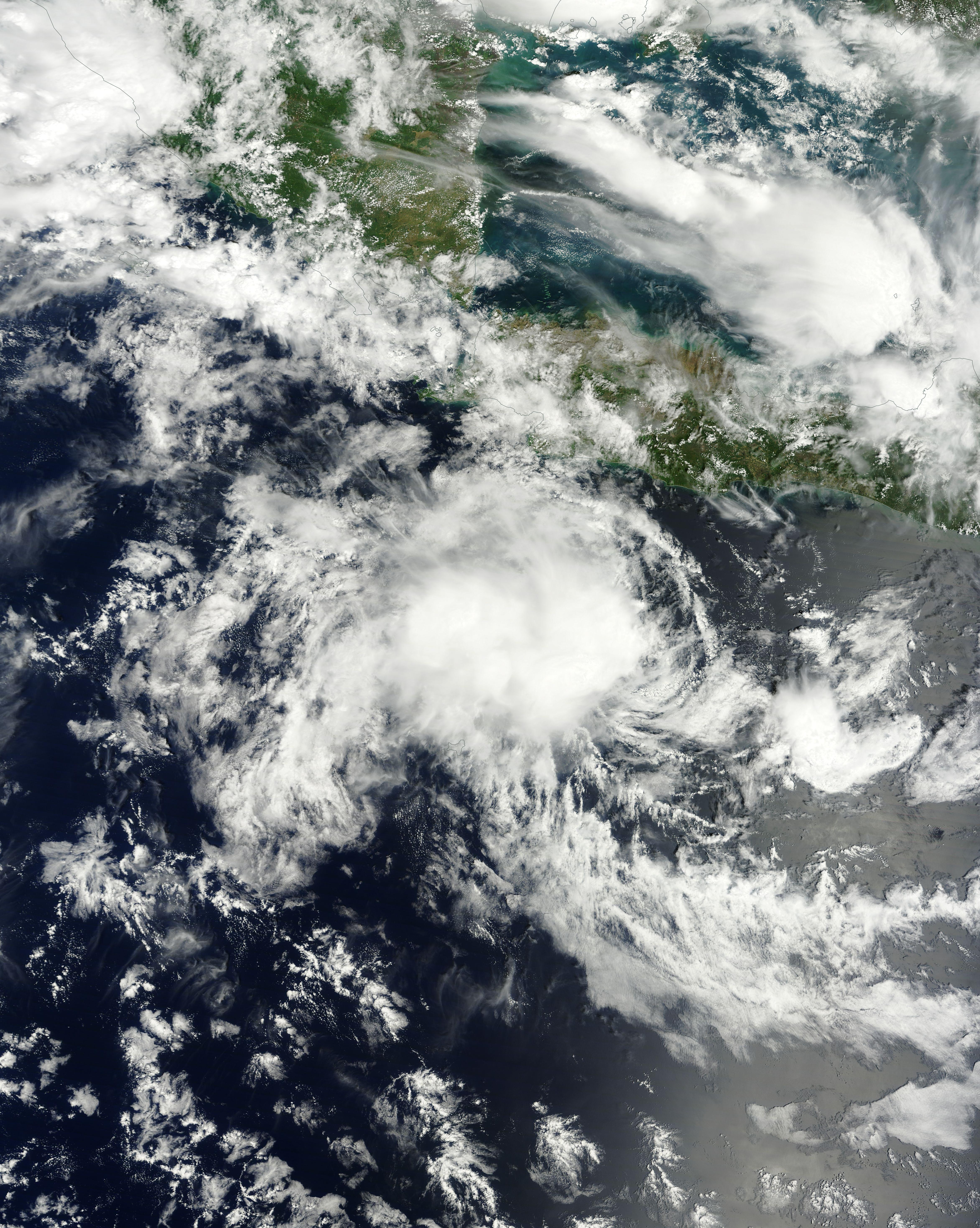
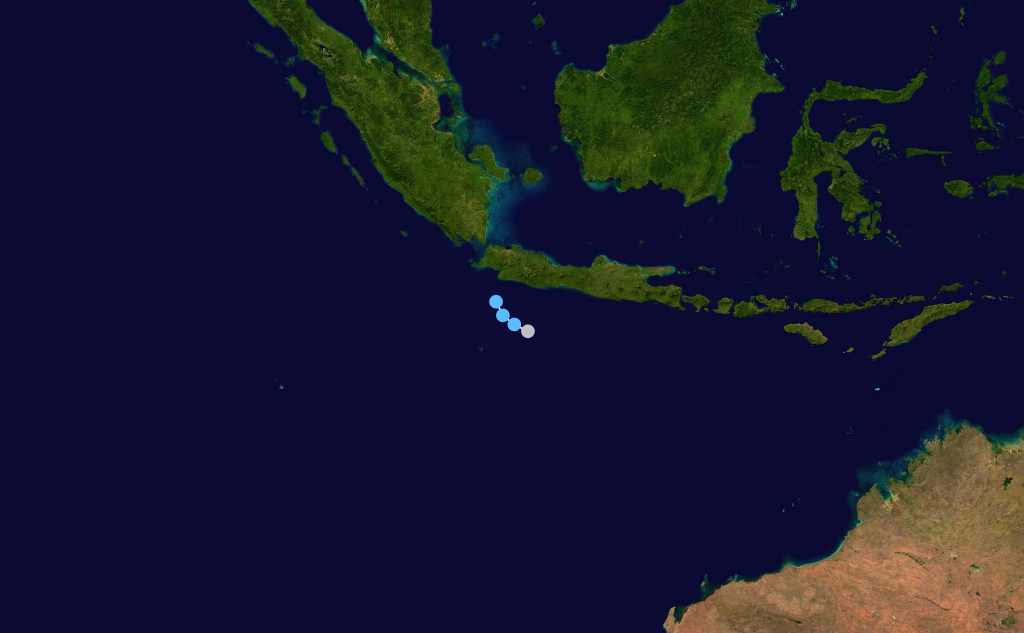
- Duration: 17 December – 23 December
- Peak intensity: Winds not specified; 1006 hPa (mbar)

On 16 December, TCWC Perth mentioned that a tropical low may develop northwest of Christmas Island. The agency declared to be a tropical low by the next day when it was producing convection in its area. On 20 December, TCWC Jakarta issued an advisory as the low was inside their area of responsibility, as it was located about 567 km (352 mi) south-southwest of Tanjung Karang. TCWC Perth forecast the low would intensify to a tropical cyclone and move into the Western Region by 24 hours on 21 December. The low was later designated as 04U on 23 December, however, this was the last advisory issued by TCWC Perth and rapidly dissipated overnight.

=== Tropical Low 05U ===
- Tropical low (Australian scale)
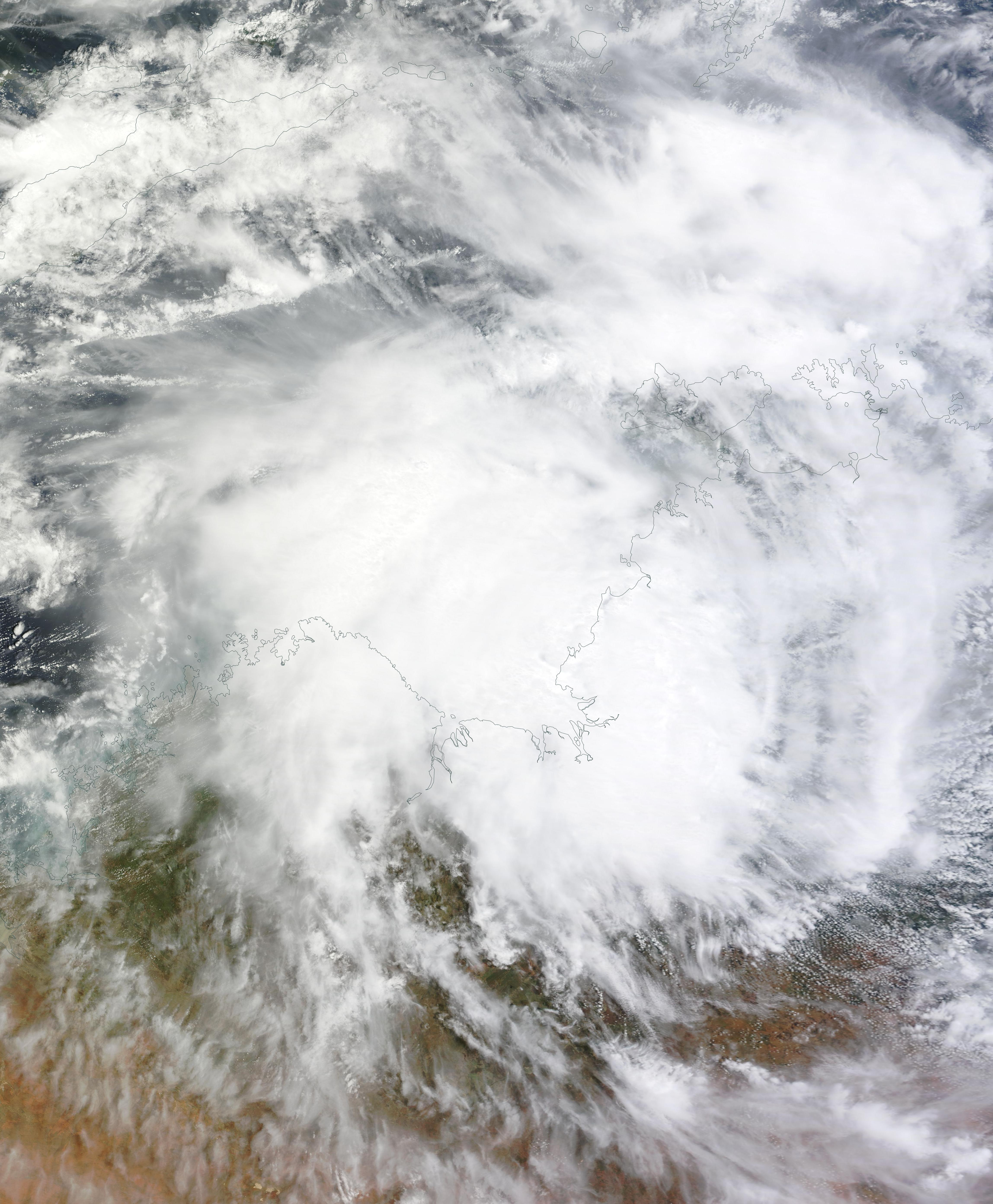
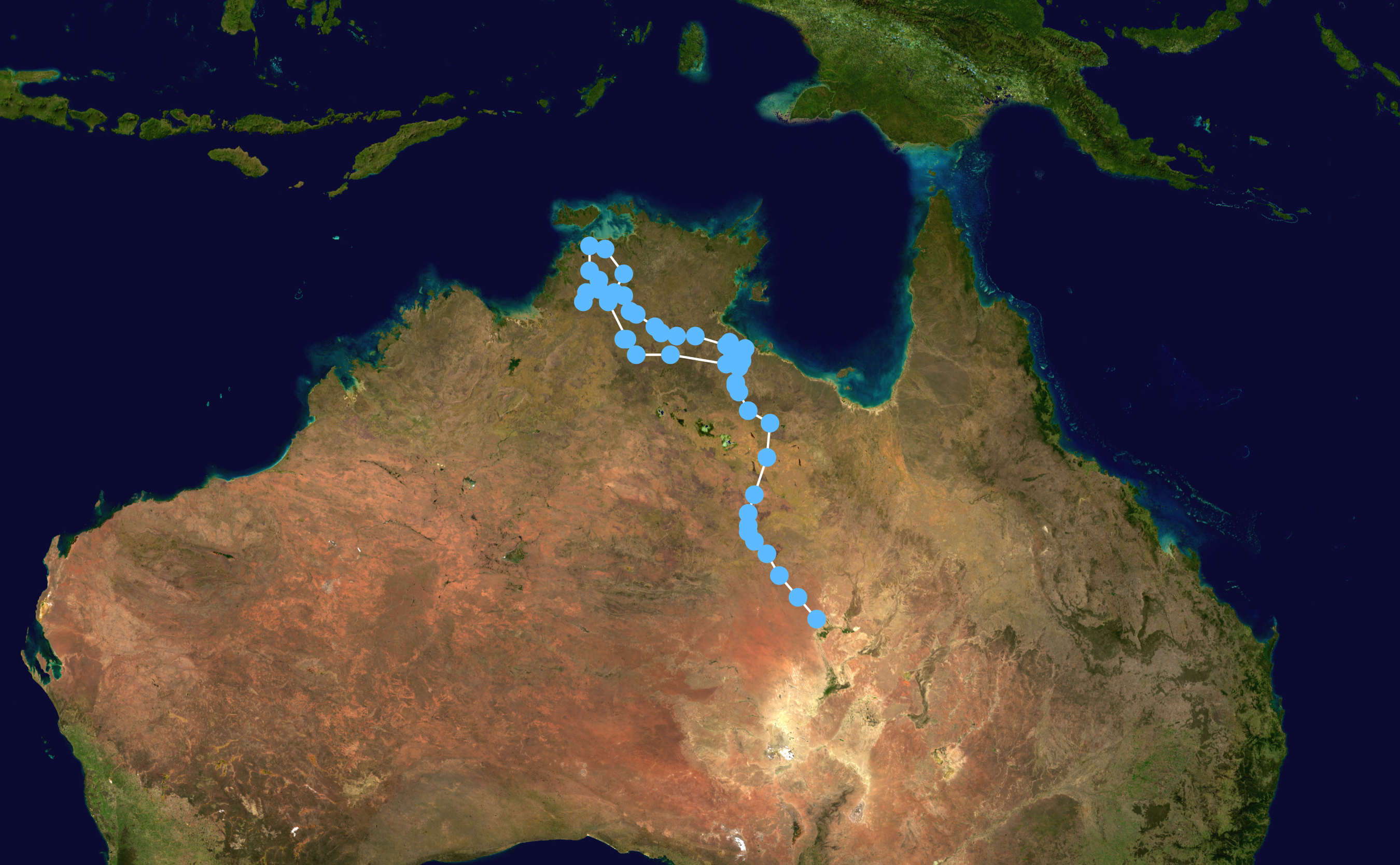
- Duration: 21 December – 1 January
- Peak intensity: 55 km/h (35 mph) (10-min); 994 hPa (mbar)

Tropical Low 05U developed over land near Borroloola in the Northern Territory during 21 December. Over the next couple of days, the system gradually deepened further as it moved west-northwest inland and passed near Daly Waters and Katherine. The system subsequently approached Darwin during 24 December, where it was causing near gale-force winds offshore. On 26 December, 05U was embedded within a monsoon, giving a potential of intensifying into a tropical cyclone. A couple of days later, 05U drifted southeastwards towards land and failed to reach tropical cyclone intensity. The system was last noted on 2 January while it was located over the Simpson Desert in Queensland, as it was not clear if the low continued towards the east coast or another system had developed.

=== Tropical Cyclone Stan ===
- Category 2 tropical cyclone (Australian scale)
- Category 1 tropical cyclone (SSHWS)
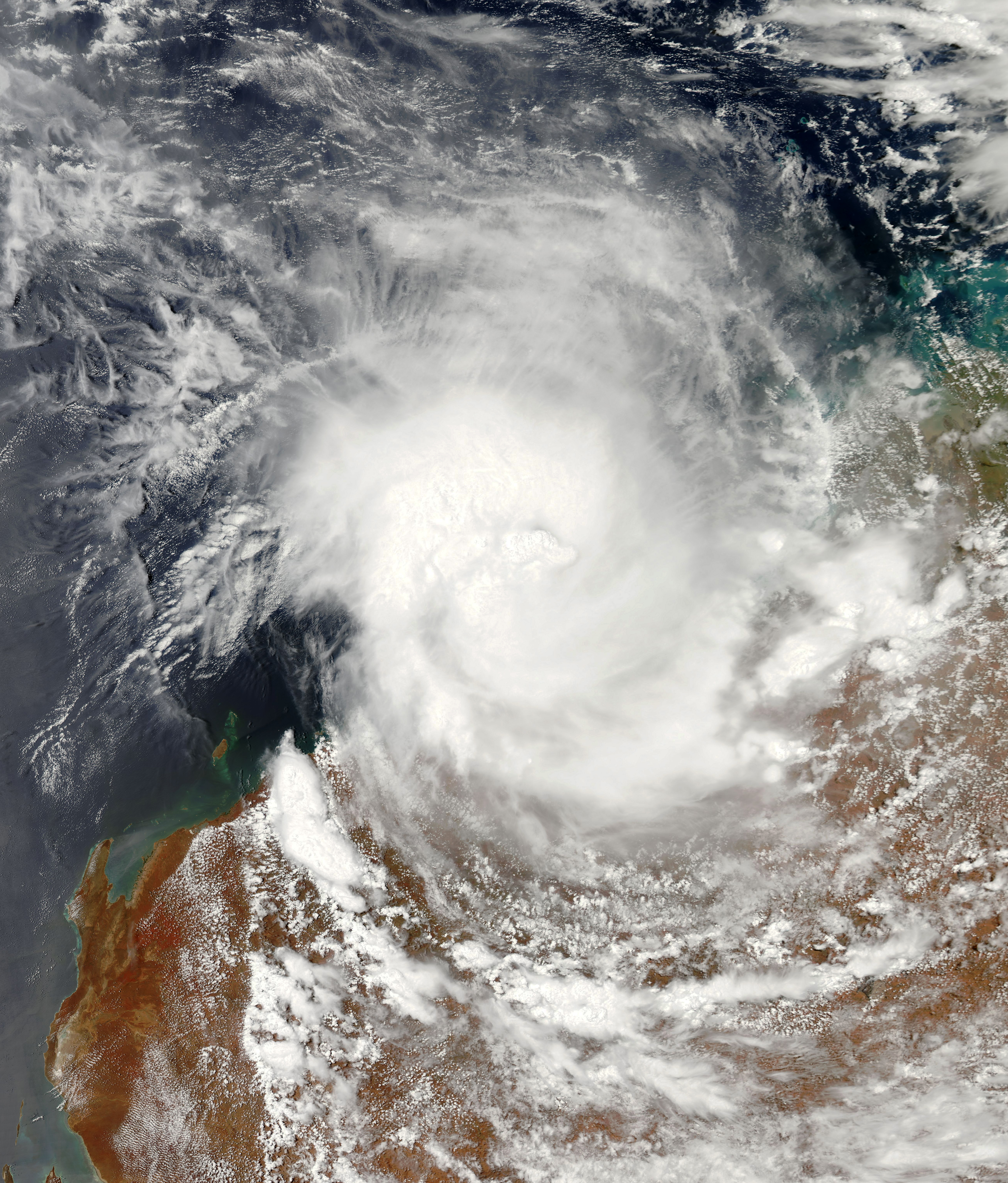
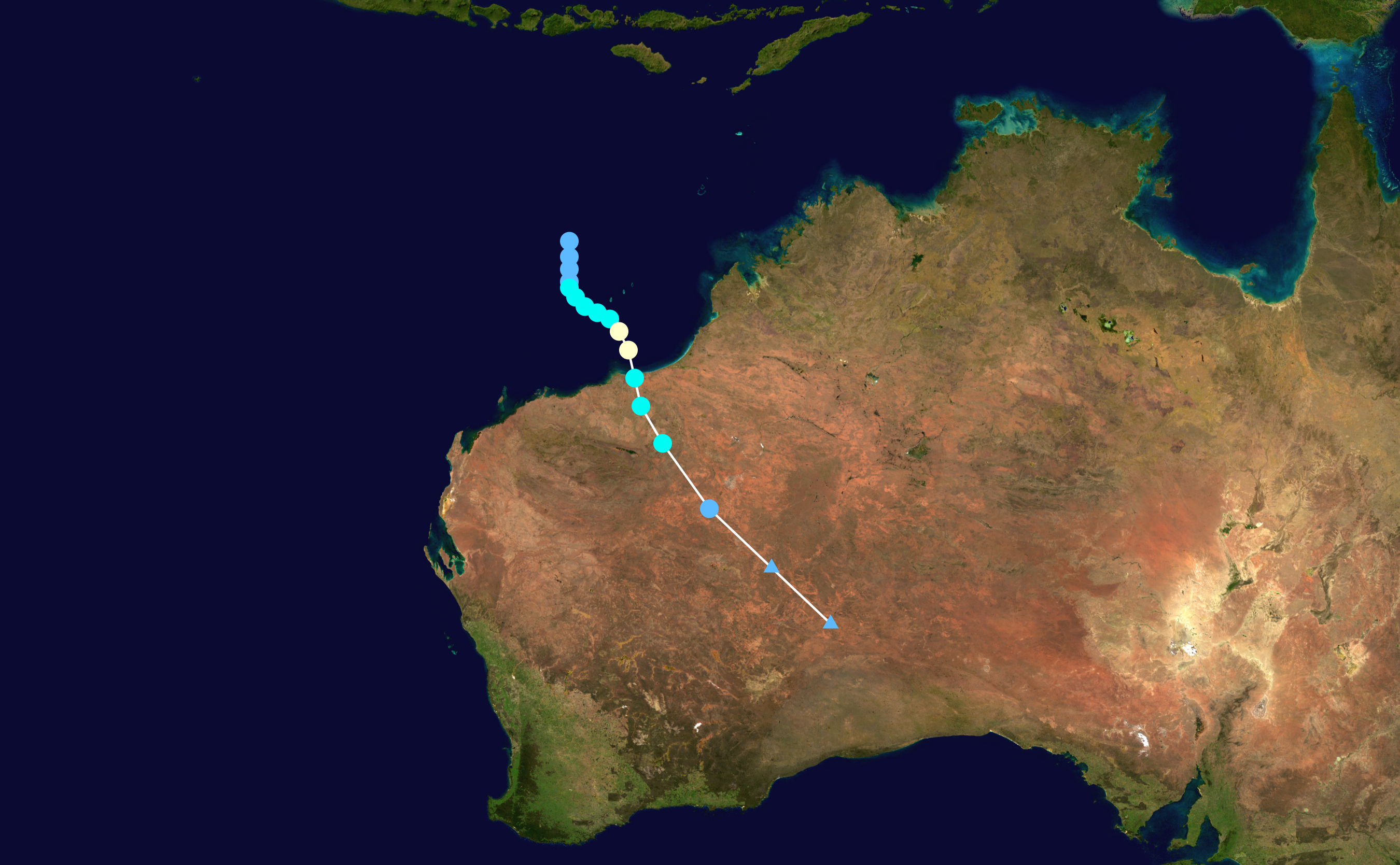
- Duration: 27 January – 31 January
- Peak intensity: 100 km/h (65 mph) (10-min); 980 hPa (mbar)

On 27 January, the BoM reported that Tropical Low 08U had developed about 750 km (465 mi) to the north of Port Hedland. The system was located within a favorable environment for further development and was forecast to develop into a tropical cyclone over the next couple of days, as it moved southwards towards the coast of Western Australia. 08U was subsequently declared a Category 1 tropical cyclone on 29 January and was named Stan by the BoM. Stan continued to intensify during the day as it slowly moved in a southeast direction towards the east Pilbara coast. Stan reached category 2 tropical cyclone strength at 8:00 pm AWST time, when it was located 280 km north of Port Hedland. Stan maintained category 2 strength during the course of 30 January. Category 1 strength hurricane-force winds formed around 9:30 am AWST the same day, near Rowley Shoales where Stan was 100 km south of the island. Stan crossed the east Pilbara coast between Port Hedland and Wallal as a strong category 2 tropical cyclone at 2:00 am AWST. Stan proceeded to weaken while moving inland, becoming a category 1 tropical cyclone at 8:00 am the same day, and further weakened to become a tropical low at 2:00 pm that afternoon. It later dissipated the same day.

The Bureau of Meteorology (BoM) issued a Yellow alert for coastal communities between Pardoo and Mardie Station, which included the cities of Port Hedland, South Hedland, and Karratha, while a blue alert was put in place for areas between Bidyadanga to Pardoo, and between Mardie Station to Pannawonica. The ports of Port Hedland and Dampier were closed. Storm surge warnings were issued for coastal areas between Wallal and Whim Creek, while flood warnings were also issued. Intense rainfall ranging from 100-125 mm hit coasts of Pilbara. Two men were trapped in their cars due to rising waters in Paraburdoo. Wind gusts as high as 80 mph (130 km/h) hit the community of Rowley Shoals. Roads and highways in the region were closed and were damaged by the flooding. Many trees and power lines were felled by the strong winds. Some homes in the landfall site had damaged roofs. The remnants of Stan caused record-breaking rain in South Australia. Coffin Bay received 75.8mm of rain, the Nullarbor Plain received 62.4mm, and Port Lincoln received 49.6mm of rainfall. The city was affected by intense flooding, while unusually high rainfall hit Adelaide.

=== Tropical Cyclone Uriah ===
- Category 2 tropical cyclone (Australian scale)
- Tropical storm (SSHWS)
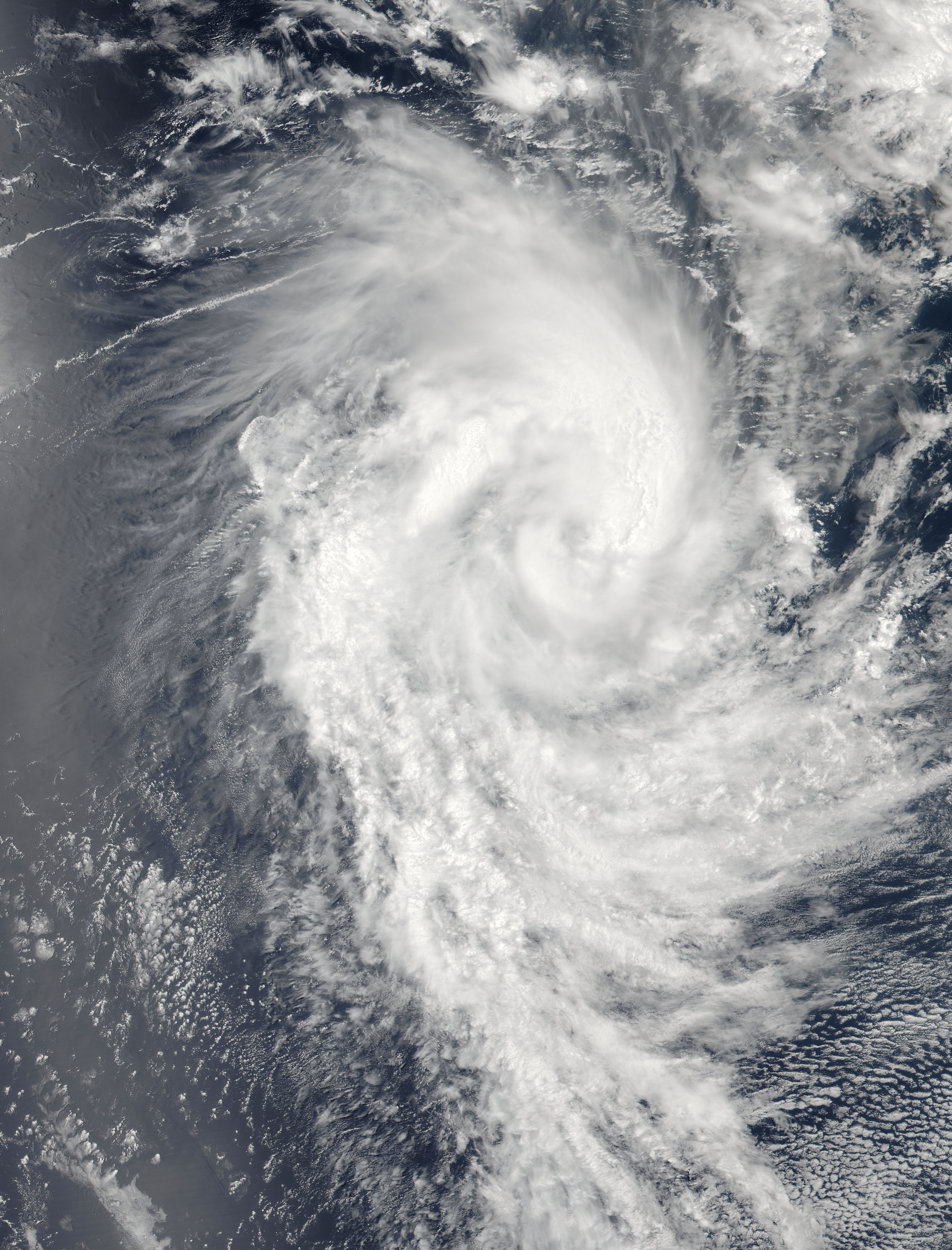
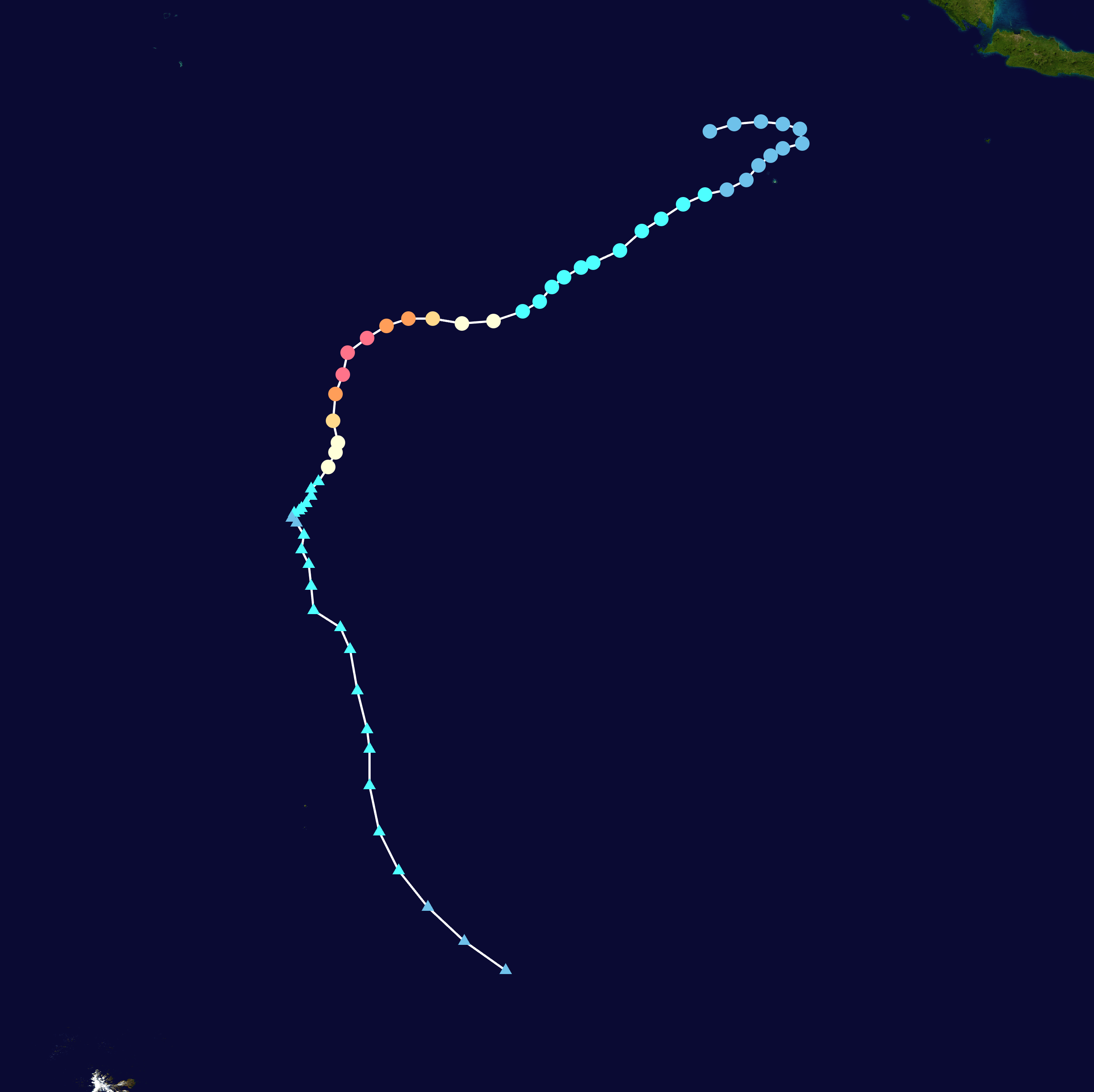
- Duration: 9 February – 14 February (Exited basin)
- Peak intensity: 95 km/h (60 mph) (10-min); 987 hPa (mbar)

Tropical Low 09U developed over the Indian Ocean to the northwest of the Cocos (Keeling) Islands, within a monsoon trough of low pressure during 9 February. Over the next few days, the system moved slowly in an area of weak steering flow as it struggled to develop further before it started moving turned to the southwest during 12 February. Later that day the system passed about 100 km (62 mi) to the northwest of the Cocos (Keeling) Islands, before conditions became favorable for further development as the system moved away from the islands. As a result, the low was named Uriah by the BoM during 13 February, as it developed into a Category 1 tropical cyclone on the Australian tropical cyclone intensity scale. The JTWC also initiated advisories on the system during that day and designated it as Tropical Cyclone 13S. Over the next day, the system continued to move south-westwards and became a Category 2 tropical cyclone with 10-minute sustained winds of 95 km/h (60 mph). The system moved out of the region and into the South West Indian Ocean basin during 14 February, where it became an intense tropical cyclone before degenerating into a remnant low on 19 February.

=== Tropical Cyclone Tatiana ===
- Category 2 tropical cyclone (Australian scale)
- Tropical storm (SSHWS)
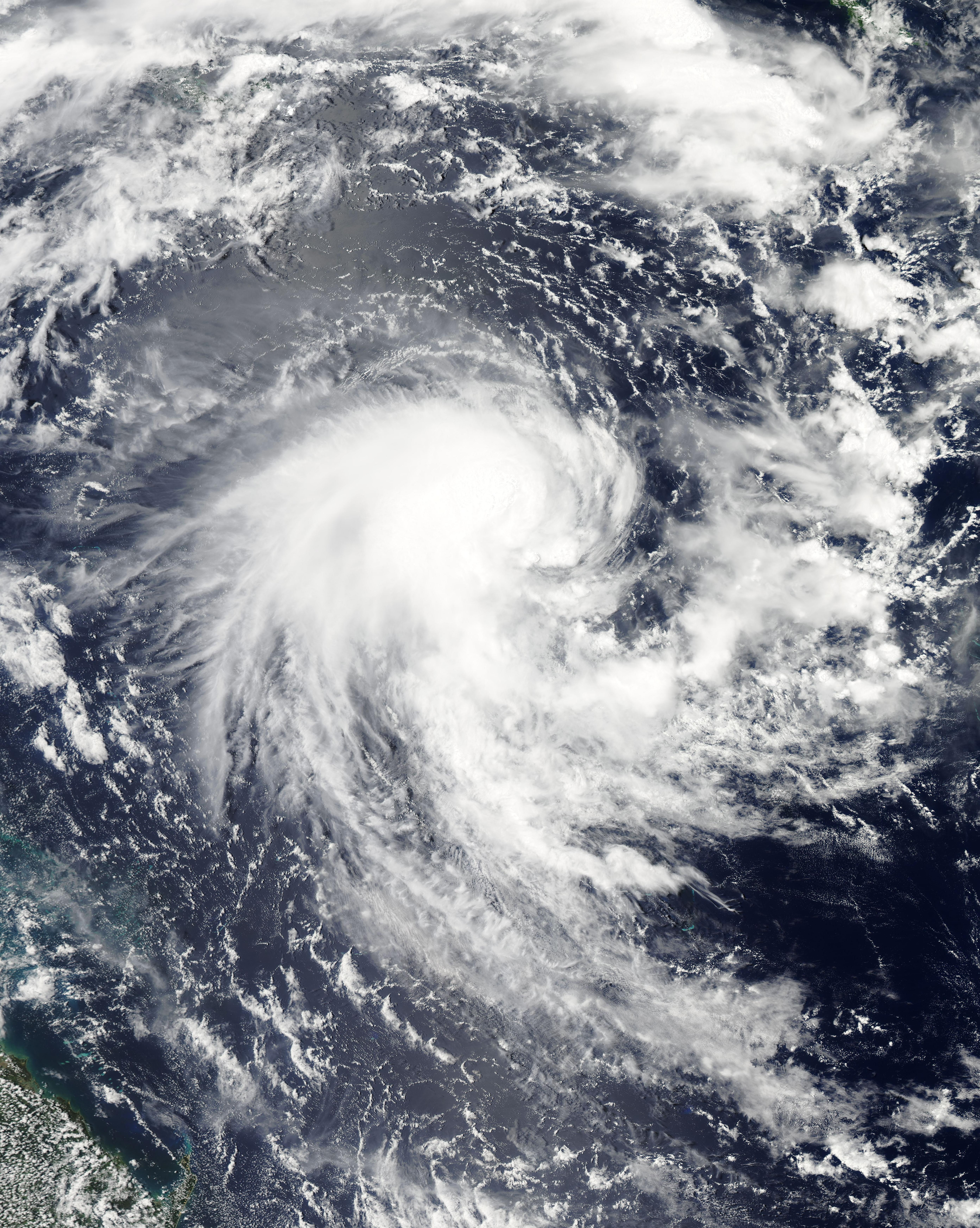
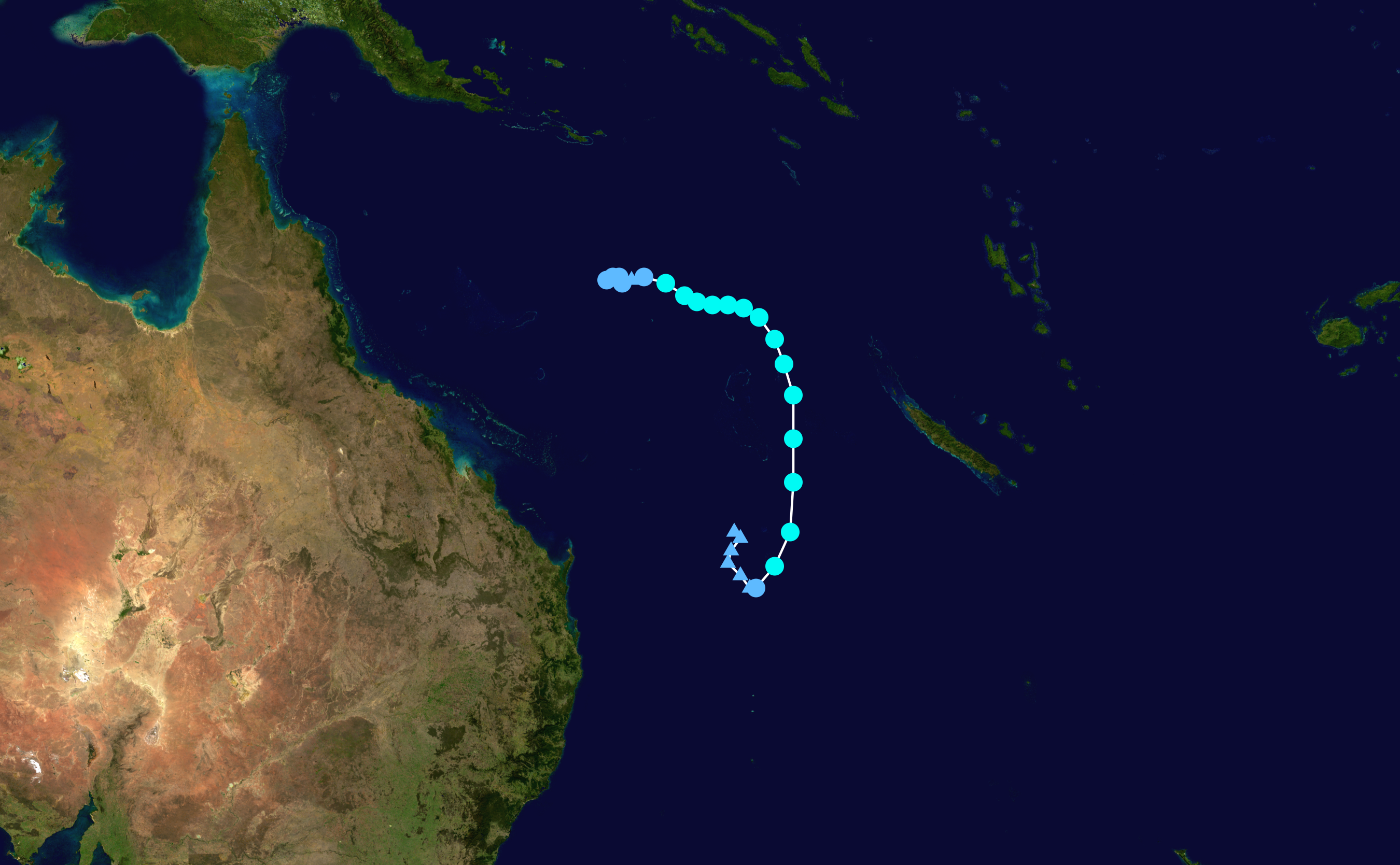
- Duration: 9 February – 14 February
- Peak intensity: 95 km/h (60 mph) (10-min); 982 hPa (mbar)

Tropical Low 10U developed during 9 February within the central Coral Sea, about 900 km (560 mi) to the southwest of Honiara in the Solomon Islands. The system was located within a favorable environment for further development, with the low-level circulation center gradually consolidating, while deep atmospheric convection wrapped into the system. Over the next couple of days, the system gradually developed further as it moved eastwards before the JTWC initiated advisories on the system and designated it as Tropical Cyclone 12P during 10 February. Over the next day, the system continued to develop and was named Tatiana by the BoM, as it developed into a Category 1 tropical cyclone.

By this time Tatiana had started to move towards the east-southeast under the combined influence of the monsoon flow and a trough of low pressure. The system subsequently peaked as a Category 2 tropical cyclone with 10-minute sustained winds of 95 km/h (60 mph) during 12 February, before it moved just out of the Australian region and into the South Pacific basin. The system subsequently moved southwards and rapidly weakened during the next day, before it lost its tropical characteristics and degenerated into a subtropical low during 14 February, as the storm moved back into the Australian Basin. After the system had degenerated into a subtropical low, it produced some powerful, long period swells along southeast Queensland beaches.

=== Tropical Low 12U ===
- Tropical low (Australian scale)
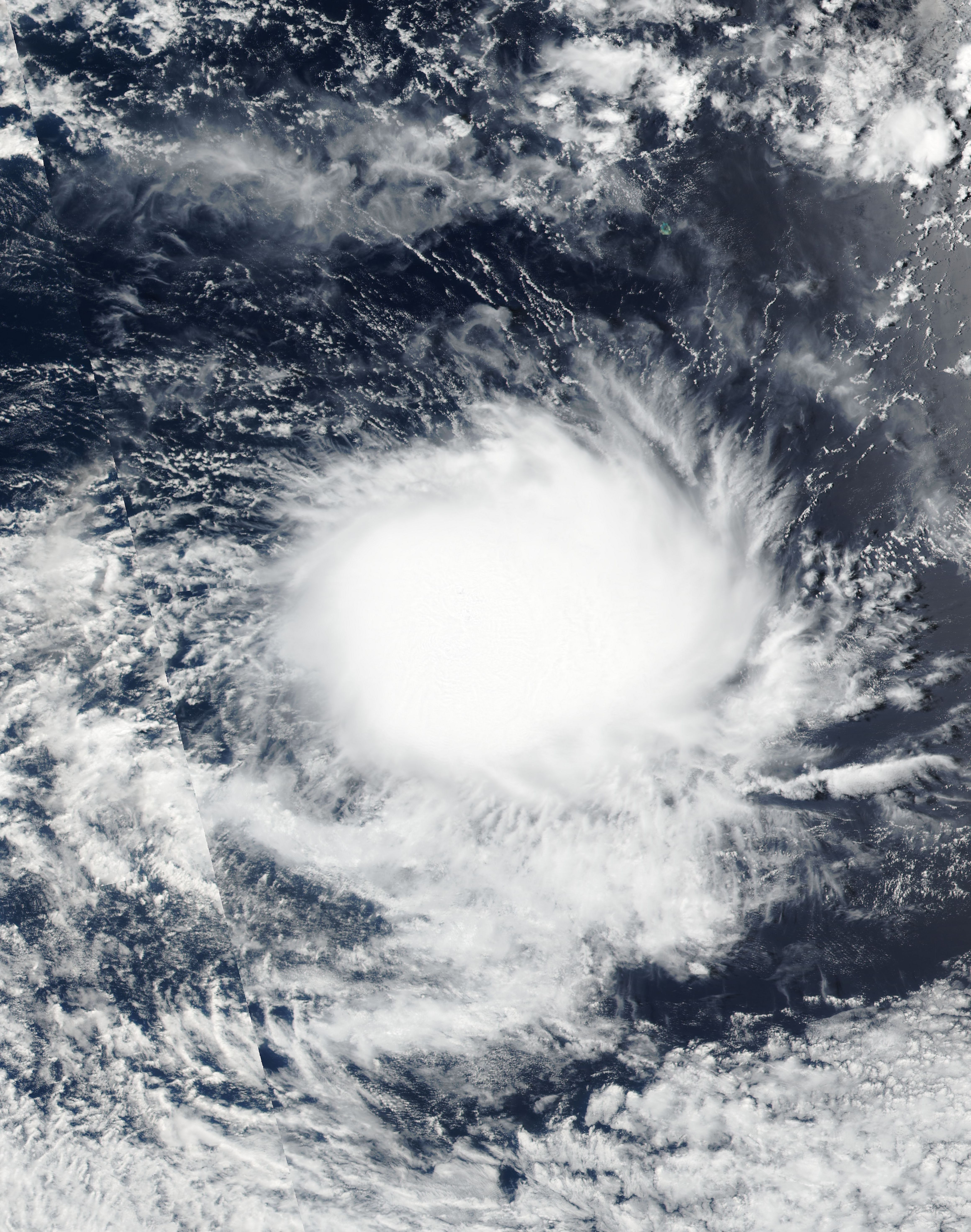
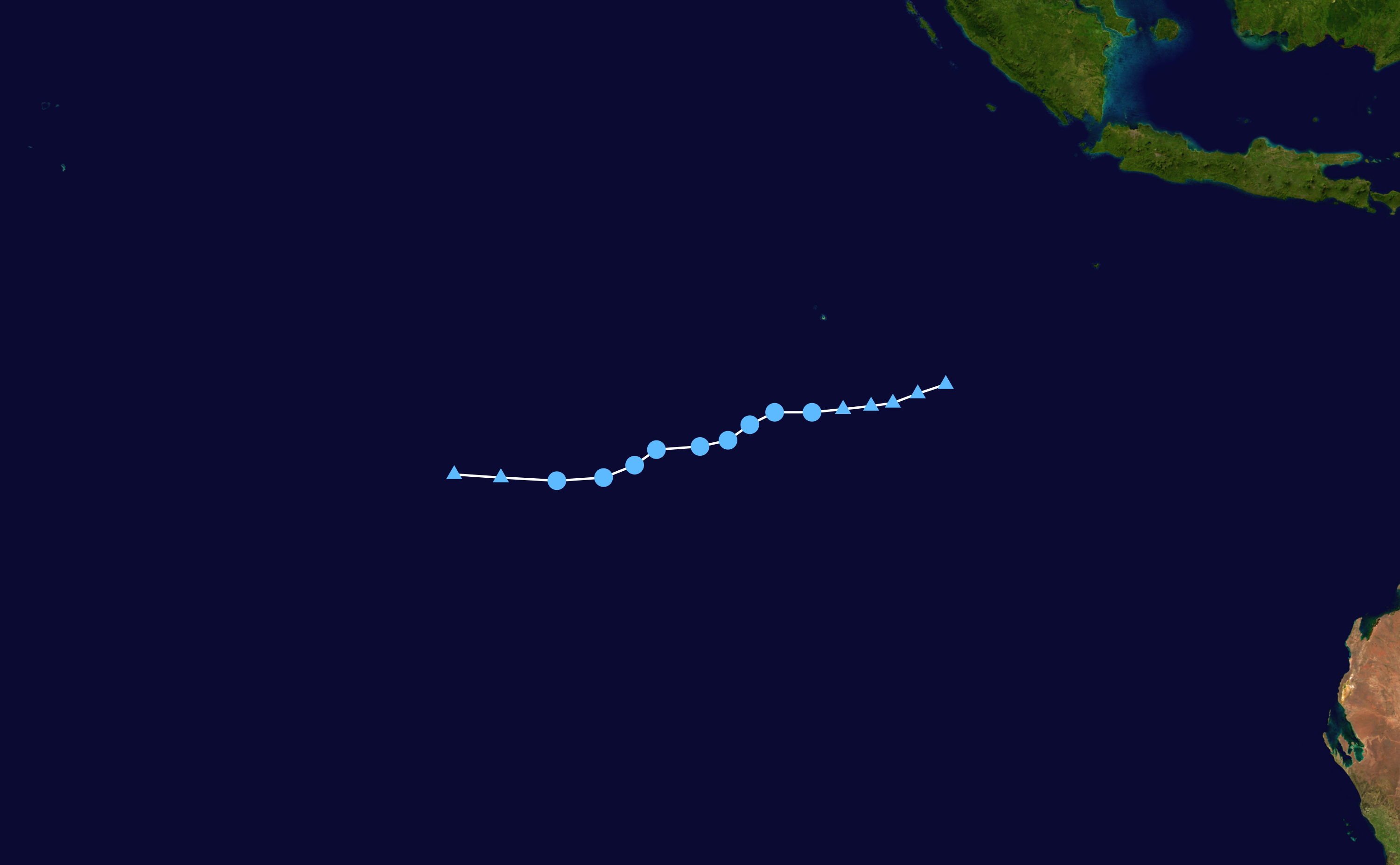
- Duration: 1 March – 6 March
- Peak intensity: 65 km/h (40 mph) (10-min); 1000 hPa (mbar)

On 1 March, BoM started monitoring a weak tropical low to the south of Java, Indonesia. The low moved in a westward direction until on 5 March, the BoM started issuing bulletins on the system with the designation of 12U and winds of 65 km/h (40 mph), however, it was still classified as a tropical low since gale-force winds were only found in the southern quadrants. The tropical low moved out of the basin on 6 March, without intensifying into a Category 1 tropical cyclone.

Tropical Low 12U existed from 28 February to 7 March 2016 in the Australian region, with a minimum central pressure of 1000 hPa and maximum sustained winds of 30 knots. It remained a tropical low throughout its life and never reached Category 1 intensity on the Australian scale.

=== Tropical Low 14U ===
- Tropical low (Australian scale)
- Tropical storm (SSHWS)
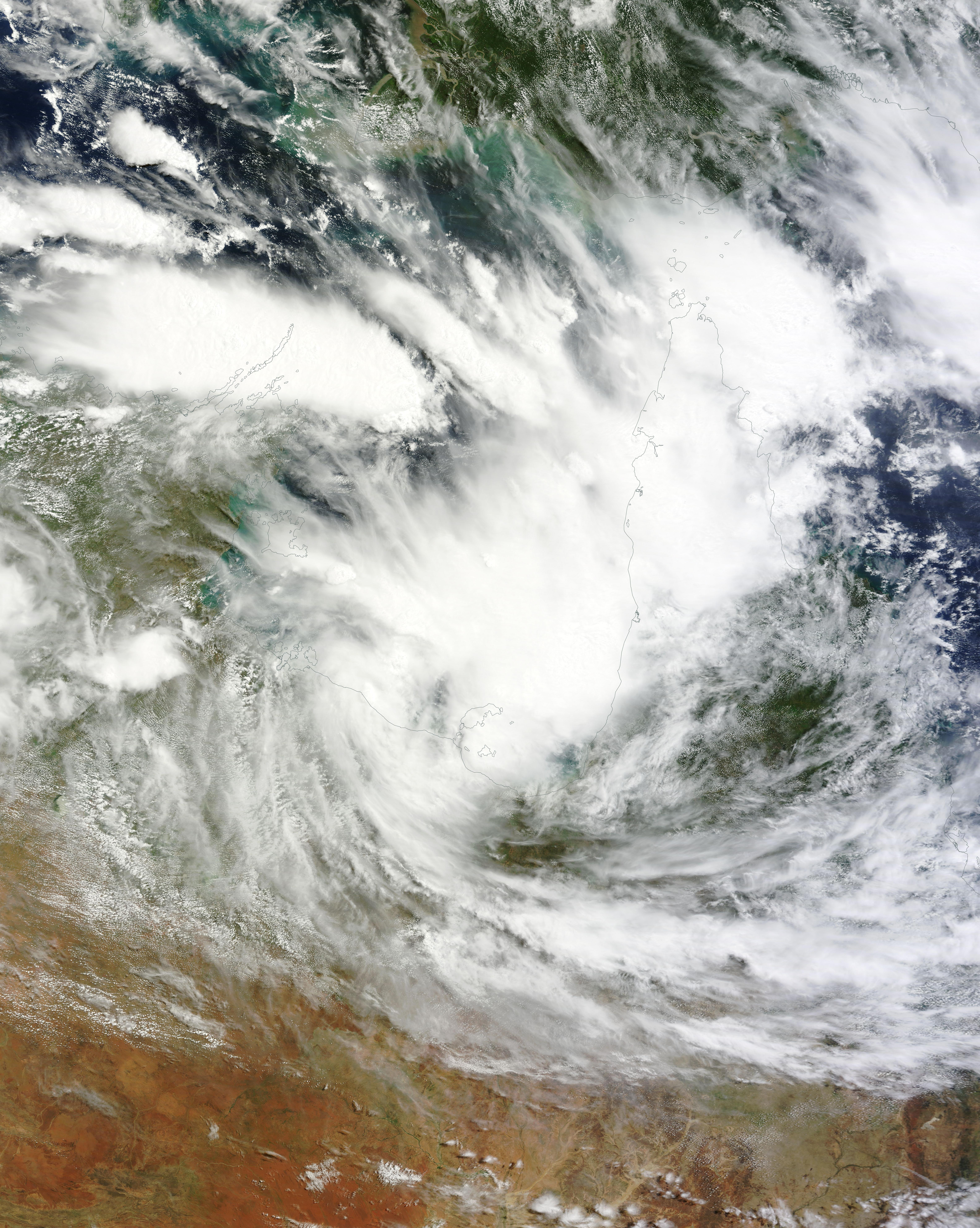
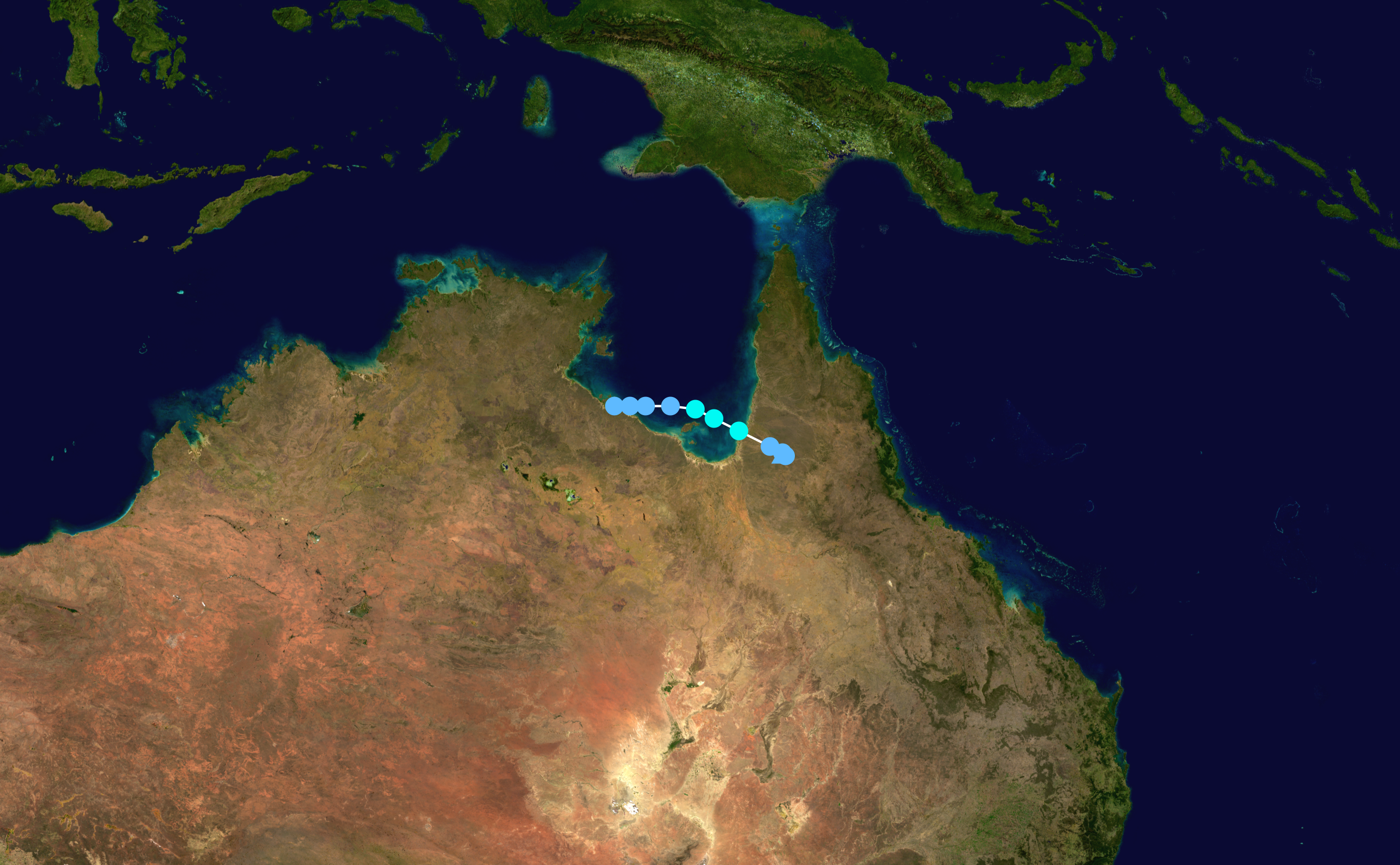
- Duration: 14 March – 16 March
- Peak intensity: 55 km/h (35 mph) (10-min); 998 hPa (mbar)

Tropical Low 14U developed within a monsoon trough near Vanderlin Island, in the southern Gulf of Carpentaria, on 14 March.

=== Other systems ===
On 1 July, as the 2015–16 tropical cyclone year opened, the newly named Tropical Cyclone Raquel moved southwestward into the Australian region. During that day the system started to move eastwards in response to the background westerly flow before it weakened below tropical cyclone intensity as it moved back into the South Pacific basin during 2 July. The system subsequently moved back into the Australian region during 4 July, as it moved through the Solomon Islands. The system was subsequently last noted by the BoM to the southwest of Guadalcanal, on 5 July, as it rapidly lost its tropical characteristics.

A low-pressure developed east of the 90th meridian east or the border of the basin on 26 December, and had a moderate chance of intensifying into a tropical cyclone. TCWC Perth later classified it as a weak tropical low with the identifier of 06U. On 28 December, as the low slowly moved south, unfavorable environments hinder the chance of being a cyclone. TCWC Perth made its final bulletin of the tropical low as it slowly drifted west on 29 December. During 19 January Tropical Low 07U developed within the monsoon trough of low pressure, about 300 km (185 mi) to the west of West Island in the Cocos (Keeling) Islands. Over the next couple of days, the system moved north-eastwards and tried to develop further in a marginally conducive environment for further development. However, the system weakened on 21 January, before it was last noted on 24 January, as it was not expected to develop into a tropical cyclone. During 14 February a weak tropical low lied in an area of marginal conditions for further develop near Christmas Island. Over the next couple of days, environmental conditions surrounding the system became less favorable for further development, before the system was last noted during 16 February. During 26 February, Winston entered the basin as an extratropical cyclone, whilst the JTWC classified it as a subtropical cyclone; ultimately, it made landfall over Queensland as a tropical low and quickly degenerated into a trough, on 3 March.

== Storm names ==
During the season a total of 3 tropical cyclones received a name from BoM, either by TCWC Perth, Darwin, or Brisbane, when the system was judged to have 10-minute sustained windspeeds of 65 km/h (40 mph). There has only been one list that the Bureau of Meteorology have assigned names to tropical cyclones since the 2008–09 season. Tropical cyclones named by the TCWC Jakarta and Port Moresby are rare, with the last named cyclones occurring during 2014 and 2007, respectively. No names were retired.

- Stan
- Tatiana
- Uriah

== Season effects ==
| Name | Dates | Peak intensity | | | Areas affected | Damages (AU$) | Damages (US$) | Deaths |
| Name | Dates | Category | Wind speed (km/h (mph)) | Pressure (hPa) | Areas affected | Damages (AU$) | Damages (US$) | Deaths |
|---|---|---|---|---|---|---|---|---|
| 04U | 17–23 December | Tropical low | Not specified | 1,006 hPa (29.71 inHg) | None | None | None | None |
| 05U | 21 December – 2 January | Tropical low | 55 km/h (35 mph) | 994 hPa (29.35 inHg) | Northern Territory, Queensland | None | None | None |
| 06U | 27–29 December | Tropical low | Not specified | Not specified | None | None | None | None |
| 07U | 19–25 January | Tropical low | Not specified | Not specified | None | None | None | None |
| Stan | 27 January – 1 February | Category 2 tropical cyclone | 100 km/h (65 mph) | 980 hPa (28.94 inHg) | Western Australia & Southern Australia | Minimal | None | |
| Uriah | 9 – 14 February 2016 | Category 2 tropical cyclone | 95 km/h (60 mph) | 982 hPa (29.00 inHg) | Cocos Islands | Minimal | None | |
| Tatiana | 9 – 14 February | Category 2 tropical cyclone | 95 km/h (60 mph) | 983 hPa (29.03 inHg) | Queensland | Minimal | None | |
| 11U | 14–16 February | Tropical low | Not specified | Not specified | None | None | None | None |
| 12U | 1–6 March | Tropical low | 65 km/h (40 mph) | 1,000 hPa (29.53 inHg) | None | None | None | None |
| 13U (Winston) | 3 March | Tropical low | Not specified | 1,010 hPa (29.83 inHg) | Queensland | None | None | None |
| 14U | 14–16 March | Tropical low | 55 km/h (35 mph) | 998 hPa (29.47 inHg) | Northern Territory, Queensland | None | None | None |
Season aggregates
| 11 systems | 17 December – 16 March | | 110 km/h (70 mph) | 975 hPa (28.79 inHg) | | Minimal | 0 | |

== See also ==
- Australian region tropical cyclone
- Weather of 2015 and 2016
- Tropical cyclones in 2015 and 2016
- South Atlantic tropical cyclone
- Atlantic hurricane seasons: 2015, 2016
- Pacific hurricane seasons: 2015, 2016
- Pacific typhoon seasons: 2015, 2016
- North Indian Ocean cyclone seasons: 2015, 2016
- 2015–16 South-West Indian Ocean cyclone season
- 2015–16 South Pacific cyclone season
