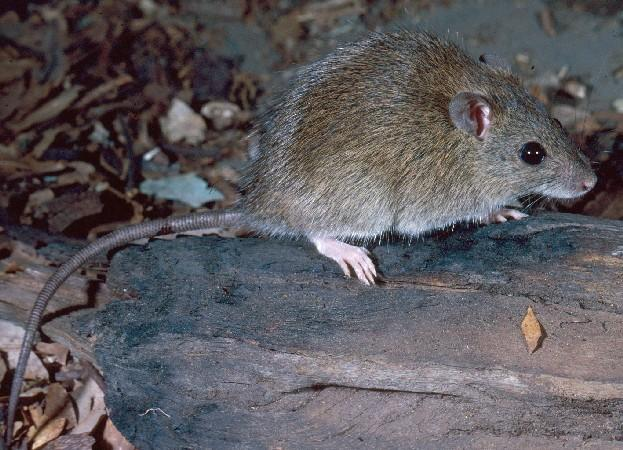

Conservation status
- Least Concern (IUCN 3.1)

Scientific classification
- Kingdom: Animalia
- Phylum: Chordata
- Class: Mammalia
- Order: Rodentia
- Family: Muridae
- Genus: Rattus
- Species: R. sordidus

Binomial name
- Rattus sordidus (Gould, 1858)

= Dusky field rat =

Species of rodent

The dusky field rat (Rattus sordidus), also known as the canefield rat, is a species of rodent in the family Muridae. It is found in Australia, Indonesia, and Papua New Guinea. In Australia it is found in northern Queensland and along the east coast as far south as Shoalwater Bay, where it is plentiful, and on South West Island in the Sir Edward Pellew Group off the Northern Territory, where it is considered a threatened species.
