= Acacia latifolia =

Scientific classification
- Kingdom: Plantae
- Clade: Embryophytes
- Clade: Tracheophytes
- Clade: Spermatophytes
- Clade: Angiosperms
- Clade: Eudicots
- Clade: Rosids
- Order: Fabales
- Family: Fabaceae
- Subfamily: Caesalpinioideae
- Clade: Mimosoid clade
- Genus: Acacia
- Species: A. latifolia

Binomial name
- Acacia latifolia Benth.
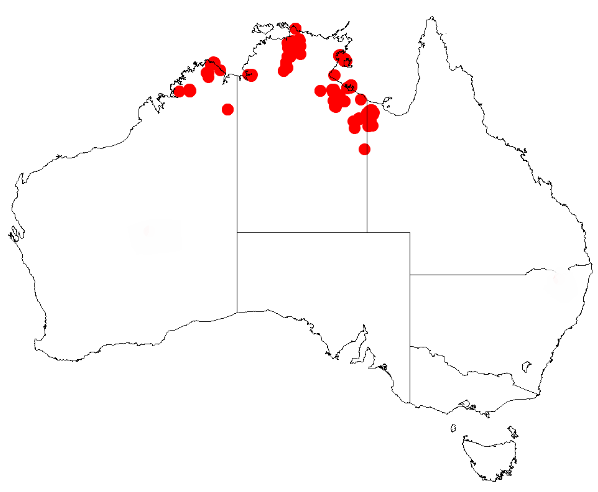
- Occurrence data from AVH

Synonyms
- Racosperma latifolium (Benth.) Pedley

Species of legume

Acacia latifolia is a species of flowering plant in the family Fabaceae and is endemic to northern Australia. It is a single-stemmed shrub or tree with smooth bark, flattened, winged branchlets, the wings formed by the lower edge of the phyllodes, the phyllodes narrowly lance-shaped to egg-shaped or elliptic, spikes of golden yellow flowers and linear pods.

== Description ==
Acacia latifolia is a single stemmed shrub or tree that typically grows to a height of 1.5–5 m (4 ft 11 in – 16 ft 5 in), and is covered with a powdery white bloom. Its has smooth brown bark and flattened, tawny yellow or brown, glabrous branchlets 5–10 mm (0.20–0.39 in) wide with wings 0.8–2.5 mm (0.031–0.098 in) wide and continuous with the lower edge of the phyllodes. The phyllodes are narrowly lance-shaped to egg-shaped or elliptic, 65–135 mm (2.6–5.3 in) long, 14–45 mm (0.55–1.77 in) wide and thin to slightly leathery with a convex upper margin. There are three to five conspicuous longitudinal veins, and a gland 3 mm (0.12 in) above the pulvinus. The flowers are golden yellow and borne in spikes usually 16–27 mm (0.63–1.06 in) long. Flowering occurs from May to October, and the pods are linear, straight or slightly sickle-shaped, flat or slightly twisted, 40–110 mm (1.6–4.3 in) long and 2–4.5 mm (0.079–0.177 in) wide with a prominent pale margin. The seeds are oblong, 2.2–4.7 mm (0.087–0.185 in) long and brown.

== Taxonomy ==
Acacia latifolia was first formally described in 1842 by George Bentham in Hooker's London Journal of Botany. The specific epithet (latifolia) means 'broad-leaved'.

== Distribution and habitat ==
This species of wattle occurs in tropical Western Australia, the Northern Territory (including the Sir Edward Pellew Group of Islands) and the extreme north-west of Queensland. It grows on sandstone plateaux on cliffs near the ocean and along watercourses in gullies in crevices amongst boulders in mixed shrubland.

== Conservation status ==
Acacia latifolia is listed as 'not threatened' by the Government of Western Australia Department of Biodiversity, Conservation and Attractions, as 'least concern' under the Northern Territory Government Territory Parks and Wildlife Conservation Act and the Queensland Government Nature Conservation Act 1992.

== See also ==
- List of Acacia species
