= Skull Island =

Skull Island may refer to:

== Arts and entertainment ==
- Skull Island (King Kong), fictional island in the King Kong franchise.
- Kong: Skull Island, 2017 American film
- Skull Island (Braindead), in the 1992 film Braindead
- Skull Island (The Curse of Monkey Island), in the 1997 video game The Curse of Monkey Island
- Skull Island (TV series), 2023 animated series
- Skull Island: Reign of Kong, attraction at Universal's Islands of Adventure
- Skull Island: Rise of Kong, 2023 video game

== Geography ==
- Skull Island, a former island in Tulare Lake, California, US
- Skull Island, name given to Aureed Island, Queensland, Australia, in the 19th century
- Skull Island (Australia), in the Northern Territory of Australia
- Skull Island (New Brunswick), a small uninhabited Island in New Brunswick, Canada
- Skull Island (Tulare Lake), California, United States
- Skull Island (Washington), Washington State, US
- Skull Islet, a small islet in British Columbia, Canada
