= South West Island (Northern Territory) =

Island in Australia

Coordinates: 15.724°S 136.665°E

South West Island is an island in the Sir Edward Pellew Group in the Gulf of Carpentaria, Northern Territory, Australia. Its area is 81.27 square kilometres (31.38 sq mi). All of its population, numbering 10, lives in Wathanka (also called Wathunga), a family outstation on the north coast of South West Island.

The Sir Edward Pellew Group are the traditional lands of the Yanyuwa people, most of whom now live in Borroloola.

It is home to the canefield rat, which are few in number and considered a threatened species in this area, although plentiful in north-eastern Australia.
