= Pearce, Urquhart and Hervey Islands Important Bird Area =

Coordinates: 15°29′58″S 136°55′54″E

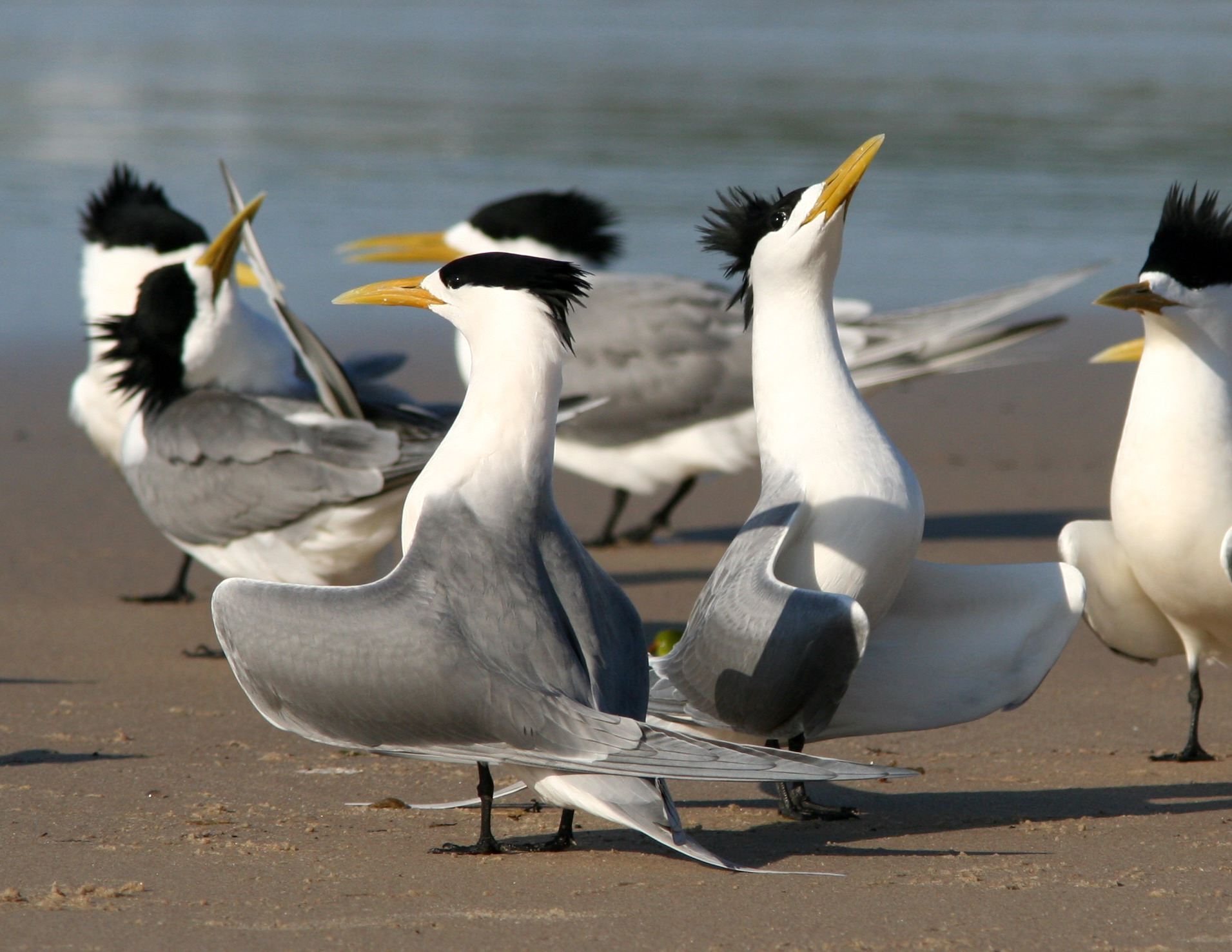
The IBA is an important site for greater crested terns

The Pearce, Urquhart and Hervey Islands Important Bird Area consists of three small adjacent islands, with a collective area of 9 ha, in the western Gulf of Carpentaria’s Sir Edward Pellew Group of Islands, in the Northern Territory of Australia. They lie to the north-east of the group's North Island.

== Description ==
The islands are traditionally owned Aboriginal land. Pearce Islet is covered with low vegetation. The circular Urquhart Islet is formed of rock and coral rubble and also vegetated. Hervey Rocks is a small, low, partly vegetated, rocky island with a small sand spit.

== Birds ==
The islands have been identified by BirdLife International as an Important Bird Area (IBA) because they support over 1% of the world populations of greater crested (with up to 50,000) and roseate terns (up to 17,500). Bridled and black-naped terns also breed on the islands, which are used for nesting by large numbers of sea turtles as well.
