= Walu people =

The Walu were an indigenous Australian people of the Gulf of Carpentaria in the Northern Territory.

== Country ==
The Walu were the native inhabitants of Vanderlin Island, covering an area which, in Norman Tindale's estimate, was about 100 square miles (260 km^{2}).

== People ==
Little is known of the Walu, since the only report Tindale could find was an article by W. G. Stretton dating back to 1893. Stretton, a long-time special magistrate at Borroloola writes of them in lurid terms. Recent research has begun to question both Stretton's paper, and Tindale's use of it in order to claim that the Vanderlin people were an independent tribe, as opposed to being a branch of the Yanyuwa. The modern Yanyuwa do not recognize this term in European ethnography as either a language name or ethnonym, and have suggested that it may be a distortion of a Yanyuwa term allu, signifying 'them/those others'.

== History of contact ==
Stretton thought the physical features of the Walu and surrounding tribes showed the impact of their trade and intercourse with Malayan traders. Sites with traces of the presence of Makassar traders are attested on the island. At the time of Stretton's writing, he numbered the tribe, which he called the Leewalloo at some 130 persons.

== Alternative names ==
- Walloo
- Leewalloo

== Sources ==
- Baker, Richard Munro (1999). Land Is Life: From Bush to Town - The Story of the Yanyuwa People. Allen & Unwin. ISBN 978-1-741-15072-8.
- Bradley, John James (1997). LI-ANTHAWIRRIYAR RA, people of the sea: Yanyuwa relations with their maritime environment (PDF). Northern Territory University PhD.
- Stretton, W. G. (1893). "Customs, rites and superstitions of the aboriginal tribes of the Gulf of Carpentaria" (PDF). Journal of the Royal Geographical Society of Australia (Adelaide Branch). 17: 227–253. Archived from the original (PDF) on 21 January 2018.
- Tindale, Norman Barnett (1974). "Walu(NT)". Aboriginal Tribes of Australia: Their Terrain, Environmental Controls, Distribution, Limits, and Proper Names. Australian National University. ISBN 978-0-708-10741-6.
