= Skull Island (Australia) =

Island in Northern Territory, Australia

Coordinates: 15°36′S 136°48′E

Skull Island is an island in the Northern Territory of Australia. It is a part of the Sir Edward Pellew Group of islands which lie within the Gulf of Carpentaria in the bay where the McArthur River flows, near King Ash Bay. It is known for good catches of tiger prawns.
