= Vanderlin Island =

Island of the Northern Territory, Australia

Coordinates: 15°44′S 137°02′E

Vanderlin Island is an island in the Gulf of Carpentaria, Northern Territory, Australia. It is the largest island in the Sir Edward Pellew Group. Its area is 264 km^{2} (102 sq mi). The island is part of the traditional lands of the Walu people.

The only settlements on the island are four family outstations along the west coast. They are, from north to south:

- Mooloowa
- Babungi
- Yulbara
- Uguie

Exact population figures are not known, but family outstations are typically four to six people, which results in a population of approximately 20 for the whole island. As of 2019, only one family (the Smiths), consisting of five persons, lived on Vanderlin Island.

== Illustrations ==
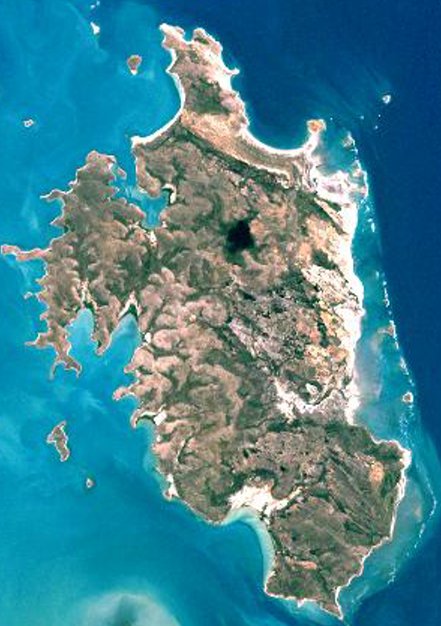
Landsat image of Vanderlin Island

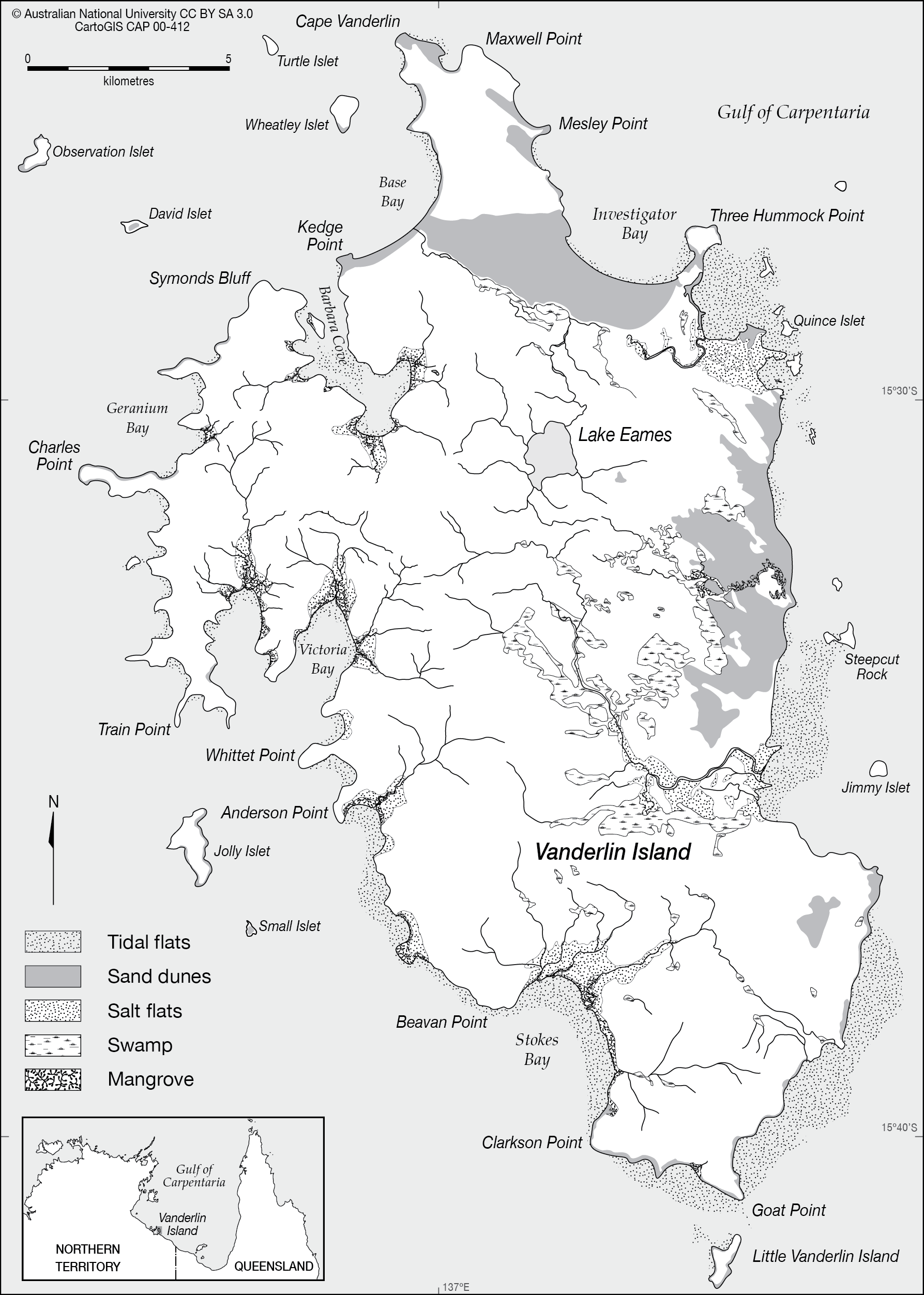
Sketch map of Vanderlin Island

== See also ==
- List of islands of Australia
