= Sir Edward Pellew Group of Islands =

Group of islands of Northern Territory, Australia

Coordinates: 15°40′S 136°48′E

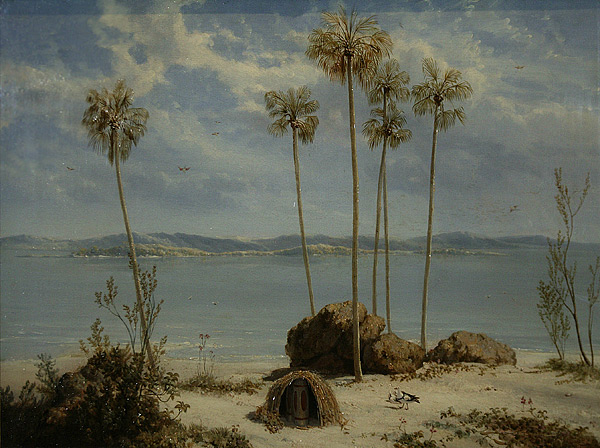
William Westall, of Sir Edward Pellew Group, Gulph of Carpentaria, 1802 (painted in 1811), Ministry of Defence Art Collection

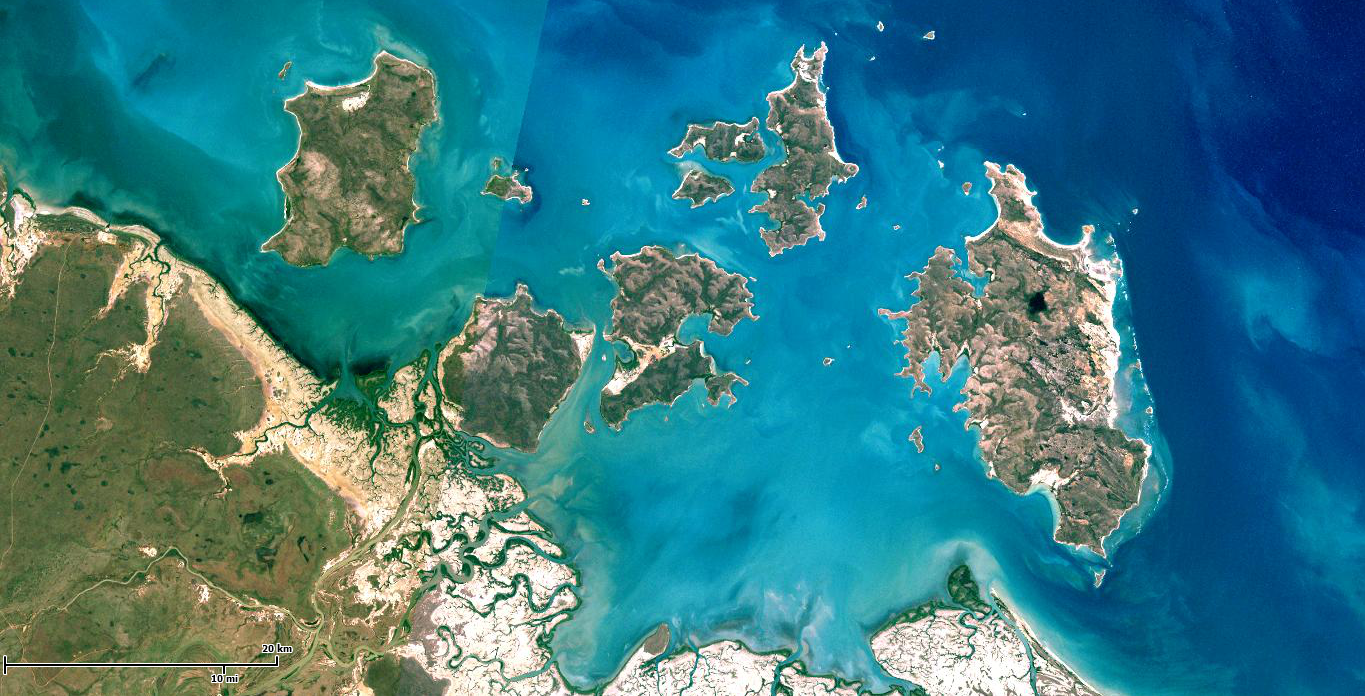
Natural Color LANDSAT image

The Sir Edward Pellew Group of Islands is situated in the south-west corner of the Gulf of Carpentaria, off the coast of the Northern Territory, Australia.

== History ==
They were named in 1802 by Matthew Flinders in honour of Sir Edward Pellew, a fellow naval officer. Although Flinders was the first British explorer to pass that way, his journals describe indications of some "foreign" people having visited beforehand. Flinders speculated that these visitors were Chinese. The islands were also sighted in 1644 by Abel Tasman who thought they were part of the mainland and called them "Cape Vanderlin".

== Description ==
The group includes Vanderlin Island, North Island, West Island, Centre Island and South West Island. Combined, the islands have a total area of 2100 square kilometres; the largest, Vanderlin Island, is 32 km long and 13 km across at its widest. Most islands are inhabited (some part-time) by the indigenous Yanyuwa people, and are also part of Wurralibi Aboriginal Land. Tourists may negotiate a fee to visit, camp, and fish there. North Island is home to the 5.41 km^{2} Barranyi (North Island) National Park and offers free camping, with drinking water and barbecue facilities located near Paradise Bay. The Pearce, Urquhart and Hervey Islands Important Bird Area, so identified by BirdLife International because of its importance as a breeding site for thousands of terns, comprises three small islands in the group and lies to the northeast of North Island.

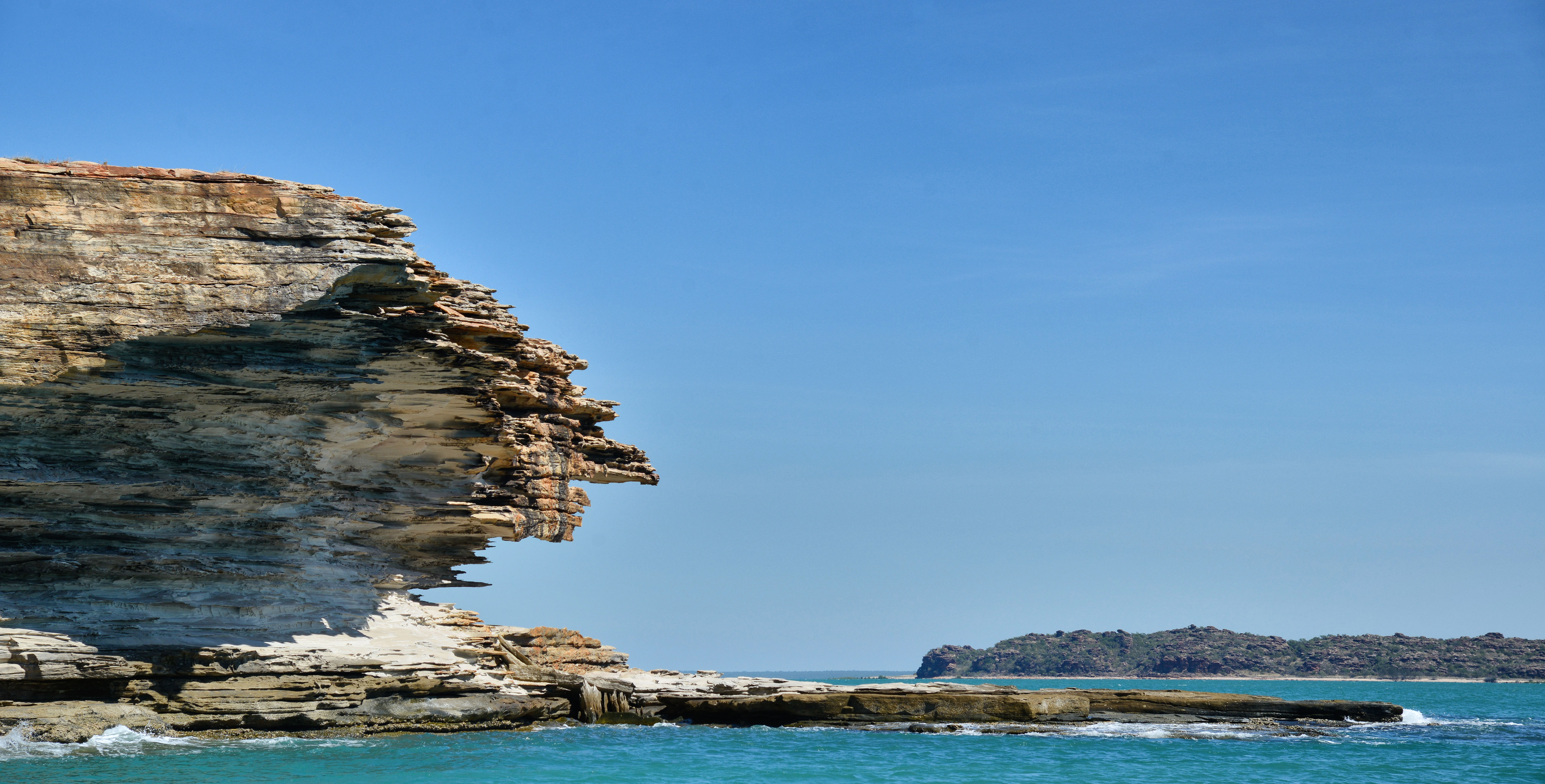
Rock formations on a small island within the group
