= Rail transport in Queensland =

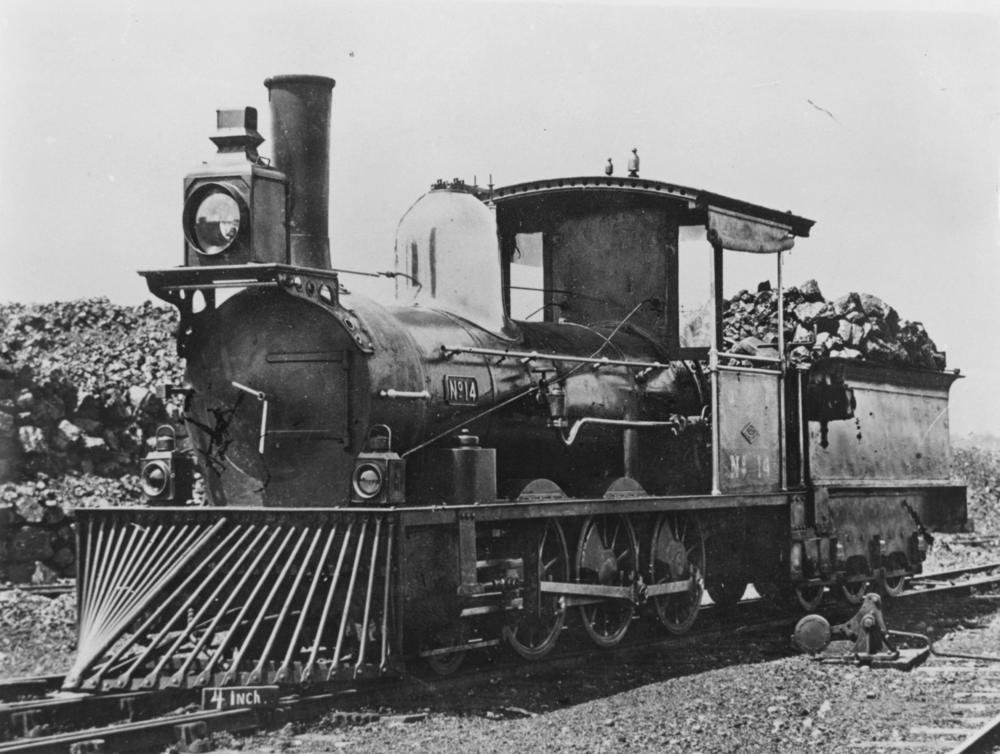
Queensland Rail B12 class steam locomotive No. 14 on the Central Line in 1878.

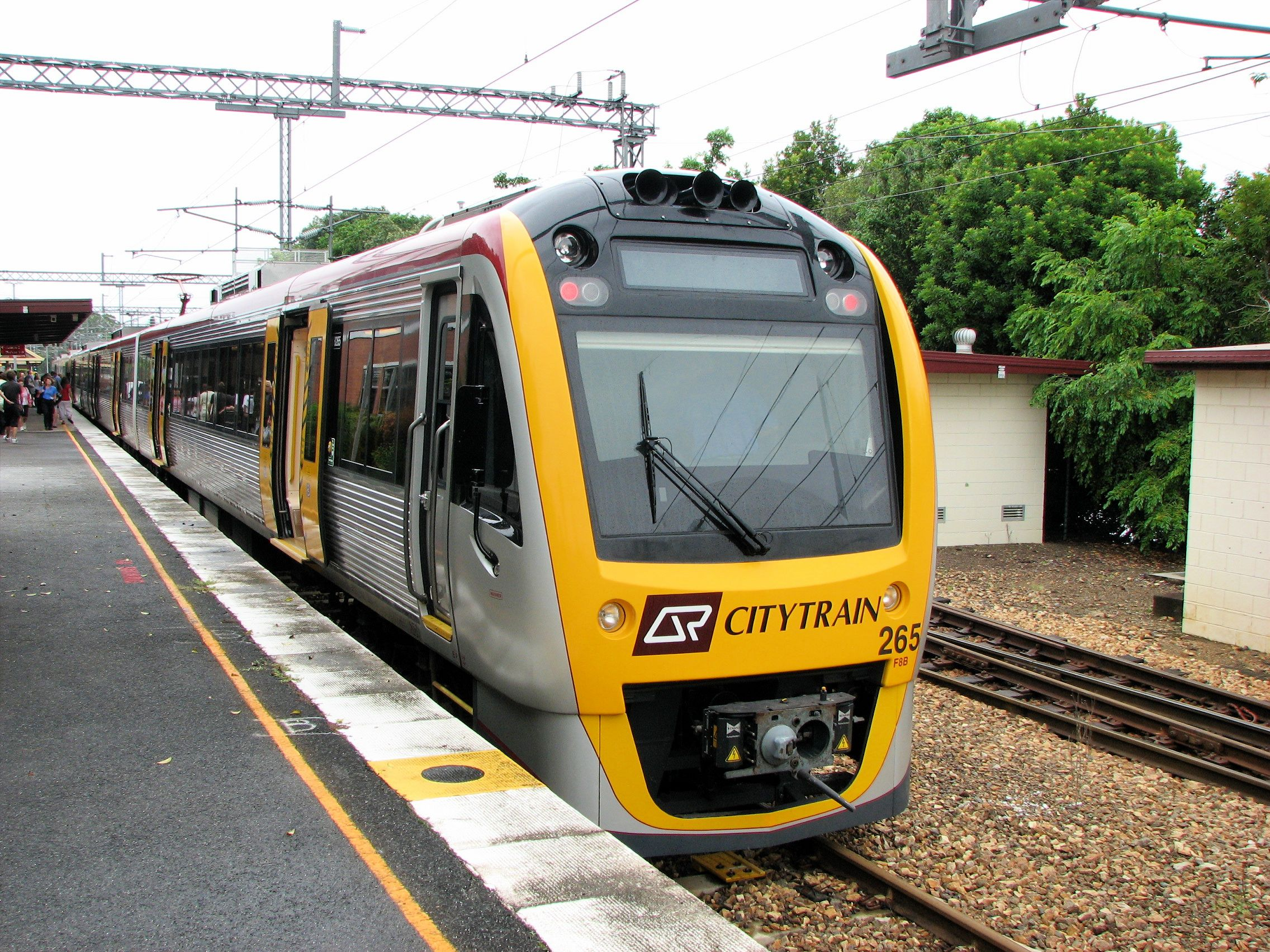
Queensland Rail SMU 265 at Nambour station on 10 March 2009.

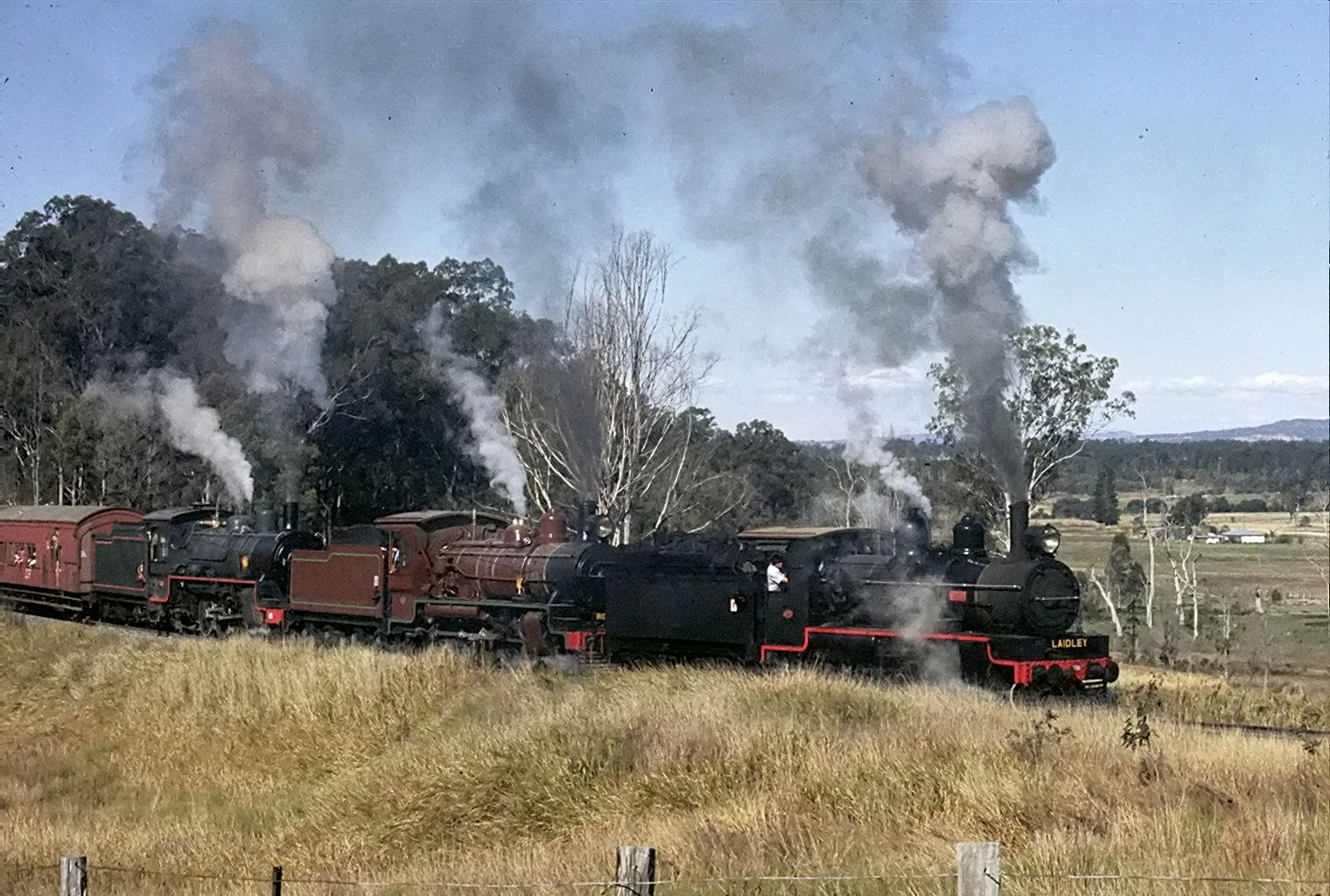
Queensland Rail heritage locos of the PB15, C17 and BB18¼ classes haul a special train for the 125th anniversary of QR on the Little Liverpool Range west of Grandchester, July 1990.

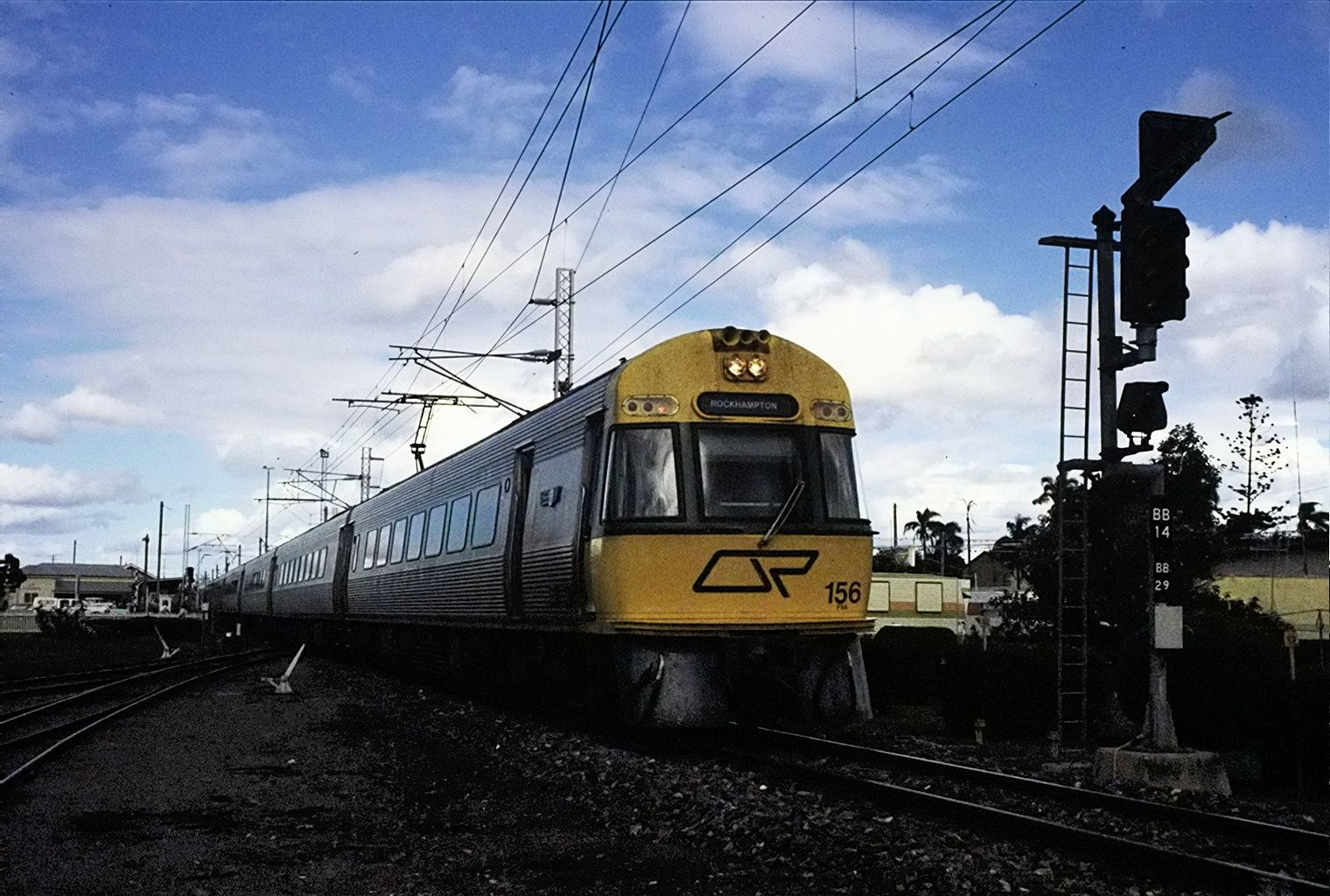
Northbound Spirit of Capricorn service at Bundaberg station, ~1989

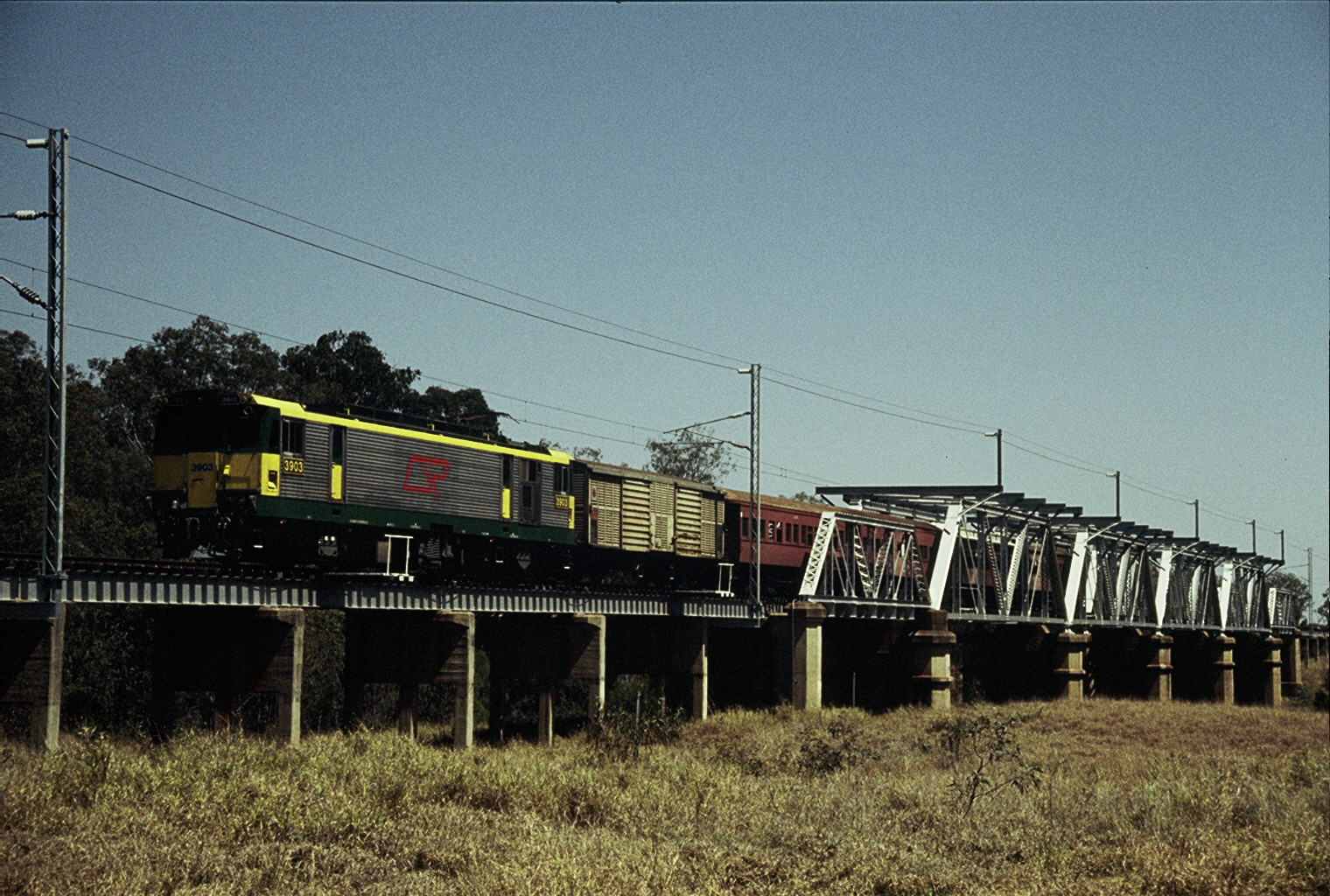
3903 hauls a special train east of Emerald on the Central Line, over the Nogoa River bridge, September 1989.

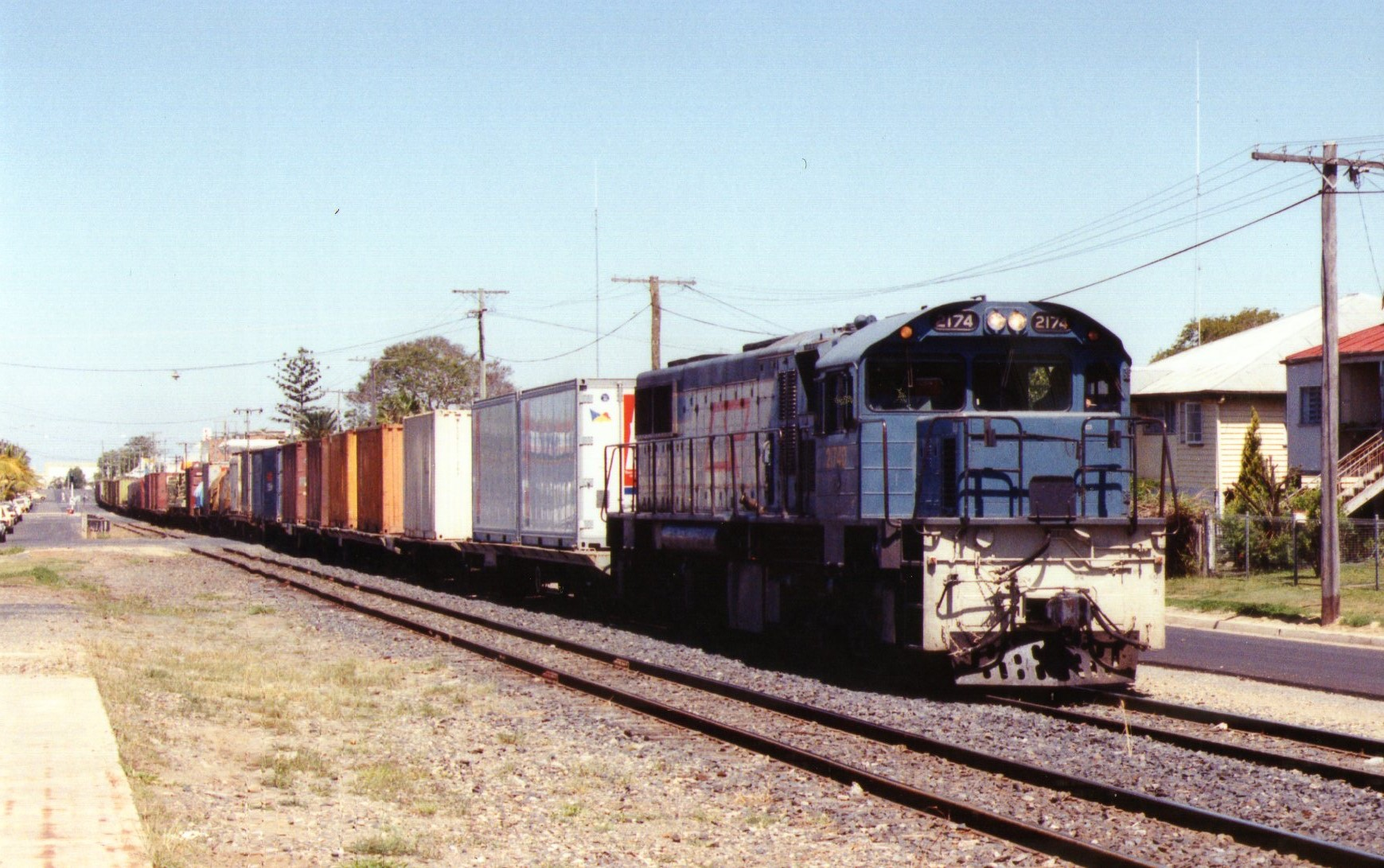
2174 hauls a northbound goods train on the Denison Street section of the North Coast Line in Rockhampton

The rail network in Queensland, Australia, was the first in the world to adopt 1,067 mm (3 ft 6 in) narrow gauge for a main line. In 2013, it claimed to be the second largest narrow gauge network in the world. The network consists of the following lines:

- the North Coast Line (NCL), extending 1,680 kilometres (1,040 mi) from Brisbane to Rockhampton, Townsville and Cairns
- four east–west lines (and associated branch lines), including:
  - the Western line from Brisbane to Toowoomba and Charleville
  - the Central Western line from Rockhampton to Longreach and Winton
  - the Mt Isa line from Townsville to Mount Isa
  - the Tablelands line from Cairns to Forsayth
- four export coal networks, including:
  - Moura to Gladstone
  - Blackwater to Gladstone
  - Goonyella to Hay Point
  - Newlands to Abbot Point
- the original narrow-gauge Southern line that provided a rail connection to Sydney, extending from Toowoomba to the New South Wales border at Wallangarra, plus the South Western line west from Warwick to Thallon;
- two lines extending south of Brisbane, a 140 km/h (87 mph) narrow gauge passenger line from Brisbane to the Gold Coast, and a 1,435 mm (4 ft 8 1/2 in) line to the New South Wales border connecting to the line to Sydney
- the isolated Normanton to Croydon line, now operated as a tourist service as The Gulflander
- the isolated 19 kilometres (12 mi) 4 ft 8 1/2 in (1,435 mm) private freight line at Weipa hauling bauxite from a mine to the export terminal
- over 3,000 km of 2 ft (610 mm) gauge sugar cane lines servicing 19 sugar mills (see Tramways section below).

Passenger services include:

- Long distance trains from:
  - Brisbane to Cairns
  - Townsville to Mount Isa
  - Brisbane to Longreach
  - Brisbane to Charleville
  - Brisbane to Sydney
- Translink network providing services:
  - north to Caboolture, Ferny Grove, Gympie North, Kippa-Ring and Nambour
  - east to Cleveland, Domestic Airport, Doomben and Shorncliffe
  - south to Beenleigh and Varsity Lakes
  - west to Ipswich, Rosewood, and Springfield.

The Translink network consists of approximately 300 km and 151 stations.

== History ==
=== Construction ===
Construction of the Queensland rail network began in 1864 with the first section of the Main Line railway from Ipswich to Grandchester being built. This was the first narrow-gauge main line constructed in the world and, in 2013, was claimed to be the second largest narrow-gauge railway network in the world.

=== Network extent ===
At its maximum extent in 1932, the system totalled ~10,500 km of routes open for traffic.

In 1925, QR employed ~18,000 people, 713 locomotives, 930 passenger carriages, ~16,000 goods wagons, hauled ~five million tons of goods and ~30 million passengers, and made a return on capital of 3.2% before depreciation.

=== Electrification ===
Three significant electrification programs have been undertaken in Queensland which include the Brisbane suburban network, the Blackwater and Goonyella coal networks, and the Caboolture to Gladstone section of the North Coast line.

=== Public float ===
On 2 June 2009, the Queensland Government announced the 'Renewing Queensland Plan', with Queensland Rail's commercial activities to be separated from the Government's core passenger service responsibilities. The commercial activities were formed into a new company called QR National Limited. The new structure was announced by the Queensland Government on 2 December 2009, and took place from 1 July 2010.

== Infrastructure ==
=== Track gauge ===
The nascent Queensland Railways was persuaded that the way to reduce the cost of railway construction was to use a narrower gauge than the standard gauge of 4 ft 8 1/2 in (1,435 mm). A prototype existed in Norway, but Queensland became the first rail operator in the world to adopt narrow gauge for a main line. The proposed 3 ft 6 in (1,067 mm) gauge railway involved a 5 long tons (5.1 t; 5.6 short tons) axle load and very sharp curves of 5 chains (100.58 metres) radius on the long climb to Toowoomba at about 610 metres (2,000 ft) above sea level. The maximum gradient was 1 in 50 (2%) uncompensated, which combined with a 5 chains (100.58 metres) radius curve gives an equivalent grade of 1 in 41 (about 2.5%). Although the proposed railway could only manage a top speed of 20 mph (32 km/h), that was claimed to be sufficient for a hundred years.

One of the main advantages of a narrow gauge railway is that the earthworks required do not have to be as extensive as on railways of larger gauge. It was estimated that the cost of this standard of railway would be 25% of the cost of a standard gauge line built to the minimum standard considered possible with that gauge at the time. This was a vital consideration since the colony of Queensland had a non-indigenous population of about 30,000 at the time. Standard gauge branch lines were later constructed in NSW with 5 chains (100.58 metres) radius curves and had the same low maximum speed.

The choice of the non-standard 3 ft 6 in (1,067 mm) gauge, approved very narrowly by parliament, was and still is controversial. Thus the die was cast for a large narrow-gauge system, which was copied by three other Australian states as well as a number of other countries. Queensland's decision to use narrow gauge was influential on New Zealand's decision to adopt narrow gauge as its uniform gauge in 1870.

A hundred and fifty years later, Queensland is still sparsely populated (5.5 million in 2024), but many trains hauling coal are some of the longest and heaviest in the world, with Aurizon currently trialling coal trains of 25,000 tonne gross load that are ~4.5 km long.

=== Rack railway ===
QR had one rack railway, with grades as steep as 1 in 16.5 (6%), which was on the branch to Mount Morgan. It was bypassed by a conventional line in 1951 with grades of 1 in 50 (2%). The bypass closed in 1987. The rack system was the Abt rack system, the same type used by the Mount Lyell Railway in Tasmania.

== Operators ==
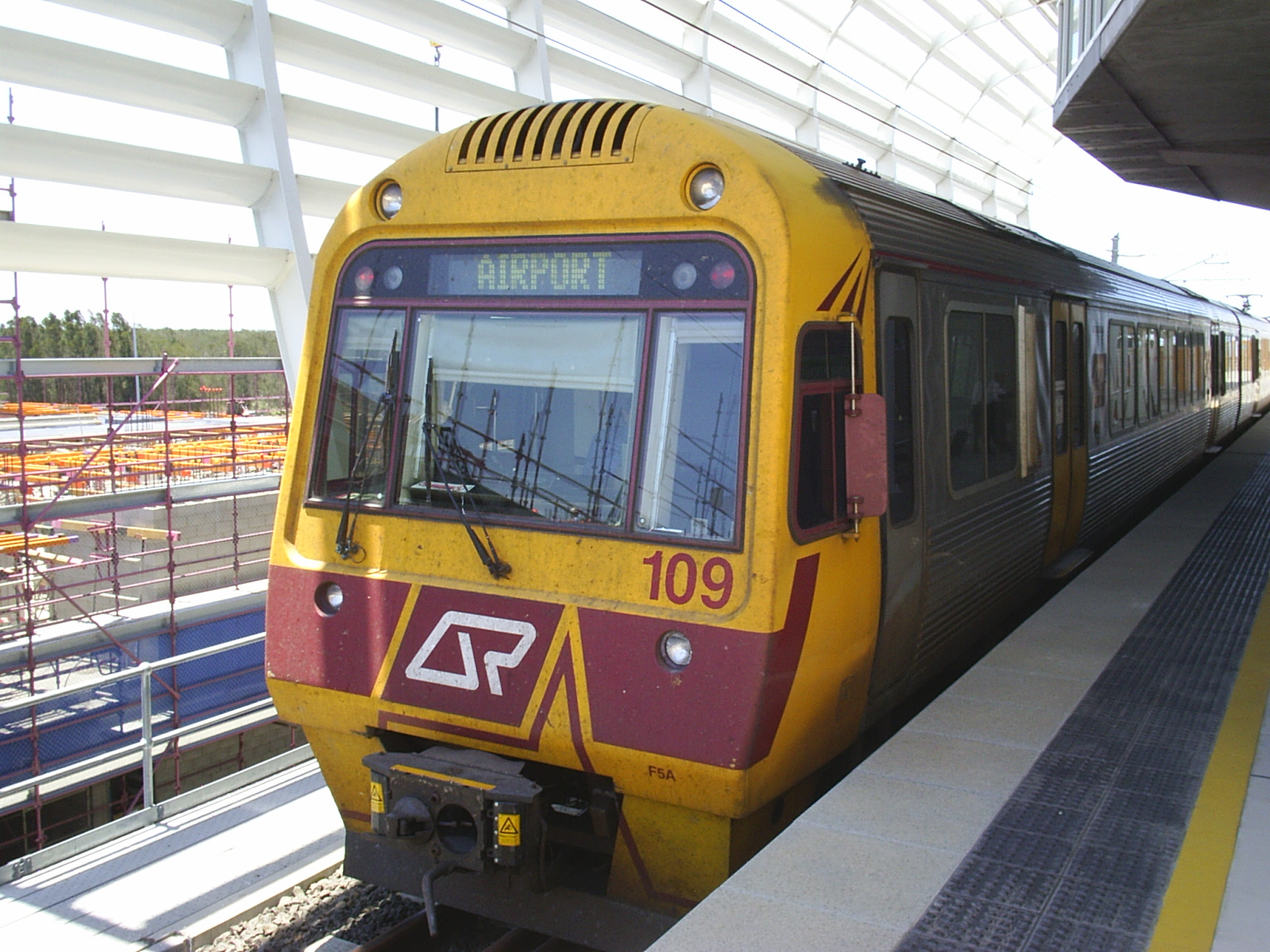
IMU 109 at the International Airport on its way to the Domestic Terminal

Historically, the government-owned Queensland Rail has been the main rail operator in Queensland. The exception has been the standard-gauge link from New South Wales into Brisbane. When opened in 1930, it was operationally a part of the New South Wales system and run by that government-owned railway, under agreement with Queensland which owned the line. From 1994, National Rail took over the operation of virtually all standard-gauge freight services to and from Brisbane, as part of a reorganisation of interstate freight in Australia.

In 2002, QR entered the standard-gauge market through subsidiary Interail, by 2004, it was running freight services from Brisbane through to Melbourne. Today, standard-gauge freight services are operated by Pacific National after its acquisition of National Rail, and Aurizon (formerly a Queensland Rail subsidiary, QR National).

On the narrow gauge, Queensland Rail operates all passenger services. In 2005, the first non-QR narrow gauge commercial rail operation started in Queensland, with Pacific National commencing operation of container services between Brisbane and Cairns, followed in 2009 by their entry into the export coal market. Queensland Rail's subsidiary Australian Railroad Group have also entered the Queensland narrow-gauge freight market, operating trains between Townsville and Mount Isa in its own right. Standard-gauge passenger services are provided by the New South Wales Government's NSW TrainLink using its XPT.

=== Airtrain ===
The Airport railway line opened to passengers in May 2001. Under a BOOT scheme – build, own, operate and transfer – the Queensland Government licensed Airtrain Citylink to build the rail line, to own and operate it, and hand the entire infrastructure over to the Queensland Government after 35 years when the company will then cease to exist. Airtrain Citylink contracted Transfield Services to build, operate and maintain the line and finally Airtrain Citylink contracted Queensland Rail to provide rolling stock for the rail line.

=== Aurizon ===
In 2010, the Queensland government privatised the narrow gauge freight haulage and all standard gauge components of Queensland National. In 2012, the organisation renamed itself Aurizon.

=== Pacific National ===
In March 2005, Pacific National Queensland became the first non-Queensland Rail narrow gauge commercial rail operation in Queensland, with the commencement of container services between Brisbane and Cairns. They now operate intermodal services to various destinations along the coast of Queensland. In 2018 they became responsible for sugar haulage in Central and North Queensland.

=== Watco Australia ===
On 16 August 2019, Watco Australia announced that the first two of eight WRA Class locomotives units were being delivered to Australia. The company have stated that they would begin operations in the fourth quarter of 2019. WRA001 and 002 arrived at the Port of Brisbane on the vessel Tarago on 9 October 2019 and were transferred to Warwick behind QR locomotive 1724.

=== BHP Mitsubishi Alliance ===
BHP Mitsubishi Alliance (BMA) is a 50/50 partnership between the two named companies, operating 9 coal mines in the Bowen Basin. BMA Rail was authorised to operate on the Goonyella coal network from 1 January 2014, and purchased 13 Siemens E40 AG-V1 electric locomotives, designated as the BMACC class, numbered BMACC001-BMACC013. It has the potential to operate its own trains if contract haulage rates from either Aurizon or Pacific National are unacceptable.

== Tramways ==
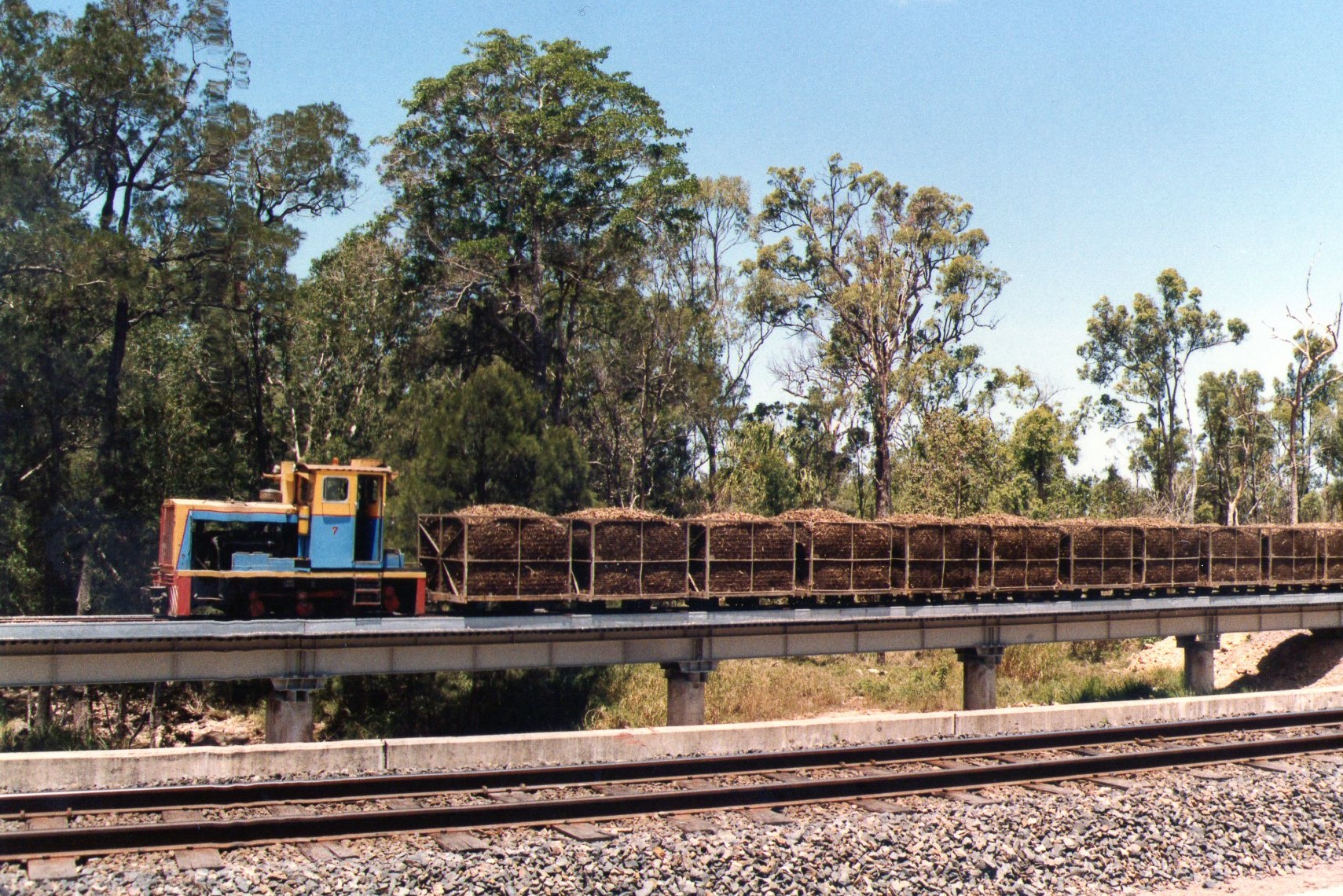
A 2 ft (610 mm) gauge sugar cane train runs parallel to the North Coast Line near Mackay

Except where noted, this section relates to sugar cane lines in Queensland built to narrower than 3 ft 6 in (1,067 mm) gauge, and in this section the term ‘narrow gauge’ means a gauge less than 3 ft 6 in (1,067 mm). Non sugar cane tramways covered by their own entries are:

- Aramac Tramway
- Ballara Tramway
- Beaudesert Shire Tramway
- Belmont Tramway
- Buderim Tramway
- Cooloola Tramway
- Innisfail Tramway
- Laheys Tramway
- Mapleton Tramway
- Mill Point Settlement Site
- Stannary Hills Tramways
- Munro Tramway

Sugar cane tramways were usually developed in conjunction with sugar mills as the major transport system for conveying harvested sugar cane for processing. As this is a seasonal traffic, minimising cost was a significant consideration, and the adoption of 2 ft (610 mm) gauge enabled lines to be laid with minimal earthworks, sharp curves, and sometimes temporarily in cane fields so cut cane can be loaded directly onto wagons.

=== History ===
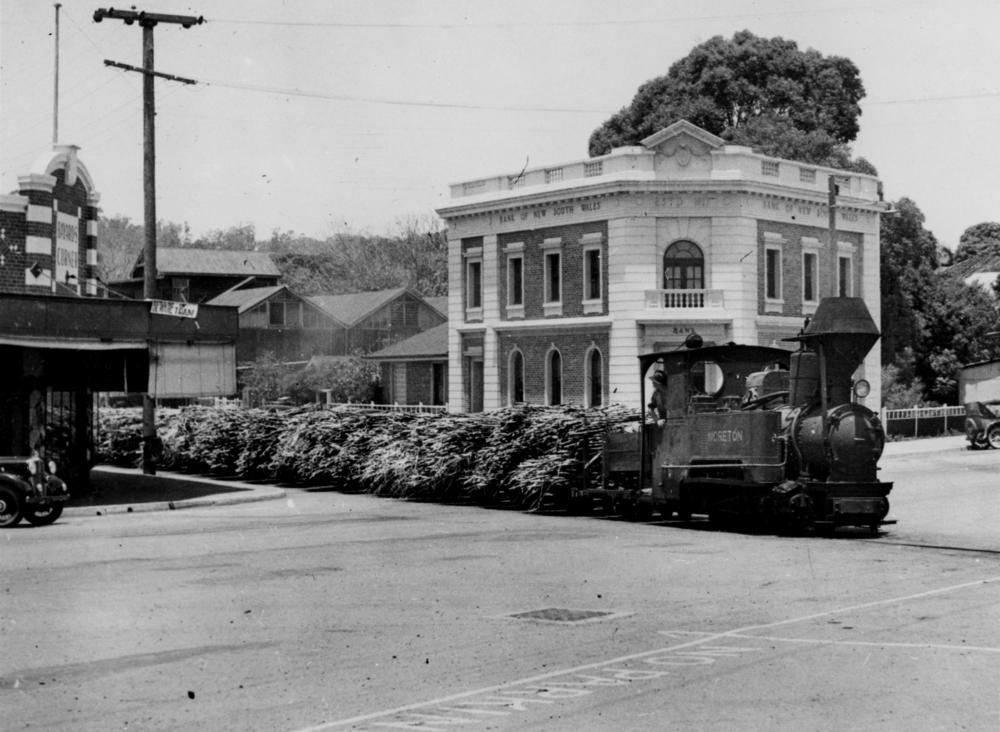
Sugar cane train travelling along Currie Street, Nambour, ca. 1939

The first recorded use of a locomotive hauled tramway for sugar cane transport in Queensland was at a plantation at Morayfield (now an outer suburb of Brisbane) in 1866 using 3 ft (914 mm) gauge. The plantation was not a success, however another tramway built at Maryborough in the same year was successful.

A 3 ft 6 in (1,067 mm) gauge tramway was established at the Pioneer Mill near Ayr in 1875, and in 1881 a 50-mile (80 km) tramway network had been established to service CSR Homebush and Victoria mills. The Herbert mill had an 8-mile (13 km) network by 1882, and further tram networks were established as the sugar industry expanded, all 2 ft (610 mm) gauge with the exception of the Pioneer Mill system.

In 1911 the Queensland Railway Department built a tramway from Chinchilla to Wongongera (now Barakula) to transport railway sleepers made from logs taken from the state forest at Barakula and milled at the Barakula sawmill (approx 26.4279°S 150.5044°E). The route of the Barakula tramway was based on an earlier plan to construct a railway line from Chinchilla to Taroom that was subsequently abandoned in favour of a railway line from Miles to Taroom. The tramway operated until 1970.

At the end of World War I surplus equipment that had been used to rail supplies to the trenches was used to expand the sugar cane networks.

Originally cane was harvested by hand, and the ‘standard’ 4 wheel wagon was loaded by stacking the ~2 m lengths of cane between upright stakes.

In the 1950s mechanical harvesting was introduced, and cane ‘bins’ were required to hold the ~200 mm lengths (‘billets’) of cane produced by that harvesting process. Most cane bins are 4 wheel with a 4–6 tonne capacity, but some mills utilise bogie bins with a capacity of ~10 tonnes.

Diesel mechanical and diesel hydraulic locomotives replaced steam locomotives in the 1950s and 1960s. Cane must be processed within 12 hours of harvest for maximum yield, so the transportation timing dictated the size of a cane tramway network when mills were first established. When diesel locomotives were introduced, their increased utilisation rates enabled the size of a potential network to grow, resulting in the rationalisation of both the tramways and a reduction in the number of mills. Today some of the ‘main lines’ of tramways are of a standard equivalent to a 3 ft 6 in (1,067 mm) gauge main line, with (in some cases) concrete sleepers, ballast and heavy rail allowing relatively high speed transport of the cane from further distances whilst still meeting the 12-hour ‘delivery from harvest’ timeframe.

Queensland Railways sold a closed branchline in 1964 to the Gin Gin Cooperative Mill in Gin Gin which converted it to a 2 ft (610 mm) sugar tramway.

With the development of higher standard road networks, some mills have converted to road transport for some or (in a few cases) all cane delivery.

Nambour, about 100 km north of Brisbane had a sugar tram network until 2003, when the mill closed due to plantations being sold for urban development reducing the district crop harvest to an unviable size. The Rocky Point Mill situated about 50 km south of Brisbane had a 5-mile (8 km) tramway which opened in 1924 and closed following flood damage in 1951. Road transport has been used for that mill since then.

=== Current situation ===
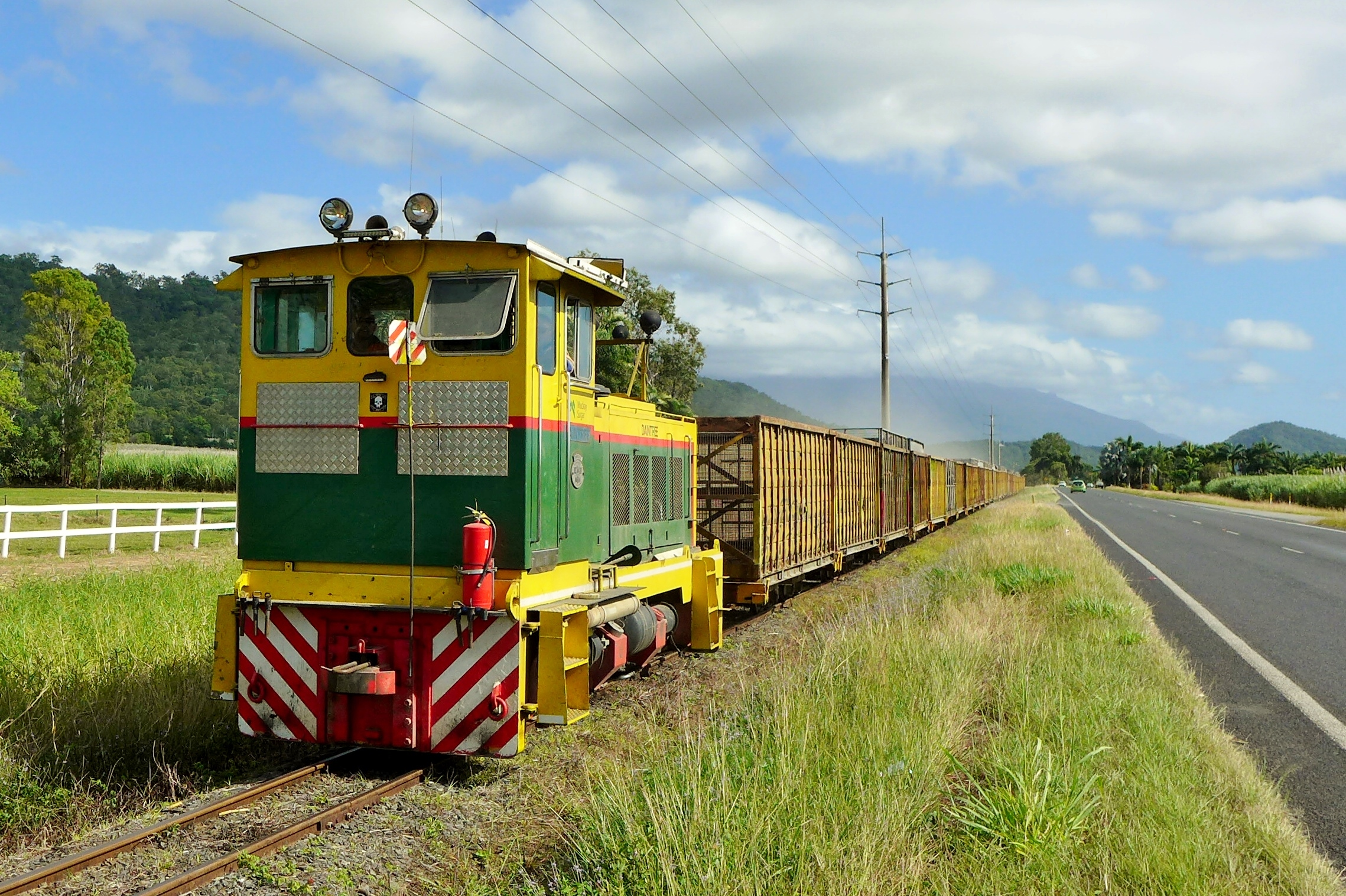
Sugar cane train serving the Mossman mill, 2015

In 2014 there were 19 sugar cane systems (18 of which use 2 ft or 610 mm gauge) with a combined trackage of 3,000 kilometres (1,900 mi) hauling approximately 36M tonnes of sugar cane each season. The average distance cane is hauled is 35 km, with the longest line being 119 km. Average speed is 40 km/h (due to the wagons not having brakes), and the maximum load is 2000 tonnes, being 1 km long.

It is understood the Pioneer Mill is considering converting its network to 610 mm (2 ft) gauge to enable it to more easily procure rolling stock and to facilitate greater efficiency of operations with two neighbouring mills, which currently share 25 km of dual gauge track.

Contemporary sugar cane tramways are quite advanced technically, utilising relatively heavy rails cascaded second hand from other operators, remote-controlled brake vans, concrete sleepers (in places), ballast and tamping machines. The 19 separate tramways cooperate in research and development.

In the 2020s, railway enthusiast volunteers are making efforts to preserve Queensland's sugar cane tramway history. However, they are few in number, have limited resources, and many of the tramway relics have already disappeared. When a sugar mill closes, the owner or operator is often obliged to remove everything, and another difficulty is that tramway lines often run through privately owned farms.

In 2024 the so-called Inland Railway from Melbourne to Brisbane is under construction which will provide a dual gauge replacement for the sharp curved and steeply graded narrow gauge line from Helidon to Toowoomba.

== Rolling stock ==
=== Passenger ===
==== City network fleet ====
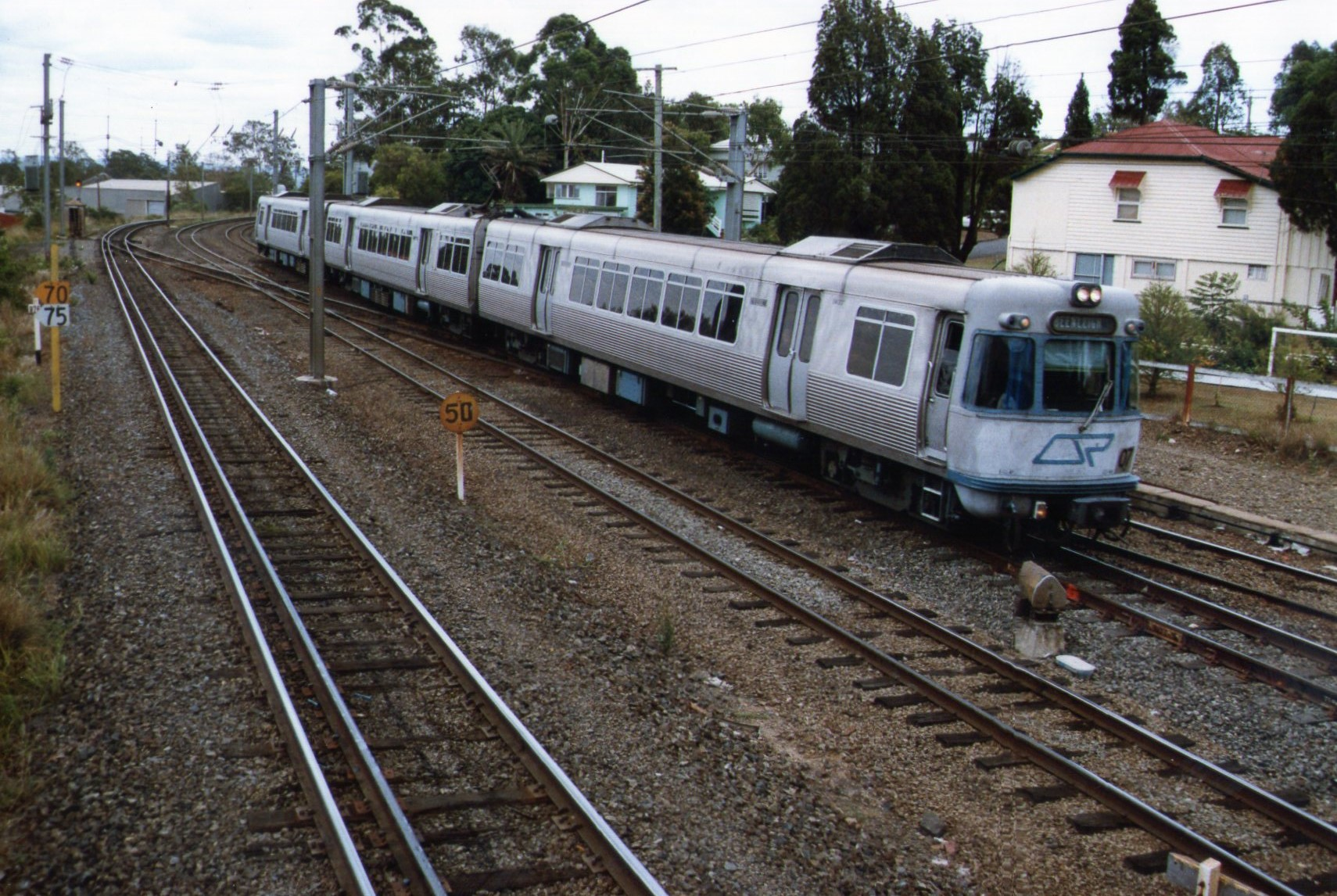
EMU 07 in original colour scheme at Rocklea, 1987 with the dual gauge line in the foreground

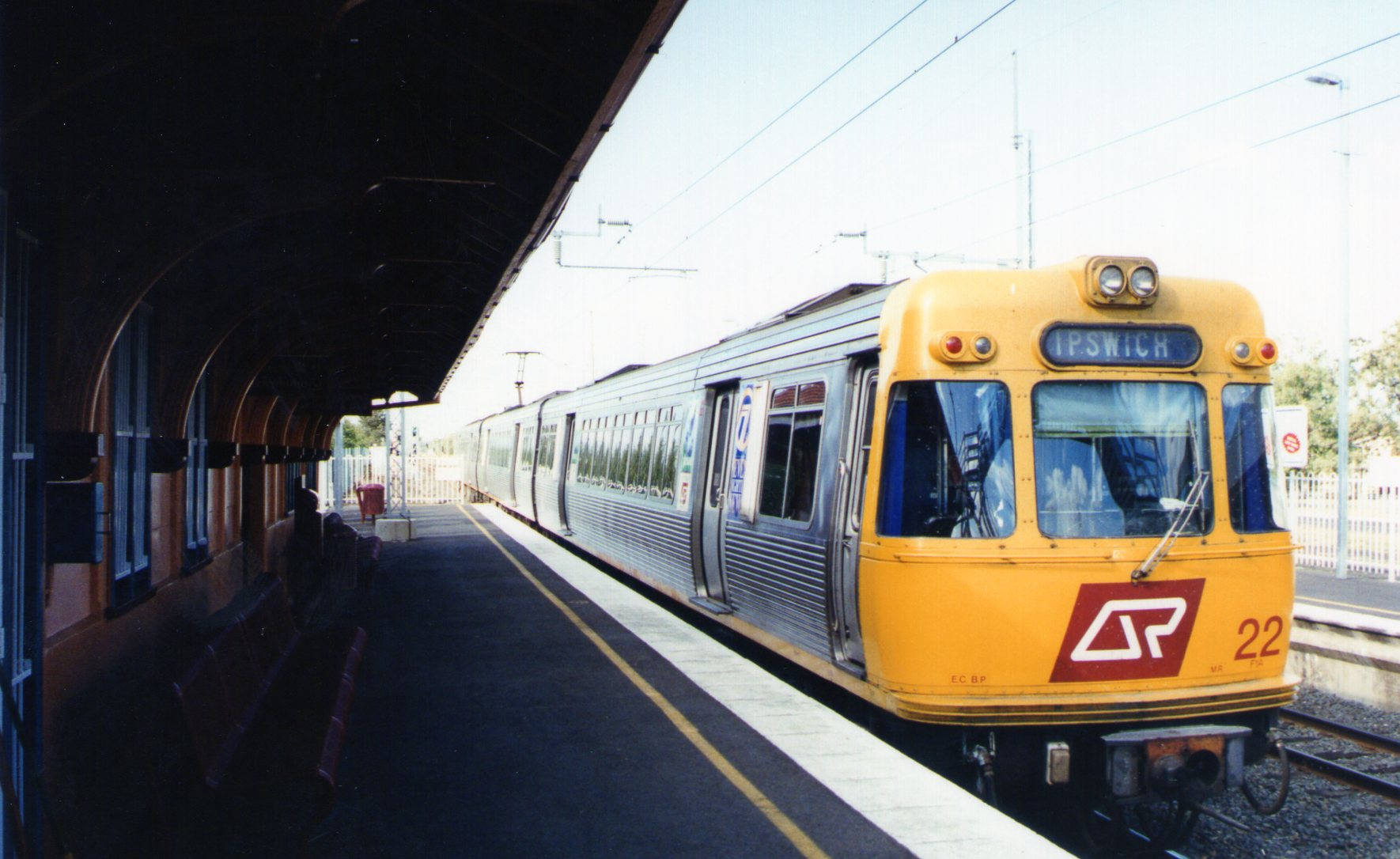
QR EMU unit 22 on a westbound train at Oxley station, 1999

All of the Queensland Rail City Network rolling stock is electric and air conditioned.

- Suburban Multiple Unit (SMU)
  - 200 Series (SMU200) – 12 in service (12 built)
  - 220 Series (SMU220) – 30 in service (30 built)
  - 260 Series (SMU260) – 36 in service (36 built)
- Interurban Multiple Unit (IMU)
  - 100 Series (IMU100) – 10 in service (10 built)
  - 120 Series (IMU120) – 4 in service (4 built)
  - 160 Series (IMU160) – 28 in service (28 built)
- New Generation Rollingstock (NGR)
  - 700 Series – 75 in service
- Queensland Train Manufacturing Program (QTMP)
  - XXX Series – 65 to be manufactured by Downer/Hyundai Rotem

==== Traveltrain fleet ====
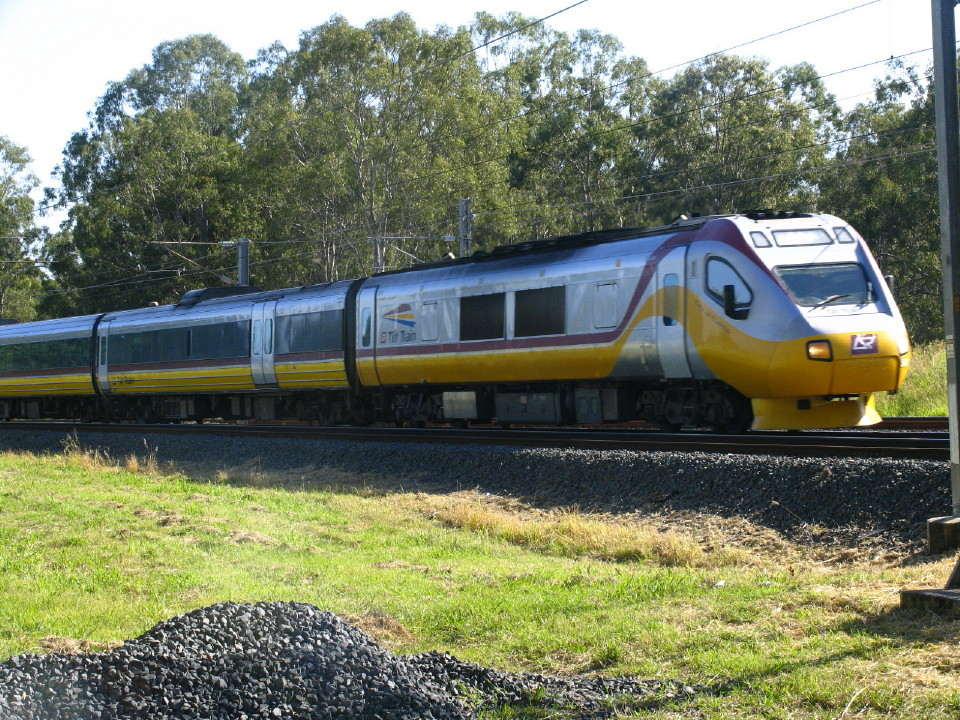
One of the two Diesel Tilt Trains in Queensland

Traveltrain services mainly cater to a tourist market.

- Locomotive hauled trains
  - The Electric Tilt Train operating from Brisbane to Rockhampton
  - The Spirit of Queensland, operating from Brisbane to Cairns
  - The Spirit of the Outback operating from Brisbane to Longreach
  - The Inlander operating from Townsville to Mount Isa
  - The Westlander operating from Brisbane to Charleville
  - The Kuranda Scenic Railway operating from Cairns to Kuranda
- Rail motor trains
  - The Gulflander, a rail motor operating on the Normanton to Croydon line
  - The Savannahlander, a rail motor operating from Cairns to Forsayth

=== History ===
Queensland's first premier passenger service was the Sydney Mail, introduced in 1888 when the New South Wales line opened to Wallangarra. From 1923 it included a Parlour Car. The Parlour Car was transferred to the Townsville Mail in 1930 following the opening of the 1,435 mm (4 ft 8 1/2 in) standard gauge line from Sydney to Brisbane.

The Sunshine Express was introduced between Brisbane and Cairns, being the first completely roller-bearing equipped train in Australia.

The Inlander was the first train in Australia with air-conditioned sleeping cars.

The Spirit of the Outback replaced the Capricornian and the Midlander.

The Spirit of Queensland replaced the Sunlander, a locomotive hauled train that was withdrawn in 2014.

== See also ==
- Rail transport in South East Queensland
- Rail transport in Australia
- List of tramways in Queensland
- Railway accidents in Queensland
