= Wooloowin railway station =

Railway station in Queensland, Australia

Wooloowin
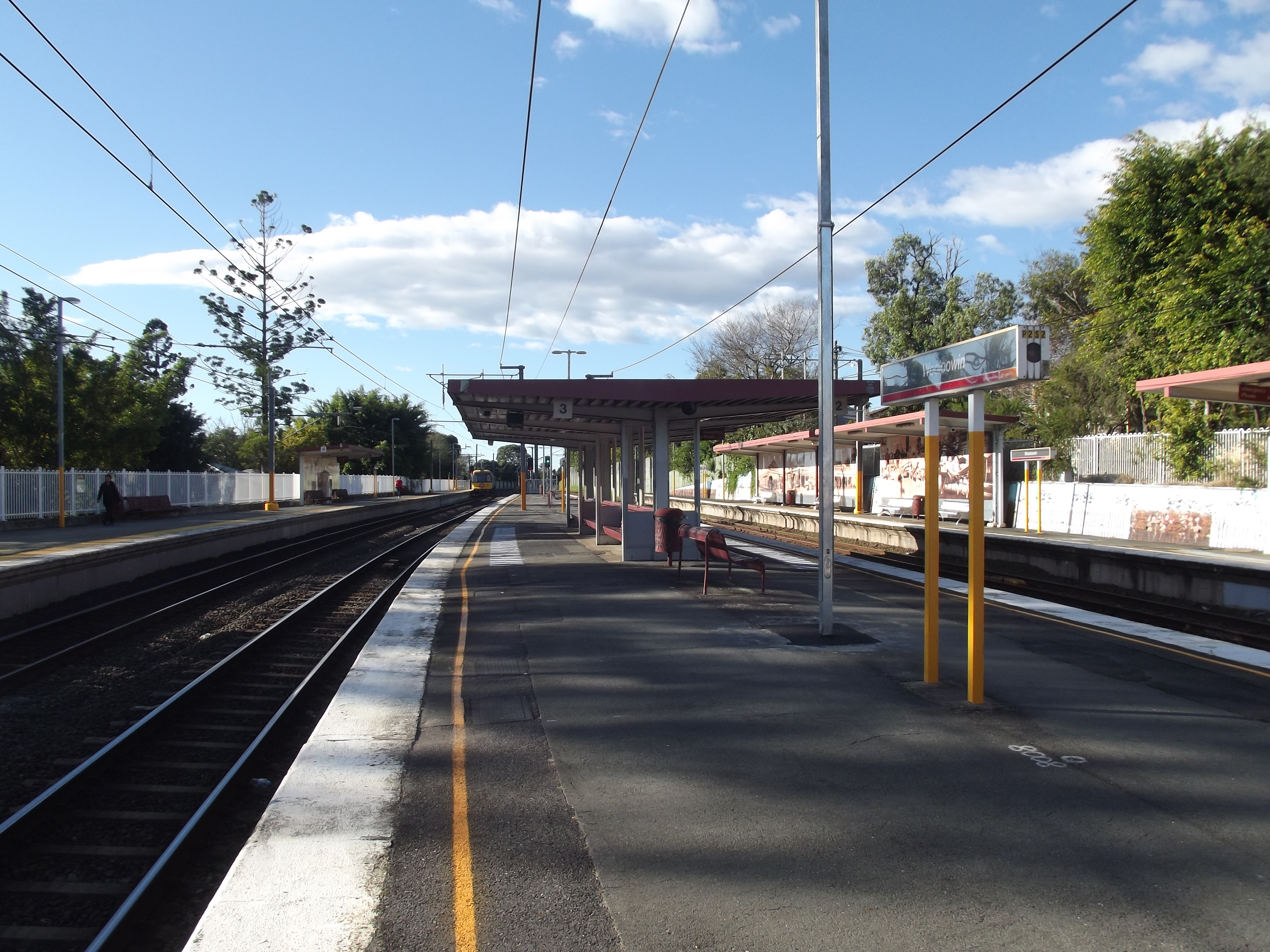
- Northbound view from Platform 3 in July 2012

General information
- Location: Hudson Road, Wooloowin
- Coordinates: 27°25′12″S 153°02′36″E
- Elevation: 21 m (69 ft)
- Owner: Queensland Rail
- Operator: Queensland Rail
- Lines: T5 Brisbane Airport; T3 Doomben; T4 Shorncliffe
- Distance: 5.63 kilometres from Central
- Platforms: 4 (2 side, 1 island)

Construction
- Structure type: Ground
- Parking: 189
- Accessible: Yes

Other information
- Status: Staffed
- Station code: 600391 (platform 1); 600392 (platform 2); 600393 (platform 3); 600394 (platform 4)
- Fare zone: Zone 1
- Website: Queensland Rail

History
- Opened: 11 May 1882; 144 years ago
- Former names: Lutwyche

Services
Preceding station	Queensland Rail	Following station
Albion towards Varsity Lakes	Brisbane Airport line	Eagle Junction towards Domestic Airport
Albion towards Roma Street	Doomben line	Eagle Junction towards Doomben
Albion towards Cleveland	Shorncliffe line	Eagle Junction towards Shorncliffe
Location

Wooloowin is a railway station operated by Queensland Rail on the Airport, Doomben and Shorncliffe lines. It opened in 1882 and serves the Brisbane suburb of Wooloowin. It is a ground level station, featuring one island platform with two faces and two side platforms.

== History ==
Prior to 1899 the station was named Lutwyche. Station buildings were completed in 1901.

On 29 November 1999, two extra platforms opened as part of the quadruplication of the line from Bowen Hills to Northgate.

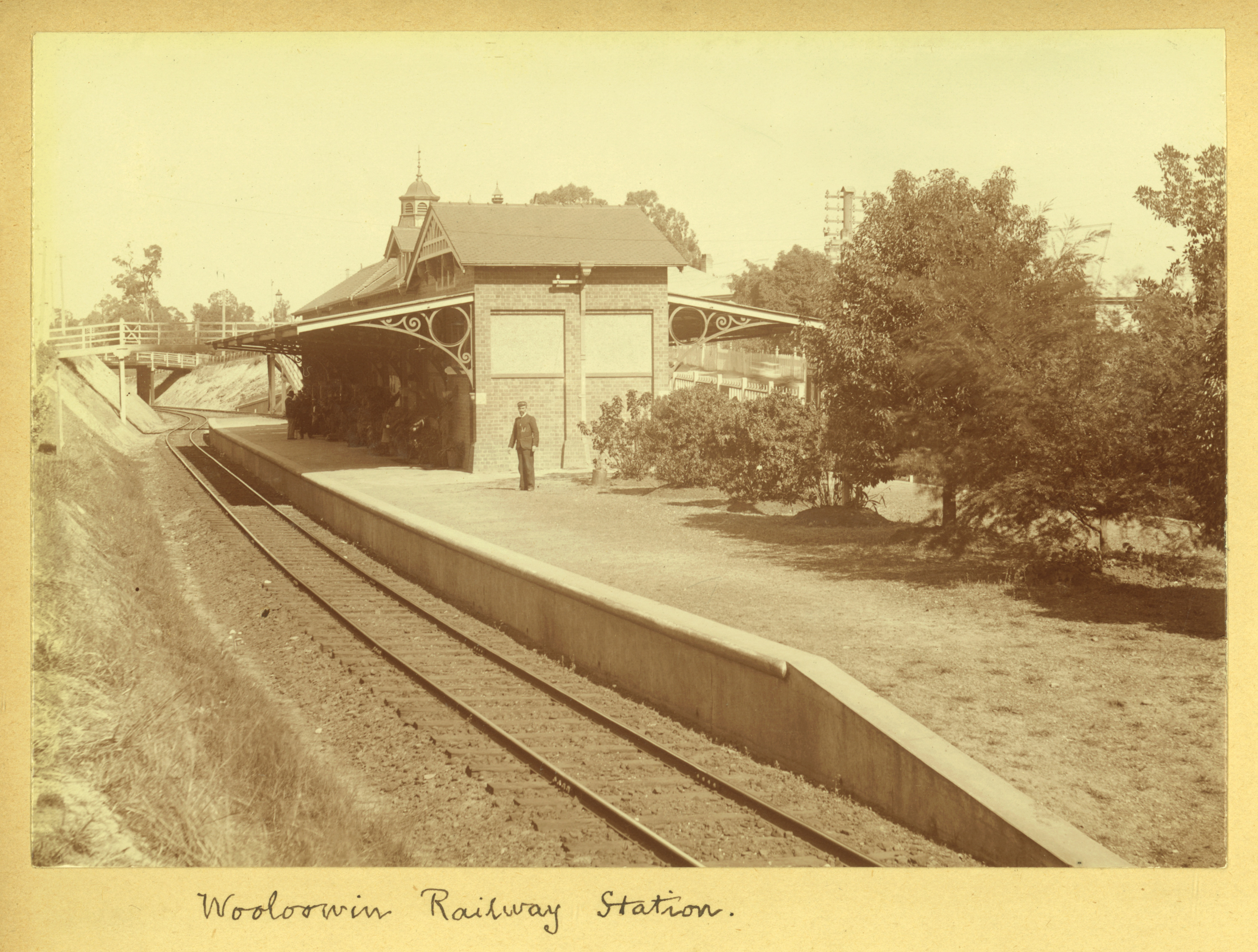
Wooloowin railway station ca. 1910

== Services ==
Wooloowin station is served daily by the Airport, Doomben and Shorncliffe lines. Also see Inner City timetable

== Platforms and services ==
Wooloowin platform arrangement
Platform	Line	Destination	Notes
1	T5 Brisbane Airport	Roma Street (to Varsity Lakes line)	
1	T3 Doomben	Roma Street	
1	T3 Doomben	Roma Street (to Cleveland line)	Evening peak only
1	T4 Shorncliffe	Roma Street (to Cleveland line)	
2	T5 Brisbane Airport	Domestic Airport	
2	T3 Doomben	Doomben	
2	T4 Shorncliffe	Shorncliffe	
3	No scheduled services		
4	No scheduled services		
