= Eagle Junction railway station =

Railway station in Queensland, Australia

Eagle Junction
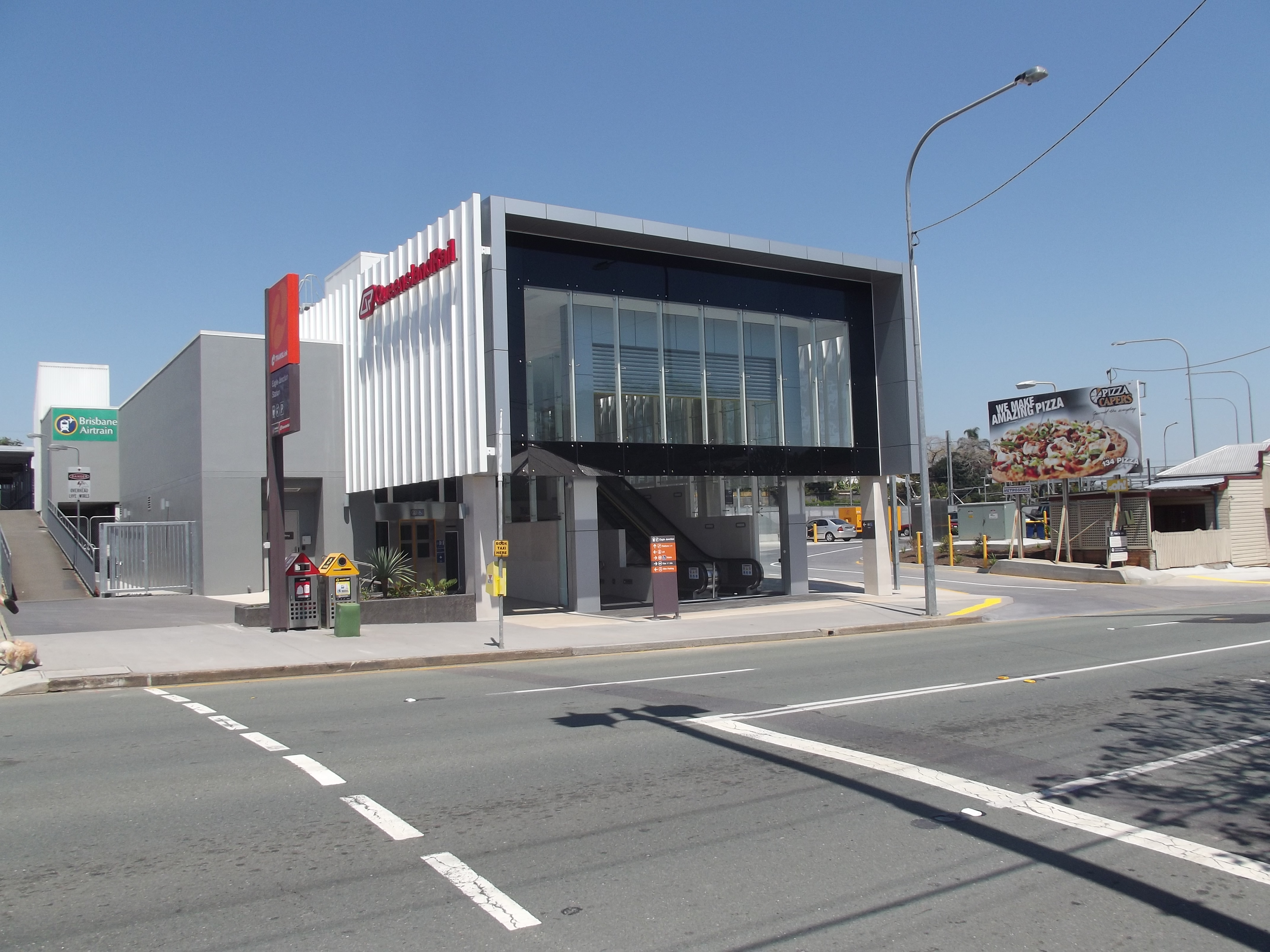
- Station building and entrance in October 2012

General information
- Location: Junction Road, Clayfield
- Coordinates: 27.4153°S 153.0505°E
- Owner: Queensland Rail
- Operator: Queensland Rail
- Lines: T5 Brisbane Airport; T1 Caboolture; T3 Doomben; T2 Kippa-Ring; T4 Shorncliffe; T1 Nambour/Gympie North
- Distance: 6.52 kilometres from Central
- Platforms: 4 (2 islands)

Construction
- Structure type: Ground
- Parking: 123 bays
- Accessible: Yes

Other information
- Status: Staffed
- Station code: 600395 (platform 1); 600396 (platform 2); 600401 (platform 3); 600402 (platform 4)
- Fare zone: Zone 1
- Website: Queensland Rail

History
- Opened: 1882; 144 years ago
- Rebuilt: 1963, 2011
- Former names: Eagle Farm Junction

Services
Preceding station	Queensland Rail	Following station
Wooloowin towards Varsity Lakes via Roma Street	T5 Brisbane Airport line	International Airport towards Domestic Airport
Bowen Hills towards Ipswich or Rosewood via Roma Street	T1 Caboolture line	Northgate towards Caboolture
Wooloowin towards Roma Street	T3 Doomben line	Clayfield towards Doomben
Bowen Hills towards Springfield Central via Roma Street	T2 Kippa-Ring line	Northgate towards Kippa-Ring
Wooloowin towards Cleveland via Roma Street	T4 Shorncliffe line	Toombul towards Shorncliffe
Bowen Hills towards Ipswich or Rosewood via Roma Street	T1 Nambour/Gympie North line	Northgate towards Nambour
Location

Eagle Junction is a railway station operated by Queensland Rail on the Airport, Caboolture/Sunshine Coast, Doomben, Redcliffe Peninsula and Shorncliffe lines. It opened in 1882 and serves the Brisbane suburb of Clayfield. It is a ground level station, featuring two island platform with two faces each.

== History ==
The station opened as Eagle Farm Junction, being renamed Eagle Junction in January 1888. The original name reflects that this station was the junction at which the line to Eagle Farm branched off.

The station was rebuilt in 1963. In 2011, the station was upgraded.

== Services ==
Eagle Junction station is served by Airport, Caboolture, Doomben, Redcliffe Peninsula, Shorncliffe and Sunshine Coast line services.

== Platforms and services ==
Eagle Junction platform arrangement
Platform	Line	Destination	Notes
1	T5 Brisbane Airport	Roma Street (to Varsity Lakes line)	
1	T3 Doomben	Roma Street	
1	T3 Doomben	Roma Street (to Cleveland line)	Evening peak only
1	T4 Shorncliffe	Roma Street (to Cleveland line)	
2	T5 Brisbane Airport	Domestic Airport	
2	T3 Doomben	Doomben	
2	T4 Shorncliffe	Shorncliffe	
3	T1 Caboolture	Roma Street (to Ipswich/Rosewood line)	
3	T2 Kippa-Ring	Roma Street (to Springfield line)	
3	T1 Nambour/Gympie North	Roma Street (to Ipswich/Rosewood line)	
4	T1 Caboolture	Caboolture	
4	T2 Kippa-Ring	Kippa-Ring	
4	T1 Nambour/Gympie North	Nambour	
