= Fortitude Valley railway station =

Railway station in Brisbane, Australia

Fortitude Valley Chinatown 華麗區站 中國城
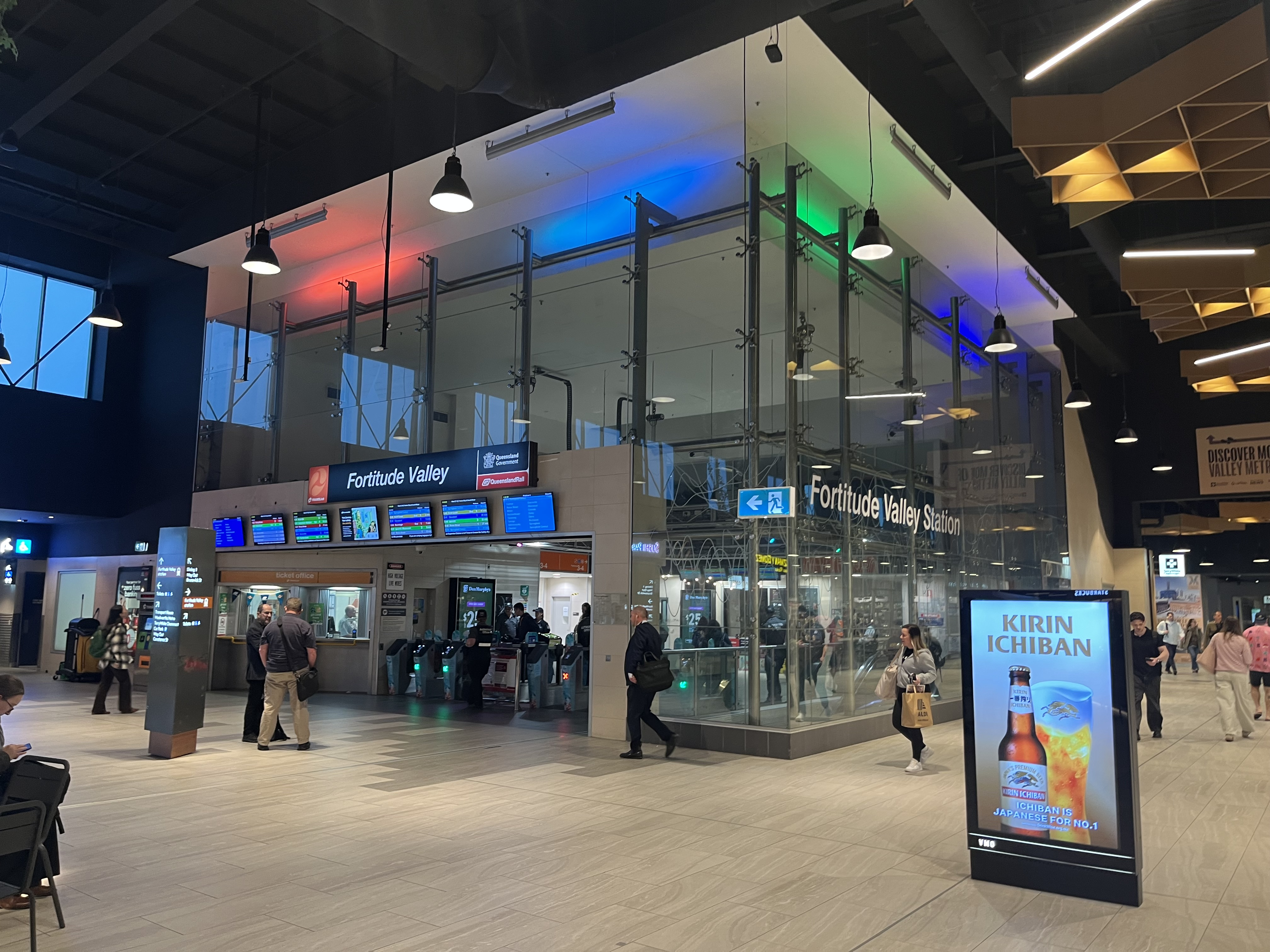
- Station entrance in August 2026

General information
- Location: Brunswick Street, Fortitude Valley
- Coordinates: 27.4560°S 153.0337°E
- Owner: Queensland Rail
- Operator: Queensland Rail
- Lines: T5 Brisbane Airport; T1 Caboolture; T3 Doomben; T6 Ferny Grove; T2 Kippa-Ring; T4 Shorncliffe; T1 Nambour/Gympie North
- Distance: 1.33 kilometres from Central
- Platforms: 4 (2 islands)

Construction
- Structure type: Underground
- Accessible: Yes

Other information
- Status: Staffed
- Station code: 600014 (platform 1); 600013 (platform 2); 600010 (platform 3); 600012 (platform 4)
- Fare zone: go card 1
- Website: Queensland Rail

History
- Opened: 1 November 1890; 136 years ago
- Former names: Brunswick Street

Services
| Preceding station | Queensland Rail | Following station |
|---|---|---|
| Central towards Varsity Lakes | Brisbane Airport line | Bowen Hills towards Domestic Airport |
| Central towards Ipswich or Rosewood | Caboolture line | Bowen Hills towards Caboolture |
| Central towards Roma Street | Doomben line | Bowen Hills towards Doomben |
| Central towards Beenleigh | Ferny Grove line | Bowen Hills towards Ferny Grove |
| Central towards Springfield Central | Kippa-Ring line | Bowen Hills towards Kippa-Ring |
| Central towards Cleveland | Shorncliffe line | Bowen Hills towards Shorncliffe |
| Central towards Ipswich or Rosewood | Nambour/Gympie North line | Bowen Hills towards Nambour or Gympie North |
Location

Fortitude Valley is a railway station located on the North Coast line in Queensland, Australia. Located beneath the Valley Metro complex, it serves the central Brisbane suburb of Fortitude Valley. The station is one of four inner city stations that form a core corridor through the centre of Brisbane.

Pedestrian access to the station is via two thoroughfares near the corner of Brunswick and Wickham Streets and a pedestrian overpass connecting to McWhirters. There is also a lesser known entrance through the car park at the Northern side of the station, both out to Alfred Street in the West and Alden Street in the east, the latter through a secluded lift in the eastern side of the car parking complex.

On the Path to the overpass to McWhirters, exists two escalators that lead down to Wickham Street, however due to political issues these escalators are non-functional and are normally closed off with a metal door.

== History ==
The station opened on 1 November 1890 as Brunswick Street with the completion of the railway from Brisbane Central.

In July 2007, an upgrade on the station commenced but being a busy station, only two platforms were able to be upgraded at any one time.

The upgrade was completed in October 2008 with escalators, lifts, new lighting, updated passenger information displays and upgraded flooring. With the upgrade completed, the station was renamed Fortitude Valley.

An upgrade of the Valley Metro Shopping centre (building that exists around the station) commenced in 2017 and has the potential to upgrade the entrances to the station.

== Services ==
Fortitude Valley station is served by all suburban and interurban City network lines. Also see Inner City timetable

== Platforms and services ==
Fortitude Valley platform arrangement
| Platform | Line | Destination | Notes |
|---|---|---|---|
| 1 | Airport | Roma Street (to Gold Coast line) | |
| 1 | Doomben | Roma Street | |
| 1 | Doomben | Roma Street (to Cleveland line) | Evening peak only |
| 1 | Ferny Grove | Roma Street (to Beenleigh line) | |
| 1 | Shorncliffe | Roma Street (to Cleveland line) | |
| 2 | Airport | Domestic Airport | |
| 2 | Doomben | Doomben | |
| 2 | Ferny Grove | Ferny Grove | |
| 2 | Shorncliffe | Shorncliffe | |
| 3 | Caboolture | Roma Street (to Ipswich/Rosewood line) | |
| 3 | Redcliffe Peninsula | Roma Street (to Springfield line) | |
| 3 | Sunshine Coast | Roma Street (to Ipswich/Rosewood line) | |
| 4 | Caboolture | Caboolture | |
| 4 | Redcliffe Peninsula | Kippa-Ring | |
| 4 | Sunshine Coast | Nambour or Gympie North | |
