= Albion railway station, Brisbane =

Railway station in Queensland, Australia

Albion
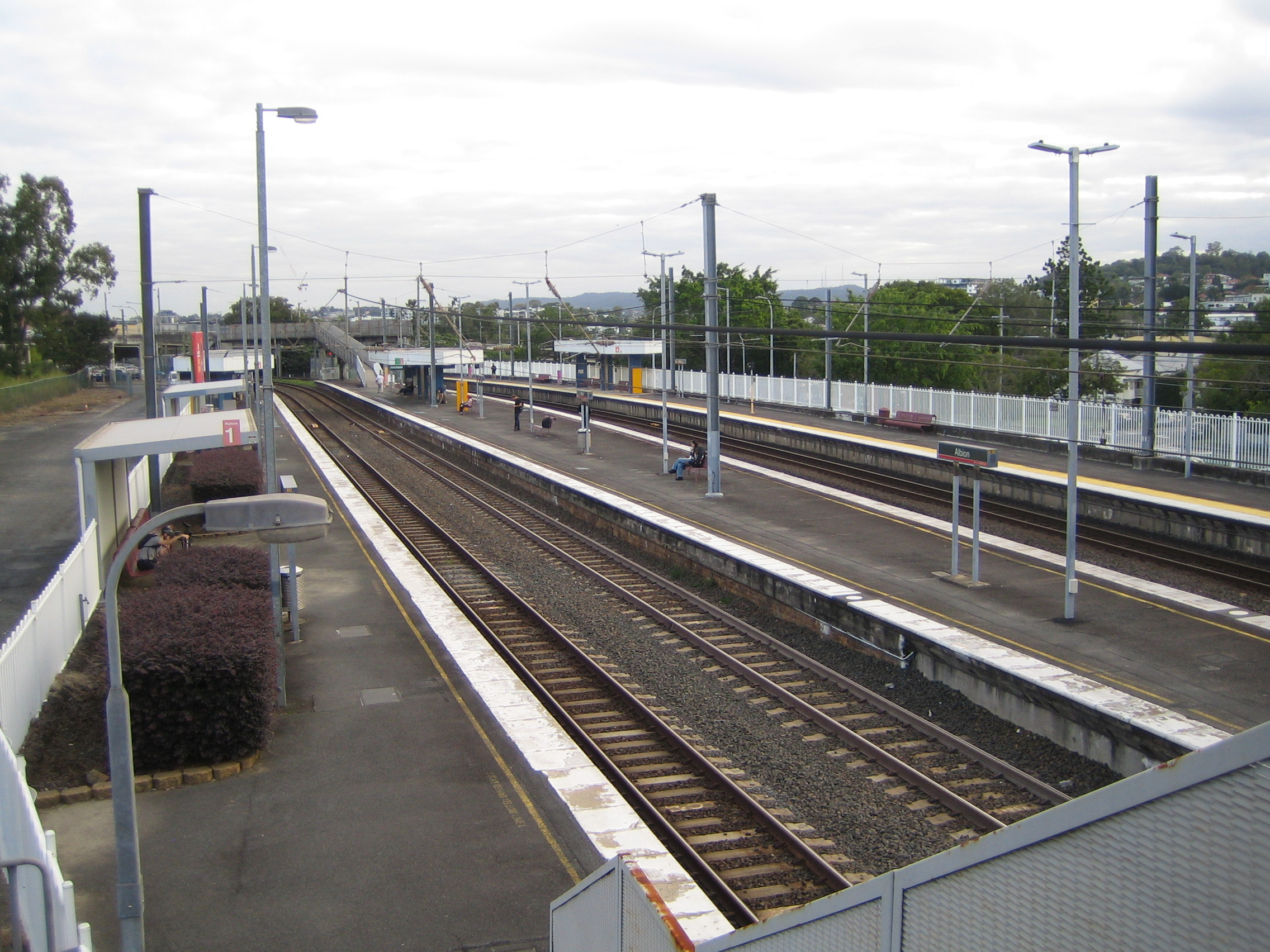
- Southbound view from Platform 1, June 2026

General information
- Location: Albion Road, Albion
- Coordinates: 27°25′45″S 153°02′26″E
- Owner: Queensland Rail
- Operator: Queensland Rail
- Lines: T5 Brisbane Airport; T3 Doomben; T4 Shorncliffe
- Distance: 4.58 kilometres from Central
- Platforms: 4 (2 side, 1 island)

Construction
- Structure type: Ground
- Parking: 441 bays
- Accessible: Yes

Other information
- Status: Staffed
- Station code: 600365 (platform 1); 600366 (platform 2); 600367 (platform 3); 600368 (platform 4)
- Fare zone: Zone 1
- Website: Queensland Rail

History
- Opened: 11 May 1882; 144 years ago

Services
Preceding station	Queensland Rail	Following station
Bowen Hills towards Varsity Lakes via Roma Street	T5 Brisbane Airport line	Wooloowin towards Domestic Airport
Bowen Hills towards Roma Street	T3 Doomben line	Wooloowin towards Doomben
Bowen Hills towards Cleveland via Roma Street	T4 Shorncliffe line	Wooloowin towards Shorncliffe
Location
- Location within Queensland

Albion is a railway station operated by Queensland Rail on the Airport, Doomben and Shorncliffe lines. It opened in 1882 and serves the Brisbane suburb of Albion. It is a ground level station, featuring one island platform with two faces and two side platforms.

== History ==
On 29 November 1999, two extra platforms opened as part of the quadruplication of the line from Bowens Hills to Northgate.

== Platforms and services ==
Albion platform arrangement
Platform	Line	Destination	Notes
1	T5 Brisbane Airport	Roma Street (to Varsity Lakes line)	
1	T3 Doomben	Roma Street	
1	T3 Doomben	Roma Street (to Cleveland line)	Evening peak only
1	T4 Shorncliffe	Roma Street (to Cleveland line)	
2	T5 Brisbane Airport	Domestic Airport	
2	T3 Doomben	Doomben	
2	T4 Shorncliffe	Shorncliffe	
3	No scheduled services		
4	No scheduled services		
