= Cribb Island, Queensland =

Former suburb of Brisbane, Queensland, Australia

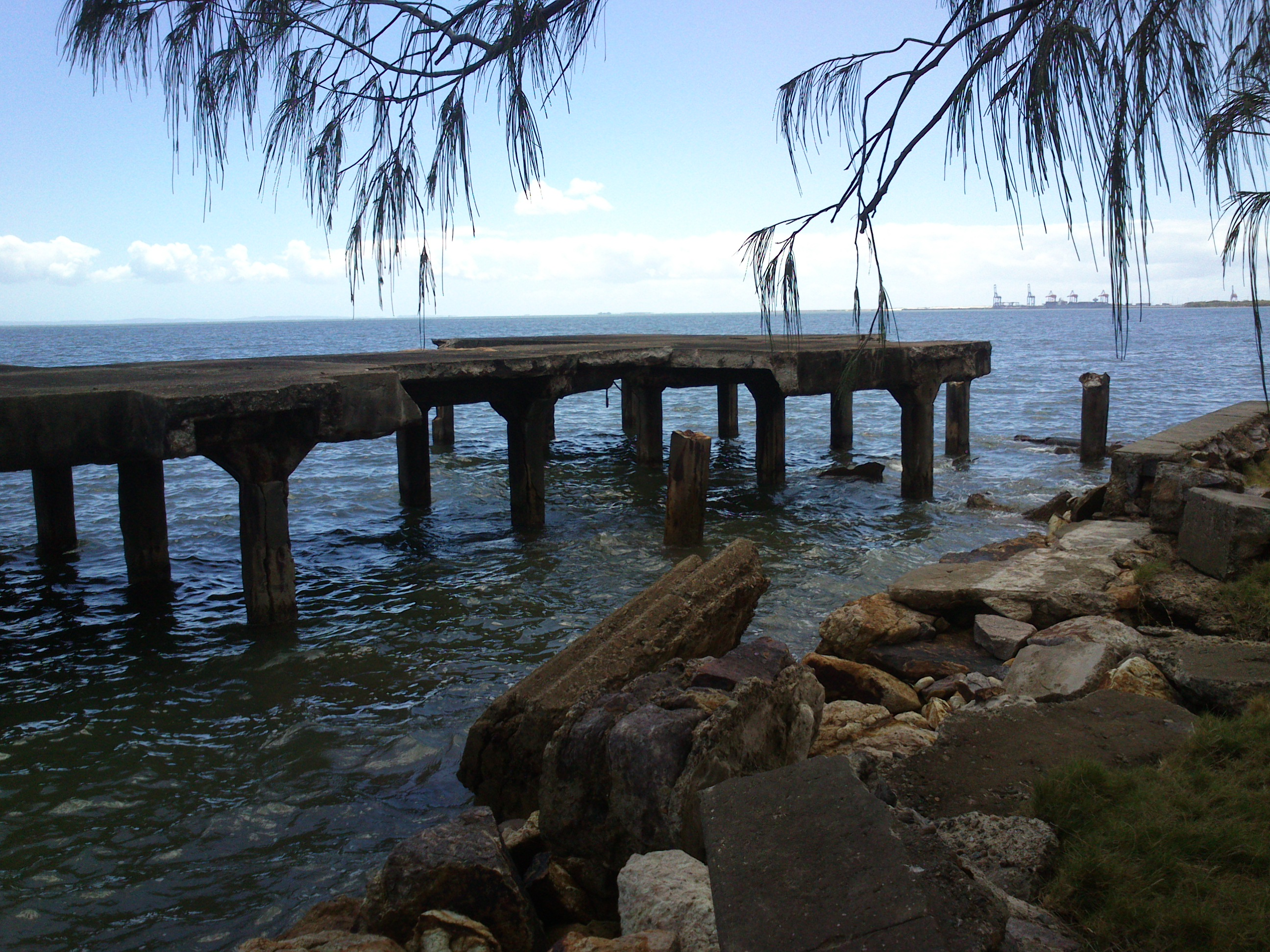
Remnants of Cribb Island foreshore structure, 2014

Cribb Island was a suburb of Brisbane, Queensland, Australia, which is now part of the site of Brisbane Airport and part of the suburb of Brisbane Airport. The suburb was the childhood home of the Gibb brothers, who later became famous as the Bee Gees.

== Geography ==
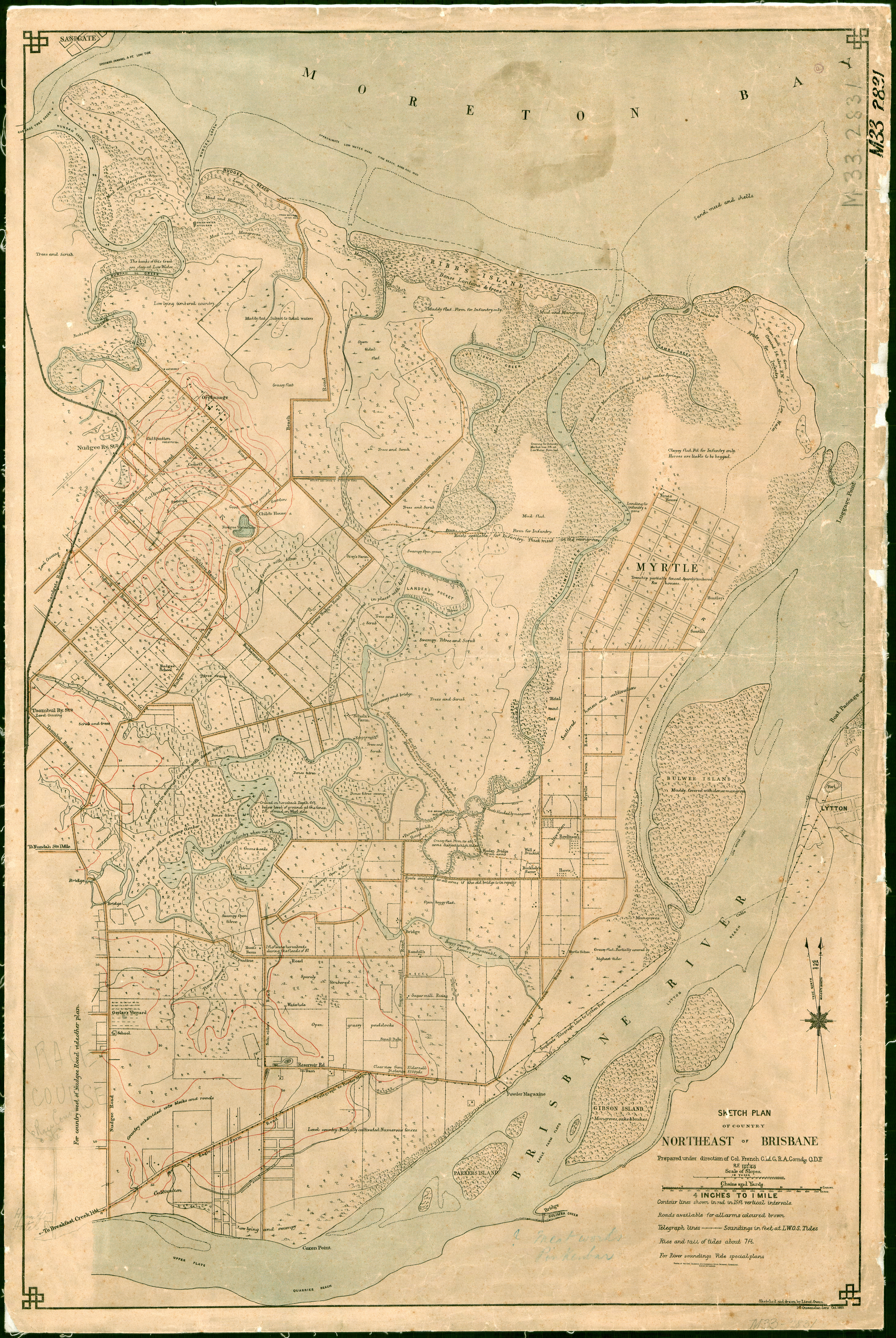
Cribb Island (centre north), 1889

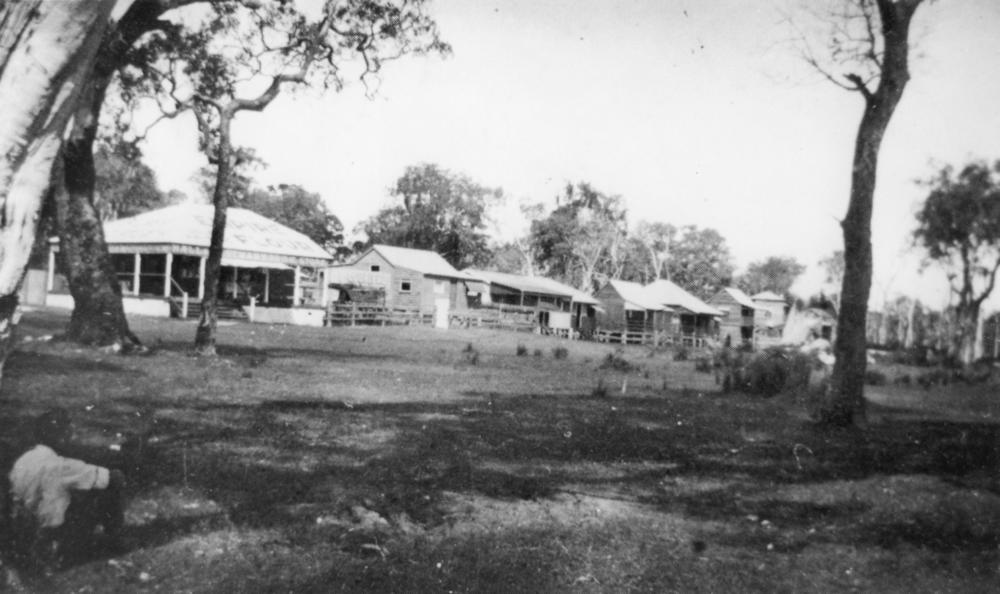
Fishing shacks on the foreshore at Cribb Island, 1926

"Cribbie", as it was known by the locals, consisted of two areas which were made up of Cribb Island which had a beach facing Moreton Bay and was used mostly by holiday makers and Jackson's Estate to the south-west of the beach used for farming and permanent residents. The entire area of Cribb Island, which was about 5 kilometres (3.1 mi) long and 400 metres wide, was built essentially on a mud flat that faced Moreton Bay. It was not a true island, but in an area surrounded by creeks, tidal flats and mud flats. In the 1970s, the land was resumed by the Australian Government to expand the Brisbane Airport's capability for the larger jets ('Heavies') used in international flights. This erased almost all evidence of the natural and man-made features of Cribb Island.

Cribb Island also gave its name to a local species of marine worm, the Cribb Island worm Marphysa mullawa, popular with fishermen as bait.

== History ==
The original area of Cribb Island was populated in 1884 by a tribe of approximately 50 Indigenous Australian people, who bartered their locally-caught fish and mud crabs for bread and potatoes from the early European settlers.

Cribb Island received its name from John George Cribb (1830–1905). He was the son of Robert Cribb, an alderman of the Town of Brisbane and member of the Queensland Legislative Assembly. John George Cribb bought 150 acres (0.61 km^{2}) of land from the Queensland Government in 1863. In 1885, Cribb sold 65 of those acres to James Jackson for the purpose of growing bananas. This area became known as Jackson's Estate. The land that wasn't used by Jackson was leased out to livestock farmers.

There was only one road into Cribb Island via Lower Nudgee (now Nudgee). At first, as this road was floated on top of logs across the mud-flat, it was susceptible to flooding and brief periods of inaccessibility. In 1914 an improved road was built, allowing for access by standard motor vehicles.

Cribb Island State School opened on 18 August 1919 and closed on 14 December 1979. It was located on Cribb Island Road in Jackson's Estate at approximately 27.3583°S 153.1167°E with the camping reserve immediately to its south.

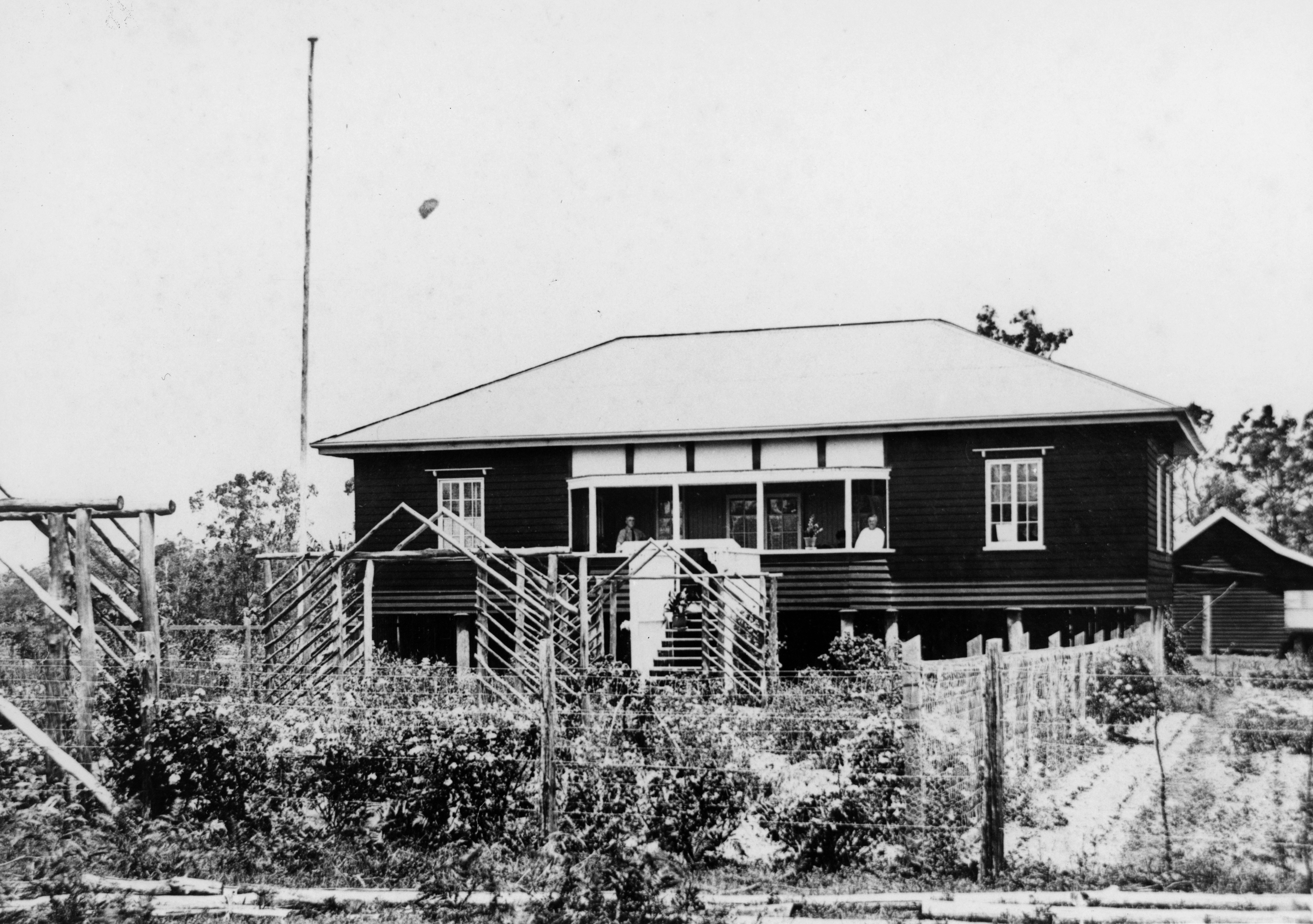
Cribb Island Methodist Church, 1926, with a kitchen garden at the front

Methodist services were initially held in the home of Mrs and Mrs Jackson. A Methodist Sunday School group had formed by 1914. Cribb Island Methodist Church was built in 1918 from timber at a cost of £200. It was on the southern corner of Cribb Island Road and Elmslie Street. In 1927, it was renovated and enlarged. In 1977, it was closed and demolished due to the airport redevelopment.

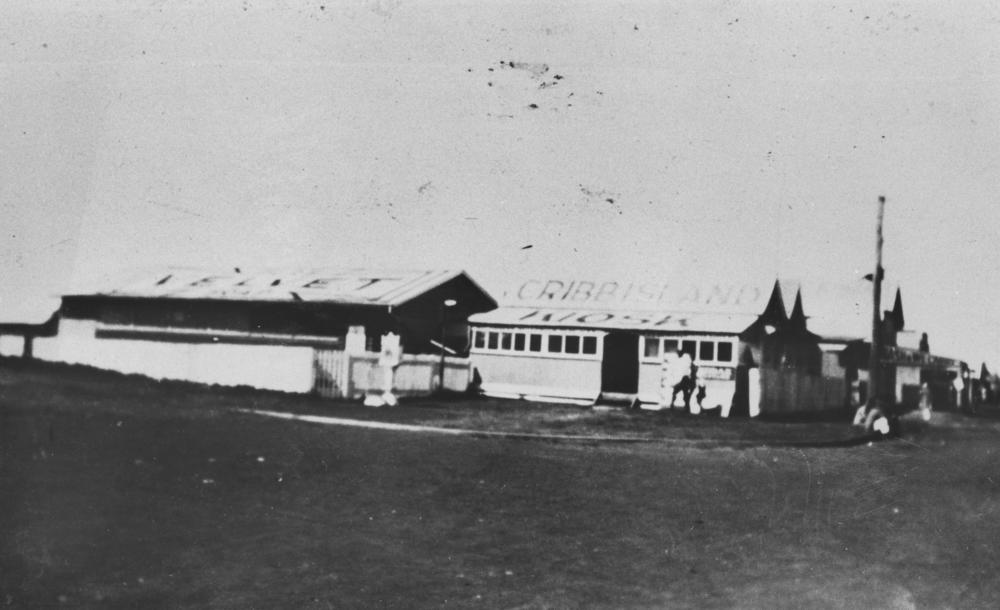
Cribb Island kiosk,1927

Later on through the 1920s, the Cribb Island and Jackson's Estate areas became a tourist destination and seaside resort area due to their close proximity to Brisbane's town centre. Cribb Island Post Office and kiosk opened in November 1920 and closed in 1980.

Bus services commenced to Cribb Island in December 1918, operated by private owners.

In the 1930s, the town had many essential services including a school, general store, cafés etc. The resident population fluctuated around 400.

The 1930s however saw a change in the area's fortunes as it was at the mercy of a severe economic downturn. House owners were forced to sell their houses in the Cribb Island area to make ends meet, typically for next to nothing. The poor bought these homes and the area became a haven for those struggling to get by. Although more local business moved in to provide basic services, this demographic remained the status quo until the end of the suburb's existence.

In February 1936, E.J. Taylor's tender for £559 to erect a Catholic church to seat 150 people was accepted. On Sunday 6 June 1936, Archbishop James Duhig officially opened St Martha's Catholic church. It was on the north side of Elmslie Street between Cribb Island Road and Moreton Street. It was designed by architect F. Cullen. It was demolished in 1988 when the new airport was built.

On Sunday 10 February 1952, Duhig officially opened St Martha's Catholic School as an extension of the church building. The school closed in 1968.

In the early 1960s, Cribb Island was the childhood home of Bee Gees pop stars Barry, Robin and Maurice Gibb. They lived at 30 Elmslie Street. They enrolled at Cribb Island State School in January 1960 with Barry leaving in September 1960 and Robin and Maurice leaving in April 1961.

In 1970, the Commonwealth Government proceeded to resume land on the island for the purpose of upgrading the airport. The population at that time was about 900 people. Over the next decade, people slowly moved out of the area as the Government took control of the land. The last resident unwillingly left her home in 1980.

On 22 September 1986, the Queensland Government decided to remove the names Cribb Island and Lower Nudgee from the official maps because "no trace of either suburb remains".

Today little remains of Cribb Island as the land was reclaimed and extensively redeveloped as part of Brisbane Airport, with the new runway which now appears over the former suburb being officially completed in 2020.

== Legacy ==
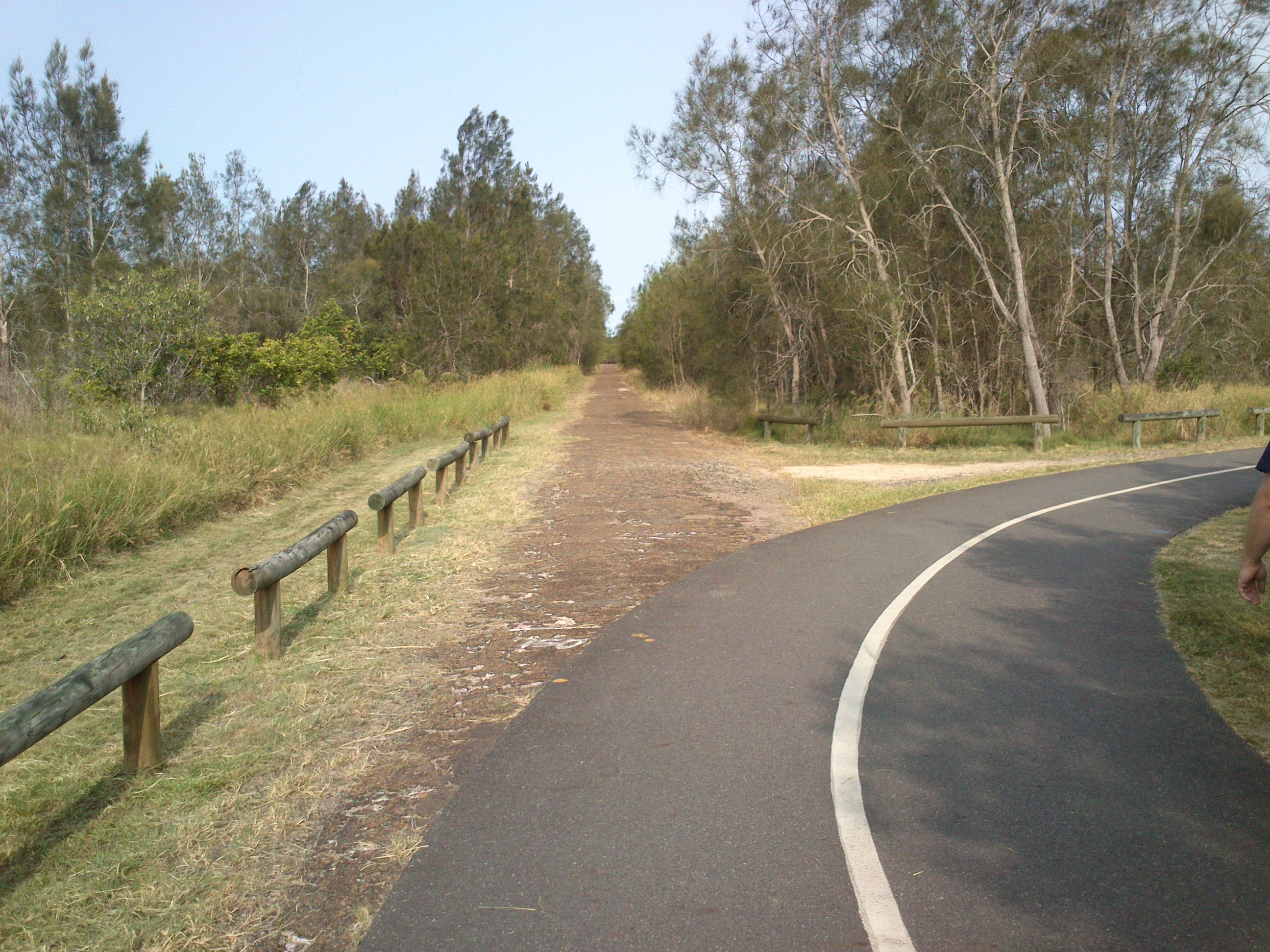
Remnants of Cribb Island Road on Jim Soorley Bikeway, 2014

Many former residents are keeping memories of Cribb Island alive on various websites and writer Tracy Wills has written a book, On the Flats: The Road to Cribb Island, about childhood experiences growing up on Cribb Island.

The Ibis Hotel at Brisbane Airport calls its bistro the Cribb Island Beach Club.

In 2024, Brisbane YouTuber IBIS Channel 32 produced a mini-documentary about the history of Cribb Island.
