= Brisbane Airport (suburb) =

- Suburb
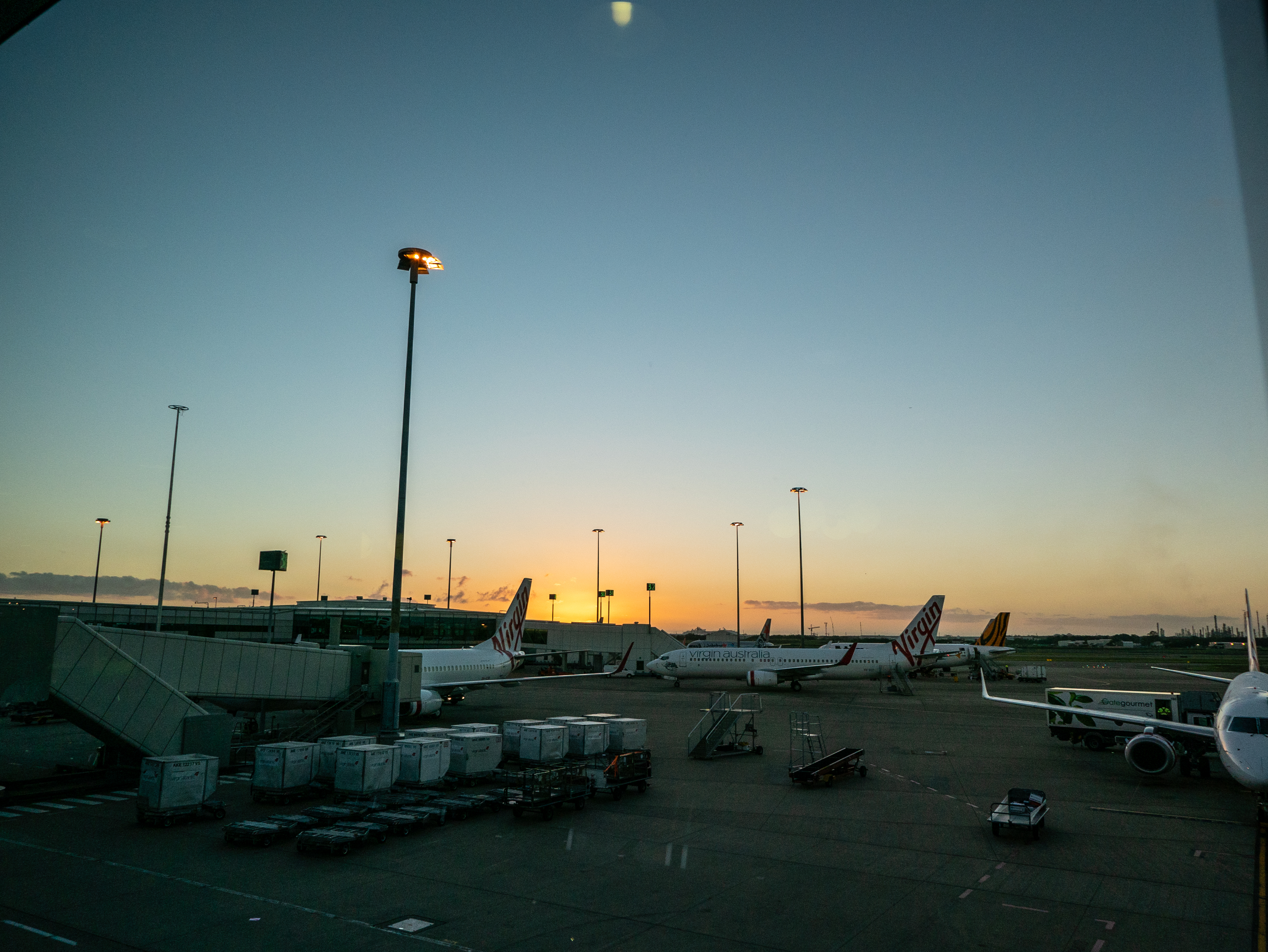

- Interactive map of Brisbane Airport
- Coordinates: 27.3933°S 153.1133°E
- Country: Australia
- State: Queensland
- City: Brisbane
- LGA: City of Brisbane (Hamilton Ward)
- Location: 14.3 km (8.9 mi) NE of Brisbane CBD

Government
  - State electorate: Clayfield
  - Federal division: Lilley

Area
  - Total: 33.4 km^{2} (12.9 sq mi)

Population
  - Total: 22 (2021 census)
  - Density: 0.659/km^{2} (1.71/sq mi)
- Time zone: UTC+10:00 (AEST)
- Postcode: 4008
Suburbs around Brisbane Airport
Nudgee; Banyo	Nudgee Beach	Port of Brisbane
Northgate; Nundah	Brisbane Airport	Pinkenba
Hendra; Hamilton	Eagle Farm	Pinkenba

Brisbane Airport is a coastal suburb in the City of Brisbane, Queensland, Australia. In the 2021 census, Brisbane Airport had a population of 22 people.

Brisbane Airport is located approximately 14 kilometres (9 mi) north-east from the Brisbane central business district. The majority of the land is occupied by the Brisbane Airport. Airport Drive and Moreton Drive link the airport with the Gateway Motorway.

== History ==
Brisbane Airport is situated in the Yugarabul traditional Aboriginal country.

The land occupied by the Brisbane airport was originally part of the suburbs of Eagle Farm and Pinkenba. In 2011, Rachel Nolan, the former Queensland minister for Finance, Natural Resources, and the Arts, published an official notice amending the boundaries of Eagle Farm, Pinkenba, and Hamilton, and established the new suburb of Brisbane Airport.

== Demographics ==
In the 2016 census, Brisbane Airport had a population of 0 people.

In the 2021 census, Brisbane Airport had a population of 22 people.

== Facilities ==
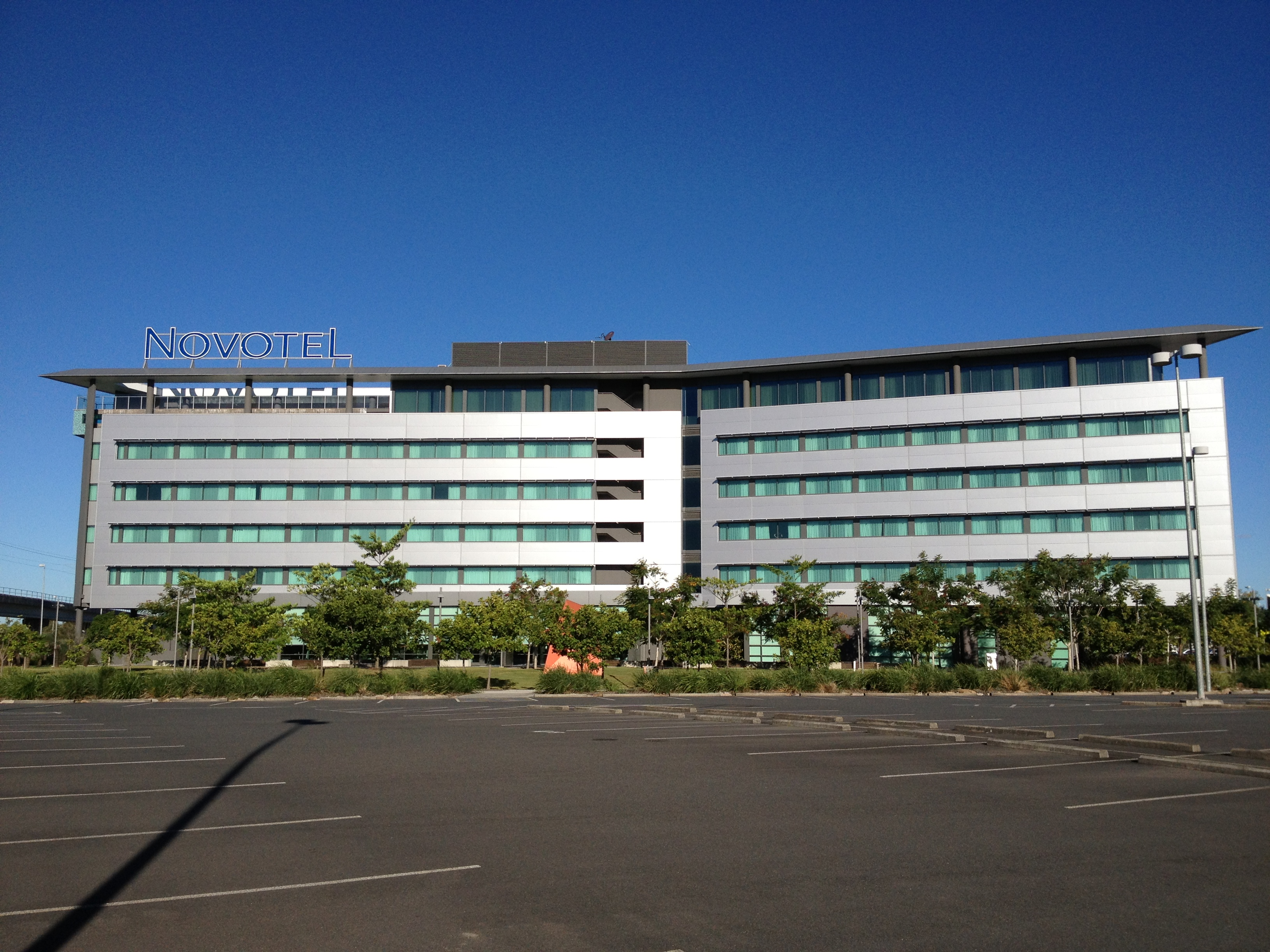
Novotel Hotel

The Skygate Airport Village consists of an 80-hectare (200-acre) precinct that is designated for retail and commercial usage including: a GP Clinic available to the public, the warehouse retail factory outlet DFO and Novotel airport hotel.

== Proposals ==
The Airport Industrial Park is a proposed precinct which includes 100 hectares (250 acres) of land designated for light and general industry. Development had commenced in 2019. The Airport Industrial Park is located next to the Export Park precinct.

To cater for growth and demand at Brisbane Airport, a new Terminal 3 has been proposed. The proposal in planning stages, would provide a new terminal that services both domestic and international flights.

The Skygate Village railway station is a proposed station on the Airport line. The railway station has been proposed to service the Skygate Village business, retail, services and accommodation precinct at Brisbane Airport.

== Transport ==
The Domestic Airport railway station and International Airport railway station provide access to commuter railway services. The Airport line services are operated by Airtrain Citylink, though are integrated with the Queensland Rail commuter rail network. Government-subsidised Translink fares are exempted for Airtrain services. There is also an inter-terminal bus connecting the two terminals, and the Skygate Shopping Precinct including DFO and Novotel hotel.

== Education ==
There are no schools in Brisbane Airport. The nearest government primary schools are Hendra State School in neighbouring Hendra to the south-west and Hamilton State School in neighbouring Hamilton, also to the south-west. The nearest government secondary school is Aviation High, also in Hendra, which offers a number of aviation-specific subjects in addition to the mainstream secondary school subjects which use aviation as examples in teaching and learning.
