= Bowen Hills railway station =

Railway station in Brisbane, Queensland, Australia

Bowen Hills
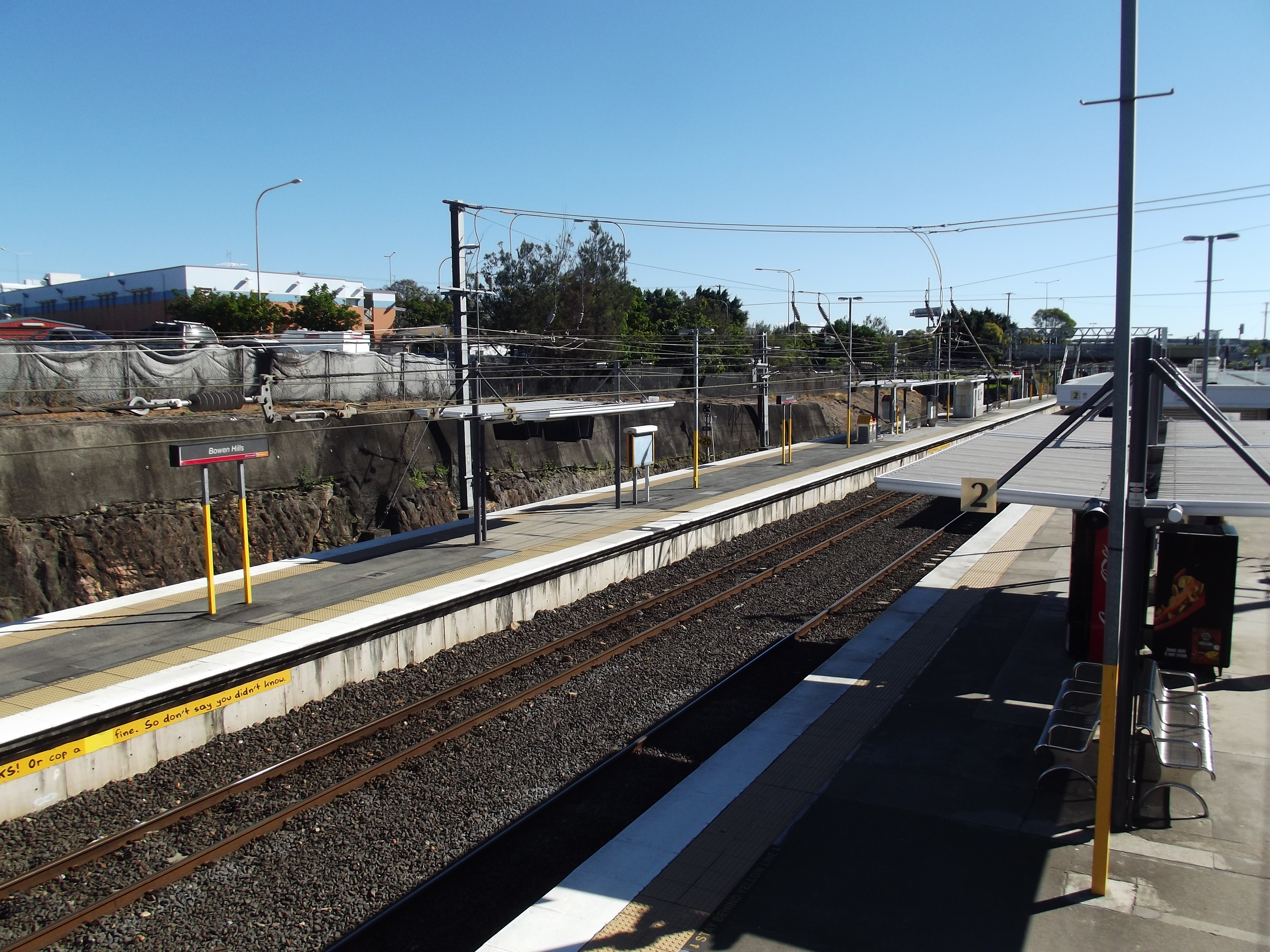
- Northbound view from Platform 2 in July 2012

General information
- Location: Abbotsford Road, Bowen Hills
- Coordinates: 27.4454°S 153.0376°E
- Owner: Queensland Rail
- Operator: Queensland Rail
- Lines: T5 Brisbane Airport; T1 Caboolture; T3 Doomben; T6 Ferny Grove; T2 Kippa-Ring; T4 Shorncliffe; T1 Nambour/Gympie North
- Distance: 2.66 kilometres from Central
- Platforms: 4 (2 islands)

Construction
- Structure type: Ground
- Accessible: Yes

Other information
- Status: Staffed
- Station code: 600005 (platform 1); 600000 (platform 2); 600002 (platform 3); 600007 (platform 4)
- Fare zone: go card 1
- Website: Queensland Rail

History
- Opened: 1973; 53 years ago

Passengers
- 2022-23: 560,687 (annual)
- Rank: 7

Services
Preceding station	Queensland Rail	Following station
Fortitude Valley towards Varsity Lakes	Brisbane Airport line	Albion towards Domestic Airport
Fortitude Valley towards Ipswich or Rosewood	Caboolture line	Eagle Junction towards Caboolture
Fortitude Valley towards Roma Street	Doomben line	Albion towards Doomben
Fortitude Valley towards Beenleigh	Ferny Grove line	Windsor towards Ferny Grove
Fortitude Valley towards Springfield Central	Kippa-Ring line	Eagle Junction towards Kippa-Ring
Fortitude Valley towards Cleveland	Shorncliffe line	Albion towards Shorncliffe
Fortitude Valley towards Ipswich or Rosewood	Nambour/Gympie North line	Eagle Junction towards Nambour
Fortitude Valley towards Ipswich or Rosewood	Nambour/Gympie North line	Northgate towards Gympie North
Location

Bowen Hills is a railway station located on the North Coast line in Queensland, Australia. It serves the Brisbane suburb of Bowen Hills. North of the station, the Ferny Grove line branches off. The station is one of four inner city stations that form a core corridor through the centre of Brisbane.

== History ==
There have been three railways stations named Bowen Hills. The first from 1882 to 1889 was near Campbell Street. In 1890, a new station opened at the south end of the Abbotsford Road tunnel. In 1971, to allow for the Mayne marshalling yards to be expanded, Bowen Hill and Mayne Junction stations were closed with a new Bowen Hills station opening in 1973.

As part of the quadruplication of the line from Roma Street station, Platforms 3 and 4 opened on 11 June 1996.

=== Accidents ===
In October 1904, Archibald Kerr, a 16-year-old boy, fell from a moving train near Bowen Hills station; the boy died from the injury to the back of his head caused by the fall. At the time, the train driver was not aware of the event until he was told about it by the signalman on the train's return journey at Brunswick Street station. The train gate was blamed as the cause of the accident at first, but after the gate was found to be in working order, the cause of the accident was not known.

== Services ==
Bowen Hills station is served by Airport, Beenleigh, Caboolture, Doomben, Ferny Grove, Redcliffe Peninsula, Shorncliffe, Springfield and Sunshine Coast line services. Also see Inner City timetable It is adjacent to the Mayne Stabling Yards, with many services terminating here.

== Platforms and services ==
Bowen Hills platform arrangement
Platform	Line	Destination	Notes
1	Airport	Roma Street (to Gold Coast line)	
1	Doomben	Roma Street	
1	Doomben	Roma Street (to Cleveland line)	Evening peak only
1	Ferny Grove	Roma Street (to Beenleigh line)	
1	Shorncliffe	Roma Street (to Cleveland line)	
2	Airport	Domestic Airport	
2	Doomben	Doomben	
2	Ferny Grove	Ferny Grove	
2	Shorncliffe	Shorncliffe	
3	Caboolture	Roma Street (to Ipswich/Rosewood line)	
3	Redcliffe Peninsula	Roma Street (to Springfield line)	
3	Sunshine Coast	Roma Street (to Ipswich/Rosewood line)	
4	Caboolture	Caboolture	
4	Redcliffe Peninsula	Kippa-Ring	
4	Sunshine Coast	Nambour or Gympie North	
