= International Airport railway station, Brisbane =

Railway station in Brisbane, Queensland, Australia

International Airport 国际机场站
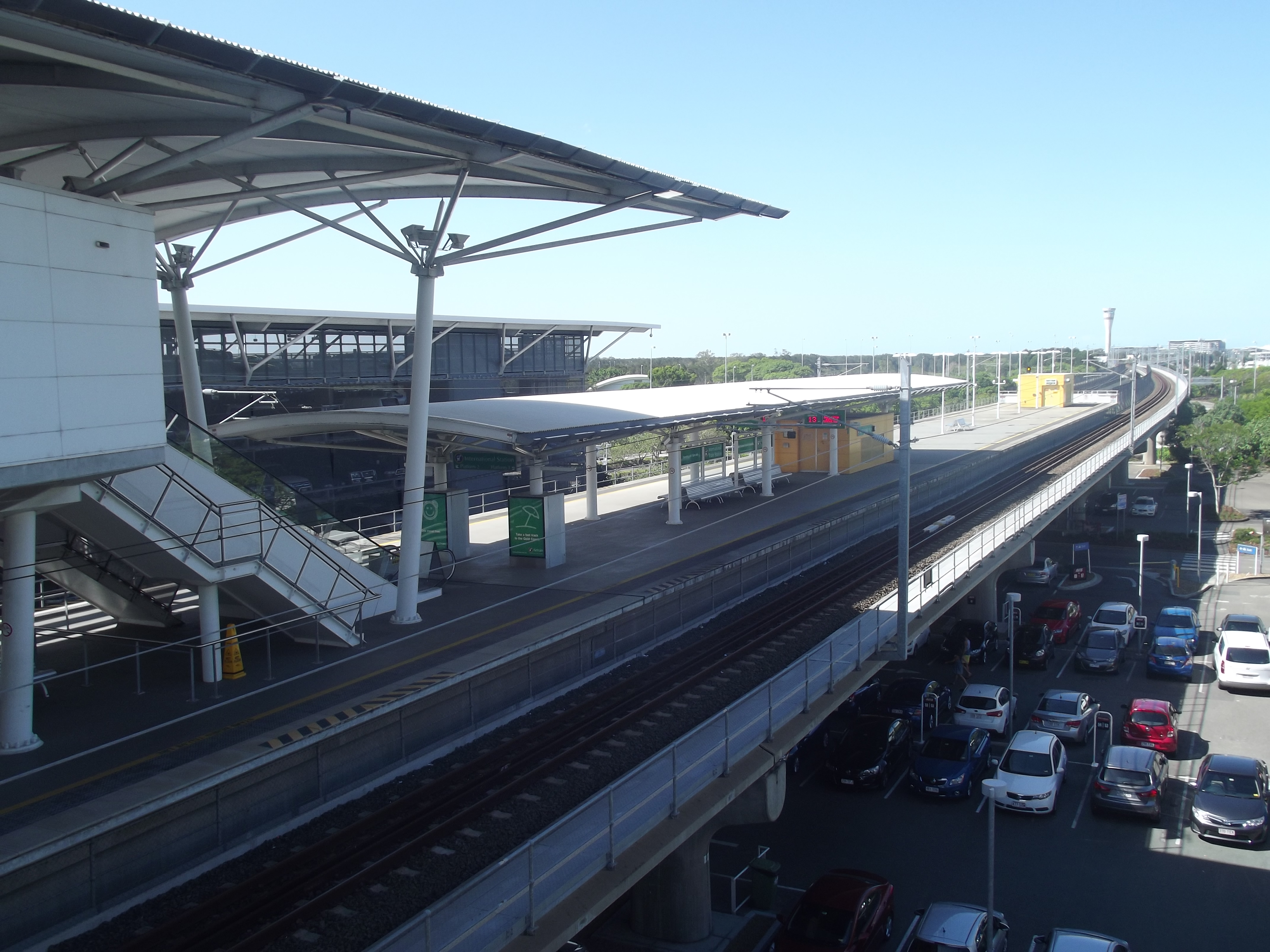
- Northbound view of the station platforms, 2013

General information
- Location: Airport Drive, Brisbane Airport
- Coordinates: 27°24′10″S 153°06′32″E
- Owner: Airtrain Citylink
- Operator: Airtrain Citylink
- Line: T5 Brisbane Airport
- Distance: 14.44 kilometres from Central
- Platforms: 2 (1 island)
- Tracks: 2

Construction
- Structure type: Elevated
- Accessible: Yes

Other information
- Status: Staffed
- Station code: 600426 (platform 1); 600427 (platform 2)
- Fare zone: n/a

History
- Opened: 5 May 2001; 25 years ago

Services
Preceding station	Queensland Rail	Following station
Eagle Junction towards Varsity Lakes	Brisbane Airport line	Domestic Airport Terminus
Location

International Airport railway station is located on the Airport line in Queensland, Australia. It serves the International Terminal at Brisbane Airport, opening on 5 May 2001 at the same time as the line.

== History ==
The station along with the line is owned and operated by Airtrain Citylink under a BOOT scheme. It will pass to Queensland Rail ownership in 2036.

Services are operated by Queensland Rail's City network. Although TransLink's go card is able to be used, the station is not included in the TransLink fare structure, with Airtrain able to charge a premium fare.

The railway station is directly connected to Level 3 of the Brisbane Airport's international terminal by a covered elevated footbridge.

Signage at the station is written in both English and Chinese.

== Services ==
International Terminal is served by City network Airport line services to Roma Street, Boggo Road (formerly Park Road), Varsity Lakes and Domestic Terminal.

== Platforms and services ==
Domestic Airport platform arrangement
Platform	Line	Destination	Notes
1	T5 Brisbane Airport	Roma Street (to Varsity Lakes line)	
2	T5 Brisbane Airport	Domestic Airport	
