= Brisbane Airport line =

Passenger rail service in Queensland, Australia

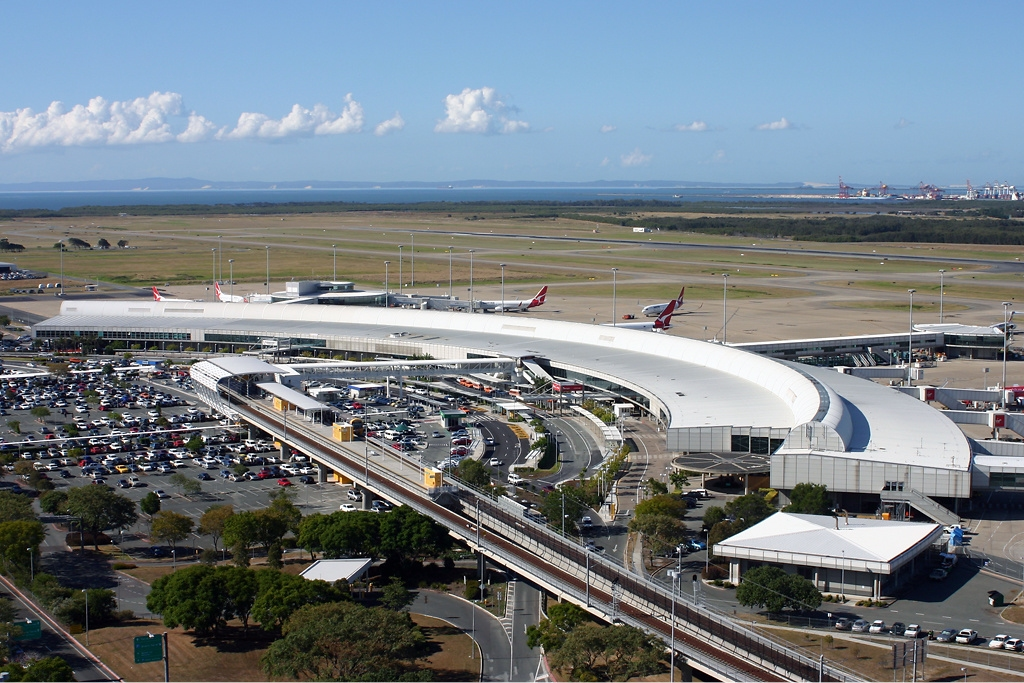
- Domestic Airport station in May 2006

Overview
- Owner: Airtrain Citylink
- Website: airtrain.com.au

Service
- Operator: Queensland Rail
- Rolling stock: NGR

History
- Opened: 5 May 2001

Technical
- Track length: 15.9 km (9.9 mi)
- Track gauge: 1,067 mm (3 ft 6 in)
- Electrification: 2001

The T5 Brisbane Airport line (or Airtrain) is a privately-owned commuter railway line in Brisbane, Queensland. Owned by Airtrain Citylink and operated by Queensland Rail, the line runs for 16.7 kilometres (10 miles) from Domestic Airport to Roma Street, where services continue on the Varsity Lakes line.

== History ==
The Brisbane Airport line is owned and operated by Airtrain Citylink Limited, with financial backing from Transfield Services, Macquarie Bank, Colonial First State and ABN AMRO. The first service ran on 5 May 2001. Airtrain Citylink has a licence from Queensland Transport under a BOOT scheme – build, own, operate and transfer – to build the rail line, to own and operate it, and hand entire infrastructure over to the Queensland Government after 35 years when the company will then cease to exist.

Initial passenger numbers on the service were well below expectations and the company nearly faced voluntary administration in 2003. However, in May 2005, Airtrain operated at a profit for the first time due to significant passenger growth – 1.12 million passengers in the 2004–2005 financial year, an increase of 40% – and a complex company restructure that cut costs by nearly half.

Passenger numbers on the service have also steadily increased, now close to two million passengers each year. In 2008, 6% of visitors to the airport used an Airtrain service. This figure rose to 8% in 2011.

The line connects seamlessly with the Queensland Rail City network and services use City network rolling stock in a commercial agreement with QR. While City network rolling stock is used, Airtrain does not form part of the Translink integrated public transport scheme, and therefore fares are not subsidised by the government. As a result, travel between the airport and City network stations in the Brisbane central business district costs $19.80 one way and $37.60 return (as of December 2022; cheaper on-line). Travel on Airtrain services between ordinary City network stations, not involving airport travel, is charged at the normal Translink rate, including concession (pensioner) rates.

In 2008, Brisbane's Airtrain ran an operating profit of $4.8 million, allowing Airtrain to pay dividends of $1.95 to its shareholders. Airtain is not subsidised by the Queensland Government, and its $220 million construction cost was entirely privately financed. This makes it one of a few known profitable public transport systems.

In late 2012, UK pension fund Universities Superannuation Scheme bought Airtrain for A$110 million.

In 2024, the Queensland Government announced half-price tickets to Brisbane Airport for a 6-month period after negotiating a temporary subsidy deal with Airtrain.

Brisbane Airtrain has been criticised in the media for its perceived high fares, monopoly and exclusivity rights over public transport access to Brisbane Airport, services not operating late enough into the evening, and operating significantly fewer services (632 per week) when compared against Perth's Airport train line (1019 per week).

In 2026, Brisbane Airtrain commenced legal action against the Queensland Government in the Supreme Court of Queensland seeking revenue adjustments of around $4.75 million. The revenue adjustments were sought due to the impact of the Queensland Government's 50c flat fares policy, which reduced revenue from train passengers on connecting through-journeys into Brisbane Airport.

On 10 August 2026, the Airport line was numbered T5 (along with the Varsity Lakes line) and renamed the Brisbane Airport line.

== Proposed extensions ==
Brisbane Airport Corporation has proposed a new station at its Skygate retail park at the south-western edge of the airport. Discussions have taken place with Airtrain Holdings Limited and the Queensland Government.

== Network and operations ==
=== Services ===
Commencing at the Domestic Terminal, all services stop at the International Terminal and then all stations though the Brisbane CBD to at least Roma Street. The typical travel time between Domestic Terminal and Brisbane City is approximately 22 minutes (to Central). This travel time results in an average train speed of 43 km/h (27 mph).

Services run every fifteen minutes during the morning and afternoon weekday peak hours, and every half hour during the off-peak. Most services continue as Gold Coast line services.

Passengers for/from the Doomben, Caboolture, Shorncliffe and Redcliffe Peninsula lines change at Eagle Junction, Ferny Grove and Nambour and Gympie North lines at Bowen Hills, and all other lines at Central.

=== Stations ===
List of T5 Brisbane Airport line stations
T5 Brisbane Airport line
Station	Image	Suburb	Opened	Terrain	Connections	Time (Note: Travel time in minutes from Roma Street.)
	Continues from T5 Varsity Lakes line					
Roma Street		Brisbane CBD	14 June 1875	Ground	Ipswich/Rosewood line Springfield line Doomben Cleveland line Beenleigh line Brisbane Metro Bus transport in Queensland	0
Central		Brisbane CBD	18 August 1889	Built over	Sunshine Coast line, Queensland Redcliffe Peninsula line Doomben Shorncliffe line Ferny Grove line	2 (Note: Service dwells for 2 minutes.)
Fortitude Valley		Fortitude Valley	1 November 1890	Underground	Sunshine Coast line, Queensland Redcliffe Peninsula line Doomben Shorncliffe line Ferny Grove line	6
Bowen Hills		Bowen Hills	1973	Ground	Sunshine Coast line, Queensland Redcliffe Peninsula line Doomben Shorncliffe line Ferny Grove line	9
Albion		Albion	1882	Ground	Doomben Shorncliffe line	13
Wooloowin		Wooloowin	1882	Ground	Doomben Shorncliffe line	15
Eagle Junction		Clayfield	1882	Ground	Sunshine Coast line, Queensland Doomben Shorncliffe line	17
International Airport		Brisbane Airport	5 May 2001	Elevated	none	25
Domestic Airport		Brisbane Airport	5 May 2001	Elevated	none	28
