= Airtrain Citylink =

Australian transport company

- Industry: Railway infrastructure owner
- Founded: 1996
- Headquarters: Brisbane
- Owner: Universities Superannuation Scheme
- Website: www.airtrain.com.au

Airtrain Citylink is a company that was formed to build and operate the Airport line in Brisbane, Queensland, Australia under a BOOT scheme. The line will pass into Queensland Rail ownership in 2036.

== History ==
In 1995, the Queensland Government called for expressions of interest to build the Airport railway line to Brisbane Airport. In May 1996, Airtrain Citylink was named as the preferred proponent, however it would not be until 1999, that an agreement between the government and consortium to build the line was signed.

Airtrain Citylink's shareholders included Macquarie Bank (30%), Colonial First State (20%), Hyder Consulting (15%), GIO General (11%) Transfield Services (10%) and Transroute International (10%). Tracklaying started in August 2000, with the line opening on 5 May 2001. Under the contract, Airtrain Citylink financed and built the line as a BOOT scheme. In 2036, ownership of the line will pass to Queensland Rail. Services are operated under contract by Queensland Rail.

In 2013, Airtrain Citylink was purchased by Universities Superannuation Scheme.
