= Domestic Airport railway station, Brisbane =

Railway station in Brisbane, Queensland, Australia

Domestic Airport 国内机场站
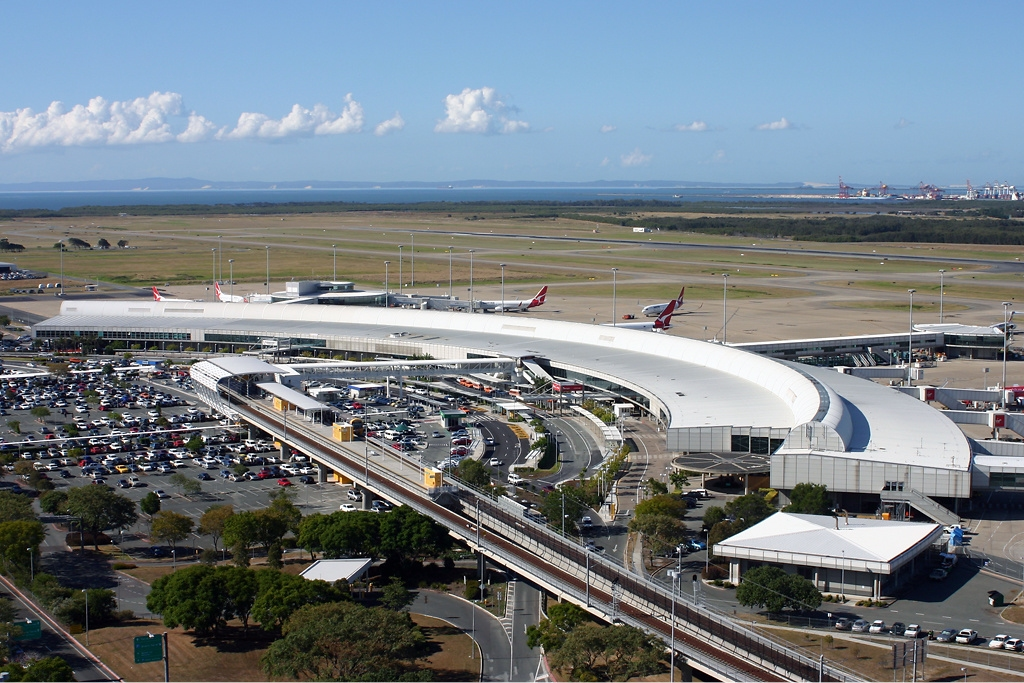
- View of the station and airport in May 2006

General information
- Location: Alpinia Drive, Brisbane Airport
- Coordinates: 27°23′07″S 153°07′07″E
- Owner: Airtrain Citylink
- Operator: Airtrain Citylink
- Line: T5 Brisbane Airport
- Distance: 15.91 kilometres from Central
- Platforms: 2 (1 island)
- Tracks: 2

Construction
- Structure type: Elevated

Other information
- Status: Staffed
- Station code: 600428 (platform 1); 600429 (platform 2)
- Fare zone: n/a

History
- Opened: 5 May 2001; 25 years ago

Services
Preceding station	Queensland Rail	Following station
International Airport towards Varsity Lakes	Brisbane Airport line	Terminus
Location

Domestic Airport railway station is the terminus station of the Airport line in Queensland, Australia. It serves the Domestic Terminal at Brisbane Airport, opening on 5 May 2001 at the same time as the line.

== History ==
The station along with the line is owned and operated by Airtrain Citylink under a BOOT scheme. It will pass to Queensland Rail ownership in 2036.

Services are operated by Queensland Rail's City network. Although Translink's go card is able to be used, the station is not included in the TransLink fare structure, with Airtrain able to charge a premium fare.

The station is connected to the Brisbane Airport's domestic terminal by a covered elevated footbridge, with a lift and escalators to the kerbside immediately in front of the entrance to the terminal.

Signage at the station is written in both English and Chinese.

== Platforms and services ==
Domestic Airport is served by City network Airport line services to Roma Street, Boggo Road (formerly Park Road) and Varsity Lakes.

Domestic Airport platform arrangement
Platform	Line	Destination	Notes
1	T5 Brisbane Airport	Roma Street (to Varsity Lakes line)	
2	T5 Brisbane Airport	Roma Street (to Varsity Lakes line)	
