= Transport on the Gold Coast, Queensland =

Transport on the Gold Coast
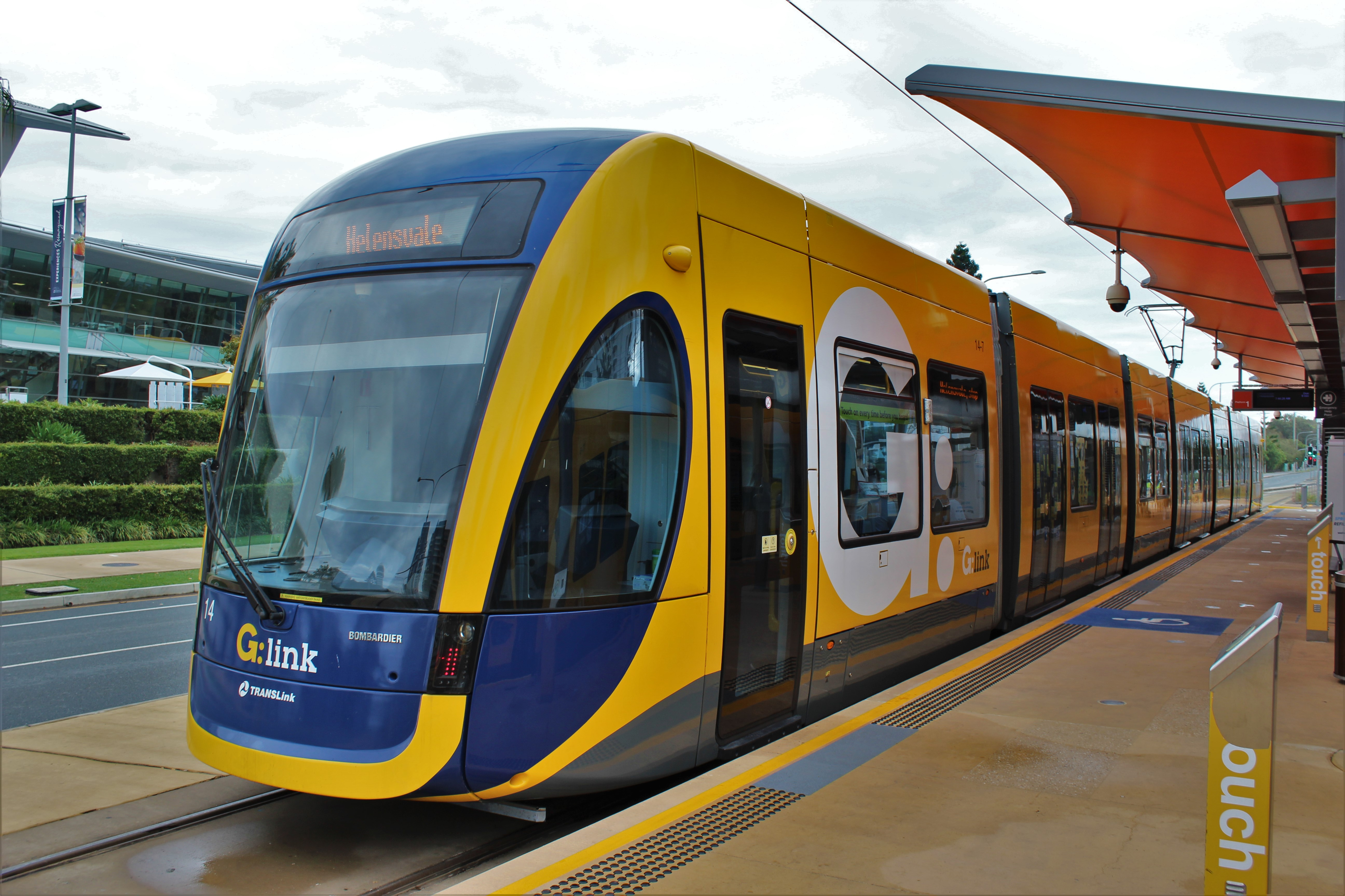
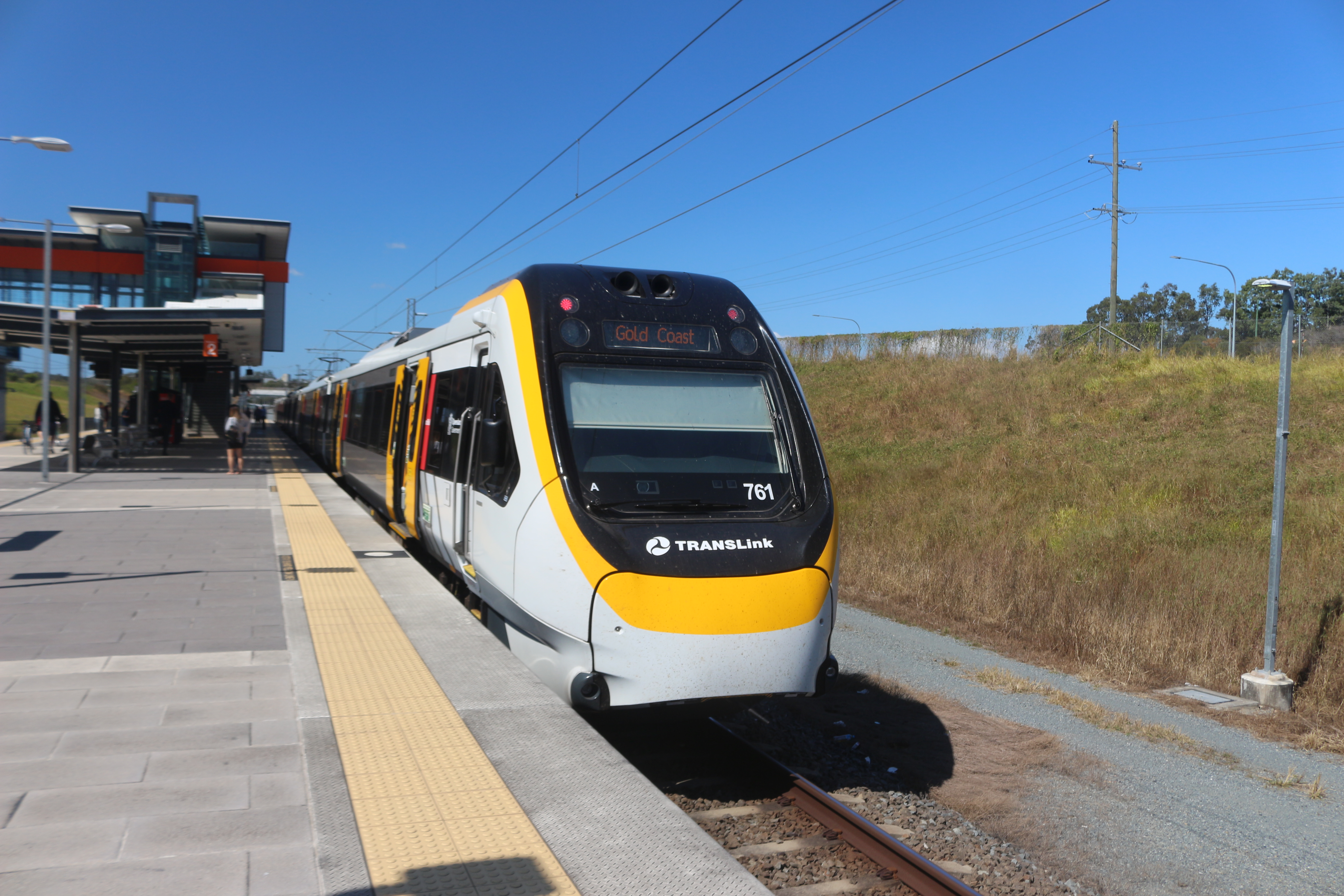
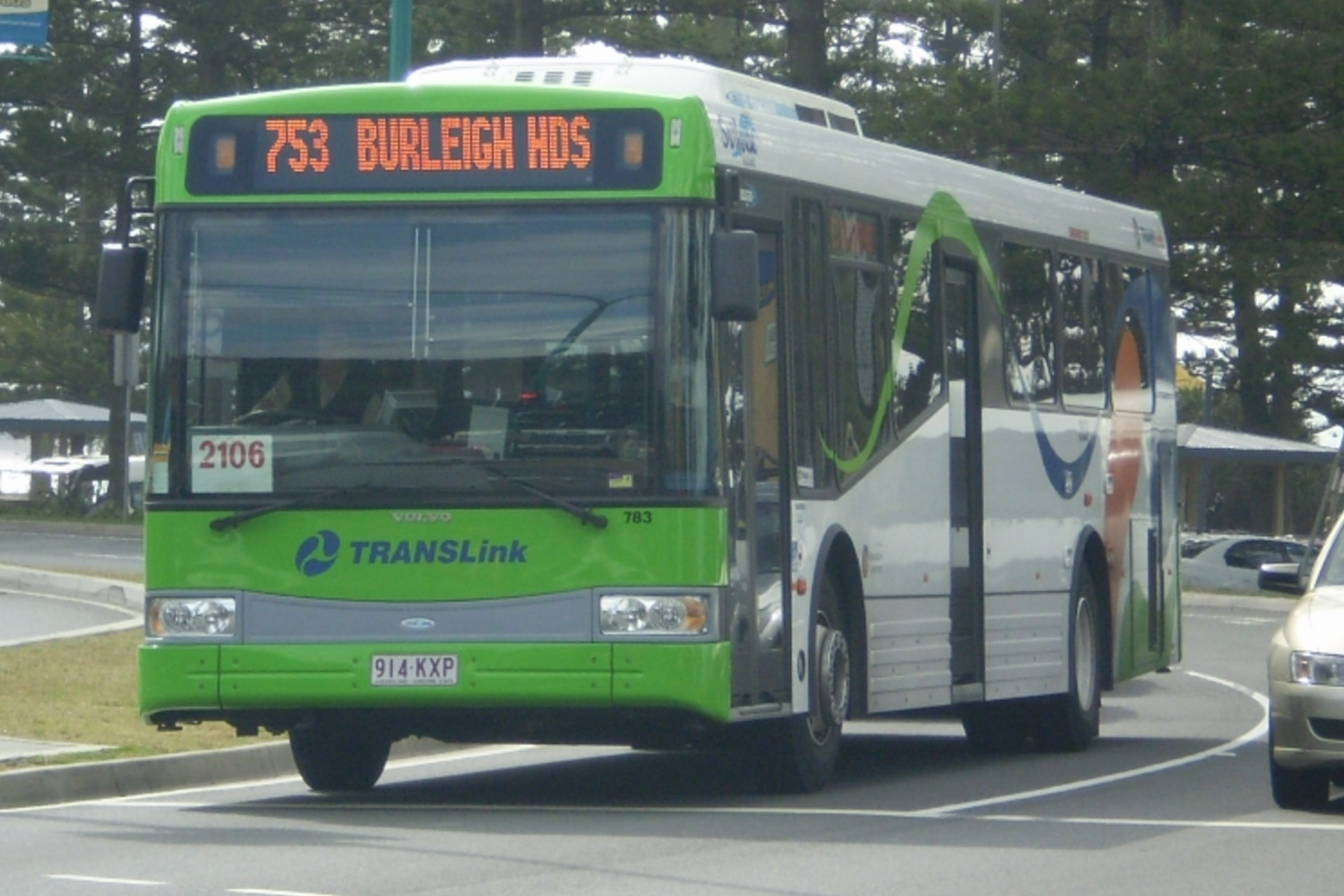
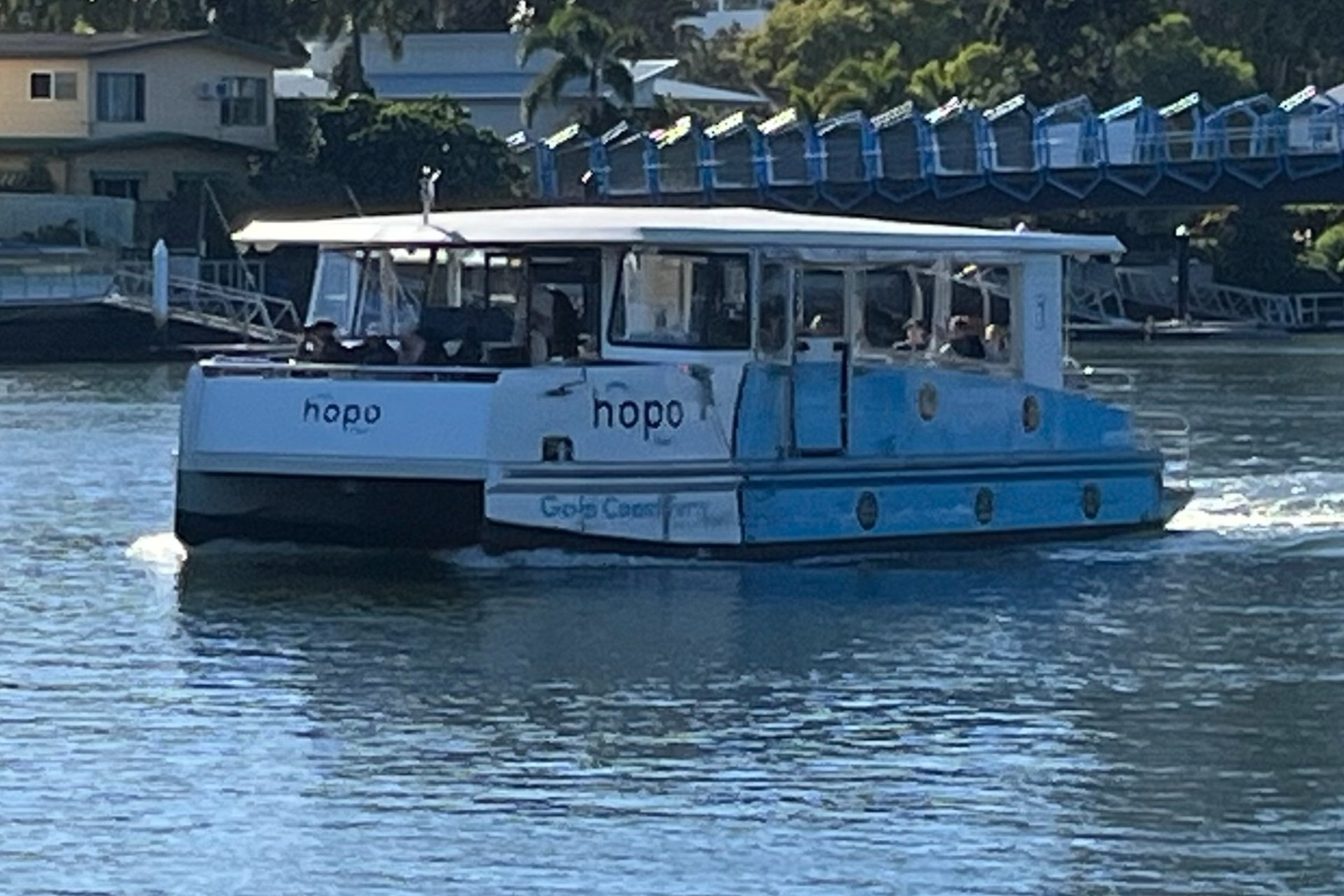
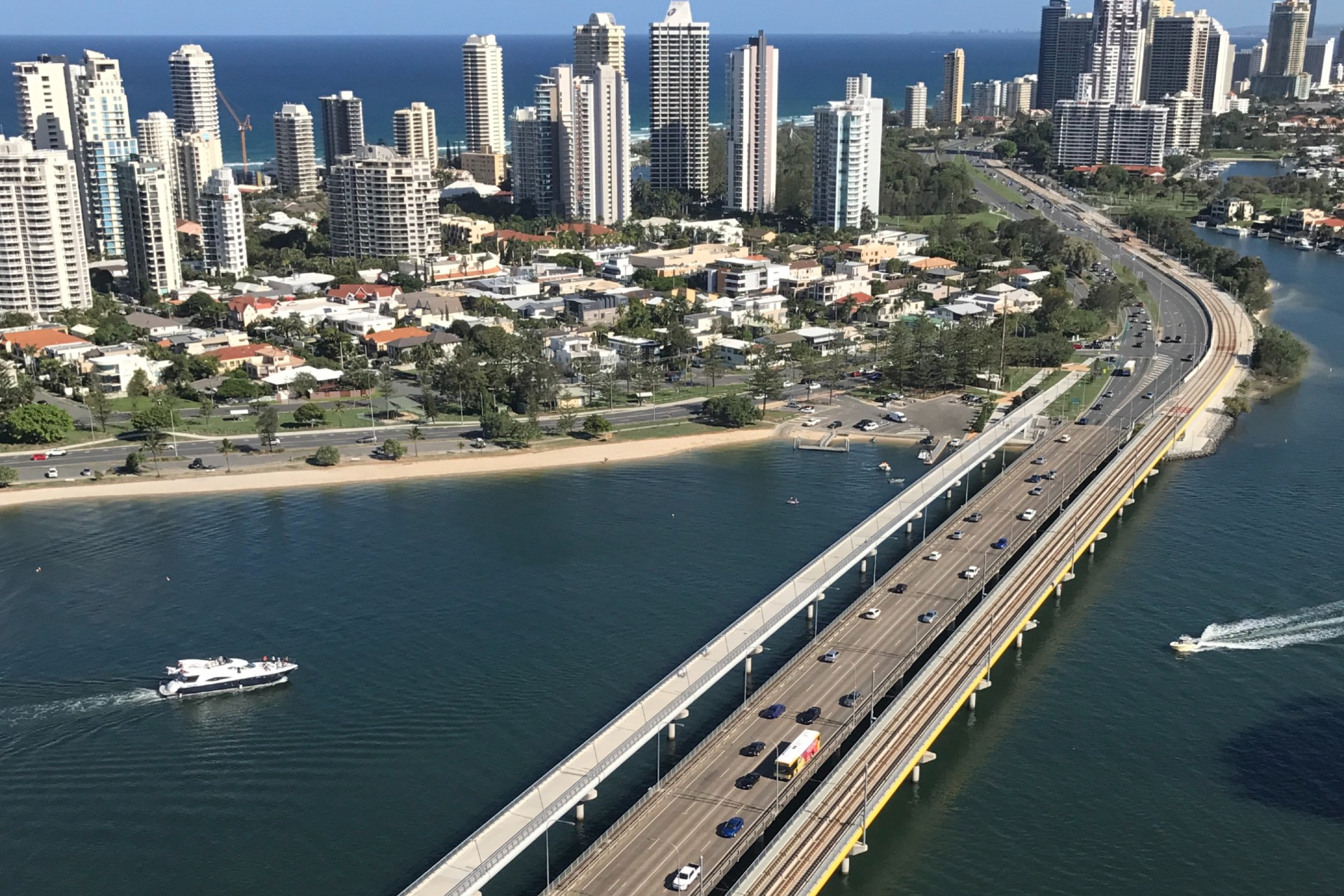
- G:link light rail vehicle at Broadbeach North Varsity Lakes station Bus to Burleigh Heads Hopo Ferry Gold Coast Highway

Overview
- Area served: Gold Coast, Queensland
- Transit type: Rail; Light rail Buses; Ferries; On-demand

Transport on the Gold Coast in Queensland, Australia, is provided by a large network of public transport operating modes including a railway line, light rail system, buses and ferries, as well as an expansive network of roadways, walking and cycling paths, and one international airport.

== Railways ==
The Beenleigh railway line opened in 1885 and was extended to Southport in 1889 as the South Coast line. A branch line to Tweed Heads in New South Wales was opened in August 1903, with the first regular passenger train making the journey from Brisbane one month later. Because of the increasing popularity of the motor car, the Tweed Heads branch closed in 1961 and the line from Beenleigh to Southport closed in 1964.

In February 1996, the new Gold Coast railway line was opened, running from Brisbane to Helensvale. It was built an extension of the Beenleigh line, running on a different alignment than the South Coast line. It was extended to Nerang in 1997 and to Robina in 1998. In 2009, the line was further extended to Varsity Lakes. As part of the Cross River Rail project, three new stations were added to the Gold Coast line: Pimpama (opened in October 2025), Hope Island (opened in May 2026) and Merrimac (scheduled to open in 2026).

Trains travel express between Boggo Road and Beenleigh, with stops at Altandi and Loganlea on the Beenleigh line. Most trains from the Gold Coast run through to Brisbane Airport as the Airtrain service, stopping at the International and Domestic terminals.

A proposal to extend the line to the Gold Coast Airport terminal has existed in the airport's master plans since 2001. In addition to the airport, three additional stations are planned at Tallebudgera, Elanora and Tugun, as part of a proposal to extend the line from Varsity Lakes.

== Light rail ==
A feasibility study for a light rail system on the Gold Coast was released in 2004. In 2009, the Queensland Government committed $464 million to the Gold Coast Rapid Transit (GCRT) project, supplementing $365 million committed by the federal government and $120 million provided by Gold Coast City Council. In September 2013, the first light rail vehicle was unveiled during a ceremony at the new depot in Southport, with the system branded as "G:link".

On 20 July 2014, the line officially opened with sixteen stations, running from Gold Coast University Hospital (GCUH) in Southport to Broadbeach South. Stage 2 of the line was announced in 2016, with three new stations connecting the line from GCUH to Helensvale railway station. Stage 3 will extend the line by 6.7 kilometres and bring the total station count to 27, extending the line to Burleigh Heads from mid-2026. A branch line from GCUH to the Harbour Town shopping centre in Biggera Waters was announced in June 2026, with the project is expected to be completed before the start of the Brisbane Olympics in July 2032.

The Stage 4 extension, which would have run to Coolangatta via the Gold Coast Airport, was cancelled by the Crisafulli state government in September 2025. In June 2026, the GC Surfer – a bus rapid transit line running from Robina railway station to Coolangatta – was announced as a replacement for Stage 4.

On 9 August 2026, the light rail line was extended from Broadbeach South to Burleigh Heads.

== Buses ==
Kinetic Gold Coast operates its Queensland services under contract to Translink.

Buses generally operate on a 05:00 to midnight timetable throughout the week, with some Friday and Saturday night 24-hour services.

=== List of bus routes ===
Route	Image	Destinations	via	Notes
70		Helensvale station Burleigh Heads station		Operates on the G:link L1 line between midnight and 4am (Monday to Thursday) when the light rail does not run
700		Stockland Burleigh Heads Tweed Heads	Burleigh Heads station	Previous northern terminus at Broadbeach South station (or GCUH station for weekday overnights)
701		Robina station The Pines Elanora	Varsity Lakes station, Burleigh Heads station	Introduced on 7 September 2026
704		Helensvale station Sea World	Southport station, Southport South station	
705		Sea World Broadbeach South station	Surfers Paradise, Pacific Fair	
709		Helensvale station Hope Island	Hope Island station	
710		Helensvale station Griffith University station	Parkwood, GCUH station	
711		Southport station Hope Island station	Runaway Bay	
712		Southport station Coombabah	Harbour Town	
713		Southport station Paradise Point	Harbour Town	
714		Helensvale station Griffith University station	Pacific Pines, GCUH station	
715		Helensvale station Southport station	Pacific Pines, Parkwood station, Arundel	
716		Helensvale station Studio Village Helensvale station		Operates as a loop
717		Helensvale station Pacific Pines		
718		Helensvale station Santa Barbara		
719		Paradise Point Southport station	Griffith University station, GCUH station, Harbour Town	
720		Ormeau station Coomera station	Pimpama, Upper Coomera	
721		Pimpama Coomera station	Pimpama station	
722		Pimpama station Coomera station		
723		Coomera station Helensvale station	Oxenford	
724		Pimpama Coomera station	Pimpama station	
725		Coomera station Sanctuary Cove	Upper Coomera, Hope Island station	
726		Coomera station Coomera Waters		
727		Coomera station Helensvale station	Upper Coomera	
728		Beenleigh station Ormeau station	Yatala	
729		Beenleigh station Ormeau station	Yatala	
731		Southport station Broadbeach South station	Southport South station, Isle of Capri	
732		Pimpama Coomera station	Pimpama station	
733		Jacobs Well Pimpama station		
735		Southport station Nerang station	Ashmore	
736		Nerang station Broadbeach South station	Highland Park	
737		Southport station Ashmore		
738		Griffith University station Broadbeach South station	Ashmore	
739		Griffith University station Nerang station	Ashmore	
740		Nerang station Surfers Paradise	Ashmore	
741		Southport station Broadbeach South station	Ashmore	
742		Molendinar Southport station	Ashmore	
743		Nerang station Broadbeach South station	Carrara	
744		Nerang station Broadbeach South station	Highland Park	
745		Nerang station Broadbeach South station		
746		Nerang West Nerang station		
747		Southport station Robina station	Southport South station, Bundall	
748		Robina Town Centre Nerang station	Robina station, Gilston, Worongary, Mudgeeraba	
749		Clearwater Nerang station		
750		Broadbeach South station Robina station	Bond University	
751		Broadbeach South station Robina station	Mermaid Waters	
752		Broadbeach South station Robina station	Robina Woods	
753		Broadbeach South station Burleigh Heads station	Robina, Varsity Lakes station	
754		Broadbeach South station The Pines Elanora	Mermaid Waters, Burleigh Heads station	
755		Broadbeach South station Robina Town Centre	Merrimac	
756		Broadbeach South station West Burleigh	Miami	
757		Reedy Creek Burleigh Heads station	Varsity Lakes station	
758		Robina Town Centre Merrimac	Robina station, Mudgeeraba	
759		Robina station Varsity Lakes station	Reedy Creek	
760		Robina Town Centre Tweed Heads	Varsity Lakes station, Gold Coast Airport	
763		Lakewoods The Pines Elanora	Elanora	
764		The Pines Elanora Currumbin Park		
765		Robina station Christine Avenue station	Burleigh Waters	
766		The Pines Elanora Currumbin Waters		
767		The Pines Elanora Tugun The Pines Elanora	Currumbin	Operates as a loop
768		The Pines Elanora Tweed Heads	John Flynn Private Hospital	
777		Stockland Burleigh Heads Gold Coast Airport	Burleigh Heads station	Northern terminus at Broadbeach South until 7 September 2026; limited-stop express
TX7		Coomera station Helensvale station	Dreamworld, Movie World, Wet'n'Wild	Runs to theme parks on the Gold Coast

== Walking and cycling ==
=== Walking ===
The Gold Coast has extensive paths one of which is called the Gold Coast Oceanway which is a 36 kilometres (22 mi) network of pathways along the coastline. Locals residents and visitors alike often walk to the beach, shops or anywhere nearby, particularly so in areas of high-density living.

The Gold Coast hinterland also embraces the World Heritage listed Lamington National Park, established in 1915, with over 160 kilometres (99 mi) of graded walking tracks maintained by the Queensland National Parks and Wildlife Service. The development of the national park tracks and accommodation at Binna Burra Lodge owe a great deal to the work of Romeo Lahey and Arthur Groom in the 1920s and 1930s.

=== Cycling ===
The Gold Coast is largely flat providing excellent opportunities for cycling, most major road corridors have dedicated cycle lanes located on the roads. The river corridors provide opportunities to link west from the Gold Coast Oceanway out to the hinterland. The V1 is an emerging cycle route along the M1 motorway corridor from Smith Street, Gaven to the Logan River at Beenleigh. In the future it will be extended southwards along the M1 corridor through Nerang, Robina, Varsity Lakes, West Burleigh, Palm Beach and behind the Gold Coast Airport to the New South Wales state border.

The Gold Coast City Council has taken action in recent years to promote active travel. Mobike is a bike sharing company that operates in the city under contract from the council. Rather than only being able to access bikes from designated locations, this scheme allows people to borrow a bike wherever there is one available, and ride it to the desired destination without the need to return it to a 'docking station'. However, users can access up to 34 preferred bike parking areas known as 'Mobike Preferred Locations'. These areas are located beside key transport interchanges and existing city infrastructure, and they are easily identified by Mobike signs and ground markings.

== Road network ==
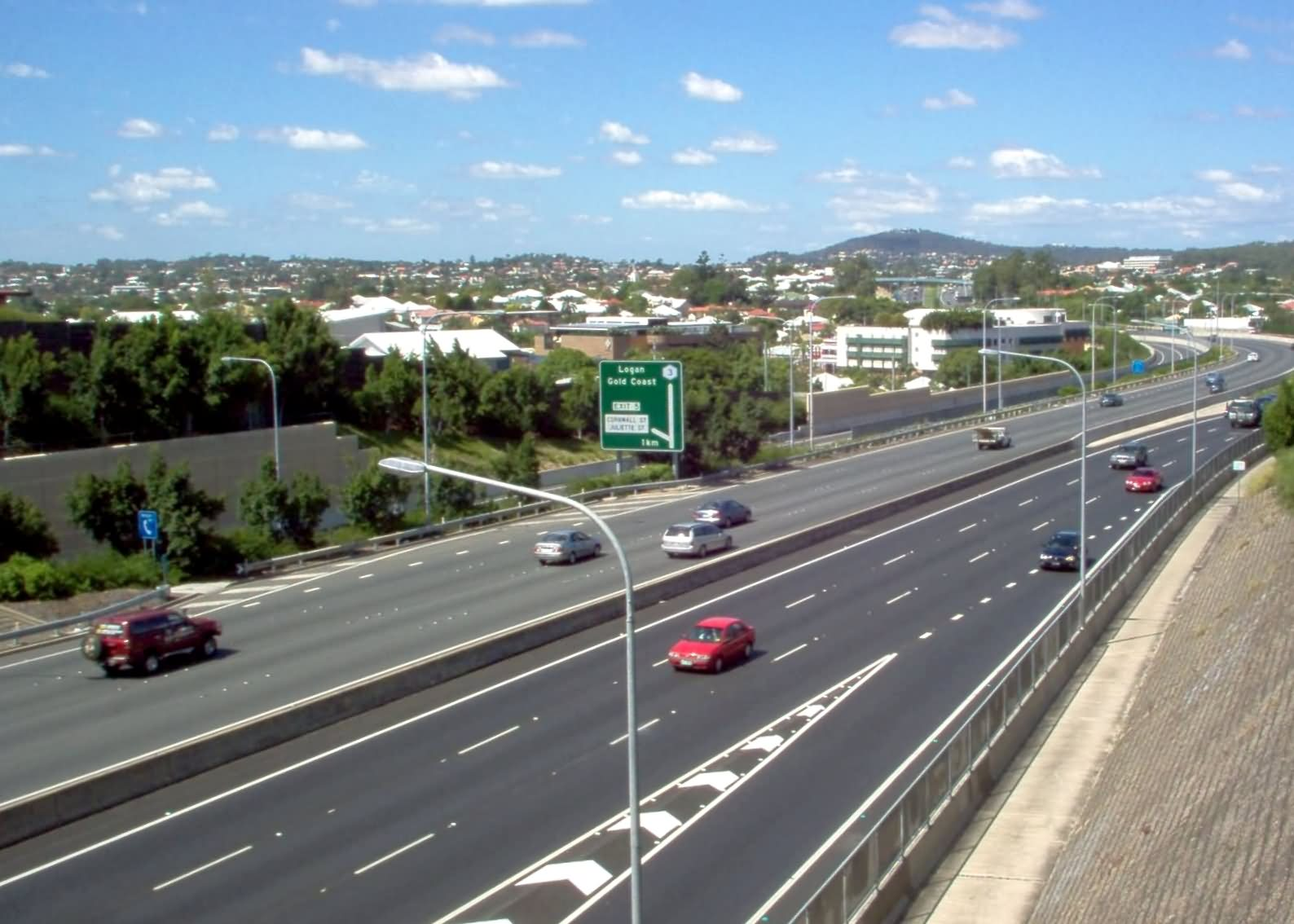
Pacific Motorway, the city's main connection to Brisbane and Northern New South Wales.

The Gold Coast main mode of transport is by private vehicles which has resulted in the city having an extensive road network for an Australian regional city. Gold Coast's road are managed by all three level of Governments.

The Australian Federal Government is responsible for the maintaining the Pacific Motorway (M1), the city's main thoroughfare and a recognised nation freight route. Pacific Motorway commences in the Brisbane CBD and travels south passing through the western suburbs of the Gold Coast and continues on through Northern New South Wales.

Department of Transport and Main Roads, A division of the Queensland Government manages all state regionsied routes throughout Queensland. State designated routes can be identified by a white number inside a blue shield. The Gold Coast state routes typically commence from the Pacific Motorway and connect with major commercial and residential hubs. State roads travelling in a north to south direction will be designated in single digits where as state roads travelling in an east to west direction will be designated in double digits.

The suburban road network is maintained by the Gold Coast City Council.

== Public transport ==
Gold Coast's public transport system consists of heavy rail, buses, light rail & ferries.

Translink is a division of the Department of Transport and Main Roads that manages the planning, co-ordination, integrated ticketing and zoning for public transport services covering Brisbane and the rest of South East Queensland. It contracts Queensland Rail, Kinetic Gold Coast and Keolis Downer (Gold Coast light rail operator) to operate public transport services in allocated operating areas for a negotiated price, and keeps all fare receipts. Passengers pay common fares, based on the number of zones travelled through, on all the public transport modes covered including trains, buses and light rail, irrespective of who operates the service. In 2007, Translink introduced the go card smartcard-based ticketing system. Paper tickets are still available, but travel using the go card costs significantly less than using a paper ticket.

Rail services are operated by Queensland Rail which provides Citytrain services on the Gold Coast Railway line from the southern terminus in Varsity Lakes on the Gold Coast to Brisbane Airport via Brisbane City. Light Rail services are operated by Keolis Downer (branded as G:link) which operate a single 20 kilometre line from Broadbeach South to Helensvale via the key activity precincts of Surfers Paradise and Southport. Kinetic Group under contract from Translink provides an extensive bus network of 56 bus routes that includes high frequency and suburban services.

After some years of decline, the Gold Coast public transport system is being revitalised and finding greater patronage, with significant investment in light rail construction and extensions, a completely reorganised and simplified bus network.

=== Ferries ===
The newest public transport operator is Hopo Ferries. The service stops at 5 wharfs between Sea World and Surfers Paradise. It connects with a number of local bus services and G:link tram stations.

=== Major transport hubs ===
There are several major transport hubs on the Gold Coast that offer connecting services to the Light Rail, Bus and Heavy Rail network.

Major transport hubs include;

- Tweed Mall Shopping centre, located in adjacent town of Tweed Heads in New South Wales offers connecting bus services to Kinetic Group New South Wales services.
- Varsity Lakes railway station, offers connecting services to the Gold Coast railway line and bus connections to southern suburbs.
- Broadbeach South bus and light rail interchange, offers connecting G:link light rail services and bus connections to western and southern suburbs.
- Robina Railway station, offers connecting train and bus services to Eastern suburbs.
- Nerang Railway station, offers connecting train and bus services to Eastern suburbs
- Southport bus and light rail interchange, provides a G:link and bus interchange for the Gold Coast Central Business District.
- Helensvale Light and Heavy Rail Interchange, provides Queensland's first tri-model interchange, providing connecting services to the train, bus and light rail network.
- Ormeau railway station, provides connecting bus services to northern Gold Coast suburbs as well the City of Logan which forms part of the Greater Brisbane Metropolitan area.

== Airports ==
Due to the Gold Coast's close proximity to Brisbane, the city has two international airports servicing the Gold Coast.

=== Gold Coast Airport ===
The Gold Coast Airport serves domestic and international destinations which services the City of Gold Coast and the Northern Rivers Region of New South Wales. The entrance to the airport is situated in the suburb of Bilinga of the Gold Coast Highway while the runway itself straddles the state border of Queensland and New South Wales. During summer, these states are in two different time zones. The Gold Coast Airport operates on Queensland Time all year round (year-round AEST / UTC+10).

For the 2015–16 financial year, Gold Coast Airport exceeded 6 million passengers. It is the sixth-busiest airport in Australia, and the busiest outside a state capital, in terms of passengers, and eighth-busiest in aircraft movements. It is also the third-fastest-growing airport in the country.

=== Brisbane Airport ===
Brisbane Airport is the primary domestic and international airport servicing South East Queensland. Brisbane Airport is located in Queensland's state capital of Brisbane and is only a one-hour drive from the Gold Coast CBD in Southport to the Airport. The airport services 31 airlines flying to 50 domestic and 29 international destinations, in total amounting in more than 22.9 million passengers who travelled through the airport in 2017.

The airport has two railway stations as part of a privately owned airport rail line. The international terminal railway station is elevated and located next to the international terminal, as is the domestic railway station. The Airtrain Citylink travels via the Queensland Rail Citytrain network to Brisbane CBD, trains continuing to the Gold Coast, terminating at Varsity Lakes.

== Future infrastructure ==
Gold Coast is one of the fastest-growing cities in Australia and this has caused a growing problem with congestion, with much of the existing road network approaching capacity. All three levels of government in Australia have been exploring options to reduce congestion on Gold Coast roads and to reduce travel time.

=== Pacific Motorway upgrade ===
The Pacific Motorway is one Australia's busiest highways and is a national freight route, it is estimated that up to 155, 000 vehicles use the Gold Coast section of the motorway each day with this figure forecasted to rise. The Queensland State Government and Australian Federal Government are jointly working together to upgrade the Pacific Motorway.

==== Mudgeeraba to Varsity Lakes ====
The Australian Federal Government and Queensland State Government are currently working together to widen 5.7 kilometers of Pacific Motorway from 2 lanes to 3 lanes in each direction between Mudgeeraba to Varsity Lakes. The project is expected to be completed by mid–2020.

==== Varsity Lakes to Tugun ====
The widening and upgrade of the Pacific Motorway between Varsity Lakes and Tugun is currently in the planning stages with the project estimated to cost around 1.036 billion to complete.

=== Gold Coast Light Rail extension ===
There is currently strong political support for the G:link light rail system to be extended south to the Gold Coast Airport with Gold Coast City Council endorsing support for the extension to the airport in 2016.

==== Stage 3B – Gold Coast Airport extension ====
The Gold Coast City Council released a list of potential routes for stage three in November 2015 and invited public comment. Ideas included a southern extension from Broadbeach South to Burleigh Heads, two options from Nobby Beach to Robina station, from Varsity Lakes station to Burleigh Heads, from Varsity Lakes station to Gold Coast Airport and two options from Burleigh Heads to Gold Coast Airport. 3606 people responded to the survey. Nearly 80 percent supported an extension to Burleigh Heads and 70 percent also supported a further extension to the airport.

The council's Gold Coast City Transport Strategy 2031 supports a future expansion to the airport. The 14 kilometer extension of the light rail line from the proposed Burleigh Heads station would continue south along the Gold Coast Highway, passing through the southern suburbs of Palm Beach and Tugun before terminating at the Airport.

=== Heavy rail extension ===
There have been numerous proposal over the years to extend the existing railway corridor from Varsity Lakes to the Gold Coast Airport. The Queensland Government's Department of Transport and Main Roads completed planning for a proposed extension to the airport in 2005 with additional planning undertaken in 2009 to establish a preferred corridor. The first stage was completed to Varsity Lakes station was completed in 2009 but the second stage has been meet with a number of setbacks and budget constraints. The Queensland Government still plans to extend the line with stations proposed at Tallebudgera, Elanora, Tugun and the Gold Coast Airport however the state government is not likely to start construction till after the Brisbane's Cross River Rail project is completed to increase South East Queensland rail network capacity.

=== City Transport Strategy 2031 ===
The Gold Coast City Transport Strategy 2031 is a report released by Gold Coast City Council in March 2013, which outlines the council's long-term strategy for public transport, as well as objectives and challenges facing the Gold Coast. It supports multiple extensions of the light rail line, including to Robina, Nerang, Bundall and Biggera Waters.

== See also ==
- Bus transport in Queensland
- Transportation in Australia
- Rail transport in Queensland
