= Robina Town Centre bus station =

Bus station in Queensland, Australia

Robina Town Centre
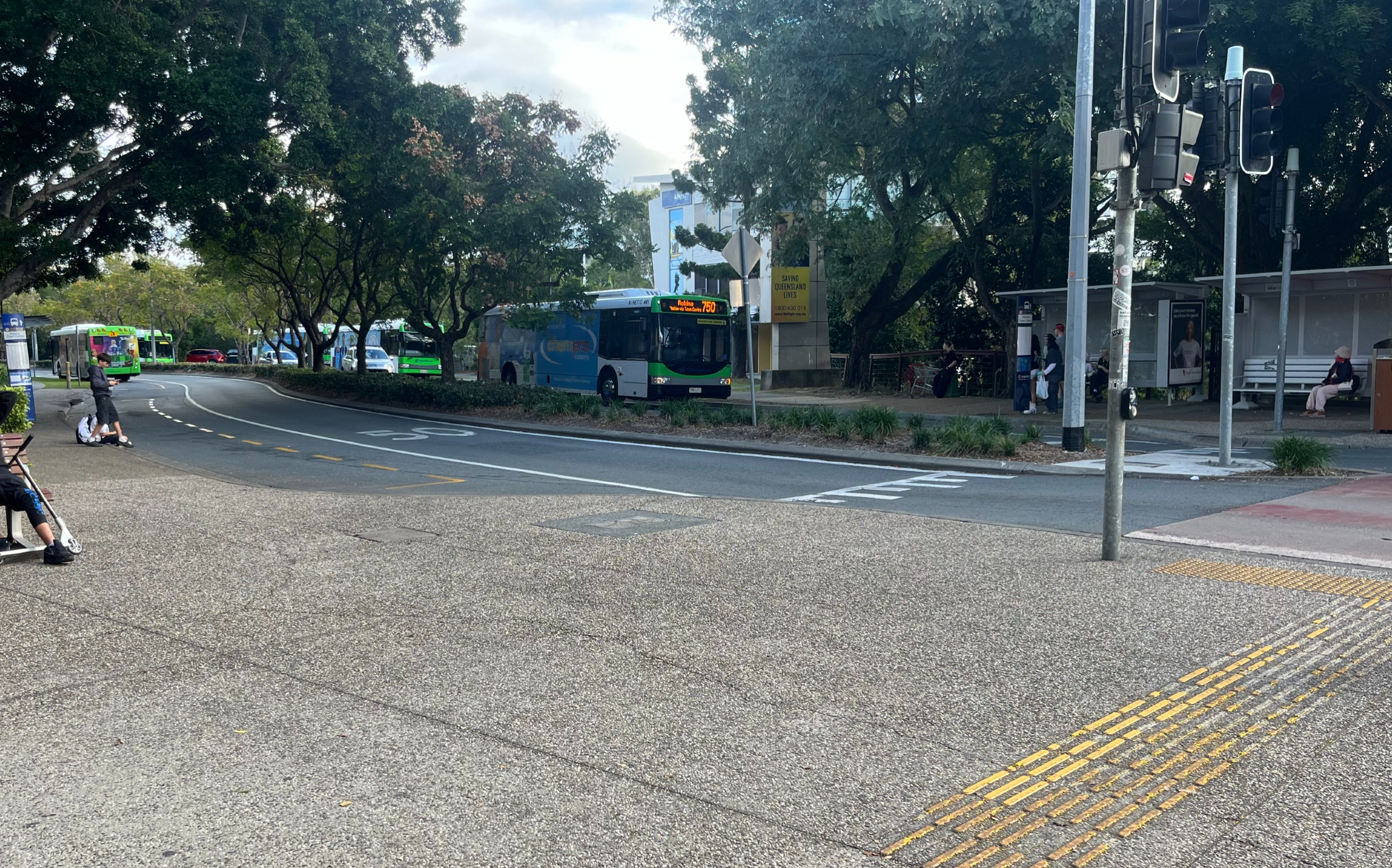
- Robina Town Centre bus station in July 2026

General information
- Location: Robina Town Centre Drive; Robina, Queensland
- Coordinates: 28.078008°S 153.383092°E
- Operator: Translink
- Bus routes: 701 747 748 750 751 752 755 758 759 760 765
- Bus stands: 2

Construction
- Accessible: Yes

Other information
- Station code: 300042
- Website: Translink

History
- Opened: 28 April 1996; 30 years ago
Services
Preceding station	Translink	Following station
Robina Terminus	701	Christine Avenue towards The Pines Elanora
Robina Town Centre Drive towards Southport	747	Robina Terminus
Robina towards Nerang	748	Terminus
Christine Avenue towards Broadbeach South	750	Robina Terminus
Christine Avenue towards Broadbeach South	751	Robina Terminus
Robina towards Broadbeach South	752	Terminus
Robina towards Broadbeach South	755	Terminus
Robina towards Ghilgai Road	758	Terminus
Robina Terminus	759	Swanton Drive towards Varsity Lakes
Terminus	760	Christine Avenue towards Tweed Heads
Terminus	765	Christine Avenue towards The Pines Elanora
Location

Robina Town Centre is a bus station operated by Translink that serves the Gold Coast suburb of Robina. It is a ground level station, featuring two side platforms. The station is located adjacent to Robina Town Centre, a large shopping centre that includes around 400 stores.

== History ==
Bus services at Robina Town Centre began operating when the shopping centre opened on 28 April 1996.

On 22 February 2010, bus route 747 was introduced as a trial service to provide a direct connection from Robina Town Centre to Southport. The trial was funded by Gold Coast City Council and was later made permanent.

In 2014, transport advocacy group RAIL Back On Track criticised the design of Robina Town Centre bus station because of its lack of facilities for drivers or dedicated layover spaces.

Route 701 was introduced on 7 September 2026 as a new bus service with 15-minute frequency that connects Robina Town Centre to The Pines, another major shopping centre on the Gold Coast, which is located in the suburb of Elanora.

The bus station is closely linked to Robina railway station, which is located 800 metres (2,600 ft) north-west of the shopping centre. Excluding the railway station, it is also the closest bus station to Robina Stadium, which is approximately 1.4 kilometres (0.87 mi) away. Robina Town Centre is linked to Nerang railway station through route 748 and to Varsity Lakes railway station through routes 701, 759, 760 and 765. Additionally, there are connections to the G:link light rail line through routes 750 and 755 (travelling to Broadbeach South) and routes 701 and 765 (travelling via Burleigh Heads).

=== Future proposals ===
Robina Town Centre is expected to serve as a major stop on the Robina–Coolangatta and Robina–Miami routes of the GC Surfer, a bus rapid transit system that is expected to be operational before the start of the Brisbane Olympics in July 2032.

The Gold Coast City Council's City Transport Strategy 2031 report, published in March 2013, proposes an extension of the light rail system to Robina through a branch line that would include a station at Robina Town Centre. Two additional rapid bus routes that would serve the shopping centre were also proposed. In late 2015, a proposal for a light rail extension from Nobby Beach to Robina – which included a station at Robina Town Centre – was released for public consultation by Gold Coast City Council.

== Platforms and services ==
Robina Town Centre serves as the terminus for routes 748, 752, 755, 758, 760 and 765, while routes 701, 747, 750, 751 and 759 terminate at Robina railway station.

Robina Town Centre platform arrangement
Platform	Route	Direction	Notes
1	701 747 748 750 751 752 755 758 759 760 765	Inbound	
2	701 747 748 750 751 752 755 758 759 760 765	Outbound	

== See also ==
- The Pines Elanora bus station
