= GC Surfer =

Proposed bus rapid transit system on the Gold Coast, Australia

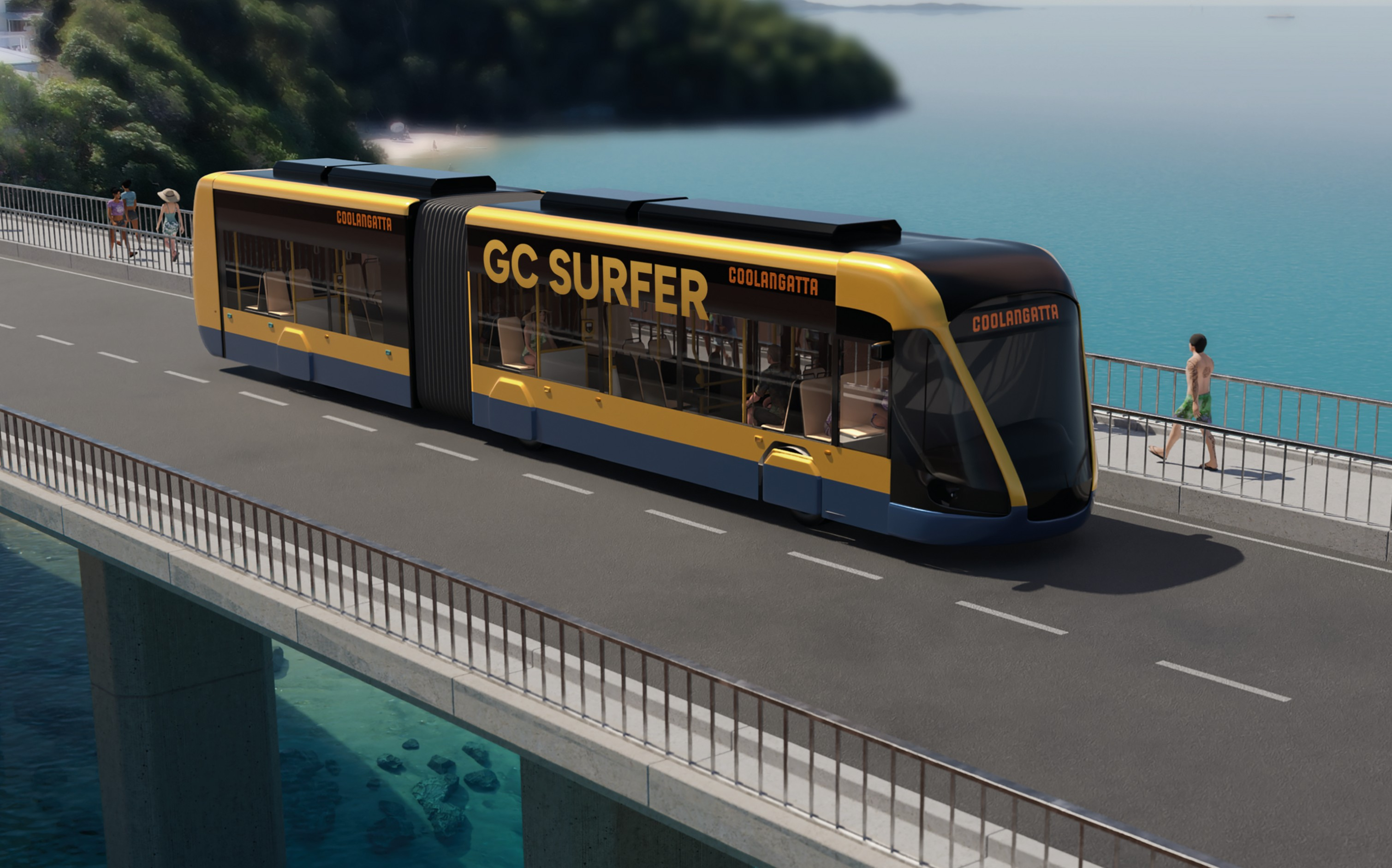
- Proposed GC Surfer render on a bridge

Overview
- Locale: Gold Coast, Queensland
- Transit type: Bus rapid transit
- Number of lines: 3 (proposed)

Operation
- Operation will start: TBD
- Headway: 10–15 minutes

The GC Surfer (also known as the Gold Coast Surfer or The Surfer) is a proposed bus rapid transit system on the Gold Coast in Queensland, Australia. It is expected have three routes, connecting Gold Coast Airport, the Gold Coast railway line and the G:link light rail line.

The system will consist of articulated buses, similar to the Brisbane Metro. The project aims to reduce congestion and improve public transport connection on the Gold Coast.

== Background ==
The Gold Coast City Transport Strategy 2031 proposed an extension (known as Stage 4) of the G:link light rail system from Burleigh Heads to Coolangatta, which would follow the route of the Gold Coast Highway. On 1 September 2025, the Crisafulli state government announced that the extension would be cancelled and the Department of Transport and Main Roads would undertake a transport study to determine future public transport upgrades in the area.

On 22 June 2026, the GC Surfer was announced as a replacement for the stage 4 light rail extension. It is expected to have ten-minute frequency and follow the route of the cancelled light rail extension from Coolangatta to Burleigh Heads. The route is also proposed to connect to the Gold Coast railway line at Robina and Varsity Lakes stations. It is expected to be operational before the start of the Brisbane Olympics in July 2032, playing a major role in transporting visitors from the Gold Coast Airport.

After the project was announced, there was speculation about the use of bus lanes for the GC Surfer. Gold Coast mayor Tom Tate and Burleigh MP Hermann Vorster stated that no bus lanes would be built, whilst Bonney MP Sam O'Connor later clarified that the use of bus lanes had not been ruled out by the Queensland Government. Nine News later reported that the project would use signal priority, rather than bus lanes.

On 31 July 2026, two further routes were announced for the project, which are expected to have 15-minute frequencies. This includes a route between Robina railway station and Miami light rail station (serving Bond University) and a route between Nerang railway station and Broadbeach South light rail station (serving Carrara Stadium). The additional routes will require expanded bus stations and upgrades to local roads, including Nerang–Broadbeach Road, which will be widened from four to six lanes between Nielsens Road and Gooding Drive and include a new pedestrian overpass at the Gold Coast Sports Precinct.

== Network and operations ==
=== Fleet ===
The GC Surfer fleet will consist of high capacity buses, similar to the model used on the Brisbane Metro. The exterior of the buses will be modelled off light rail vehicles and will have a yellow livery, in a similar design to the G:link trams.

=== Proposed stations ===
The following stations were confirmed by the Queensland Government when the project was announced. Further stations are likely to be announced when planning progresses.

==== Robina–Coolangatta ====
Station	Suburb	Public transport connections
Robina	Robina	Gold Coast railway line, Gold Coast bus services
Robina Town Centre	Robina	Gold Coast bus services
Varsity Lakes	Varsity Lakes	Gold Coast railway line, Gold Coast bus services
Burleigh Heads	Burleigh Heads	G:link, Gold Coast bus services
Gold Coast Airport	Bilinga	Gold Coast bus services, Long distance coaches
Coolangatta	Coolangatta	Tweed Heads bus services, Gold Coast bus services

==== Robina–Miami ====
Station	Suburb	Public transport connections
Robina	Robina	Gold Coast railway line, Gold Coast bus services
Robina Town Centre	Robina	Gold Coast bus services
Bond University	Robina	Gold Coast bus services
Miami North	Miami	G:link

==== Nerang–Broadbeach ====
Station	Suburb	Public transport connections
Nerang	Nerang	Gold Coast railway line, Gold Coast bus services
Carrara Stadium	Carrara	Gold Coast bus services
Broadbeach South	Broadbeach	G:link, Gold Coast bus services
