= Merrimac railway station =

Planned railway station in Queensland, Australia

Merrimac
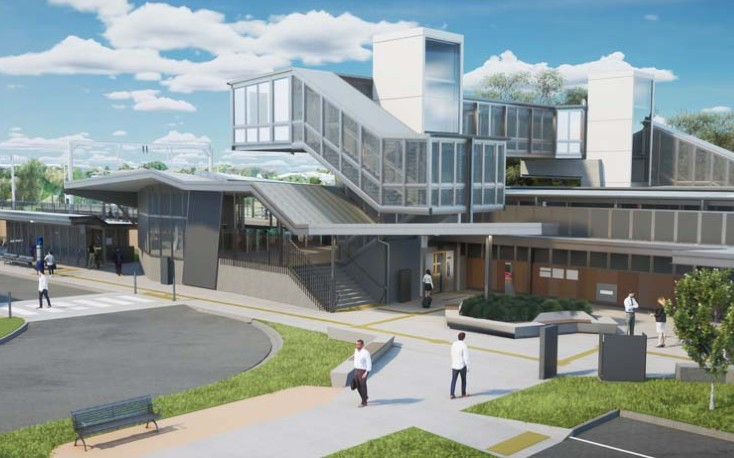
- Digital illustration of Merrimac railway station

General information
- Location: Gooding Drive, Merrimac
- Coordinates: 28.049°S 153.363°E
- Owner: Queensland Rail
- Operator: Queensland Rail
- Line: T5 Varsity Lakes
- Distance: 82.4 km
- Platforms: 2 (2 side)
- Tracks: 2

Construction
- Structure type: Ground
- Platform levels: 1
- Parking: 275
- Cycle facilities: 40 spaces
- Accessible: yes

Other information
- Status: Under construction
- Fare zone: Zone 5

History
- Opening: After mid-2026 (planned)

Services
Preceding station	Queensland Rail	Following station
Nerang towards Domestic Airport via Roma Street	T5 Varsity Lakes line	Robina towards Varsity Lakes
Location

Merrimac is an under-construction railway station operated by Queensland Rail on the Varsity Lakes line. It is scheduled to open after mid-2026 and will serve the Gold Coast suburbs of Merrimac, Worongary and Carrara. It will be a ground level station, featuring two side platforms.

== History ==
The Gold Coast railway line opened in stages from 1996 - 2009. During its construction, provisions were made for a future station at Merrimac however due to low development in the area, the station was never built. In November 2017, the Queensland Government committed to building three new in-fill stations on the Gold Coast Line as part of the AU$5.4 billion Cross River Rail project—Pimpama, Hope Island and Merrimac. It is currently anticipated that more than 2,000 passengers will use Merrimac station per day when it becomes operational. The station is expected to cost up to $40 million to construct, and is planned to be open in 2026, in time for the commencement of services on the new Cross River Rail line.

The planned location for Merrimac station is off Gooding Drive, about 750 m (2500 ft) east of the Pacific Motorway interchange. The station will be integrated with other modes of public transport, and is planned to feature connections with pedestrian and bicycle paths. The station concept design currently includes space for 278 car park bays.

After the preliminary concept design details of Merrimac station were revealed by the Queensland Government in October 2019, City of Gold Coast councillor Glenn Tozer expressed concern over the station's planned location. He noted that road congestion in the station's proposed area was already an issue due to local school traffic and the lane merge at the Pacific Motorway interchange. Tozer suggested an alternative location for the station about 1.6 km (1.0 mi) further north, off Elysium Road in the neighbouring suburb of Carrara. He claimed that this location would be ideal due to its proximity to an existing industrial precinct and the planned $1 billion Pacific View Estate major residential development.

== Platforms and services ==
Merrimac platform arrangement
Platform	Line	Destination	Notes
1	T5 Varsity Lakes	Varsity Lakes	
2	T5 Varsity Lakes	Roma Street (to Brisbane Airport line)	
