= Ormeau railway station =

Railway station in Queensland, Australia

Ormeau
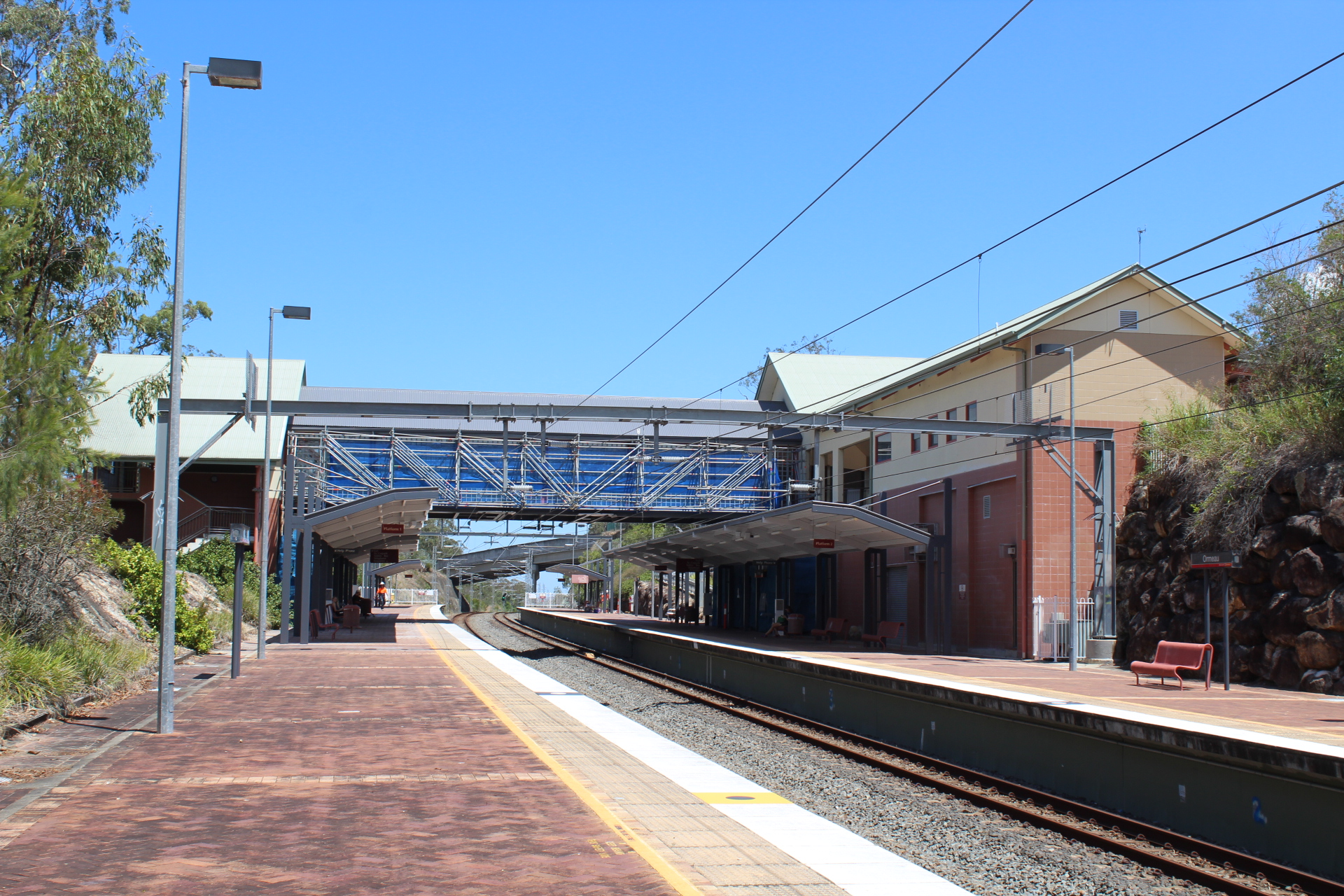
- Ormeau station in December 2017

General information
- Location: Mirambeena Drive, Pimpama
- Coordinates: 27°47′57″S 153°16′56″E
- Owner: Queensland Rail
- Operator: Queensland Rail
- Line: T5 Varsity Lakes
- Distance: 52.72 kilometres from Central
- Platforms: 2 side
- Tracks: 2

Construction
- Structure type: Ground
- Parking: 237 bays
- Cycle facilities: No
- Accessible: Yes

Other information
- Status: Staffed
- Station code: 600241 (platform 1); 600242 (platform 2)
- Fare zone: Zone 4
- Website: Queensland Rail

History
- Opened: 25 February 1996

Services
Preceding station	Queensland Rail	Following station
Beenleigh towards Domestic Airport	Varsity Lakes line	Pimpama towards Varsity Lakes
Track layout
Location

Ormeau is a railway station operated by Queensland Rail on the Varsity Lakes line. It opened on 25 February 1996 and serves the Gold Coast suburbs of Pimpama and Ormeau. It is a ground level station, featuring an island platform with two faces.

== History ==
Ormeau station opened on 25 February 1996 when the Gold Coast line opened from Beenleigh to Helensvale. It was the only station on the Gold Coast line with side platforms until when Pimpama opened.

== Services ==
Ormeau is served by Gold Coast line services from Varsity Lakes to Bowen Hills, Doomben and Brisbane Domestic Airport.

== Platforms and services ==
Ormeau platform arrangement
Platform	Line	Destination	Notes
1	T5 Varsity Lakes	Varsity Lakes	
2	T5 Varsity Lakes	Roma Street (to Brisbane Airport line)	

== Transport links ==
Kinetic Gold Coast operate four bus routes from Ormeau station:

- 720: to Coomera station via Pimpama Sports Hub
- 728: to Beenleigh station via Yatala
- 729: to Beenleigh station via Ormeau Hills
