= Gold Coast University Hospital light rail station =

Light rail station in Queensland, Australia

Gold Coast University Hospital
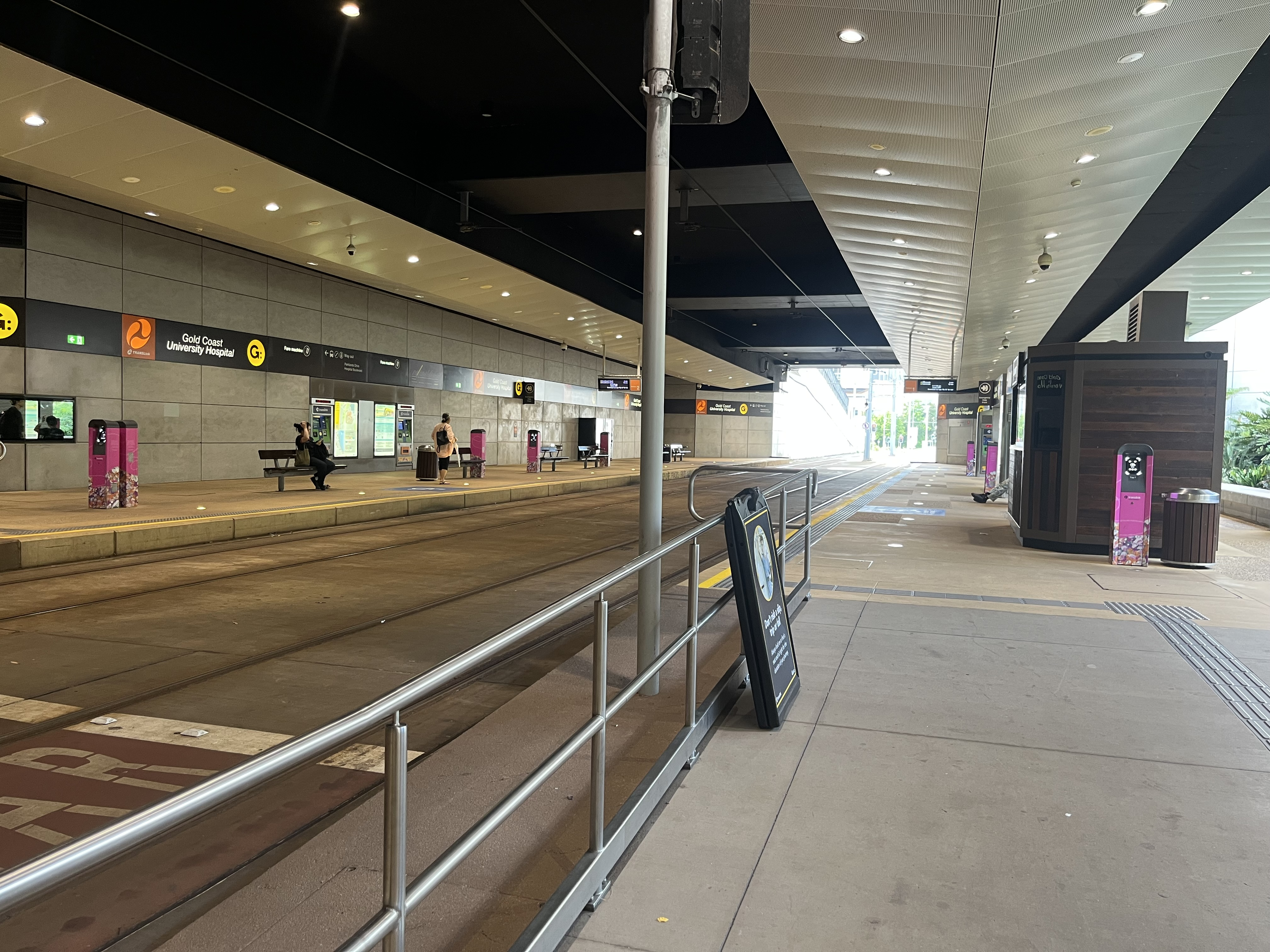
- GCUH light rail station in April 2026

General information
- Location: Parklands Drive, Southport
- Coordinates: 27°57′38″S 153°22′50″E
- Owner: GoldlinQ
- Operator: Keolis; Kinetic
- Line: L1
- Platforms: 2 (2 side)
- Tracks: 2
- Bus routes: 70 710 714 719
- Bus stands: 2

Construction
- Structure type: Underground
- Cycle facilities: Yes
- Accessible: Yes

Other information
- Station code: 600831 (platform 1); 600830 (platform 2); 318946 (bus platform 3); 318945 (bus platform 4)
- Website: Translink

History
- Opened: 20 July 2014; 12 years ago

Services
Preceding station	G:link	Following station
Parkwood East towards Helensvale	L1	Griffith University towards Burleigh Heads
Bus services
Preceding station	Translink	Following station
Parkwood East towards Helensvale	70 (Mon–Thu overnight)	Griffith University towards Burleigh Heads
Wintergreen Drive towards Helensvale	710	Griffith University Terminus
Olsen Ave towards Helensvale	714	Griffith University Terminus
Olsen Ave towards Paradise Point	719	Griffith University towards Southport
Track layout
Location

Gold Coast University Hospital (known simply as University Hospital or GCUH) is a light rail station operated by Keolis Australia on the G:link light rail line. It opened in 2014 alongside the light rail system, serving Gold Coast University Hospital and Griffith University in the Gold Coast suburb of Southport. It is an underground station, featuring two side platforms and two above ground bus stops.

The station acted as the northern terminus of the light rail line from its opening until December 2017, when the system was extended to Helensvale, although some weekend overnight services still terminated at GCUH until August 2026.

== History ==
In 1996, the Gold Coast City Council proposed building a light rail line to reduce congestion and improve public transport in the city. The 2004 draft summary report proposed a station at the Gold Coast Hospital located in Southport. The original proposed route bypassed Parklands Drive, with no station proposed in the current location of GCUH station and the original Griffith University station located on the Smith Street Motorway.

The Gold Coast University Hospital was first proposed by then-premier Peter Beattie prior to the 2006 Queensland state election, with the location selected in August 2007, partly due to the integration with the planned light rail line. Construction of the hospital commenced in December 2008 and it opened in September 2013, ten months before the light rail line began operations. The route of the light rail line was altered from the original proposal to include an underground station at the hospital.

Construction of the outer shell of GCUH station commenced in July 2010, almost two years before the construction of the line itself. It was completed one year later in July 2011, eight weeks ahead of schedule. The station opened on 20 July 2014 as the northern terminus of the line. Southbound services were able to be boarded from both underground platforms, with platform 2 extending over the tracks. Although the tunnel extended further north along the line from the station, there was a barrier across the tracks.

In August 2015, the Palazszczuk state government announced plans to construct an extension of the line from the station to Helensvale railway station, running along the Smith Street Motorway and Pacific Motorway. Construction work at GCUH station commenced in November 2016, which saw a reconfiguration of the northern tunnel exit and station platforms. A turnout from GCUH station was also built for a possible branch line extension to Biggera Waters, although that extension was not announced until June 2026.

After the extension to Helensvale opened on 18 December 2017, GCUH station was no longer the northern terminus of the line, although some evening services continued to terminate at the station. This remained the case until the opening of the extension to Burleigh Heads on 9 August 2026, when all northbound services continued through to Helensvale.

In the 2018–19 financial year, GCUH was the fifth-busiest station on the light rail line with 900,000 boardings, including an average of 3,188 boardings on weekdays.

== Platforms and services ==
Bus routes 710, 714 and 719 regularly stop at the two above-ground bus platforms at GCUH station during the day. 710 and 714 run to Helensvale station, while 719 ends in Paradise Point.

G:link services do not operate on Monday to Thursday mornings (from midnight until 4am) and are replaced by route 70, which runs along the entire light rail route from Helensvale to Burleigh Heads, stopping at GCUH. Prior to 7 September 2026, the late-night bus that replaced G:link services was route 700, which began in Tweed Heads and terminated at GCUH.

Gold Coast University Hospital platform arrangement
Platform	Line/Route	Destination	Notes
1	L1	Helensvale	
2	L1	Burleigh Heads	
3	70 710 714 719	North and west	
4	70 710 714 719	South and east	
