= Pimpama railway station =

Railway station in Queensland, Australia

Pimpama
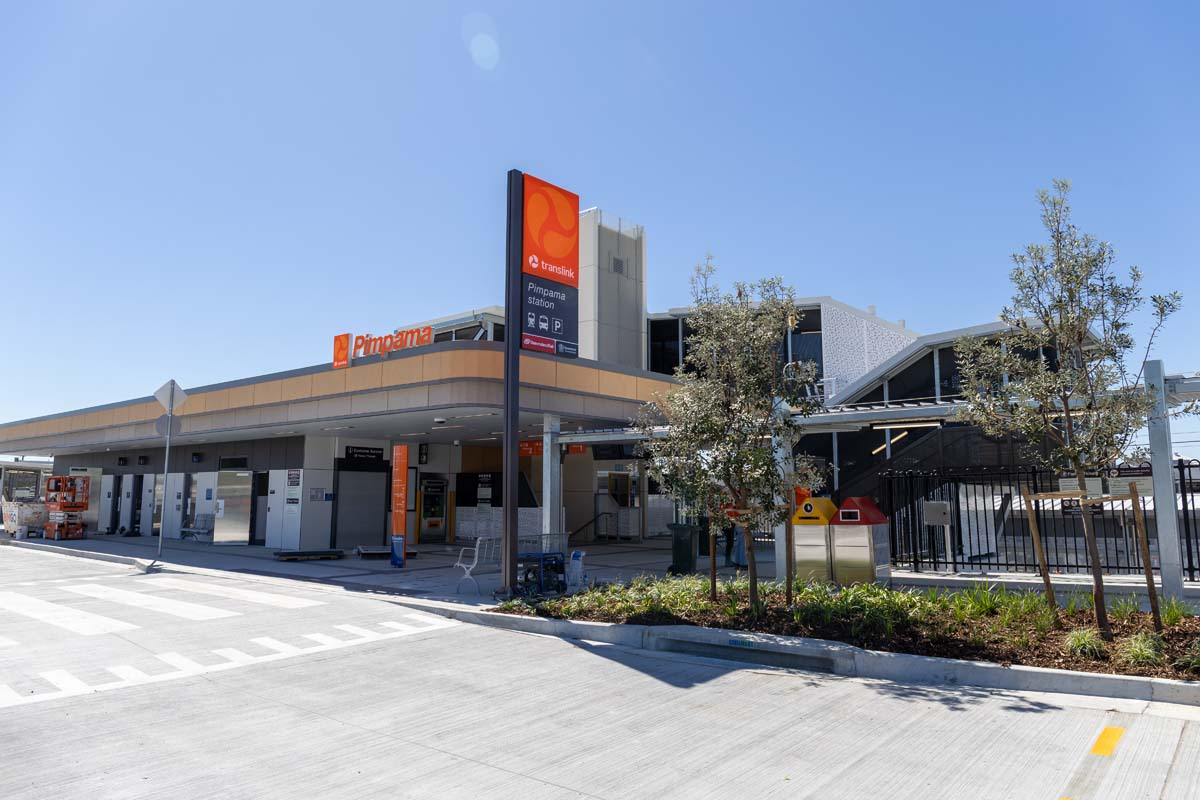
- Main entrance to Pimpama station in August 2025

General information
- Location: Old Pacific Highway, Pimpama
- Coordinates: 27.816°S 153.297°E
- Line: T5 Varsity Lakes
- Distance: 54.9 km
- Platforms: 2 (2 side)
- Tracks: 2

Construction
- Structure type: Ground
- Platform levels: 1
- Parking: 230 (initially)
- Cycle facilities: 40 spaces
- Accessible: yes

Other information
- Status: complete
- Fare zone: Zone 4

History
- Opening: 20 October 2025; 12 months ago

Services
Preceding station	Queensland Rail	Following station
Ormeau towards Domestic Airport	Varsity Lakes line	Coomera towards Varsity Lakes
Track layout
Location

Pimpama is a railway station operated by Queensland Rail on the Varsity Lakes line. It opened on 20 October 2025 and serves the Gold Coast suburb of Pimpama. It is a ground level station, featuring an island platform with two faces.

== History ==
The Gold Coast railway line opened in stages from 1996 to 2009. During its construction, provisions were made for a future station at Pimpama however due to low development in the area at the time, the station was never built when the original alignment opened.

In November 2017, the Queensland Government committed to building three new in-fill stations on the Gold Coast Line as part of the AU$5.4 billion Cross River Rail project: Pimpama, Hope Island and Merrimac. The Pimpama site was chosen in order to accommodate growing population in the region, and to alleviate pressure on the nearby Ormeau and Coomera railway stations.

ADCO Constructions was contracted to design and build the station. Construction began in late 2022, with "major works" having begun by January 2023. The station opened on 20 October 2025.

== Services ==
Pimpama is served by Gold Coast line services from Varsity Lakes to Bowen Hills, Doomben and Brisbane Domestic Airport.

== Platforms and services ==
Pimpama platform arrangement
Platform	Line	Destination	Notes
1	T5 Varsity Lakes	Varsity Lakes	
2	T5 Varsity Lakes	Roma Street (to Brisbane Airport line)	
