= Broadbeach South light rail station =

Light rail station in Queensland, Australia

Broadbeach South
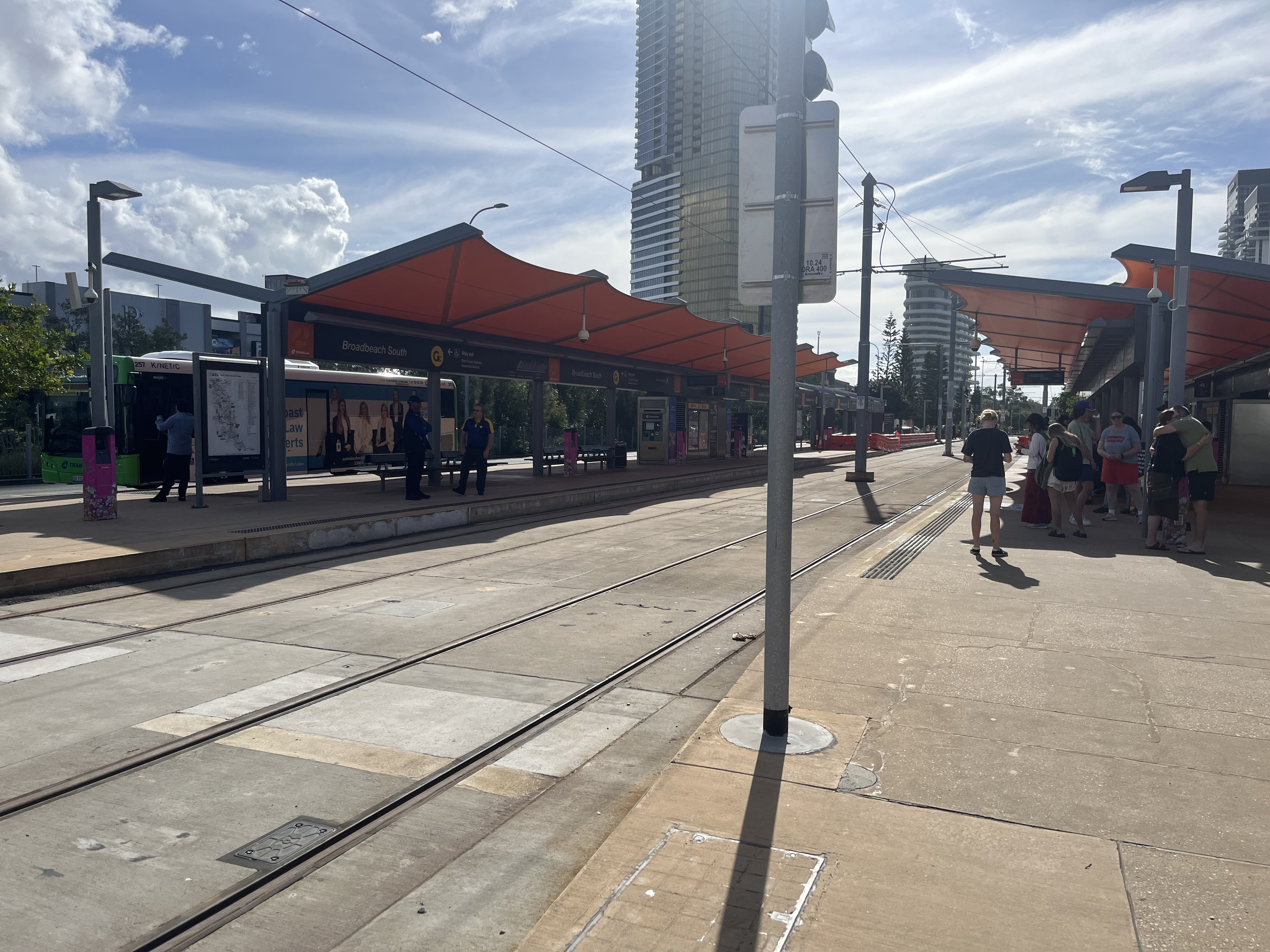
- Broadbeach South light rail station in June 2026

General information
- Location: Corner of Hooker Boulevard & Gold Coast Highway, Broadbeach
- Coordinates: 28°02′07″S 153°25′52″E
- Owner: GoldlinQ
- Operator: Keolis; Kinetic
- Line: L1
- Platforms: 2 (2 side)
- Tracks: 2
- Bus routes: 700 705 731 736 738 741 743 744 745 750 751 752 753 754 755 756
- Bus stands: 4

Construction
- Structure type: Ground
- Cycle facilities: Yes
- Accessible: Yes

Other information
- Station code: 600801 (platform 1); 600800 (platform 2); 319475 (bus stand A); 319476 (bus stand B); 319477 (bus stand C); 319478 (bus stand D)
- Website: Translink

History
- Opened: 20 July 2014; 12 years ago

Services
Preceding station	G:link	Following station
Broadbeach North towards Helensvale		Mermaid Beach towards Burleigh Heads
Bus services
Preceding station	Translink	Following station
Broadbeach North towards Helensvale	70 (Mon–Thu overnight)	Mermaid Beach towards Burleigh Heads
Pacific Fair towards Sea World	705	Terminus
Pacific Fair towards Southport	731	Terminus
Pacific Fair towards Nerang Bicentennial Centre	736	Terminus
Pacific Fair towards Griffith University	738	Terminus
Pacific Fair towards Southport	741	Terminus
Pacific Fair towards Nerang	743	Terminus
Pacific Fair towards Nerang	744	Terminus
Pacific Fair towards Nerang	745	Terminus
Terminus	750	Pacific Fair towards Robina
Terminus	751	Pacific Fair towards Robina
Terminus	752	Pacific Fair towards Robina Town Centre
Terminus	753	Pacific Fair towards Burleigh Heads
Terminus	754	Pacific Fair towards The Pines Elanora
Terminus	755	Pacific Fair towards Robina Town Centre
Terminus	756	Pacific Fair towards West Burleigh
Track layout
Location

Broadbeach South is a light rail station operated by Keolis Australia on the G:link light rail line. It opened in 2014 alongside the light rail system, serving the Gold Coast suburb of Broadbeach and the Pacific Fair shopping centre. It is a ground level station, featuring two side platforms and four bus stands. The station acted as the southern terminus of the light rail line from its opening until 9 August 2026, when the system was extended to Burleigh Heads.

Broadbeach South is a major transport hub for the Gold Coast, with a significant number of bus services terminating at the station. Kinetic operates shuttle bus services to the station from Carrara Stadium and Robina Stadium during major events.

== History ==
The suburb of Broadbeach was developed as an early residential suburb on the Gold Coast. Following the opening of Lennon's Broadbeach Hotel in December 1956, the area began to rapidly develop and became a tourist destination. The opening of Jupiter's Hotel and Casino (later known as The Star Gold Coast), Pacific Fair and the Oasis Shopping Centre in the late-20th century further developed Broadbeach as a tourist destination.

Prior to the introduction of light rail, the suburb of Broadbeach was only serviced by the Pacific Fair bus station and the Broadbeach Monorail, despite the area's popularity with tourists. In 1996, the Gold Coast City Council proposed building a light rail line to reduce congestion and improve public transport in the city. The 2004 draft summary report proposed a station named Hooker Boulevard, named after the adjacent street, at the future location of Broadbeach South station.

Prior to the construction of the G:link line, the site of the station was home to a Caltex petrol station and a small park. These were demolished prior to major construction of the line, which began in early 2012. The station and system opened on 20 July 2014, with Broadbeach South serving the southern terminus of the line and a major transport hub, as many services that previously terminated at Pacific Fair now terminated at the station.

In the 2018–19 financial year, Broadbeach South was the second-busiest station on the light rail line with 1.49 million boardings, including an average of 4,182 boardings on weekdays.

Beginning in March 2024, the station was partially demolished and reconstructed in preparation for the opening of the extension of the light rail to Burleigh Heads. All services departed from platform 2, with platform 1 being blocked by construction until the extension opened. Prior to this construction, services were able to be boarded from both platforms.

On 9 August 2026, the G:link line was extended beyond Broadbeach South to Burleigh Heads. Changes to bus timetables were introduced one month later, which resulted in route 777 terminating at Stockland Burleigh Heads instead of Broadbeach South, leaving bus platform B unused. Despite no longer being the southern light rail terminus, it remains a major transport hub.

=== Future proposals ===
Broadbeach South is expected to serve as the eastern terminus of the Nerang–Broadbeach route of the GC Surfer, a bus rapid transit system that is expected to be operational before the start of the Brisbane Olympics in July 2032.

The Crisafulli state government announced in August 2026 that a pedestrian overpass would be constructed over the Gold Coast Highway to provide direct access to Broadbeach South station.

== Platforms and services ==
Fifteen bus routes regularly stop at Broadbeach South station during the day. G:link services do not operate on Monday to Thursday mornings (from midnight until 4am) and are replaced by route 70, which runs along the entire light rail route from Helensvale to Burleigh Heads, stopping at Broadbeach South. Route 70 stops at platform A when travelling to Helensvale and platform C when travelling to Burleigh Heads.

Broadbeach South platform arrangement
Platform	Line/Route	Destination	Notes
1	L1	Helensvale	
2	L1	Burleigh Heads	
A	70	South	
B	Not in use; formerly served by bus route 777		
C	70 705 736 743 744 745 755	North and west	
D	731 738 741 750 751 752 753 754 756	North, south and west	
