= Hopo Ferry =

Ferry service on the Gold Coast, Australia

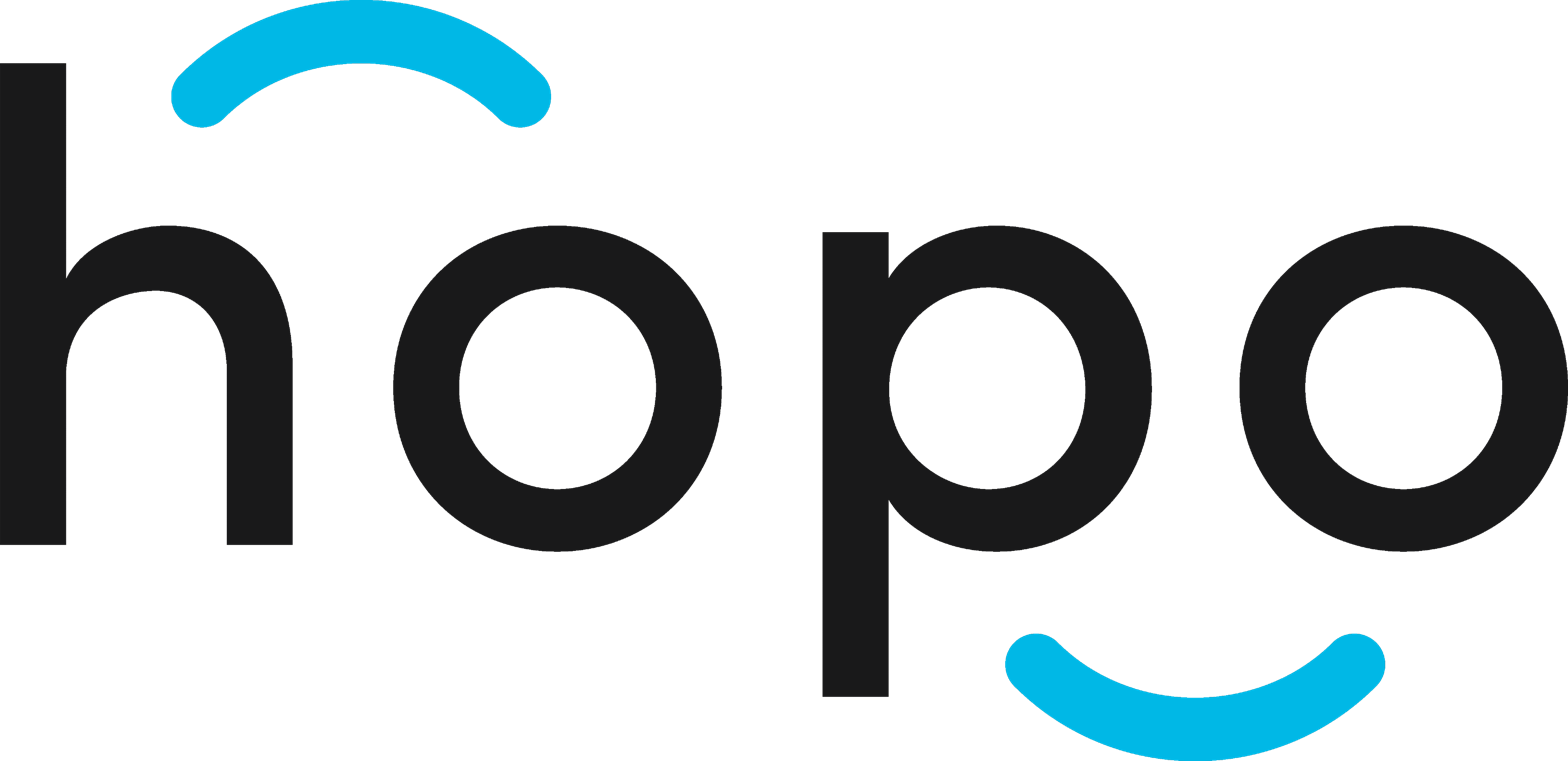

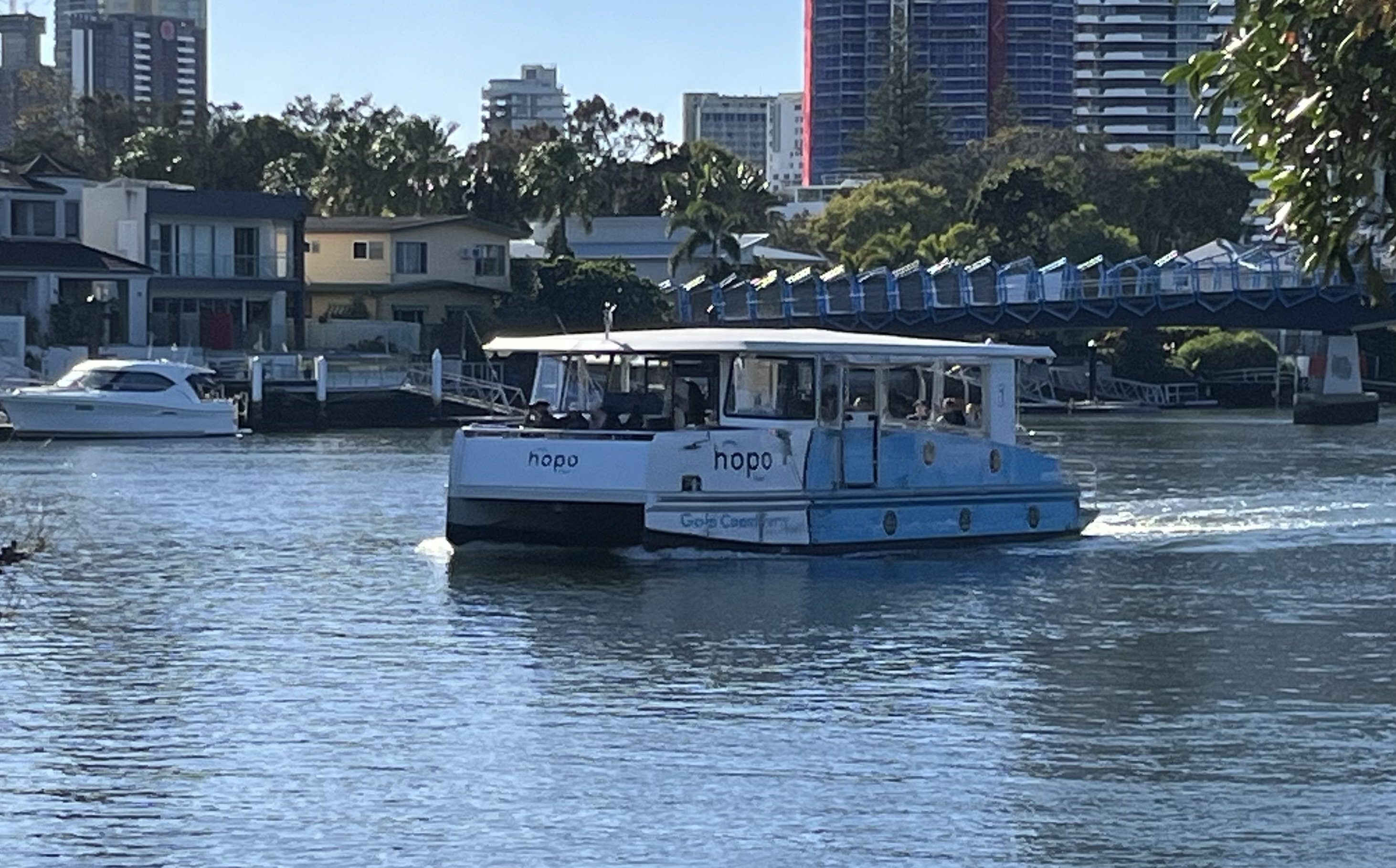
- Hopo Ferry 1 in June 2026
- Locale: Gold Coast, Australia
- Waterway: Nerang River, Gold Coast Seaway
- Transit type: Passenger ferry
- Operator: The Tour Collective
- Began operation: 8 December 2019; 6 years ago
- No. of vessels: 2
- No. of terminals: 5
- Website: hopo.com.au

Hopo is a ferry service on the Gold Coast in Queensland, Australia. Operated by The Tour Collective, the service runs between Sea World and Surfers Paradise, near Cavill Avenue. The service began in 2019 and is expected to continue until 2027, following a two-year trial.

== History ==
In 2004, then-Gold Coast mayor Ron Clarke proposed a Gold Coast ferry system, but it did not progress because of financial reasons.

In 2013, following the Gold Coast being announced as host of the 2018 Commonwealth Games, mayor Tom Tate proposed a ferry route running between Carrara Stadium and Runaway Bay.

Tate proposed another ferry system in July 2018, running between the Evandale Parklands and Labrador, with a potential expansion to Carrara Stadium. The Queensland Government announced support for this proposal in October 2018, with the Department of Transport and Main Roads partnering with the Gold Coast City Council for initial investigations.

In 2019, the Gold Coast City Council partnered with The Tour Collective, a newly-formed merger between Whales in Paradise, Dolphins in Paradise and Wyndham Cruises on a two year trial of ferry services between Cavill Avenue and Sea World. The service officially began operation on 8 December 2019.

The Tour Collective purchased two new ferries for A$1.2 million in August 2020, replacing the existing ferry on the route. In August 2022, the trial was extended for six months, before it was extended to five years in September of the same year, with the trial now expected to end in 2027.

When the service began, there was an express route was operated between Surfers Paradise and Home of the Arts daily between 7am and 10am. This service was discontinued on 7 December 2025, with only the all-stops service remaining.

== Network and operations ==
=== Fleet ===
Hopo operates two ferries, the Hopo 1 and Hopo 2. Both ferries are catamarans and were built on the Gold Coast in 2020.

=== Services ===
Hopo operate an all stops service between Sea World and Surfers Paradise. This service runs hourly, with northbound services leaving hourly from 9:15am to 4:15pm, and southbound services hourly from 10:10am to 5:10pm. The service is timetabled to take 55 minutes.

=== Wharves ===
Hopo services stop at five wharves, which are owned by the Gold Coast Waterways Authority.

Wharf	Image	Suburb	Facilities	Connections	Time (Note: Travel time in minutes from Surfers Paradise wharf.)
Surfers Paradise		Surfers Paradise	Ticket and information kiosk	Cavill Avenue light rail station Local bus stop	0
Home of the Arts		Surfers Paradise		Local bus stop	8
Marina Mirage		Main Beach		Local bus stop	35
Broadwater Parklands		Southport		Southport light rail station	45
Sea World		Main Beach	Ticket and information kiosk	Local bus stop Main Station (former)	55
