= Hope Island railway station =

Railway station in Queensland, Australia

Hope Island
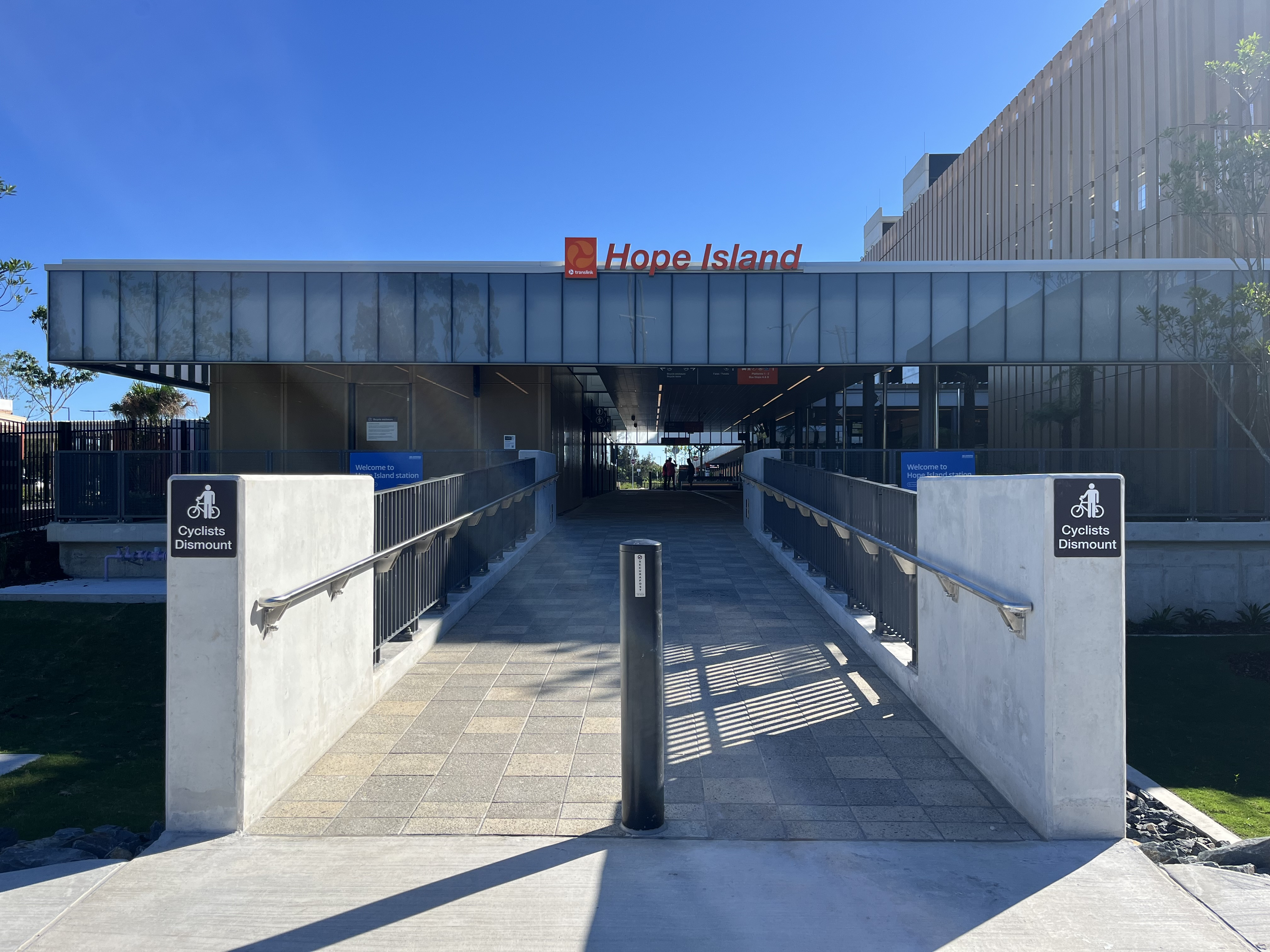
- Road entrance to Hope Island station in May 2026

General information
- Location: Hope Island Road, Helensvale
- Coordinates: 27.880°S 153.331°E
- Owner: Queensland Rail
- Operator: Queensland Rail
- Line: T5 Varsity Lakes
- Distance: 62.9 kilometres from Central
- Platforms: 2 (2 side)
- Tracks: 2

Construction
- Structure type: Elevated
- Platform levels: 1
- Parking: 179
- Cycle facilities: 40 spaces
- Accessible: yes

Other information
- Status: Complete
- Fare zone: Zone 4

History
- Opening: 18 May 2026; 3 months ago

Services
Preceding station	Queensland Rail	Following station
Coomera towards Domestic Airport via Roma Street	T5 Varsity Lakes line	Helensvale towards Varsity Lakes
Track layout
Location

Hope Island is a railway station operated by Queensland Rail on the Varsity Lakes line. It opened in 2026 and serves the Gold Coast suburbs of Hope Island and Helensvale. It is an elevated station, featuring two side platforms.

== History ==
The Gold Coast railway line opened in stages from 1996–2009. During its construction, provisions were made for a future station at Hope Island however due to low development in the area, the station was initially delayed. In November 2017, the Queensland Government committed to building three new in-fill stations on the Gold Coast Line as part of the AU$5.4 billion Cross River Rail project – Pimpama, Hope Island and Merrimac. In August 2021, Helensvale North station was renamed Hope Island as the result of community feedback.

It was anticipated that approximately 2,800 passengers would use Hope Island station per day. The station was expected to cost up to $40 million to construct, and was planned to be open in 2026. It was originally designed to open at the same time as Cross River Rail, but has since been uncoupled from that project.

The station opened on 18 May 2026.

The location for the station is off Hope Island Road, near Mangrove Jack Park and just south of the Coomera River. The station is integrated with other modes of public transport, and has connections with pedestrian and bicycle paths. The station concept design had included space for 174 car park bays.

== Platforms and services ==
Hope Island platform arrangement
Platform	Line	Destination	Notes
1	T5 Varsity Lakes	Varsity Lakes	
2	T5 Varsity Lakes	Roma Street (to Brisbane Airport line)	
