= Burleigh Heads light rail station =

Light rail station in Queensland, Australia

Burleigh Heads
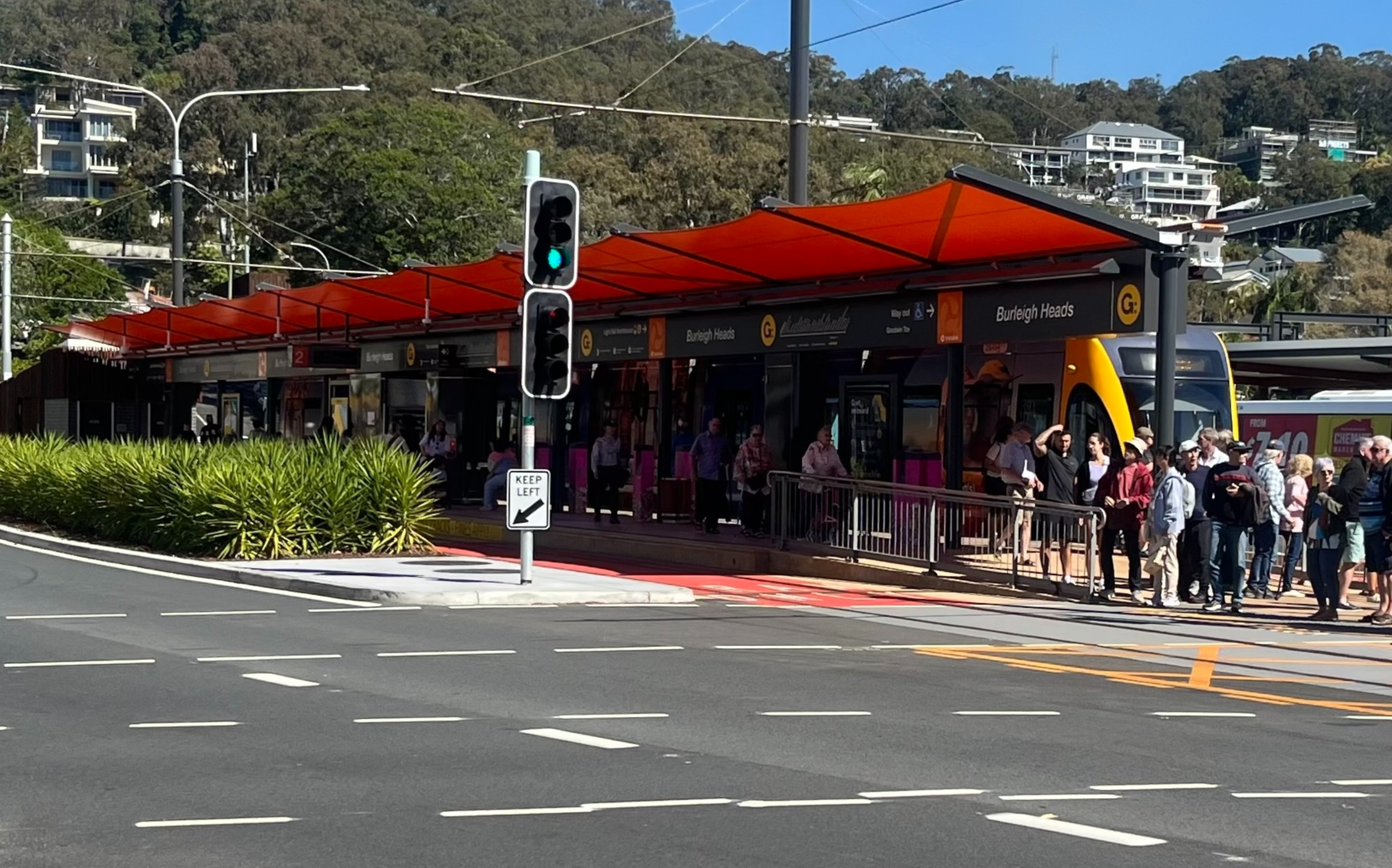
- Burleigh Heads light rail station in August 2026

General information
- Location: Gold Coast Highway, Burleigh Heads
- Coordinates: 28°05′24″S 153°27′10″E
- Owner: GoldlinQ
- Operator: Keolis; Kinetic
- Line: L1
- Platforms: 2 (1 island)
- Tracks: 2
- Bus routes: 70 700 701 753 754 757 777
- Bus stands: 2

Construction
- Structure type: Ground level
- Cycle facilities: Yes
- Accessible: Yes

Other information
- Station code: 600877 (platform 1); 600878 (platform 2); 321299 (bus stop A); 300018 (bus stop B)
- Website: Translink

History
- Opened: 9 August 2026; 33 days ago

Services
Preceding station	G:link	Following station
Second Avenue Burleigh towards Helensvale		Terminus
Bus services
Preceding station	Translink	Following station
Second Avenue Burleigh towards Helensvale	70 (Mon–Thu overnight)	Terminus
Stockland Burleigh Heads Terminus	700	Tweed Street towards Tweed Heads
Tweed Street towards Robina	701	West Burleigh Road towards The Pines Elanora
West Burleigh Road towards Broadbeach South	753	Terminus
Stockland Burleigh Heads towards Broadbeach South	754	Tweed Street towards The Pines Elanora
Stockland Burleigh Heads towards Reedy Creek	757	Terminus
Stockland Burleigh Heads Terminus	777	Twenty Seventh Ave towards Gold Coast Airport
Track layout
Location

Burleigh Heads is a light rail station operated by Keolis Australia on the G:link light rail line. It opened in 2026 with the extension of the light rail from Broadbeach South, serving the Gold Coast suburb of Burleigh Heads. It is a ground level station, featuring one island platform and two bus stands. The station is the southern terminus of the light rail line.

Burleigh Heads is a major transport hub for the southern Gold Coast, with a significant number of bus services terminating at the station.

== History ==
In November 2015, the Department of Transport and Main Roads published a map showing a future extension of the light rail line to Burleigh Heads. In mid-2017, the Gold Coast City Council undertook community consultation on the extension, which was known as Stage 3A (later Stage 3). The preliminary business case was provided to the Queensland Government in February 2018 and planning began two months later.

The Queensland Government undertook consultation with Burleigh Heads residents in mid-2018. As part of this, the proposed site of the light rail station – located adjacent to the Burleigh Heads Bowls Club – was identified.

Prior to the construction of the light rail station, the site was home to a Caltex petrol station. This was demolished in August 2020 prior to major construction of the light rail.

Burleigh Heads station opened on 9 August 2026. Changes to bus timetables were introduced one month later, which resulted in two bus routes – 764 and 765 – no longer operating at the station.

=== Future proposals ===
The station was not planned to be the long-term southern terminus of the light rail line, with the Stage 4 extension proposing an extension of the line to Coolangatta. As part of this, the suburb of Burleigh Heads would be served by a third light rail station – known as Tallebudgera Creek – which would be located near the entrance of the Burleigh Head National Park. Stage 4 was cancelled by the Crisafulli state government in September 2025.

Burleigh Heads station will become part of the Robina–Coolangatta route of the GC Surfer, a bus rapid transit system announced to replace Stage 4 that is expected to be operational before the start of the Brisbane Olympics in July 2032.

== Platforms and services ==
Six bus routes regularly stop at Burleigh Heads station during the day. G:link services do not operate on Monday to Thursday mornings (from midnight until 4am) and are replaced by route 70, which runs along the entire light rail route from Burleigh Heads to Helensvale.

Burleigh Heads platform arrangement
Platform	Line/Route	Destination	Notes
1	L1	Helensvale	
2	L1	Terminating services	
A	70 700 701 753 754 757 777	North and west	
B	70 700 701 753 754 757 777	East and south	
