= Coomera railway station =

Railway station on the Gold Coast railway line

Coomera
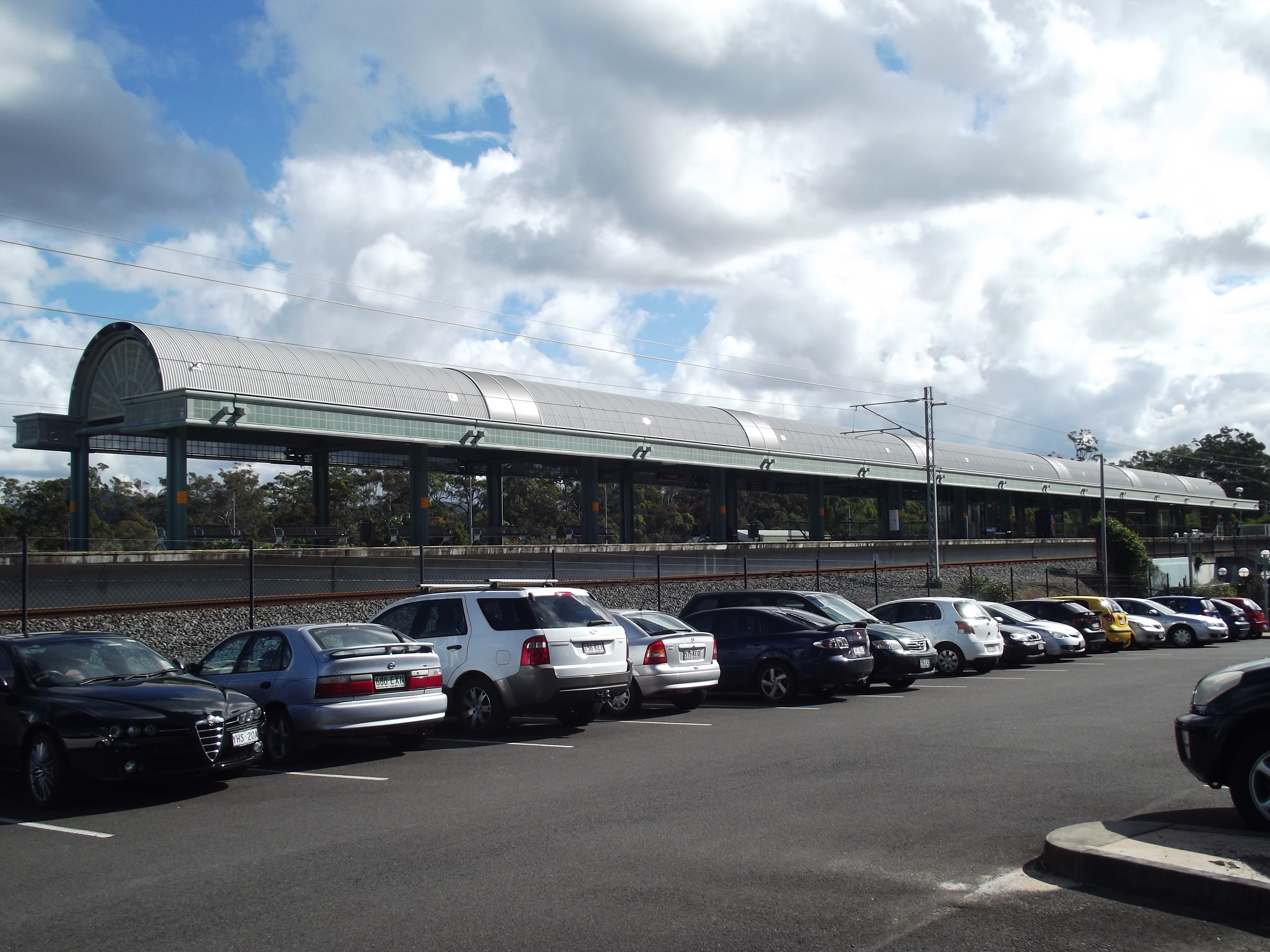
- Northbound view in July 2012

General information
- Location: Foxwell Road, Coomera
- Coordinates: 27°51′09″S 153°19′01″E
- Owner: Queensland Rail
- Operator: Queensland Rail
- Line: T5 Varsity Lakes
- Distance: 59.59 kilometres from Central
- Platforms: 2 (1 island)
- Tracks: 2

Construction
- Structure type: Ground
- Cycle facilities: Yes
- Accessible: Yes

Other information
- Status: Staffed
- Station code: 600243 (platform 1); 600244 (platform 2)
- Fare zone: Zone 4
- Website: Queensland Rail

History
- Opened: 25 February 1996

Services
Preceding station	Queensland Rail	Following station
Pimpama towards Domestic Airport via Roma Street	T5 Varsity Lakes line	Hope Island towards Varsity Lakes
Track layout
Location

Coomera is a railway station operated by Queensland Rail on the Varsity Lakes line. It opened on 25 February 1996 and serves the Gold Coast suburb of Coomera. It is a ground level station, featuring an island platform with two faces.

== History ==
Coomera station opened on 25 February 1996 when the Gold Coast line opened from Beenleigh to Helensvale. A track duplication to the south of the station, linking with Helensvale, was completed in October 2017. The new track provides additional capacity in time for the 2018 Commonwealth Games. The duplication required the construction of 8 new rail bridges, including one with a span of 860 metres across the Coomera River, Hope Island Road and Saltwater Creek.

== Services ==
Coomera is served by Gold Coast line services from Varsity Lakes to Bowen Hills, Doomben and Brisbane Domestic Airport.

== Platforms and services ==
Coomera platform arrangement
Platform	Line	Destination	Notes
1	T5 Varsity Lakes	Varsity Lakes	
2	T5 Varsity Lakes	Roma Street (to Brisbane Airport line)	

== Transport links ==
Kinetic Gold Coast operate seven bus routes from Coomera station:

- TX7: (formerly 720) to Helensvale station via Dreamworld, Movie World & Wet n Wild
- 720: to Ormeau Station via Pimpama Sports Hub
- 721: to Pimpama City via Upper Coomera and Pimpama Station
- 722: to Pimpama station via Pimpama
- 723: to Helensvale station via Oxenford
- 724: to Pimpama Sports Hub via Pimpama City and Pimpama Station
- 725: to Helensvale station via Upper Coomera
- 726: to Coomera Waters
- 727: to Helensvale station via Reserve Road
- 732: to Pimpama City via Gainsborough Drive and Pimpama Station
