= Pacific Fair bus station =

Bus station in Queensland, Australia

Pacific Fair
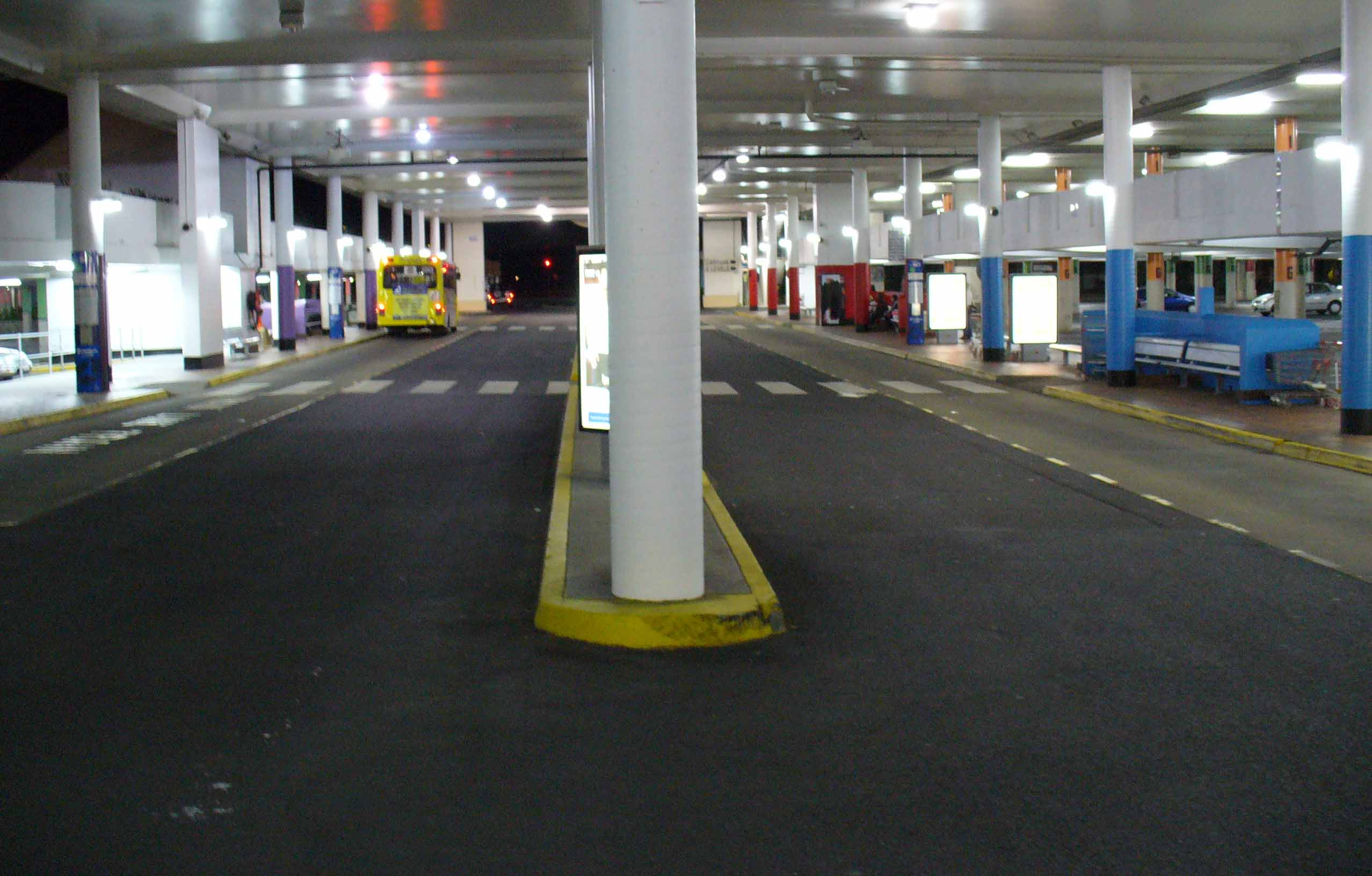

General information
- Location: Hooker Boulevard, Broadbeach
- Coordinates: 28°02′8.83″S 153°25′35.40″E
- Bus routes: 15
- Bus stands: 2

Construction
- Accessible: Yes
Location

Pacific Fair is a bus station operated by Translink. It is part of the Pacific Fair shopping centre and is close to Broadbeach Library, The Star Gold Coast and the Gold Coast Convention & Exhibition Centre.

Until the G:link light rail network opened in July 2014, it was the terminating point for number of services, these have now been extended to Broadbeach South light rail station.
