= Palaszczuk Ministry =

Palaszczuk Ministry may refer to the following governments of Queensland:

- First Palaszczuk Ministry, 2015–2017
- Second Palaszczuk Ministry, 2017–2020
- Third Palaszczuk Ministry, from 2020
