= Helensvale railway station =

Railway station in Queensland, Australia

Helensvale
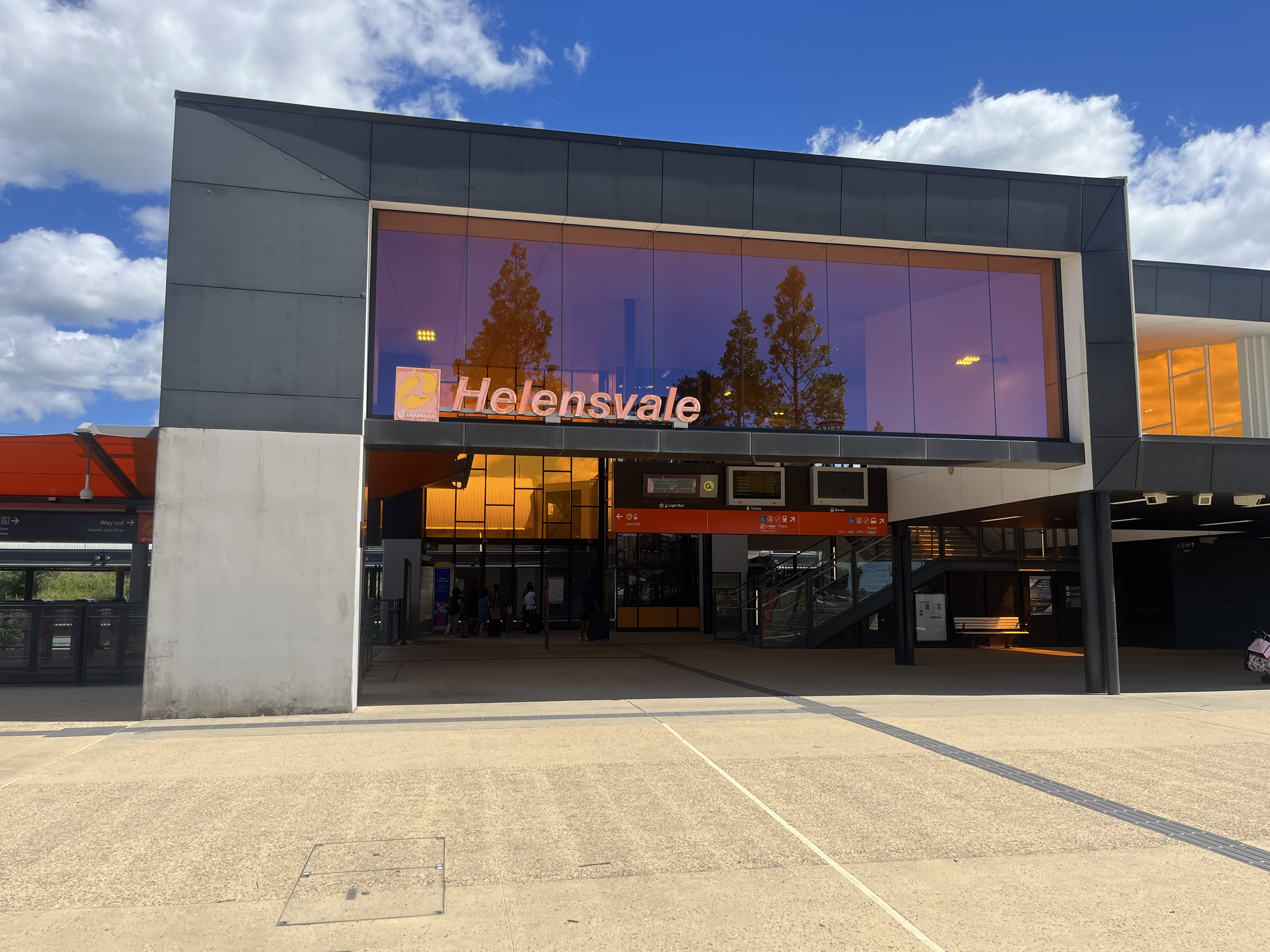
- Eastern entrance in March 2026

General information
- Location: Town Centre Drive, Helensvale
- Coordinates: 27°55′31″S 153°20′20″E
- Owner: Queensland Rail; GoldlinQ
- Operator: Queensland Rail; Keolis
- Line: T5 Varsity Lakes G:link
- Distance: 68.26 kilometres from Central
- Platforms: 4 (2 islands)
- Tracks: 4
- Bus routes: 704, 709, 710, 714, 715, 716, 717, 718, 723, 727, TX7
- Bus stands: 7

Construction
- Structure type: At-grade
- Parking: 400 spaces
- Cycle facilities: Yes
- Accessible: Yes

Other information
- Status: Staffed
- Station code: 600119 (platform 1); 600245 (platform 2); 600837 (platform 4); 600836 (platform 5)
- Fare zone: Zone 5
- Website: Queensland Rail

History
- Opened: 25 February 1996

Passengers
- 2022–23: 788,335 (rail)
- Rank: 5

Services
Preceding station	Queensland Rail	Following station
Hope Island towards Domestic Airport	Varsity Lakes line	Nerang towards Varsity Lakes

Light rail services
Preceding station	G:link	Following station
Terminus	L1	Parkwood towards Burleigh Heads
Track layout
Location

Helensvale is a railway station operated by Queensland Rail on the Varsity Lakes line. It opened on 16 December 1997 and serves the Gold Coast suburb of Helensvale. It is a ground level station, featuring two island platforms with four faces.

Since December 2017, Helensvale has served as the northern terminus of the G:link light rail system.

== History ==
The original Helensvale railway station opened with the South Coast railway line in January 1889. For most of its history, it was located between Oxenford station and Ernest Junction station (although Coombabah station was located before Ernest Junction until May 1891). Helensvale closed in June 1964 along with the rest of the South Coast line.

On 25 February 1996, the Gold Coast railway line opened with three newly-constructed stations, including Helensvale. It served as the line's terminus until 16 December 1997, when Nerang station opened. When opened, Helensvale station was also served by a CountryLink road coach service from Murwillumbah, this was diverted when the line was extended south.

A track duplication to the north of the station, linking with Coomera, was completed in October 2017. The new track provides additional capacity in time for the 2018 Commonwealth Games. The duplication required the construction of eight new rail bridges, including one with a span of 860 metres across the Coomera River, Hope Island Road and Saltwater Creek.

On 18 December 2017, Helensvale became the northern terminus of the G:link light rail line with two additional platforms opening.

On 9 August 2026, light rail services from Helensvale were extended from Broadbeach South to Burleigh Heads.

== Platforms and services ==
Helensvale platform arrangement
Platform	Line	Destination	Notes
1	T5 Varsity Lakes	Varsity Lakes	
2	T5 Varsity Lakes	Roma Street (to Brisbane Airport line)	
4	G:link	Burleigh Heads	
5	G:link	Burleigh Heads	

== Bus connections ==
Kinetic Gold Coast operate eleven bus routes from Helensvale station:

- 704: to Sea World via Southport and Main Beach
- 710: to Griffith University via Parkwood
- 714: to Griffith University via Pacific Pines
- 715: to Southport via Arundel
- 716: to Studio Village
- 717: to Pacific Pines
- 718: to Santa Barbara
- TX7 (formerly 720): to Coomera station via Dreamworld, Movie World & Wet n Wild
- 723: to Coomera station via Oxenford
- 725: to Coomera station via Upper Coomera
- 727: to Coomera station via Reserve Road

The Tamborine Mountain demand responsive transport also runs from here.
