= Nerang railway station =

Railway station in Queensland, Australia

Nerang
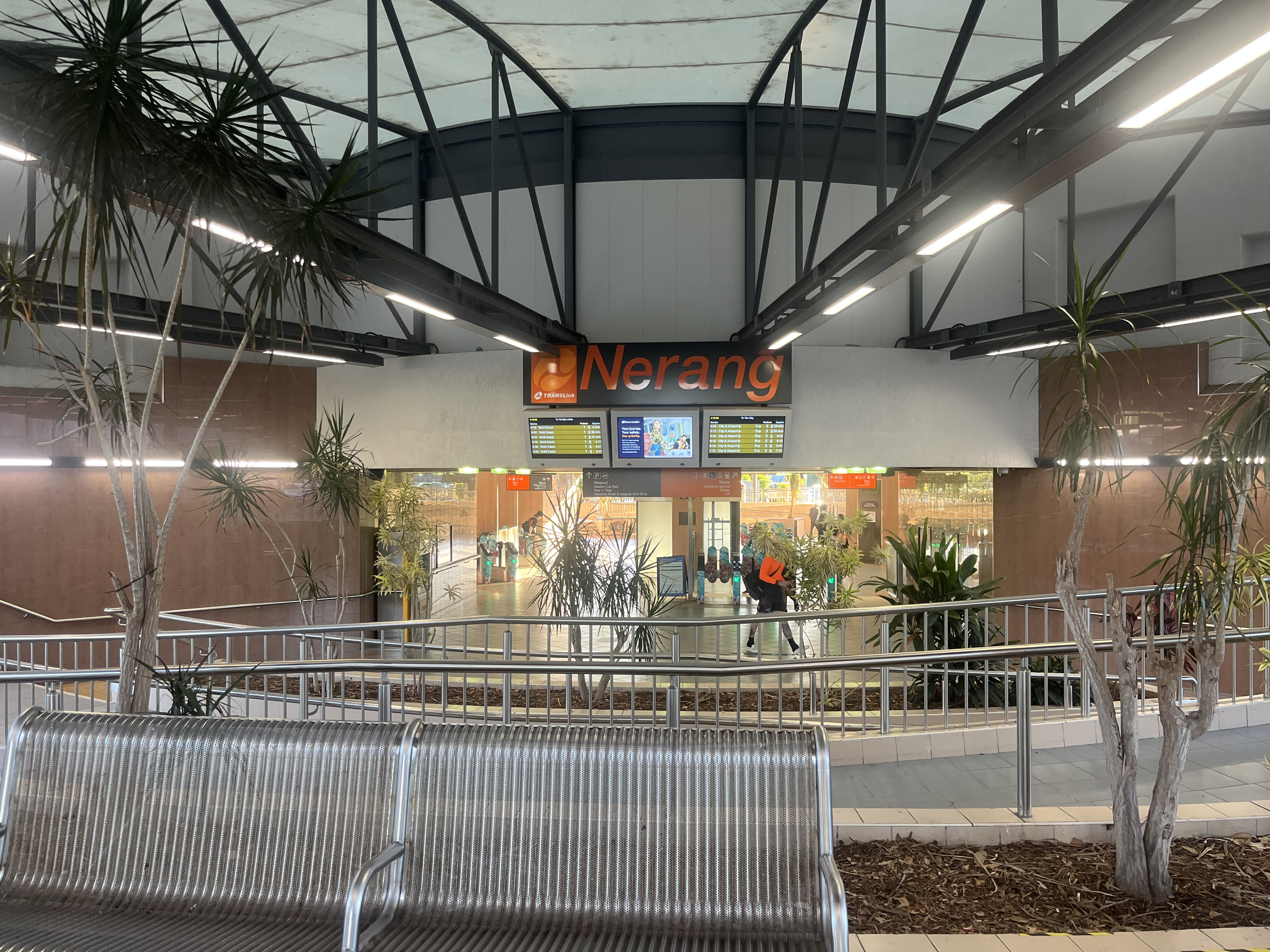
- Station entrance in June 2026

General information
- Location: Leagues Club Drive, Nerang
- Coordinates: 27°59′39″S 153°21′00″E
- Owner: Queensland Rail
- Operator: Queensland Rail
- Line: T5 Varsity Lakes
- Distance: 75.89 kilometres from Central
- Platforms: 2 (1 island)
- Tracks: 2

Construction
- Structure type: Ground
- Cycle facilities: Yes
- Accessible: Yes

Other information
- Status: Staffed
- Station code: 600185 (platform 1); 600120 (platform 2)
- Fare zone: Zone 5
- Website: Queensland Rail

History
- Opened: 16 December 1997; 28 years ago

Services
Preceding station	Queensland Rail	Following station
Helensvale towards Domestic Airport via Roma Street	T5 Varsity Lakes line	Robina towards Varsity Lakes
Track layout
Location

Nerang is a railway station operated by Queensland Rail on the Varsity Lakes line. It opened in 1997 and serves the Gold Coast suburb of Nerang. It is an elevated station, featuring an island platform with two faces.

== History ==
Nerang station opened on 16 December 1997 when the Gold Coast line was extended from Helensvale. It served as the terminus until the line was extended in 1998 to Robina.

== Platforms and services ==
Nerang platform arrangement
Platform	Line	Destination	Notes
1	T5 Varsity Lakes	Varsity Lakes	
2	T5 Varsity Lakes	Roma Street (to Brisbane Airport line)	

== Transport links ==
Kinetic Gold Coast operate eight bus routes from Nerang station:

- 735: to Southport bus station
- 739: to Griffith University
- 740: to Surfers Paradise
- 743: to Broadbeach South Interchange via Pappas Way
- 744: to Broadbeach South Interchange via Highland Park
- 745: to Broadbeach South Interchange via Carrara
- 746: to Yarrimbah Drive
- 748: to Robina Town Centre
- 749: to Dugandan Street
