= Robina railway station =

Railway station in Queensland, Australia

Robina
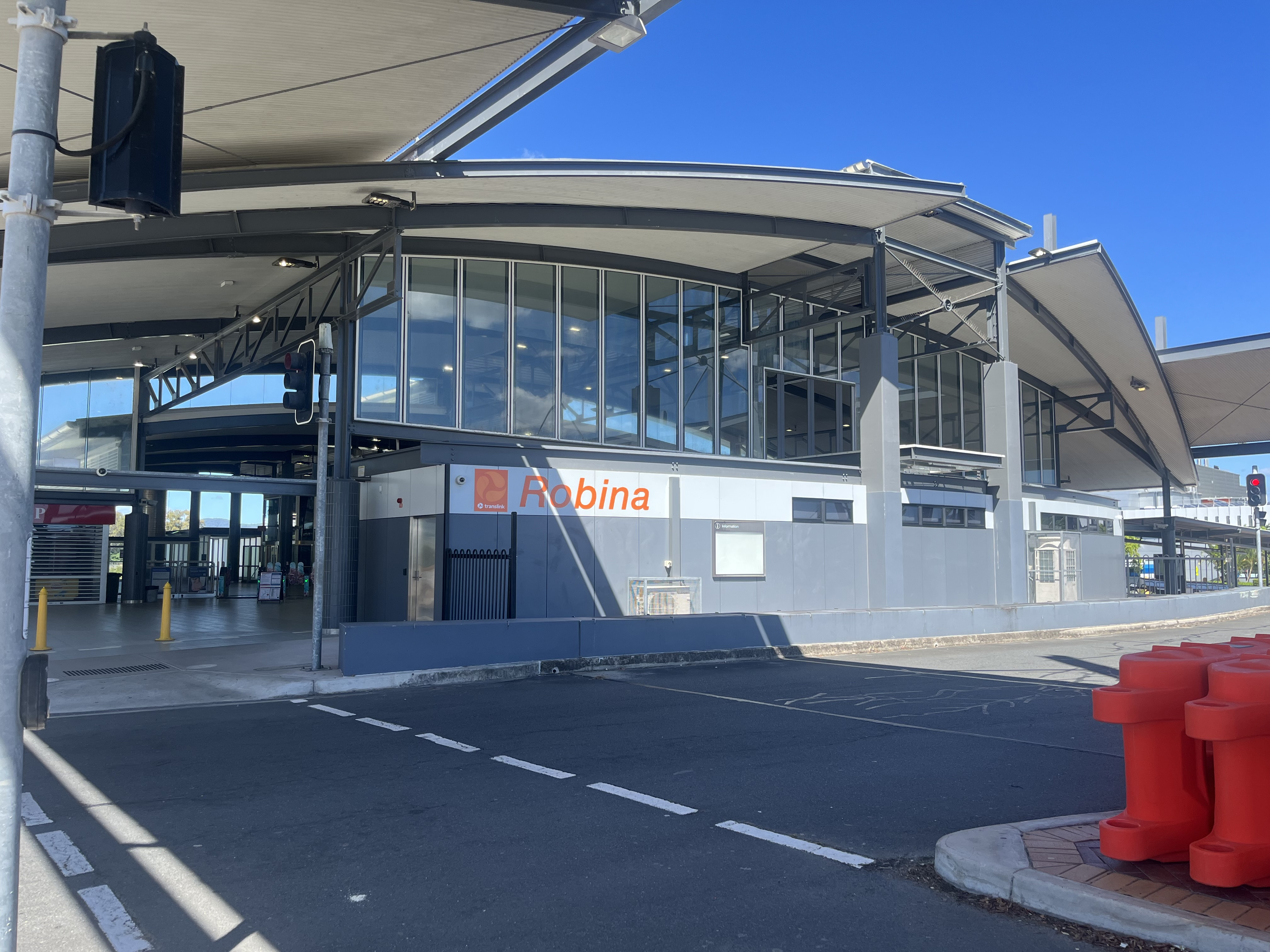
- Station front in March 2026

General information
- Location: Bayberry Lane, Robina, Queensland
- Coordinates: 28°04′16″S 153°22′40″E
- Owner: Queensland Rail
- Operator: Queensland Rail
- Line: T5 Varsity Lakes
- Distance: 85.35 kilometres from Central
- Platforms: 2 (1 island)
- Tracks: 2

Construction
- Structure type: Ground
- Cycle facilities: Yes
- Accessible: Yes

Other information
- Status: Staffed
- Station code: 600118 (platform 1); 600246 (platform 2)
- Fare zone: Zone 5
- Website: Queensland Rail

History
- Opened: 31 May 1998; 28 years ago

Services
Preceding station	Queensland Rail	Following station
Nerang towards Domestic Airport	Varsity Lakes line	Varsity Lakes Terminus
Track layout
Location

Robina is a railway station operated by Queensland Rail on the Varsity Lakes line. It opened in 1998 and serves the Gold Coast suburb of Robina. It is a ground level station, featuring an island platform with two faces.

== History ==
Robina station opened on 31 May 1998 when the Gold Coast line was extended from Nerang. It served at the terminus of the line until it was extended to Varsity Lakes in December 2009.

North of the station lies a stabling yard, which was expanded as part of the New Generation Rollingstock project.

== Services ==
Robina is served by Gold Coast line services from Varsity Lakes to Bowen Hills, Doomben and Brisbane Airport Domestic.

== Platforms and services ==
Robina platform arrangement
Platform	Line	Destination	Notes
1	T5 Varsity Lakes	Varsity Lakes	
2	T5 Varsity Lakes	Roma Street (to Brisbane Airport line)	

== Transport links ==
Kinetic Gold Coast operates eight bus routes via Robina station:

- 747: to Southport bus station
- 750: to Broadbeach South Interchange via Bond University
- 751: to Broadbeach South Interchange via Mermaid Waters
- 752: Robina Town Centre to Broadbeach South Interchange via Robina and Mermaid Waters
- 755: Robina Town Centre bus station to Broadbeach South Interchange via Merrimac
- 758: Robina Town Centre to Merrimac via Mudgeeraba
- 759: to Reedy Creek
- 760: to Tweed Heads via Gold Coast Airport

NSW TrainLink operates a coach service to Casino that connects with an XPT service to Sydney.
