= The Pines Elanora =

Shopping centre in Elanora, Queensland

- Location: Elanora, Queensland
- Coordinates: 28.133886°S 153.467859°E
- Address: Cnr Guineas Creek Road & KP McGrath Drive
- Opened: 9 March 1987; 39 years ago
- Num. of stores: 93
- Num. of anchor tenants: 4
- Floors: 1
- Parking: 1,500 spaces
- Website: thepineselanora.com.au

The Pines Elanora is a major shopping centre located in the Gold Coast suburb of Elanora. It includes more than 90 stores and retail services.

It is the only shopping centre on the southern Gold Coast that contains all three major supermarkets (Woolworths, Coles and Aldi); Kmart also serves as a fourth anchor tenant.

== History ==
The Pines opened on 9 March 1987. It has been featured in several film and television productions, including Muriel's Wedding in 1994, Mortified between 2006 and 2007, and San Andreas in 2015, when it was renamed "Bakersfield Mall".

In January 2015, redevelopment of The Pines began at a cost of A$30 million. As part of the redevelopment, the largest solar car park in Australia was installed, along with nearly twenty new stories and a relocated Woolworths. It was completed in 2016. Around the time of the redevelopment, The Pines had a 15.4% increase in retail sales.

== Bus station ==
The Pines Shopping Centre is a bus station operated by Translink that serves The Pines. It is a ground level station, featuring two side platforms with two bus stands each.

In September 2017, construction began for the relocation of the bus station. The work was completed in November 2017, making it adjacent to the car park facility along KP McGrath Drive.
