= Varsity Lakes railway station =

Railway station in Queensland, Australia

Varsity Lakes
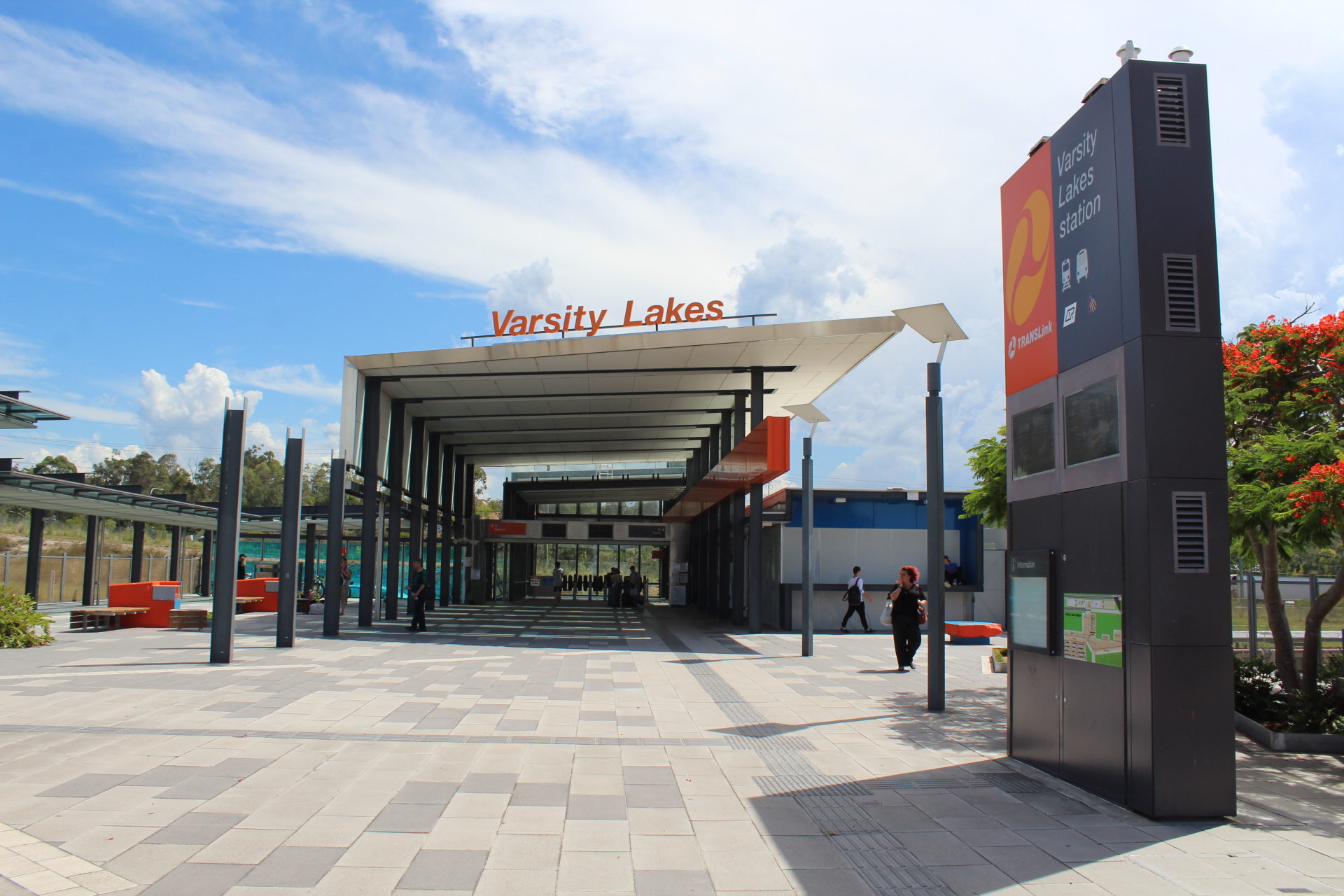
- Station entrance in December 2016

General information
- Location: Scottsdale Drive & Cormandel Lane, Varsity Lakes
- Coordinates: 28°05′49″S 153°23′58″E
- Owner: Queensland Rail
- Operator: Queensland Rail
- Line: T5 Varsity Lakes
- Distance: 89.40 kilometres from Central
- Platforms: 2 (1 island)
- Tracks: 2

Construction
- Structure type: Ground
- Cycle facilities: Yes
- Accessible: Yes

Other information
- Status: Staffed
- Station code: 600247 (platform 1); 600117 (platform 2)
- Fare zone: Zone 6
- Website: Queensland Rail

History
- Opened: 13 December 2009; 16 years ago

Services
| Preceding station | Queensland Rail | Following station |
|---|---|---|
| Robina towards Domestic Airport | Varsity Lakes line | Terminus |
Track layout
Location

Varsity Lakes is a railway station operated by Queensland Rail, which serves as the terminus of the Varsity Lakes line. It opened in 2009 and serves the Gold Coast suburb of Varsity Lakes. It is a ground level station, featuring an island platform with two faces.

== History ==
Varsity Lakes station opened on 13 December 2009 as the terminal station of the Gold Coast line when it was extended from Robina.

Construction work on the four kilometre line extension from Robina commenced in late July 2007.

== Services ==
Varsity Lakes is the terminus station for Gold Coast line services to and from Bowen Hills, Doomben and Brisbane Airport Domestic.

== Platforms and services ==
Varsity Lakes platform arrangement
| Platform | Line | Destination | Notes |
|---|---|---|---|
| 1 | T5 Varsity Lakes | Roma Street (to Brisbane Airport line) | |
| 2 | T5 Varsity Lakes | Roma Street (to Brisbane Airport line) | |

== Transport links ==
Kinetic Gold Coast operate five bus routes via Varsity Lakes station:

- 753: Burleigh Heads to Broadbeach South Interchange
- 757: Burleigh Heads to Reedy Creek
- 759: Robina station to Reedy Creek
- 760: Robina station to Tweed Heads via Gold Coast Airport
- 765: The Pines Elanora to Robina Town Centre via Christine Avenue
