= Arundel, Queensland =

Arundel Gold Coast, Queensland
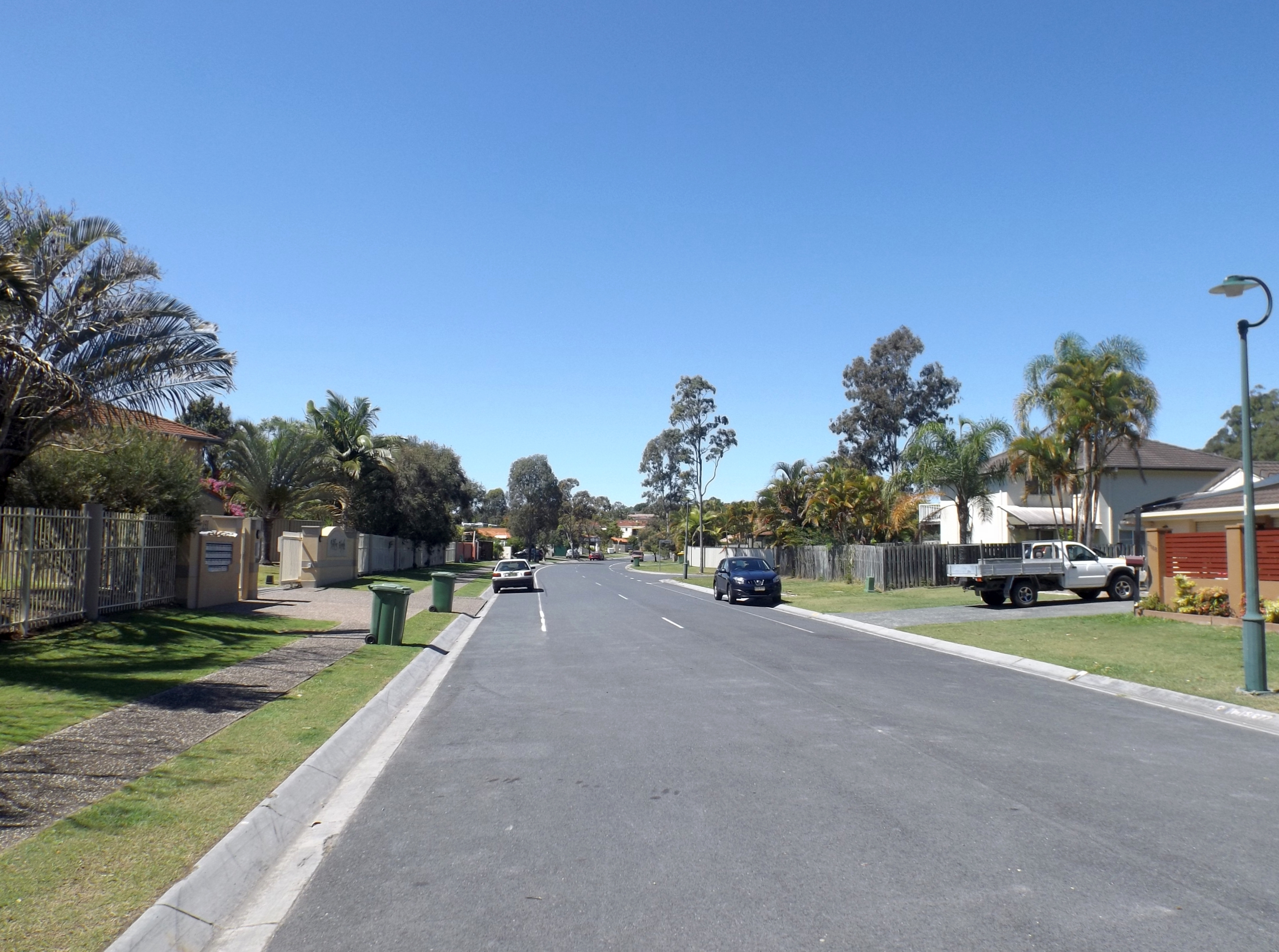
- Greenacre Drive, 2015

- Coordinates: 27.9386°S 153.3638°E
- Population: 11,171 (2021 census)
  - Density: 1,085/km^{2} (2,809/sq mi)
- Postcode(s): 4214
- Area: 10.3 km^{2} (4.0 sq mi)
- Time zone: AEST (UTC+10:00)
- Location: 8.2 km (5 mi) NW of Southport; 12.1 km (8 mi) NNW of Surfers Paradise; 66.9 km (42 mi) SSW of Brisbane
- LGA(s): City of Gold Coast
- State electorate(s): Bonney
- Federal division(s): Fadden
Suburbs around Arundel:
Helensvale	Coombabah	Biggera Waters
Gaven	Arundel	Labrador
Molendinar	Parkwood	Southport

Arundel (/əˈrʌndəl/ ə-RUN-dəl) is a suburb in the City of Gold Coast, Queensland, Australia. In the 2021 census, Arundel had a population of 11,171 people.

== Geography ==
Located in the suburb is the Coombabah Lake Conservation Park, bordered by Coombabah Creek and adjacent to the Ivan Gibbs Wetlands Reserve in Coombabah. The Biggera Creek Dam is located in Arundel, for the purpose of flood mitigation.

== History ==
Arundel was officially named and bounded as a suburb on 16 September 1989 and has since grown into a series of housing estates.

A.B. Paterson College opened on 1 January 1991. In 2021, A.B. Paterson College celebrated its 30th anniversary.

Arundel State School opened on 1 January 1994.

== Demographics ==
In the 2011 census, Arundel recorded a population of 9,575 people, 51.7% female and 48.3% male. The median age of the Arundel population was 36 years, 1 year below the national median of 37. 60.9% of people living in Arundel were born in Australia. The other top responses for country of birth were New Zealand 9.7%, England 5.5%, China 1.3%, South Africa 1.2%, Korea, Republic of 1.2%. 80% of people spoke only English at home; the next most common languages were 1.6% Korean, 1.5% Mandarin, 1.2% Japanese, 0.8% Cantonese, 0.5% Greek.

In the 2016 census, Arundel had a population of 10,246 people, 51.7% female and 48.3% male. The median age of the Arundel population was 40 years, 2 years above the national median of 38. 58.8% of people living in Arundel were born in Australia. The other top responses for country of birth were New Zealand 9.9%, England 5.4%, China (excludes SARs and Taiwan) 2.5%, South Africa 1.3% and Philippines 1.0%. 77.3% of people only spoke English at home; the next most common languages were 3.2% Mandarin, 1.3% Japanese, 1.2% Korean, 0.9% Cantonese and 0.6% Bosnian.

In the 2021 census, Arundel recorded a population of 11,171 people, 51.2% female and 48.8% male. The median age of the Arundel population was 41 years, 3 years above the national median of 38. 59.5% of people living in Arundel were born in Australia. The other top responses for country of birth were New Zealand 8%, England 5.3%, China 3.1%, India 1.9%, Philippines 1.5%. 74.9% of people spoke only English at home; the next most common languages were 3.9% Mandarin, 1.4% Japanese, 0.9% Korean, 0.8% Cantonese, 0.7% Arabic.

== Heritage listings ==
There are a number of heritage-listed sites in Arundel, including:

- 120 - 124 Allied Drive: former Burleigh Police Station, former Tallebudgera Police Station, Nui Dat House

== Education ==
Arundel State School is a government primary (Prep-6) school for boys and girls on the corner of Napper Road and Arundel Drive (27.9450°S 153.3658°E). In 2022, the school had an enrolment of 1066 students with 78 teachers (71 full-time equivalent) and 41 non-teaching staff (28.2 full-time equivalent). It includes a special education program.

A.B. Paterson College is a private primary and secondary (Prep-12) school for boys and girls at 10 A B Paterson Drive (27.9276°S 153.3603°E). In 2023, the school had an enrolment of 1,607 students with 119 teachers and 79 non-teaching staff.

There are no government secondary schools in Arundel. The nearest government secondary schools are Coombabah State High School in neighbouring Coombabah to the north, Southport State High School in neighbouring Southport to the south-east, and Pacific Pines State High School in Pacific Pines to the west.

== Amenities ==
Situated within the suburb was the Arundel Hills Country Club, which has its own golf course. As of 24 May 2022, the country club has closed.

Other major facilities are located in adjacent suburbs, including Helensvale railway station and Westfield Helensvale (Helensvale), Harbour Town Shopping Centre (Biggera Waters) and Griffith University, Gold Coast University Hospital and the G:link light rail service. Arundel's primary local shopping precinct is Arundel Plaza, located on the corner of Napper Road and Daintree Drive. The center is anchored by a Coles supermarket and includes various specialty stores, medical services, and dining options. A major residential community, Arundel Springs, has also been developed which integrates with the surrounding natural environment, backing onto the Coombabah Wetlands.

== Sport ==
The Mike Hatcher Raceway (formerly the Gold Coast Speedway) is a motorcycle speedway and motocross venue on Kendor Street, off Captain Cook Drive (lot 10). The track has held significant events in the past, including the final of the Australian Solo Championship in 2004 and the Queensland Solo Championship six times, from 2000 to 2008.

== See also ==
- List of Gold Coast suburbs
