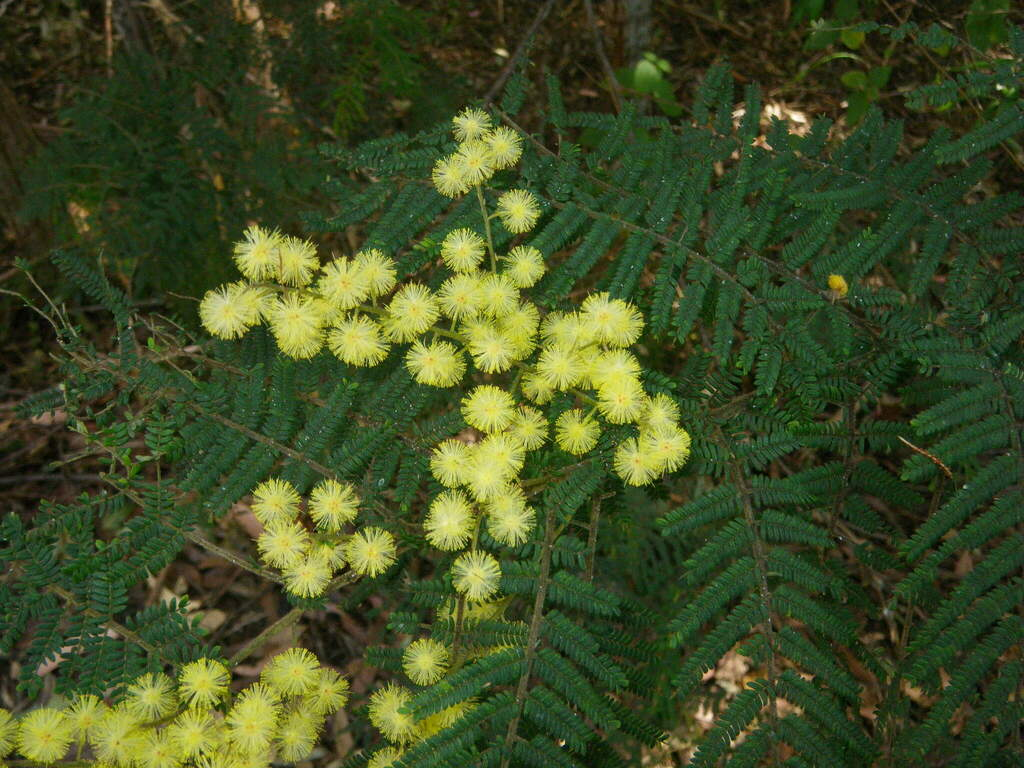

Conservation status
- Endangered (IUCN 3.1)

Scientific classification
- Kingdom: Plantae
- Clade: Tracheophytes
- Clade: Angiosperms
- Clade: Eudicots
- Clade: Rosids
- Order: Fabales
- Family: Fabaceae
- Subfamily: Caesalpinioideae
- Clade: Mimosoid clade
- Genus: Acacia
- Species: A. chrysotricha

Binomial name
- Acacia chrysotricha Tindale
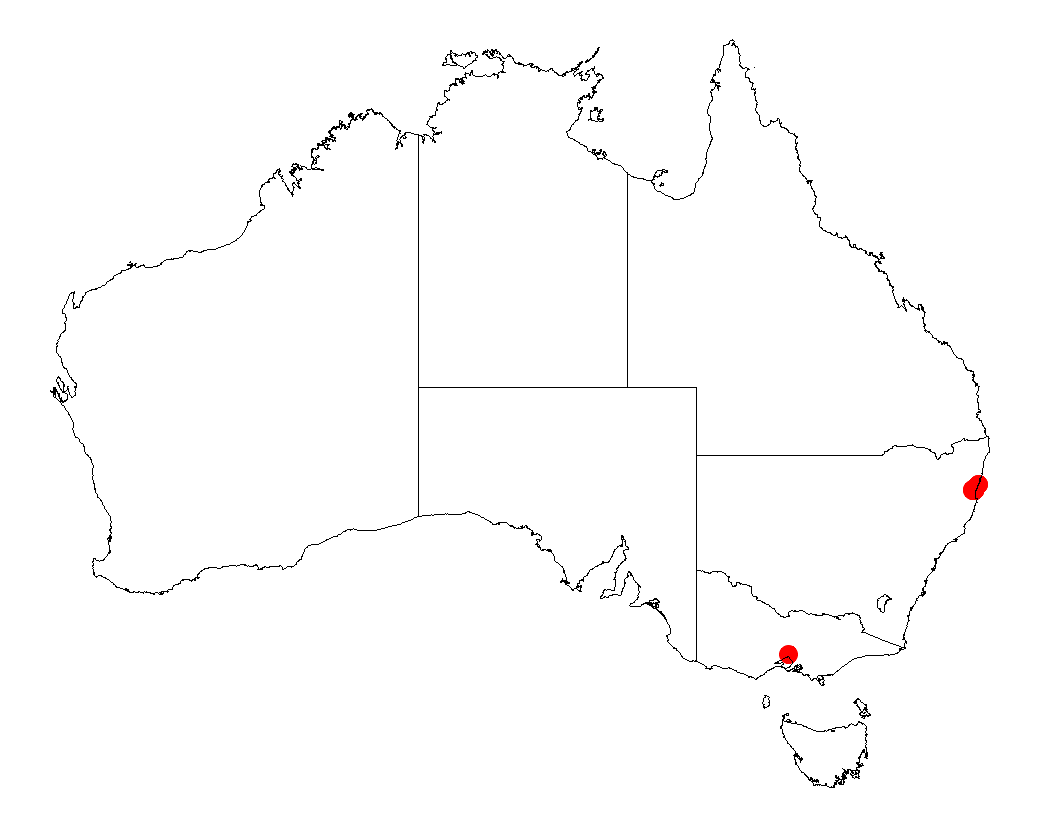
- Occurrence data from AVH

Synonyms
- Racosperma chrysotrichum (Tindale) Pedley

= Acacia chrysotricha =

Newry golden wattle

Species of legume

Acacia chrysotricha, commonly known as Bellinger River wattle or Newry golden wattle, is a species of flowering plant in the family Fabaceae and is endemic to a restricted area of New South Wales, Australia. It is a tree with grey to reddish brown bark, densely hairy branchlets, bipinnate leaves with 12 to 18 pairs of leaflets, each with 12 to 25 pairs of pinnules, spherical heads of bright yellow to golden yellow flowers and straight to slightly curved, thinly leathery pods.

== Description ==
Acacia chrysotricha is a tree that typically grows to a height of 6–21 m (20–69 ft) and has fissured grey to reddish brown bark. Its branchlets are densely covered with spreading golden, grey or fawn coloured hairs. The tips of immature foliage are covered with soft, deep golden hairs. The leaves are bipinnate with 12 to 18 pairs of leaflets mostly 15–45 mm (0.59–1.77 in) long, on a rachis 50–140 mm (2.0–5.5 in) long, each leaflet with 12 to 25 pairs of oblong to narrowly oblong or more or less lance-shaped pinnules 3–4.5 mm (0.12–0.18 in) long. The leaves are dark green on the upper surface, paler below. The flowers are borne in spherical heads in racemes in leaf axils or in panicles on the ends of branchlets on peduncles 3–7 mm (0.12–0.28 in) long, each head 4–7 mm (0.16–0.28 in) in diameter with 15 to 30 bright yellow to golden yellow flowers. Flowering occurs from about July to August, and the pods are straight to slightly curved, more or less flat, 30–100 mm (1.2–3.9 in) long and 4–6 mm (0.16–0.24 in) wide, thinly leathery, dark brown or black with dark brown or whitish hairs.

The tree is reasonably short lived and requires fire to stimulate germination.

== Taxonomy ==
Acacia chrysotricha was first formally described in 1966 by Mary Tindale in Contributions from the New South Wales National Herbarium from specimens collected near Urunga by Alex Floyd in 1961. The specific epithet (chrysotricha) means 'golden hair', and refers to the coarse golden hairs on the branchlets.

== Distribution ==
Bellinger River wattle is endemic to a small area in the north eastern corner of New South Wales within the Brierfield and Newry State Forest area inland from Macksville, where it often grows in steep, narrow gullies in quartzite based soils in tall open forest communities or in rainforest.

== Conservation status ==
Acacia chrysotricha is listed as 'endangered" under the IUCN Red List and the New South Wales Government Biodiversity Conservation Act.

== See also ==
- List of Acacia species
