= Biggera Creek Dam =

Dam in south-east Queensland, Australia

- Location of the dam in Queensland
- Interactive map of Biggera Creek Dam
- Official name: Biggera Creek Flood Mitigation Dam
- Country: Australia
- Location: Arundel, South East Queensland
- Coordinates: 27°56′54″S 153°22′59″E
- Purpose: Flood control
- Status: Operational
- Opening date: 1986
- Operator: Gold Coast City Council

Dam and spillways
- Type of dam: Earth fill dam
- Impounds: Biggera Creek
- Height (foundation): 12.3 m (40 ft)
- Height (thalweg): 12.5 m (41 ft)
- Length: 320 m (1,050 ft)
- Elevation at crest: 15 m (49 ft)
- Width (crest): 5.6 m (18 ft)
- Spillway type: Uncontrolled
- Spillway length: 30 m (98 ft)
- Spillway capacity: 8.4×10^{3} m^{3}/s (300×10^{3} cu ft/s)

Reservoir
- Total capacity: 2,980 ML (2,420 acre⋅ft)
- Normal elevation: 12.3 m (40 ft) AHD (when flooding)

The Biggera Creek Dam, or formally the Biggera Creek Flood Mitigation Dam, is an earth-filled embankment dam across the Biggera Creek, located approximately 3 kilometres (1.9 mi) northwest of Southport in the suburb of Arundel, in the South East region of Queensland, Australia. The dam was established for flood mitigation purposes.

== Overview ==
Completed in 1986, the dam wall is 12.5 metres (41 ft) and 320 metres (1,050 ft) long. The resultant reservoir has a capacity of 2,980 megalitres (2,420 acre⋅ft). The dam's retention basin includes low lying areas and a golf course at Parkwood. The dam is usually empty, providing capacity for the dam to hold excess water during flood events. Since the dam was constructed, the highest recorded water level was 12.24 metres (40.2 ft) AHD in June 2005; just below the spillway crest at 12.3 metres (40 ft) AHD.

The dam is operated by the Gold Coast City Council. Following a detailed engineering review and risk assessment, the Council completed remediation works to the dam's outlet, embankment slope, and spillway during 2023 and 2024.

== See also ==
- List of dams and reservoirs in Australia
