= Helensvale, Queensland =

Helensvale
- Suburb
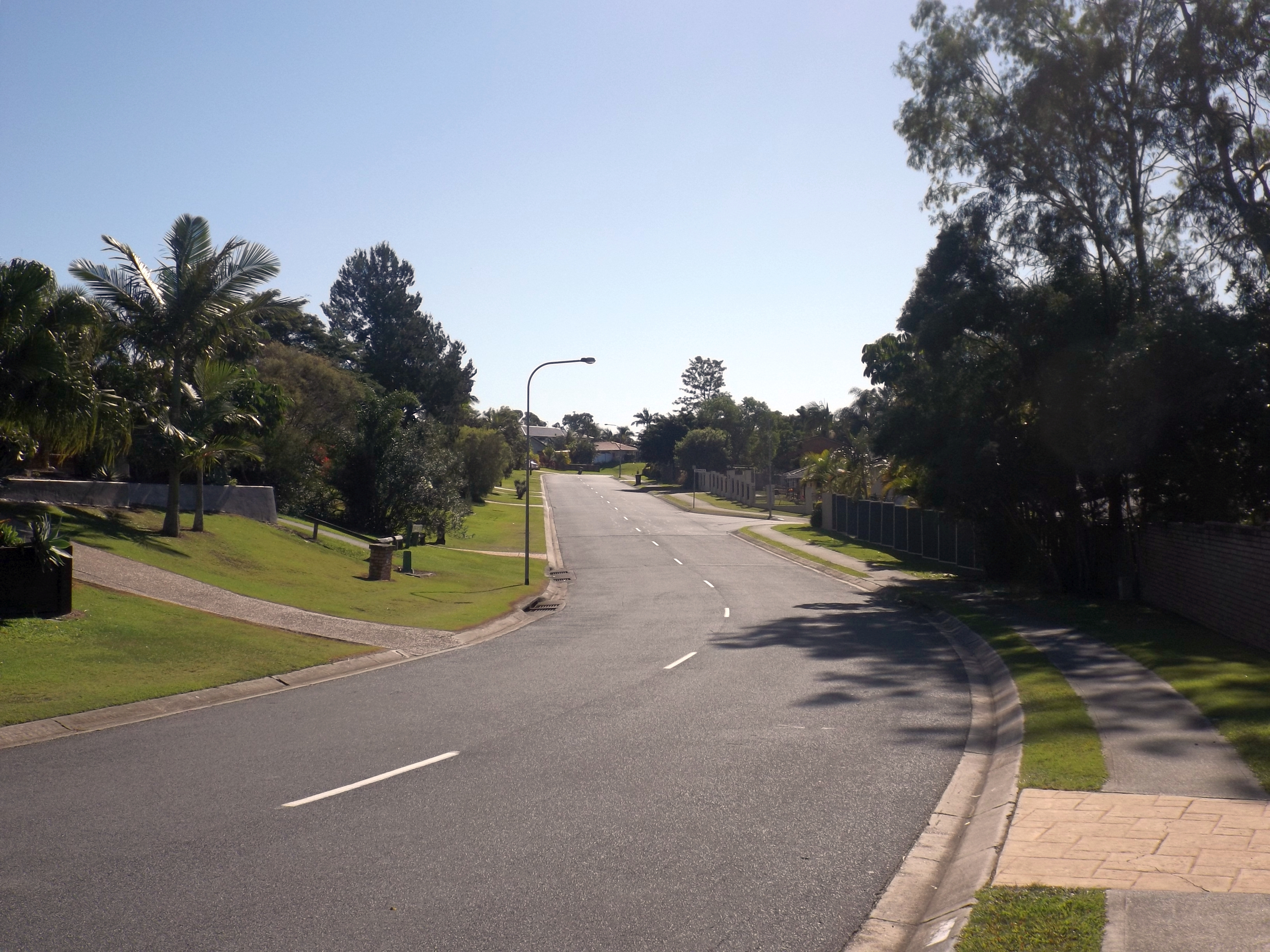
- Latrobe Avenue, 2015

- Interactive map of Helensvale
- Coordinates: 27.9008°S 153.3377°E
- Country: Australia
- State: Queensland
- City: Gold Coast
- LGA: City of Gold Coast
- Location: 18.7 km (11.6 mi) NNW of Surfers Paradise; 63.9 km (39.7 mi) SSE of Brisbane; 12.7 km (7.9 mi) NW of Southport; 42.6 km (26.5 mi) NNW of Tweed Heads

Government
  - State electorates: Theodore; Broadwater; Bonney
  - Federal division: Fadden

Area
  - Total: 21.6 km^{2} (8.3 sq mi)
- Elevation: 7 m (23 ft)

Population
  - Total: 18,949 (2021 census)
  - Density: 877.3/km^{2} (2,272/sq mi)
- Time zone: UTC+10:00 (AEST)
- Postcode: 4212
Suburbs around Helensvale
Upper Coomera	Coomera	Hope Island; Paradise Point
Oxenford	Helensvale	Coombabah
Oxenford	Gaven	Arundel

Helensvale is a northern suburb of the City of Gold Coast in Queensland, Australia. In the 2021 census, Helensvale had a population of 18,949 people.

== Geography ==
Helensvale is bounded by the Pacific Motorway to the west, by the Coomera River to the north, by Saltwater Creek to the north-east, by Coombabah Creek and Coombabah Lake to the south-east.

Saltwater Creek flows through the suburb from west (Oxenford) to the north from where it forms the north-east boundary of the suburb.

The principal land use is residential including some canal estates in the north of the suburb providing boat access to Coomera River and Saltwater Creek. There are areas of low-lying mangrove swamps along the Coombabah Creek. Saltwater Creek Conservation Park is small protected area (27.8947°S 153.3182°E) of 1.8 hectares (4.4 acres) in the west of the suburb.

The Gold Coast railway line passes through the suburb from north (Coomera) to south (Arundel). The suburb is served by the Helensvale railway station (27.9255°S 153.3392°E). The G:link has its northern terminus at the railway station and then exits the suburb to the south running immediately parallel and east of the railway line.

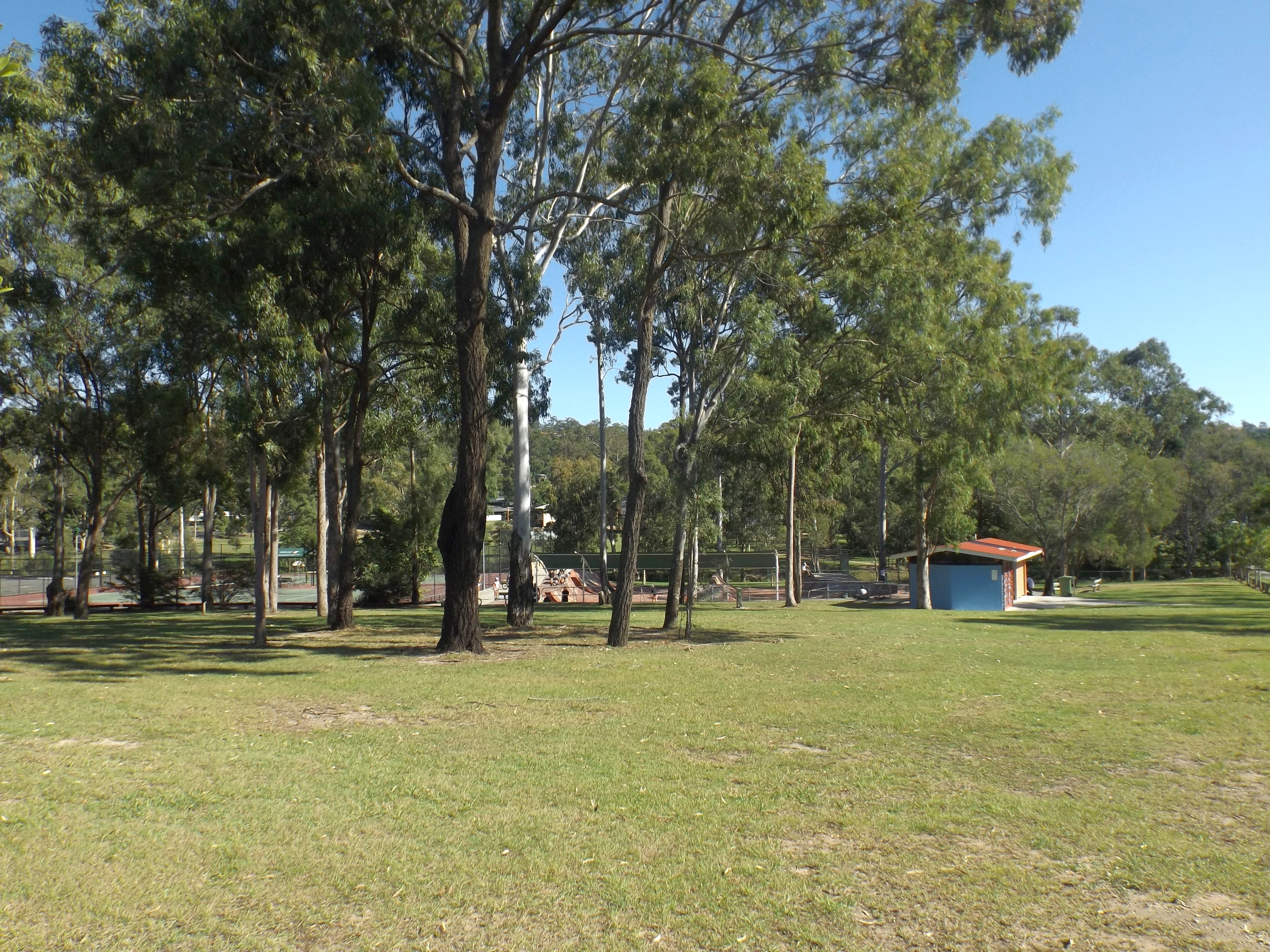
Discovery Park, 2015

== History ==
The name is derived from the name given to a local sugar plantation. A plantation was established in the area around 1870 by Arthur Robinson and Ernest White. Helena was the name of White's youngest sister.

Helensvale was officially named as a locality by the Queensland Place Names Board on 31 March 1979. On 7 February 2003 it was designated as a suburb.

Helensvale was the first integrated suburb built on the hinterland fringe of the Gold Coast, and welcomed its first residents in the 1980s with a shopping centre, primary and secondary state schools, golf course, parks and a bowls club.

Helensvale State School opened on 23 January 1984.

Helensvale State High School opened on 29 January 1990.

Westfield Helensvale opened on 13 October 2005.

Helensvale Library opened in 2013.

== Demographics ==
In the 2016 census, Helensvale had a population of 16,862 people.

In the 2021 census, Helensvale had a population of 18,949 people.

== Transport ==
Helensvale has been planned to develop as a transport hub. The Gold Coast Highway and Pacific Motorway, the two most important road routes on the Gold Coast, link here. Helensvale railway station also includes a light rail stop and a bus interchange and is the only place on the Gold Coast where trains, trams and buses interconnect. The G:link light rail system connects Helensvale with Southport, Surfers Paradise and Broadbeach. The interchange with the Gold Coast railway line at Helensvale offers passengers a one-transfer journey between the central districts of the Gold Coast and Brisbane.

A second railway station is being planned in the north of the suburb, to be named Hope Island railway station.

== Education ==
Helensvale State School is a government primary (Prep–6) school for boys and girls at 8 Lindfield Road (27.9159°S 153.3279°E). In 2017, the school had an enrolment of 1066 students with 73 teachers (66 full-time equivalent) and 34 non-teaching staff (24 full-time equivalent). It includes a special education program.

Helensvale State High School is a government secondary (7–12) school for boys and girls at 243 Discovery Drive (27.8981°S 153.3267°E). In 2017, the school had an enrolment of 2543 students with 193 teachers (183 full-time equivalent) and 76 non-teaching staff (56 full-time equivalent). It includes a special education program.

== Amenities ==
The Gold Coast City Council operates a public library at Helensvale Plaza on the corner of Lindfield Road and Sir John Overall Drive.

== Sport and recreation ==
A number of sporting teams represent the local area, including the Helensvale Hornets is the local rugby league club who play home games at Robert Dalley Park and Helensvale Hogs RUFC are the local Rugby Union club who play home games at the park at Rugby Lane. There are also swimming pools which are located next to Helensvale High School near the rugby union field.
