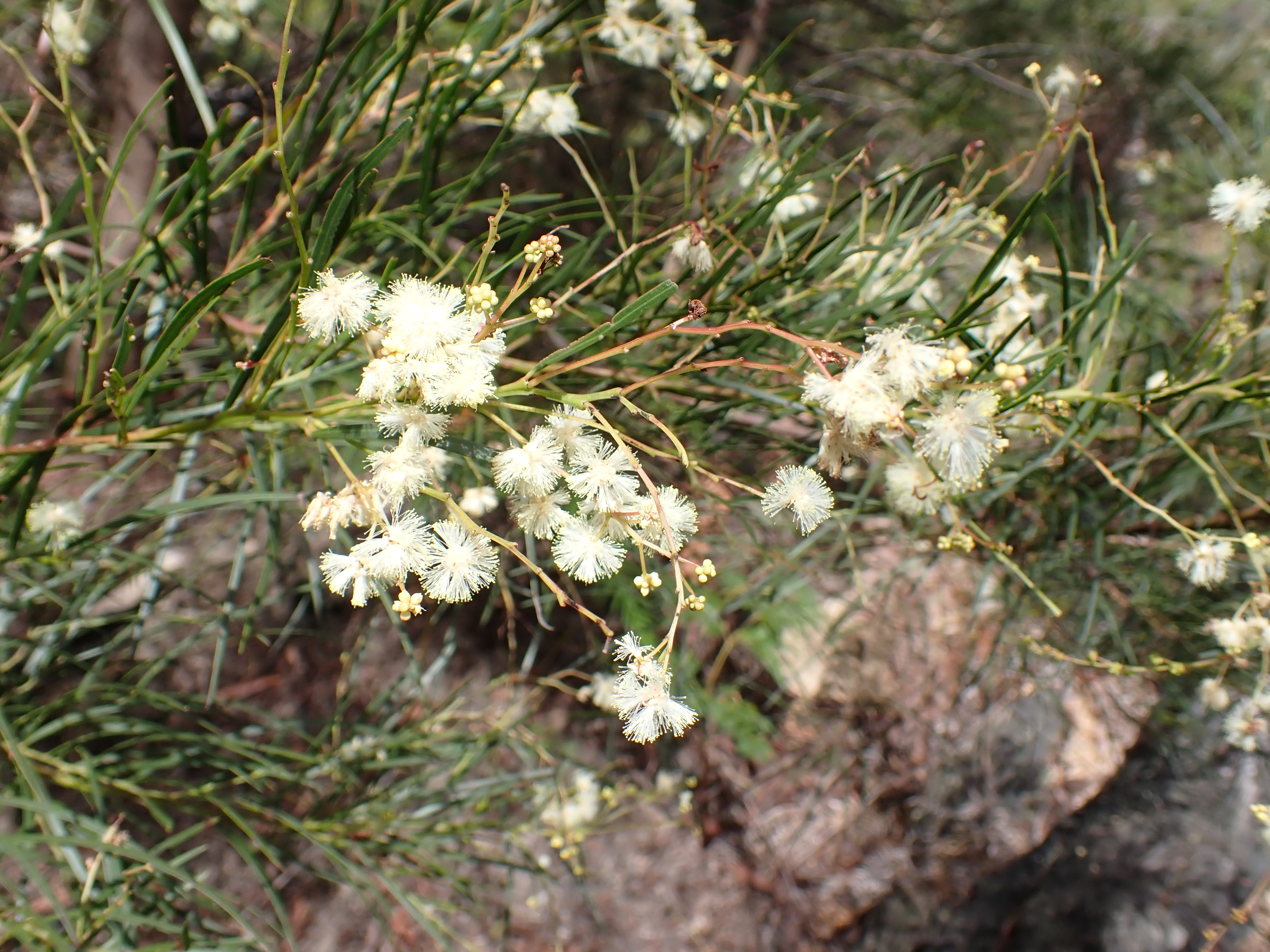

Scientific classification
- Kingdom: Plantae
- Clade: Tracheophytes
- Clade: Angiosperms
- Clade: Eudicots
- Clade: Rosids
- Order: Fabales
- Family: Fabaceae
- Subfamily: Caesalpinioideae
- Clade: Mimosoid clade
- Genus: Acacia
- Species: A. floydii

Binomial name
- Acacia floydii Tindale
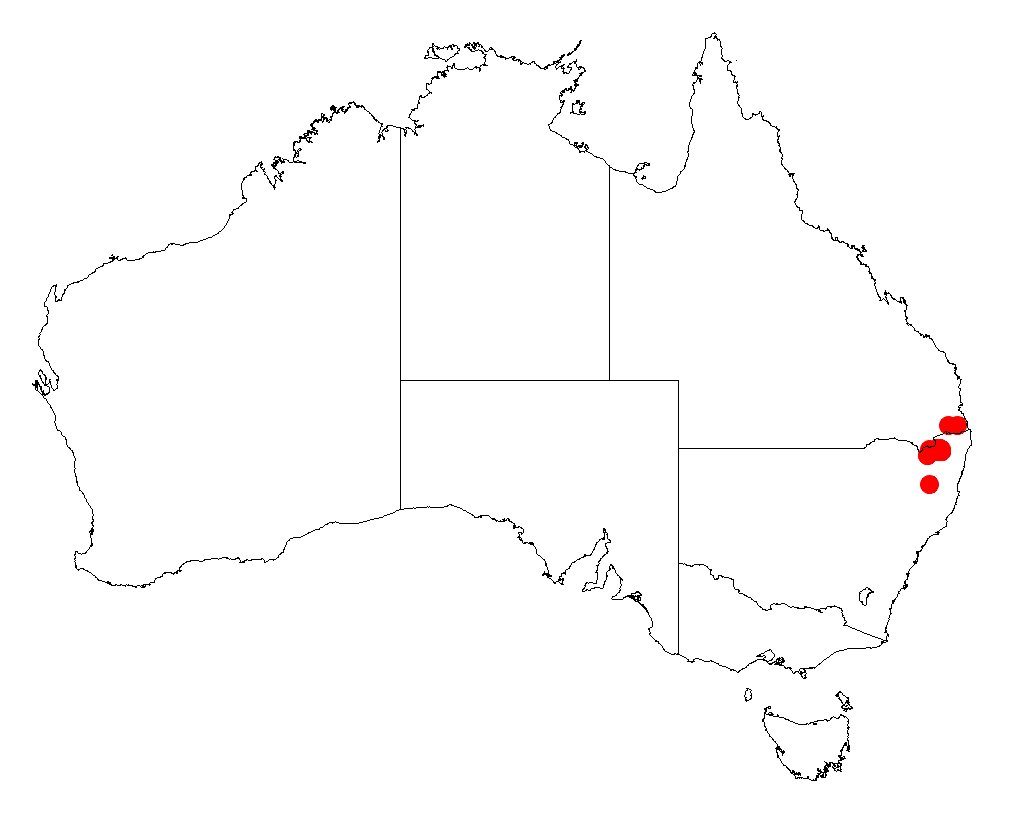
- Occurrence data from AVH

= Acacia floydii =

Species of legume

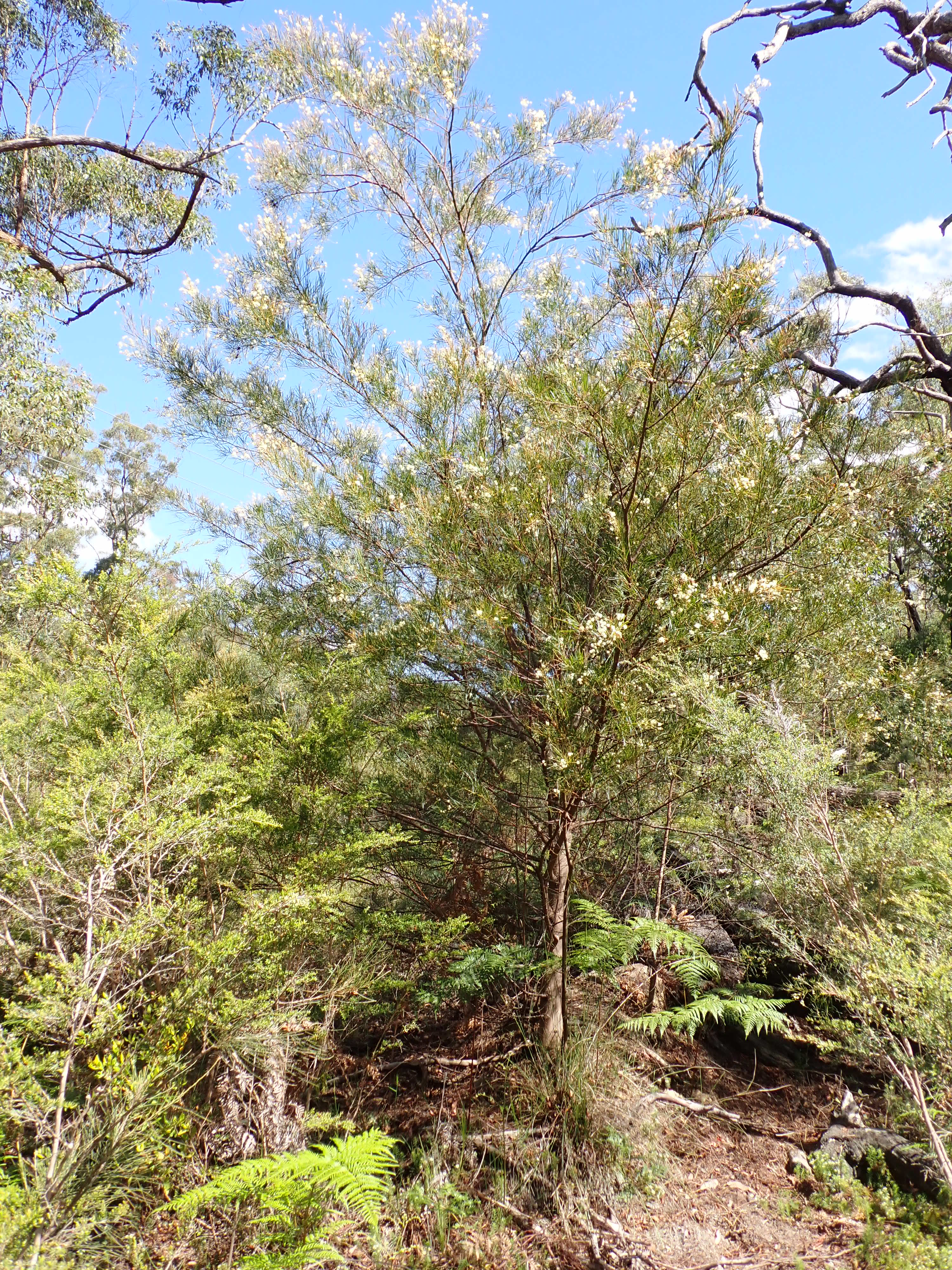
Habit in the Demon Nature Reserve, near Tenterfield

Acacia floydii is a species of flowering plant in the family Fabaceae and is endemic to a restricted area of New South Wales, Australia. It is a slender shrub or tree with glabrous, dark coloured branchlets, narrowly linear phyllodes, spherical heads of pale yellow, cream-coloured to more or less white flowers and leathery dark brown to blackish pods.

== Description ==
Acacia floydii is an erect, slender, spreading shrub or tree that typically grows to a height of 1.5–4.5 m (4 ft 11 in – 14 ft 9 in) but can reach up to 10 m (33 ft). Its branchlets are dark coloured, flat or triangular in cross section and glabrous. The phyllodes are narrowly linear 70–120 mm (2.8–4.7 in) long, 1–3 mm (0.039–0.118 in) wide and glabrous with a single vein and a gland 3–15 mm (0.12–0.59 in) above the base of the phyllode.The flowers are borne in eight to eleven spherical heads in racemes 30–65 mm (1.2–2.6 in) long on peduncles 5–9 mm (0.20–0.35 in) long. Each head has eight to twelve loosley arranged pale yellow, cream-coloured to more or less white flowers. The pods are narrowly oblong, leathery to thinly leathery, up to 100 mm (3.9 in) long, 8–9 mm (0.31–0.35 in) wide, glabrous and dark brown to blackish. The seeds are oblong, about 6 mm (0.24 in) long and slightly shiny blackish with a club-shaped aril.

== Taxonomy ==
Acacia floydii was first formally described in 1980 in the journal Telopea (journal)|Telopea from specimens collected 15 mi (24 km) from Tenterfield on the Timbarra Road in 1955. The specific epithet honours Alexander Floyd who drew the author's attention to this species and arranged for the collection of material.

== Distribution and habitat ==
This species of wattle is restricted to the escarpment range east of Tenterfield where it grows in moist sand on granite or near creeks in eucalypt forest.

== See also ==
- List of Acacia species
