= Nerang National Park =

National park in Australia

- IUCN category II (national park)
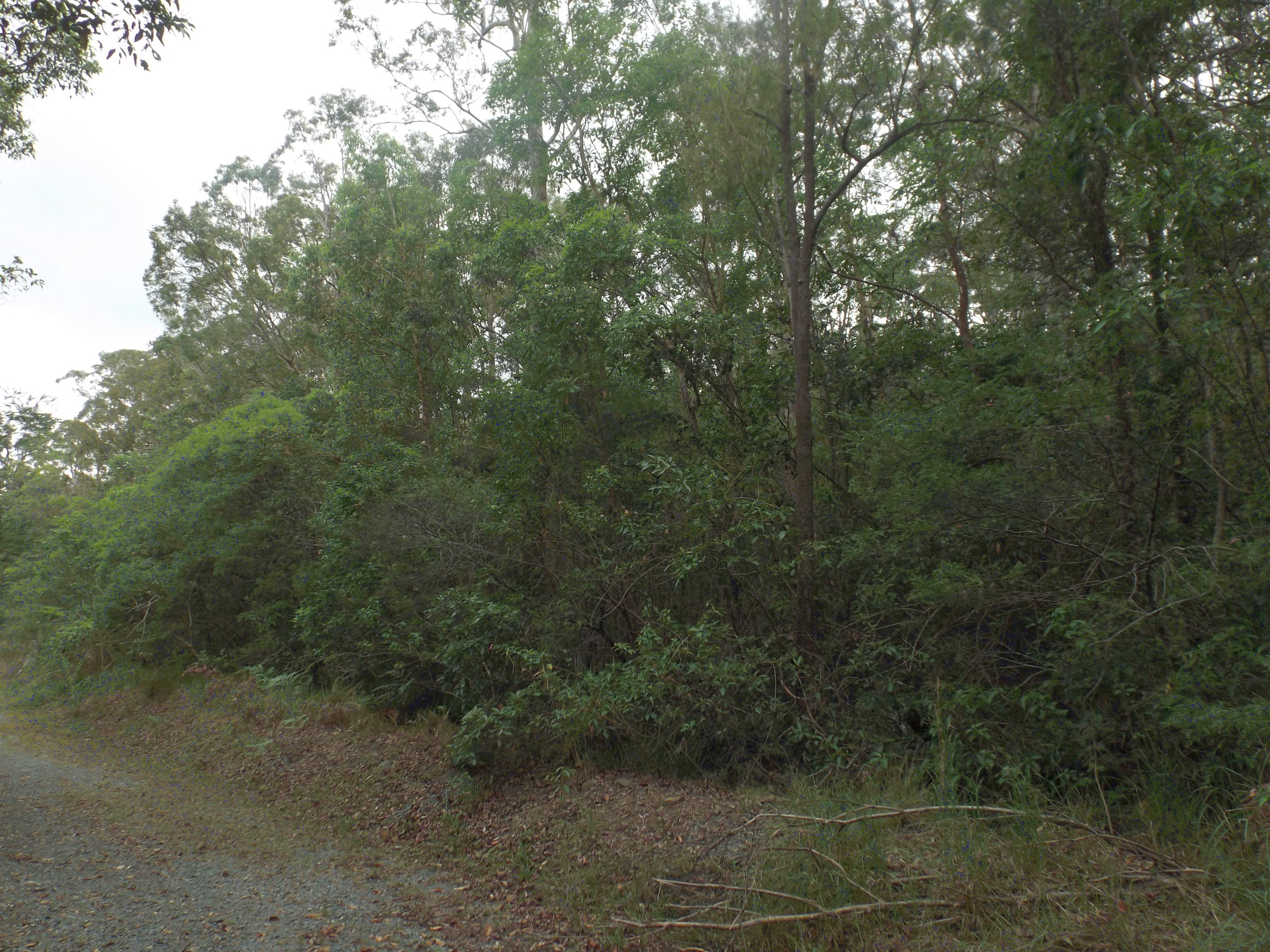
- Cargellico Street bush, 2016

- Location within Queensland
- Location: Queensland
- Nearest city: Nerang
- Coordinates: 27°58′20″S 153°18′12″E
- Area: 17 km^{2} (6.6 sq mi)
- Governing body: Queensland Parks and Wildlife Service
- Website: Official website

Nerang National Park (commonly referred to as Nerang State Forest) is a national park in Queensland, Australia situated on the Gold Coast. The protected area is located 12 kilometres (7.5 mi) from Surfers Paradise on Nerang’s north-west outskirts.

Nerang National Park is known for its variety of birds, trails, and views. Making it a popular place for mountain bike riders, bushwalkers and bird watchers.

Nerang National Park is of cultural significance to the local indigenous people, the Kombumerri clan.

== Environment ==
Nerang National Park is an open forest environment providing a habitat for lot of native and non-native animals. The land of the Nerang National Park is around 100 m above sea level and located 8 kilometres (5.0 mi) from the Pacific Ocean. The Nerang National Park is mostly small-large hills. Both the Coombabah and Saltwater creeks run through the Nerang National Park. The soil in the park is mostly clay and limestone though near rivers and in fertile areas the soil is more loamy and aerated.

Nerang National Park

Towards the centre of Nerang National Park is a small patch of critically endangered subtropical lowland rainforest, listed under the EPBC Act 1999. This area of the National Park is the headwaters of the Ramsar-listed Coombabah Lake Conservation Park, an area of international conservation significance. There are several threatened fauna species that reside in Nerang National Park including the greater glider, koala, glossy black-cockatoo, Richmond birdwing butterfly, grey-headed flying fox, powerful owl, echidna, and tusked frog. Conservation-significant flora known to occur in Nerang National Park include Rhodamnia rubescens, Rhodomyrtus psidioides, Cassia marksiana, Endiandra floydii, Endiandra hayesii, Macadamia integrifolia, Sophora fraseri, Randia moorei, Leichhardtia coronata, and Leichhardtia longiloba. Two near threatened rainforest plant species are known to occur in the gullies and along the wetter creeks, Richmond birdwing butterfly vine and the long-leaved tuckeroo.

== Recreation ==
The Nerang National Park is used for all sorts of sports such as horse riding, mountain biking and trail running. The park consist of many fire trails and tracks making it very popular for bike riding, horse riding and walking.

== See also ==
- Protected areas of Queensland
- Kombumerri clan
