= Oxenford, Queensland =

Oxenford
- Suburb
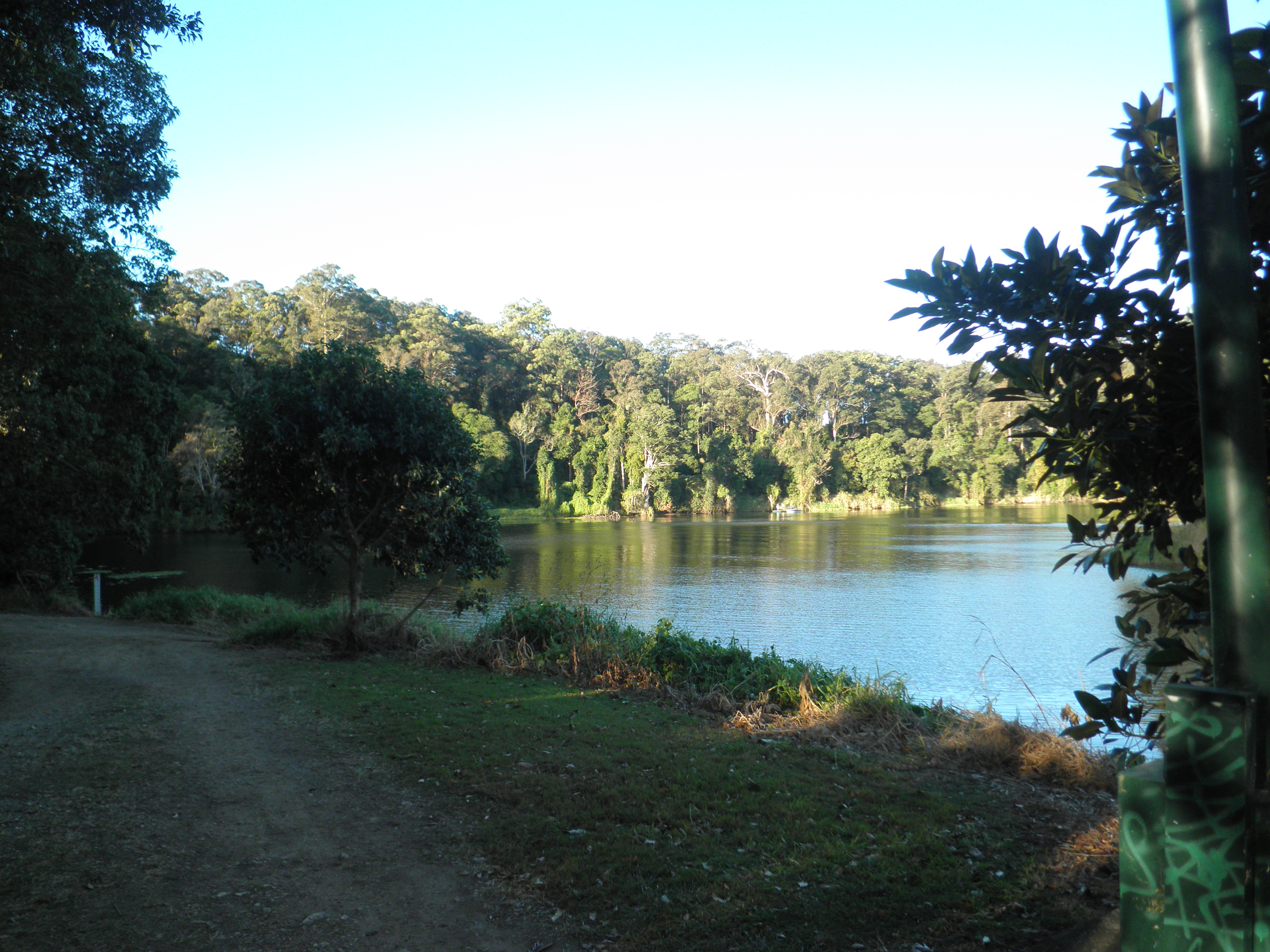
- View from Old Tamborine Road overlooking the Coomera River

- Interactive map of Oxenford
- Coordinates: 27.9061°S 153.3038°E
- Country: Australia
- State: Queensland
- City: Gold Coast
- LGA: City of Gold Coast
- Location: 18.8 km (11.7 mi) NNW of Surfers Paradise; 61.6 km (38.3 mi) SSE of Brisbane; 15.3 km (9.5 mi) NW of Southport; 45.1 km (28.0 mi) NNW of Tweed Heads

Government
  - State electorate: Theodore
  - Federal divisions: Fadden; Wright

Area
  - Total: 13.9 km^{2} (5.4 sq mi)
- Elevation: 8 m (26 ft)

Population
  - Total: 12,273 (2021 census)
  - Density: 883/km^{2} (2,287/sq mi)
- Time zone: UTC+10:00 (AEST)
- Postcode: 4210
Suburbs around Oxenford
Upper Coomera	Upper Coomera	Coomera
Maudsland	Oxenford	Helensvale
Maudsland	Pacific Pines	Gaven

Oxenford is a suburb in the City of Gold Coast, Queensland, Australia. In the 2021 census, Oxenford had a population of 12,273 people.

== Geography ==
The suburb is bordered to the west and north by the Coomera River, to the east by the Pacific Motorway and to the south by Universal Street, Binstead Way, Kopps Road and the Gaven Arterial Road.

The western edge of the suburb is also bordered by the Coomera River, which can only be crossed via the Coomera River causeway. Tamborine-Oxenford Road (State Route 95) runs through from west to north-east.

The neighborhood of Studio Village is the south of the suburb (27.9191°S 153.3177°E). It is adjacent to Wet'n'Wild Water World and Warner Bros. Movie World. the subdivision's name itself was inspired by Movie World. The street names in the subdivision refer to objects or people within Hollywood and film culture.

== History ==
The suburb takes its name from the railway station which in turn was named after William Robert Oxenford, who purchased 160 acres (65 ha) in the Coomera district in 1869 and served for many years in the Coomera Shire Council.

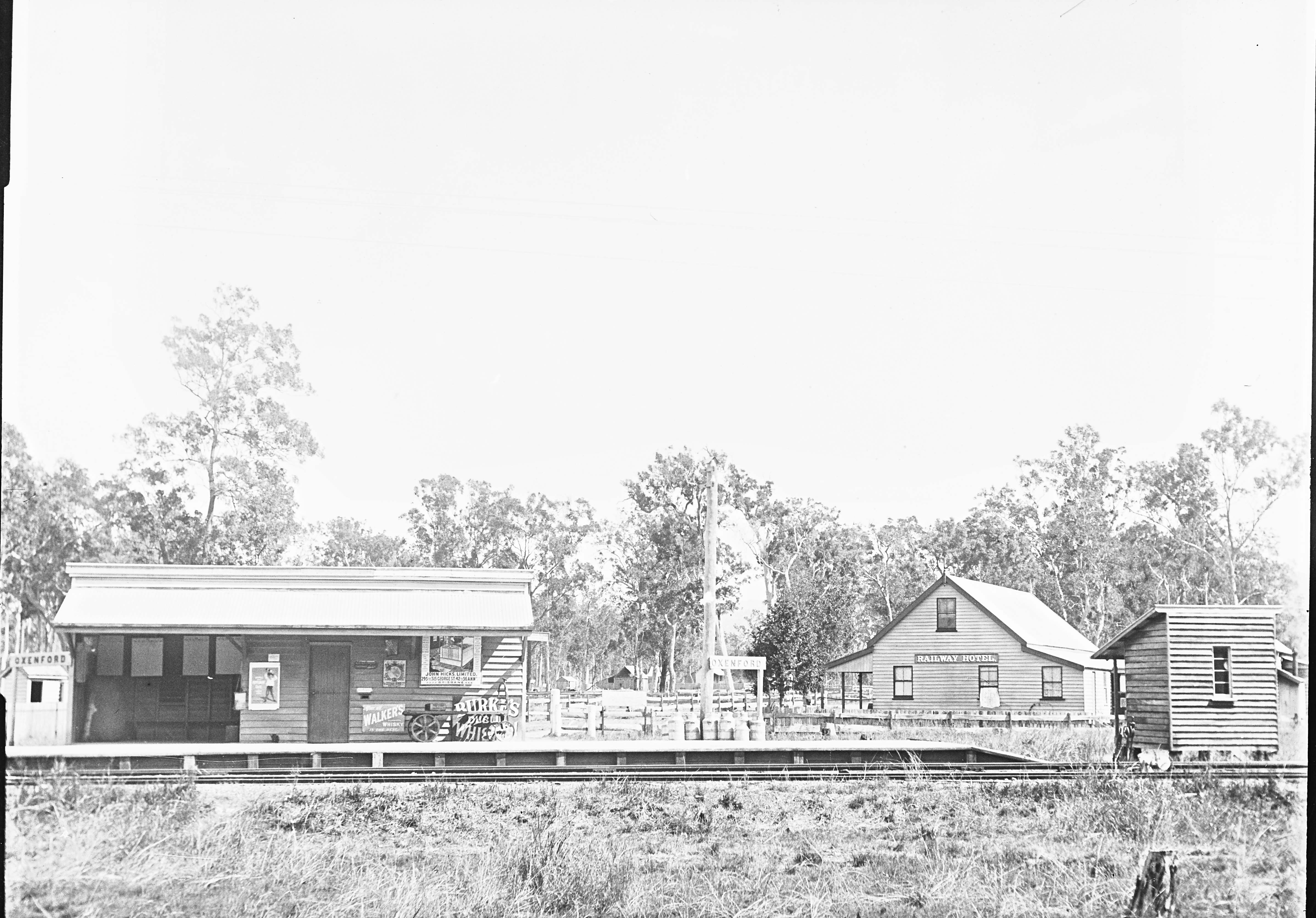
Oxenford Railway Station and Oxenford Railway Hotel

The South Coast railway line was an extension of the Beenleigh railway line to Southport. The line opened on 24 January 1889 with Oxenford railway station (approx 27.8855°S 153.3154°E), originally named 39 Mile Platform because it was 39 miles (63 km) from the terminus at South Brisbane railway station. The station was in use until 30 June 1964 when the line closed. When the modern Gold Coast railway line was built in 1996, the line did not pass through Oxenford but through Helensvale to the east and Helensvale railway station is the nearest station to Oxenford. However, the Pacific Motorway roughly follows the route of the old South Coast railway line.

Work on the road south to Southport was undertaken in 1928.

Oxenford State School opened on 27 January 1987.

Gaven State School opened on 27 January 1995.

== Demographics ==
In the 2016 census, Oxenford had a population of 11,842 people. Aboriginal and Torres Strait Islander people made up 1.7% of the population. 66.2% of people were born in Australia. The next most common countries of birth were New Zealand 10.0%, England 6.0% and South Africa 1.7%. 86.2% of people spoke only English at home. Other languages spoken at home included Mandarin at 1.0%. The most common responses for religion were No Religion 33.4%, Catholic 19.1% and Anglican 18.5%.

In the 2021 census, Oxenford had a population of 12,273 people.

== Education ==
Oxenford State School is a government primary (Prep–6) school for boys and girls at 90 Michigan Drive (27.8994°S 153.3039°E). In 2017, the school had an enrolment of 559 students with 41 teachers (35 full-time equivalent) and 23 non-teaching staff (15 full-time equivalent). It includes a special education program.

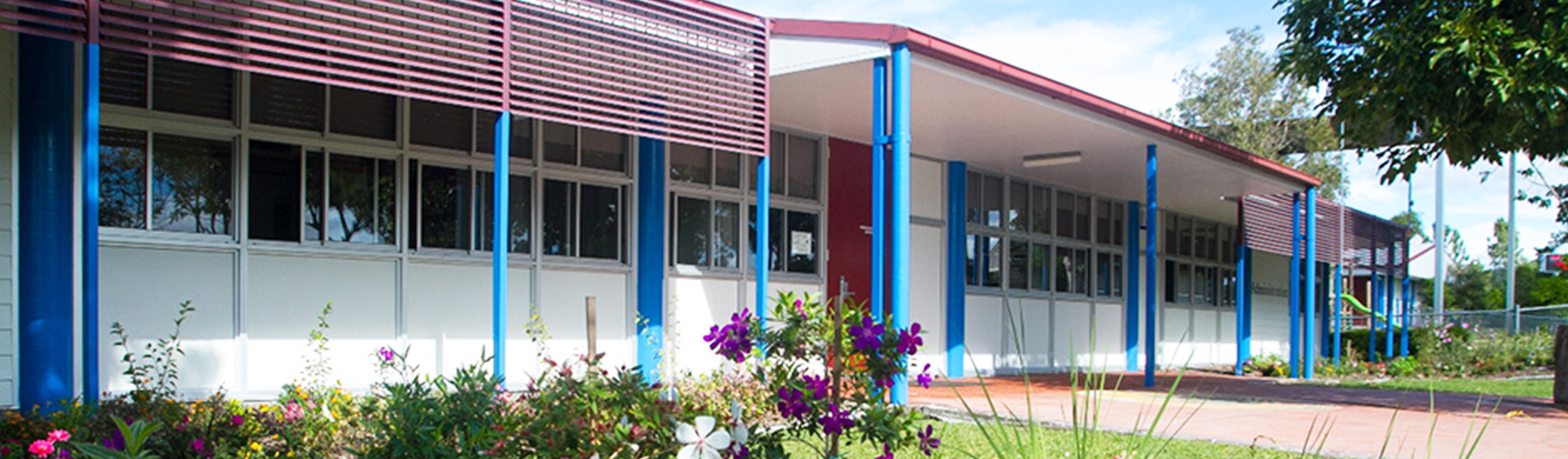
Gaven State School, 2025

Gaven State School is a government primary (Prep–6) school for boys and girls on Universal Street (27.9196°S 153.3051°E). In 2017, the school had an enrolment of 694 students with 50 teachers (43 full-time equivalent) and 35 non-teaching staff (27 full-time equivalent). It includes a special education program.

There are no secondary schools in Oxenford. The nearest government secondary schools are Helensvale State High School in Helensvale and Pacific Pines State High School in Pacific Pines.

== Community groups ==
The Coomera branch of the Queensland Country Women's Association meets at the 161 Maudsland Road (27.9142°S 153.2829°E).

There is a Neighbourhood Watch group in Oxenford.

== Attractions ==
Theme parks Warner Bros. Movie World (27.907°S 153.313°E) and Wet'n'Wild Water World (27.915°S 153.318°E) are located within Oxenford's boundaries.
