= Moreton Bay Marine Park =

Marine park in Australia

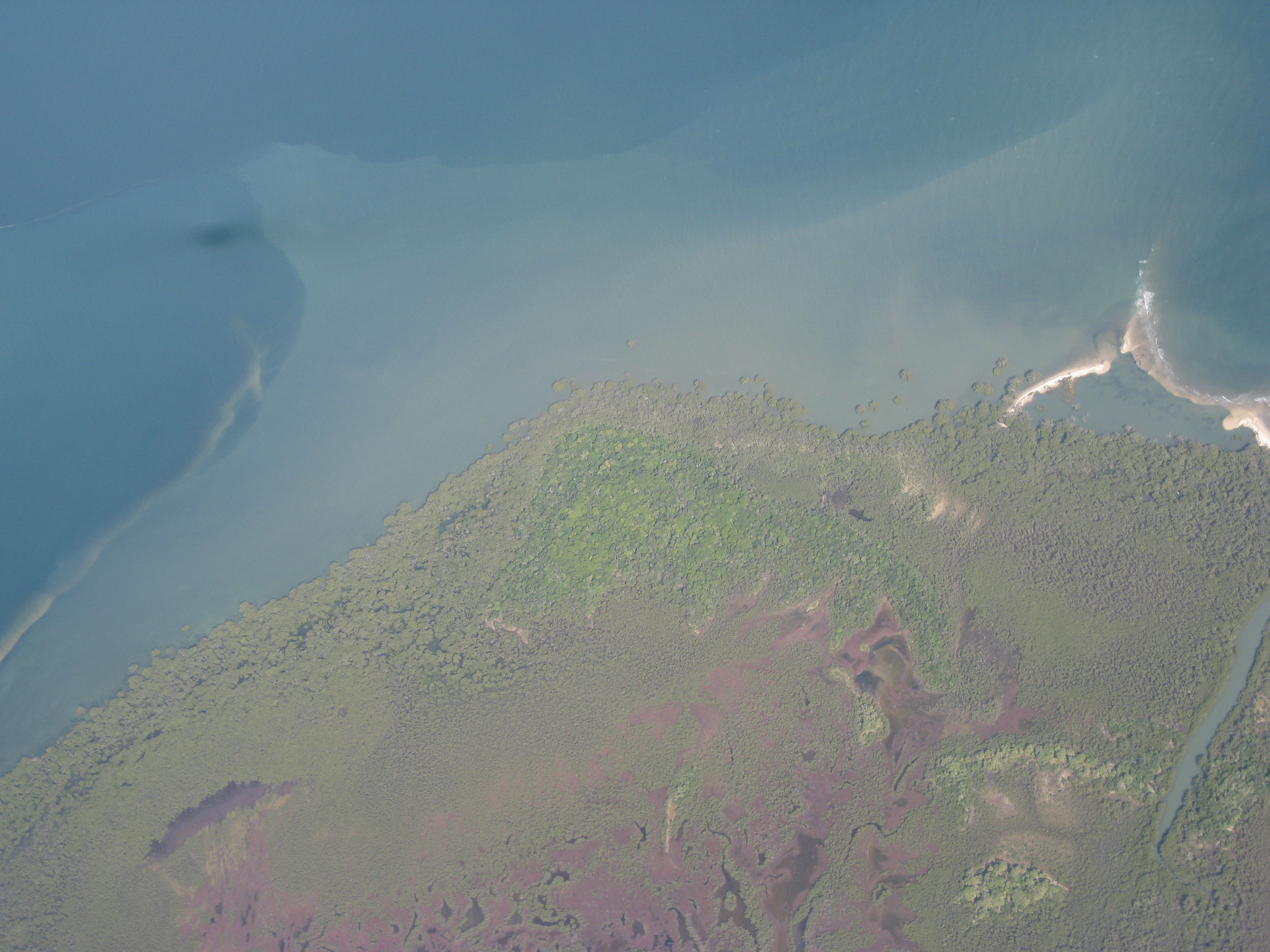
- Aerial photo of Mud Island, 2009

- Location within Queensland
- Location: Queensland
- Nearest city: Brisbane
- Coordinates: 27°25′48″S 153°23′47″E
- Area: 3,400 km^{2} (1,300 sq mi)
- Established: 1993
- Governing body: Queensland Parks and Wildlife Service
- Website: Official website

The Moreton Bay Marine Park was established in 1993 to protect ecologically significant habitats in Moreton Bay. The marine park extends from Caloundra south to the southern tip of South Stradbroke Island. The marine park's border extends up to the highest tidal mark and covers a total of 3,400 km2.

The marine park provides protection to sensitive reef sites near Tangalooma and Flinders Reef. It includes waterways such as Coombabah Lake, sheltered inlets, open ocean, mangrove forests, swamps, marshes, tidal mudflats, sandflats and seagrass beds. It is a temporary home to migrating shorebirds that inhabit wetlands. Dugongs, whales and turtles swim in the waters of the bay. Six of the world's seven species of sea turtles habitat the park.

The marine park is managed by the Queensland Parks and Wildlife Service. In 1971, a total of 18 countries signed a Convention on Wetlands of International Significance. It was signed in Ramsar, a city in Iran, and came to be known as the Ramsar Convention, which aimed at stopping global loss of wetlands, and conservation and sustainable management of the remaining wetlands. Moreton Bay is among Australia's largest sites which is listed under the Ramsar Convention.

== History ==
The Moreton Bay Marine Park was declared in 1993. Commencing in 2008, the Queensland Government has spent AU2$ million to create three artificial reefs within the marine park. One of these is Turner Reef, is 20-hectare (49-acre) site off the coast of Scarborough (27.1963°S 153.1293°E).

From 1 March 2009, activities in the marine park are designated under the Marine Park Zoning Plan. 16% of the bay is protected in green zones or marine national park zones. This leaves 84% of the marine park available to anglers. The marine national park zones are classed as IUCN Category II while the remainder is classed as IUCN Category VI.

In 2010, a comprehensive fish survey was conducted within the park. 1,190 different fish species in total were found. Several new species were discovered.

Mud discharged into bay from the Brisbane River during the 2010–2011 Queensland floods smothered many marine ecosystems with sediment. Seagrass meadows found across the bay were especially exposed.

== Marine Park Zoning Plan ==
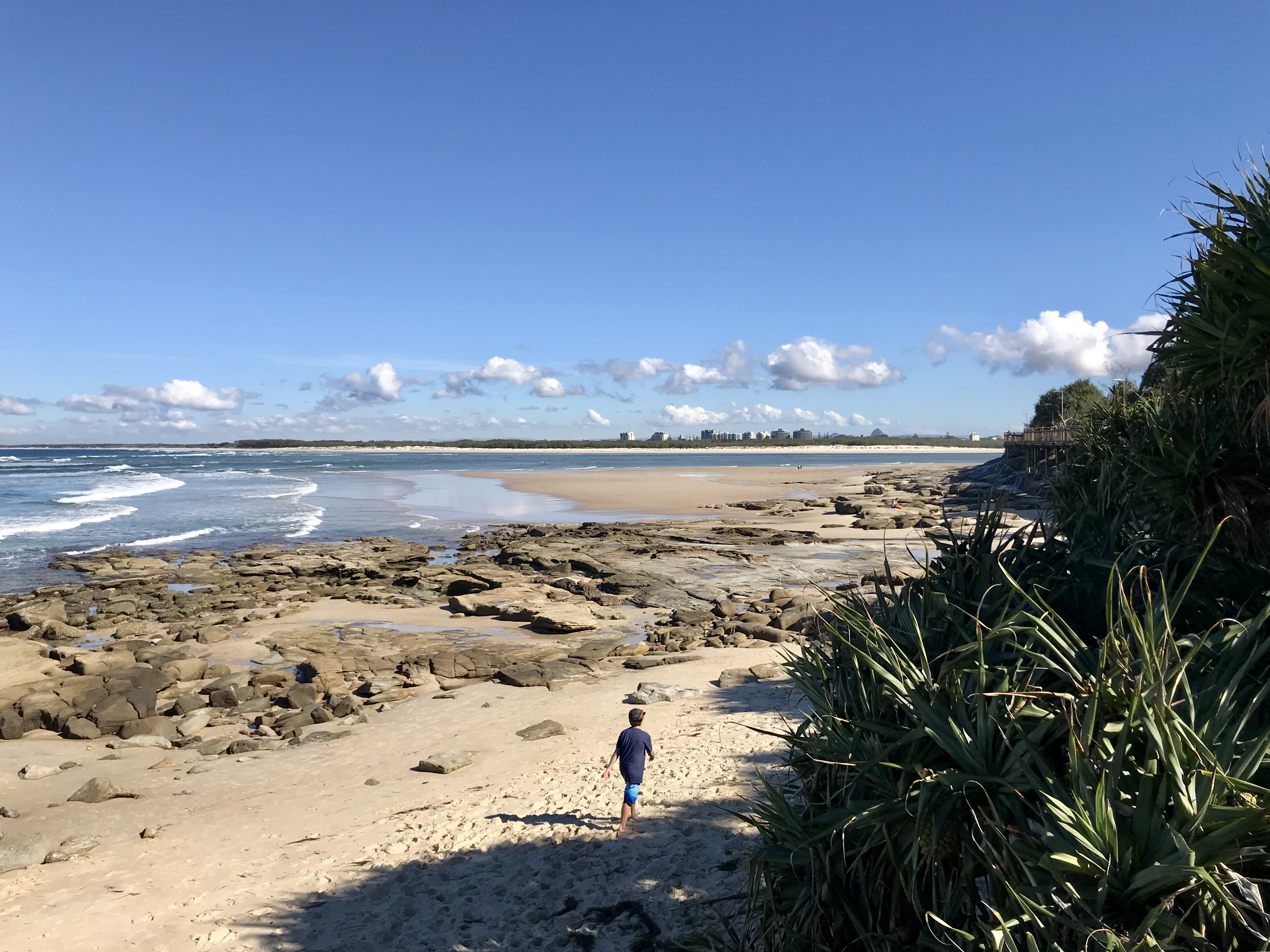
Intertidal zone at Kings Beach, 2018

There are four zones in Moreton Bay Marine Park. These are the Marine national park zone (green) which contain areas of high conservation value, Conservation park zone (yellow) allowing limited fishing and crabbing, Habitat protection (dark blue) zone for sensitive habitats with no trawling allowed and General use zone (light blue) allow activities such as trawling. The zones are patrolled by rangers. Fines of up to A$500 for fishing in the green zone have been issued.

=== Designated areas ===
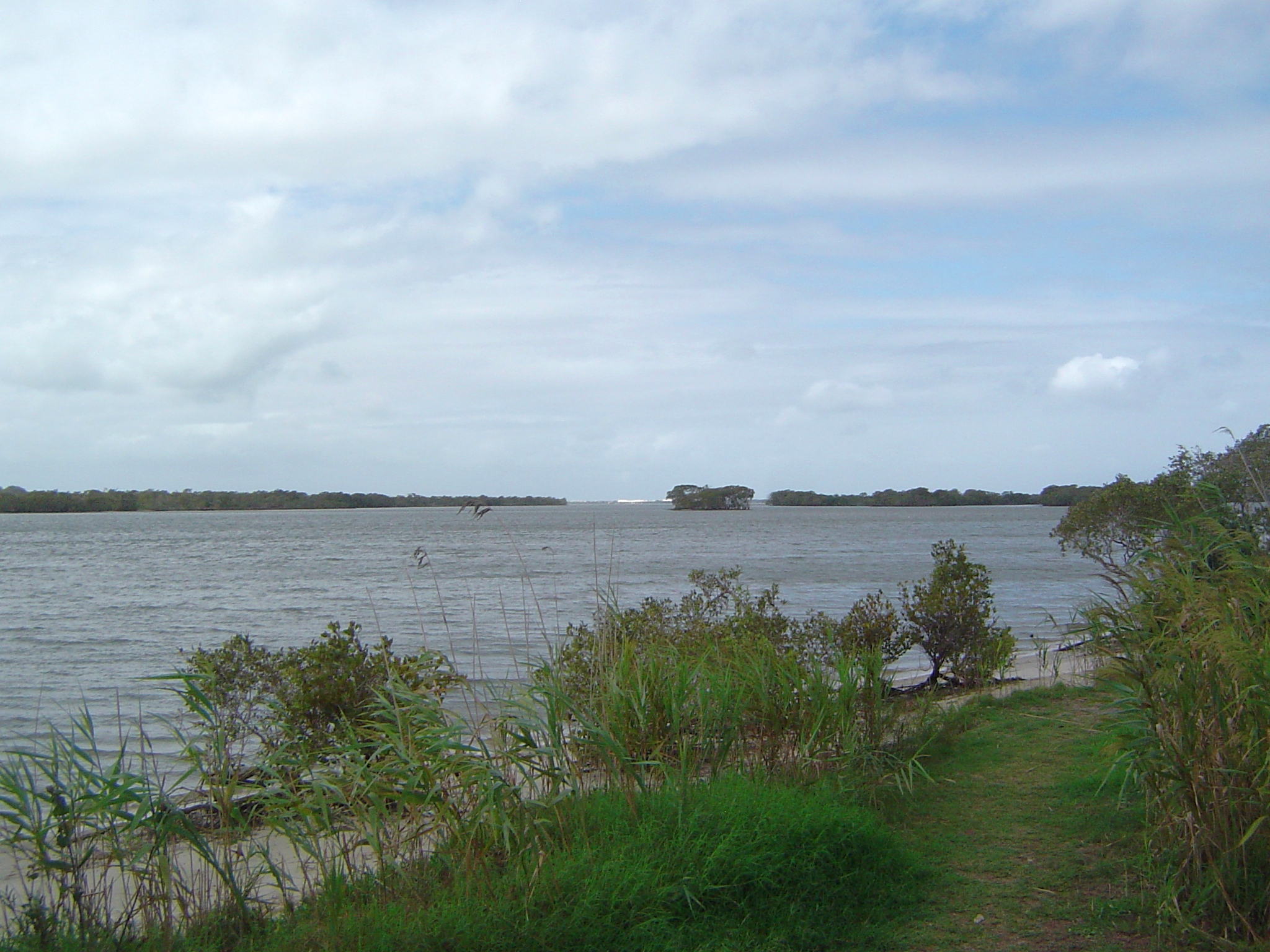
Kangaroo Island and Tipplers Passage near Jacobs Well, 2014

There are nine types of designated areas in the marine park. These areas have been set aside so that specific issues that occur at specific locations can be properly managed. Examples of designated areas include Go slow areas to protect dugongs and turtles, No anchoring areas to protect sensitive reefs and Grey nurse shark areas designed to conserve the endangered shark species.

== See also ==
- Moreton Island National Park
- Protected areas of Queensland
