= Coomera, Queensland =

Coomera
- Town
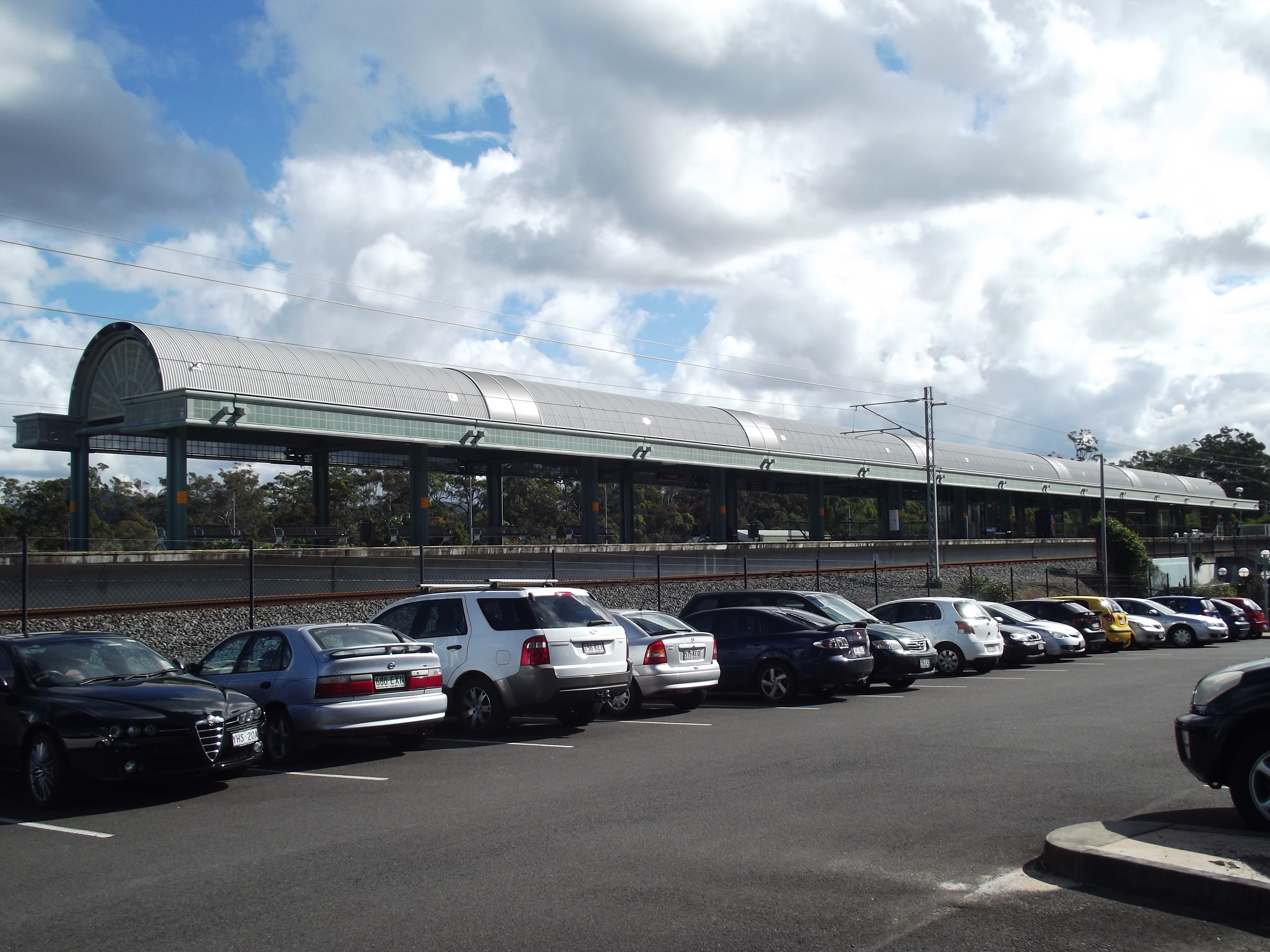
- Coomera Railway Station

- Interactive map of Coomera
- Coordinates: 27.8722°S 153.3147°E
- Country: Australia
- State: Queensland
- City: Gold Coast
- LGA: City of Gold Coast
- Location: 23.8 km (14.8 mi) N of Southport; 27.0 km (16.8 mi) N of Surfers Paradise; 57.7 km (35.9 mi) SE of Brisbane CBD; 52.9 km (32.9 mi) NW of Tweed Heads

Government
  - State electorates: Coomera; Theodore
  - Federal division: Fadden

Area
  - Total: 24.6 km^{2} (9.5 sq mi)
- Elevation: 10 m (33 ft)

Population
  - Total: 20,225 (2021 census)
  - Density: 822.2/km^{2} (2,129/sq mi)
- Time zone: UTC+10:00 (AEST)
- Postcode: 4209
Localities around Coomera
Pimpama	Pimpama	Southern Moreton Bay Islands
Upper Coomera	Coomera	Hope Island
Oxenford	Helensvale	Hope Island

Coomera (/kuːmərə/) is a town and suburb in the City of Gold Coast, Queensland, Australia. In the 2021 census, the suburb of Coomera had a population of 20,225 people.

== Geography ==
Located next to the Pacific Motorway, Coomera is close to Pimpama, Helensvale, Willow Vale, Oxenford, and Upper Coomera. The southern boundary of Coomera is aligned with the Coomera River. Coomera is situated slightly inland from the coast line and is also near the Gold Coast hinterland.

=== Climate ===
Coomera has a humid subtropical climate (Cfa) with hot, humid summers and mild to cool dry winters. Due to its inland location, it is slightly cooler than the coastal area of Gold Coast.

Climate data for Logan City (23 km north)
Month	Jan	Feb	Mar	Apr	May	Jun	Jul	Aug	Sep	Oct	Nov	Dec	Year
Record high °C (°F)	41.9 (107.4)	41.0 (105.8)	38.9 (102.0)	33.4 (92.1)	31.1 (88.0)	29.3 (84.7)	29.3 (84.7)	34.3 (93.7)	38.4 (101.1)	37.7 (99.9)	40.7 (105.3)	40.1 (104.2)	41.9 (107.4)
Mean daily maximum °C (°F)	29.9 (85.8)	29.5 (85.1)	28.5 (83.3)	26.4 (79.5)	24.1 (75.4)	21.6 (70.9)	21.5 (70.7)	22.8 (73.0)	25.1 (77.2)	26.5 (79.7)	27.9 (82.2)	29.1 (84.4)	26.1 (79.0)
Mean daily minimum °C (°F)	20.6 (69.1)	20.5 (68.9)	19.2 (66.6)	16.1 (61.0)	12.6 (54.7)	10.2 (50.4)	8.8 (47.8)	9.4 (48.9)	12.5 (54.5)	15.0 (59.0)	17.4 (63.3)	19.3 (66.7)	15.1 (59.2)
Record low °C (°F)	13.4 (56.1)	15.0 (59.0)	12.4 (54.3)	7.8 (46.0)	2.5 (36.5)	2.0 (35.6)	−0.5 (31.1)	0.8 (33.4)	4.4 (39.9)	7.8 (46.0)	8.5 (47.3)	11.8 (53.2)	−0.5 (31.1)
Average precipitation mm (inches)	126.4 (4.98)	153.1 (6.03)	134.3 (5.29)	80.2 (3.16)	99.3 (3.91)	74.8 (2.94)	34.0 (1.34)	44.8 (1.76)	40.1 (1.58)	69.3 (2.73)	102.3 (4.03)	122.1 (4.81)	1,086.5 (42.78)
Average precipitation days	13.1	14.5	15.2	11.9	10.7	9.6	8.2	7.3	8.2	9.2	11.8	12.0	131.7
Average relative humidity (%)	64	65	63	61	59	57	53	52	52	57	61	61	59

== History ==
Yugembah (also known as Yugumbir, Jugambel, Jugambeir, Jugumbir, Jukam, Jukamba) is one of the Australian Aboriginal languages in areas that include the Beenleigh, Beaudesert, Gold Coast, Logan, Scenic Rim, Albert River, Coolangatta, Coomera, Logan River, Pimpama, Tamborine and Tweed River Valley, within the local government boundaries of the City of Gold Coast, City of Logan, Scenic Rim Regional Council and the Tweed River Valley.

The town takes its name from the Coomera River, which in turn takes its name comes from the Indigenous word kumera, a species of wattle. The bark of this tree was used by Aboriginal people to stupefy fish.

Coomera Provisional School opened on 11 July 1873. On 20 June 1874, it became Coomera State School. From 1877, it was known as Coomera Lower State School (sometimes Lower Coomera State School) until 1899 when it returned to the name Coomera State School.

Coomera Wesleyan Methodist Church opened on Sunday 17 May 1874. When the Methodist Church amalgamated into the Uniting Church in Australia in 1977, it became the Coomera Uniting Church. On 11 November 2017, the Uniting North Church decided to amalgamate with the Coomera Church creating the Uniting North Coomera Church.

The Dreamworld theme park was officially opened on 15 December 1981 by the Premier of Queensland of the time, Sir Joh Bjelke-Petersen.

Circa 1980s, Coomera was home to a theme park and wildlife park called Koala Town which closed in the early 1990s. The site is currently occupied by residential land on Koala Town Road.

Coomera Rivers State School opened on 1 January 2011; it was originally proposed to call it Coomera East State School.

Picnic Creek State School opened in 2018.

Westfield Coomera opened on 11 October 2018.

The Coomera Sport and Leisure Centre in Beattie Road hosted the gymnastics and netball finals in the 2018 Commonwealth Games.

St Joseph's College was established in January 2019 by the Brisbane Catholic Education Office with 250 students enrolled in Years Prep-4 and Year 7.

Foxwell State Secondary College opened in January 2020.

Coomera State Special School opened in February 2020.

== Demographics ==
In the 2016 census, the suburb of Coomera had a population of 13,305 people. Aboriginal and Torres Strait Islander people made up 2.5% of the population. 63.3% of people were born in Australia. The next most common countries of birth were New Zealand 12.0%, England 5.7%, South Africa 2.6% and Philippines 0.8%. 83.9% of people spoke only English at home. Other languages spoken at home included Mandarin 0.8% and Afrikaans 0.8%. The most common responses for religion were No Religion 36.2%, Catholic 18.8% and Anglican 15.2%.

In the 2021 census, the suburb of Coomera had a population of 20,225 people.

== Heritage listings ==
Coomera has a heritage site:

- Coomera River Bridge built over the Coomera River in 1930

== Education ==
Coomera State School is a government primary (Early Childhood to Year 6) school for boys and girls at Dreamworld Parkway (27.8686°S 153.3152°E). In 2017, the school had an enrolment of 775 students with 65 teachers (58 full-time equivalent) and 31 non-teaching staff (22 full-time equivalent). It includes a special education program. The school has run the Australian Primary Schools Film Festival since 2001.

Coomera Rivers State School is a government primary (Prep–6) school for boys and girls at 81–87 Finnegan Way (27.8455°S 153.3276°E). In 2017, the school had an enrolment of 1,372 students with 86 teachers (82 full-time equivalent) and 48 non-teaching staff (33 full-time equivalent). It includes a special education program.

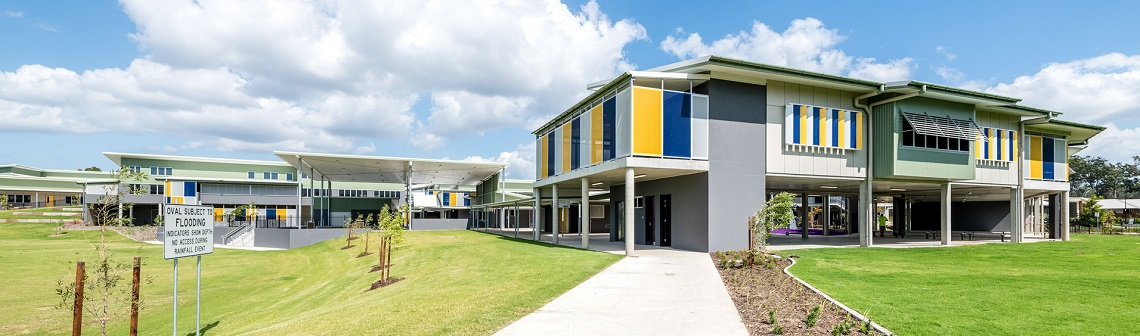
Picnic Creek State School, 2025

Picnic Creek State School is a government primary (Prep–6) school at 25 Edwardson Drive (27.8399°S 153.3387°E). In 2024, it had an enrolment of 939 students with 69 teachers (63 full-time equivalent) and 40 non-teaching staff (29 full-time equivalent). It includes a special education program.

Coomera State Special School is a special government primary and secondary (P–12) school at 9 Galaxy Drive (27.8485°S 153.3416°E). It opened in February 2020.

St Joseph's College is a Catholic primary and secondary school (Prep to Year 12).

Foxwell State Secondary College is a government secondary school, which opened in 2020.

== Amenities ==
The Gold Coast City Council operates a fortnightly mobile library service which visits Ragamuffin Drive near Sandy Bay.

The Coomera branch of the Queensland Country Women's Association meets at the 161 Maudsland Road in Oxenford.

Uniting North Coomera Church is at 6-8 Esplanade (27.8756°S 153.3162°E).

== Sport and recreation ==
A number of well-known sporting teams represent the local area, including the Coomera Cutters is the local rugby league club who play home games at Coomera Sports Park and the Coomera Colts Soccer Club and Coomera Magpies Australian Football Club.
