= Gaven, Queensland =

Gaven Queensland
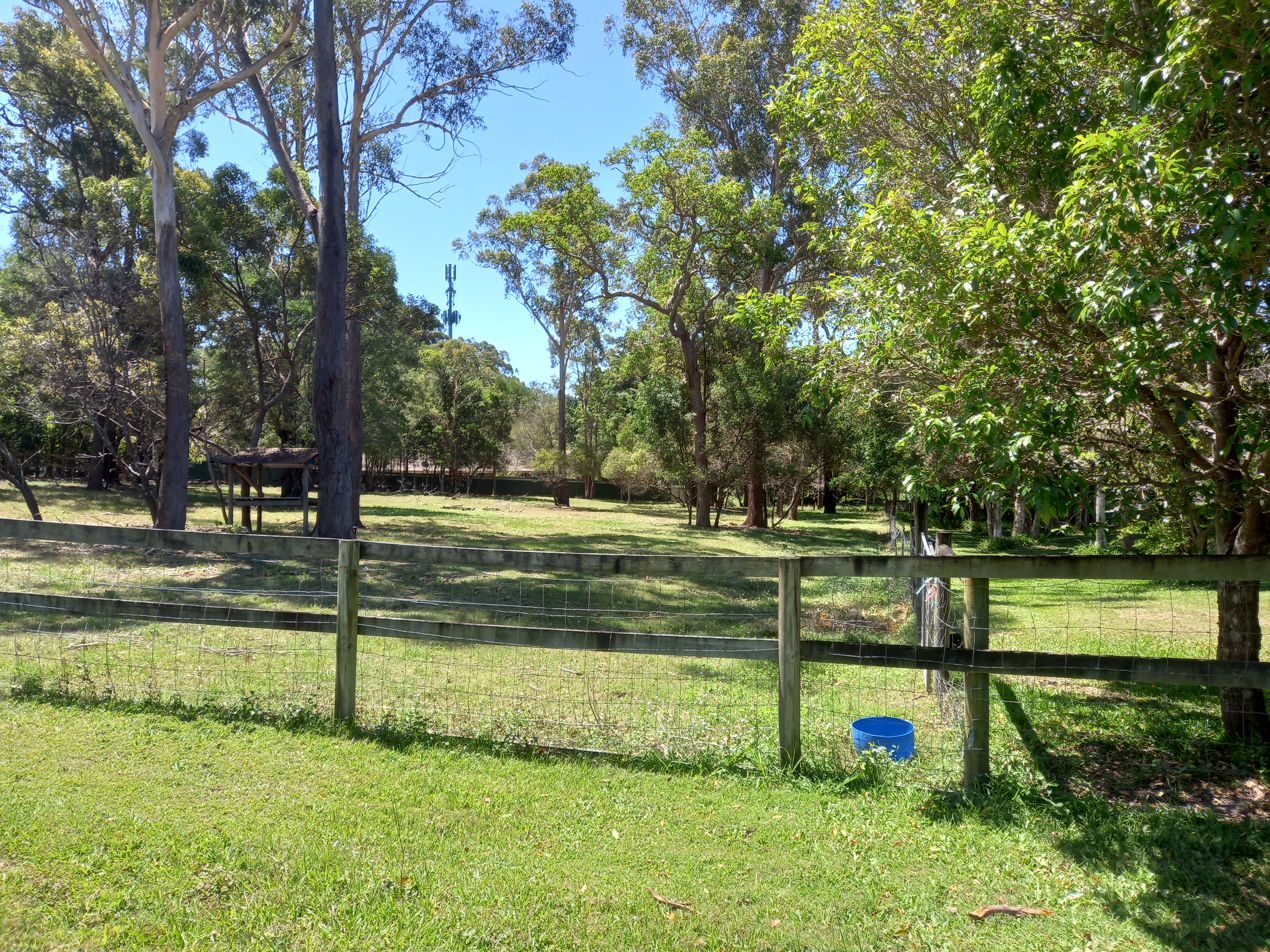
- Cockatoo Court, 2022

- Coordinates: 27.9536°S 153.3352°E
- Population: 1,638 (2021 census)
  - Density: 244.5/km^{2} (633/sq mi)
- Postcode(s): 4211
- Area: 6.7 km^{2} (2.6 sq mi)
- Time zone: AEST (UTC+10:00)
- Location: 11.1 km (7 mi) NW of Southport; 13.9 km (9 mi) NW of Surfers Paradise; 67.5 km (42 mi) SSE of Brisbane
- LGA(s): City of Gold Coast
- State electorate(s): Gaven
- Federal division(s): Fadden
Suburbs around Gaven:
Pacific Pines	Oxenford	Helensvale
Nerang	Gaven	Arundel
Nerang	Nerang	Molendinar

Gaven (/ˈɡeɪvən/ GAY-vən) is a rural residential locality in the City of Gold Coast, Queensland, Australia. In the 2021 census, Gaven had a population of 1,638 people.

== Geography ==
The locality is immediately north of Nerang. The eastern boundary of the suburb is marked by the Pacific Motorway.

== History ==
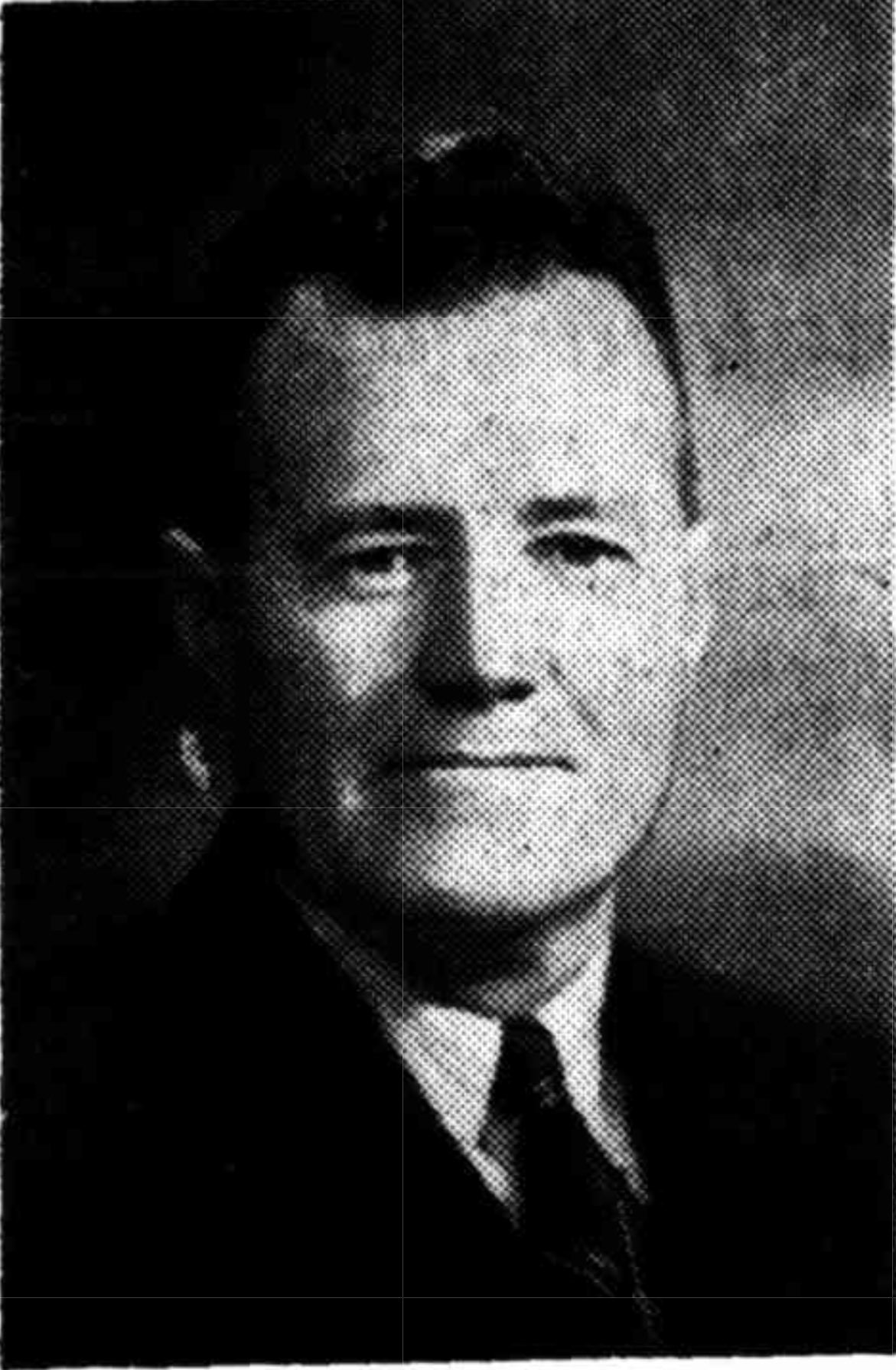
Eric Gaven, 1950

It was named after Eric Gaven, a councillor on the Nerang Shire Council from 1935 to 1949 and chairman of the newly-established Albert Shire Council in 1949-1950. He won the seat of Southport at the 1950 Queensland state election for the Country Party. He held the seat for 10 years before it was abolished for the 1960 Queensland state election and Gaven then won the new seat of South Coast, which he held until 1966.

Gaven State School opened on 27 January 1995 but is now within the boundaries of neighbouring Oxenford.

== Demographics ==
In the 2011 census, Gaven had a population of 1,583 people.

In the 2016 census, Gaven had a population of 1,558 people.

In the 2021 census, Gaven had a population of 1,638 people.

== Education ==
There are no schools in Gaven. The nearest government primary schools are Pacific Pines State School in neighbouring Pacific Pines to the north-west, Arundel State School in neighbouring Arundel to the east, and the Nerang State School in neighbouring Nerang to the south. The nearest government secondary schools are Pacific Pines State High School in Pacific Pines and Nerang State High School in Nerang.
