= Pacific Pines, Queensland =

Pacific Pines
- Suburb
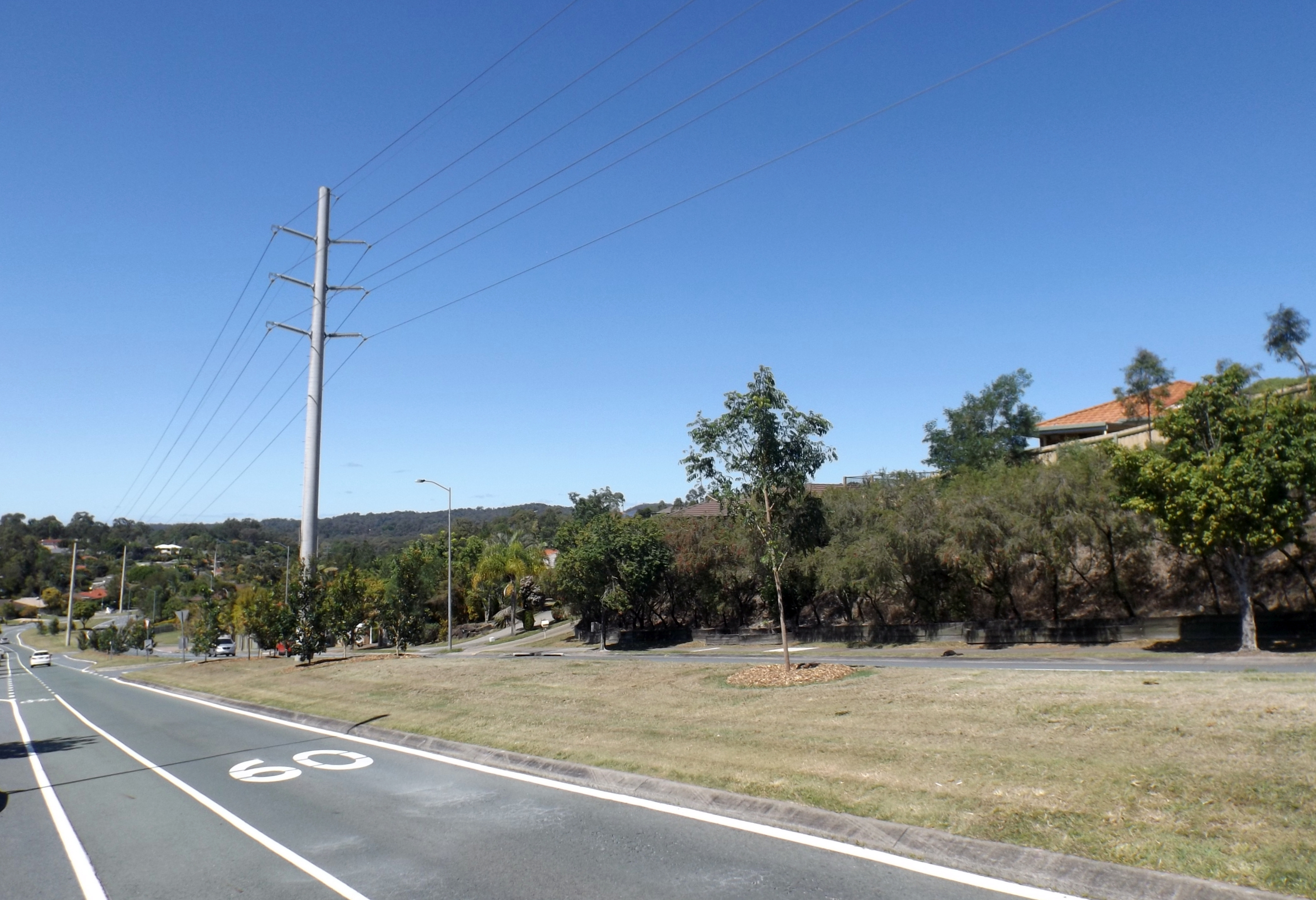
- Pacific Pines Boulevard, 2015

- Interactive map of Pacific Pines
- Coordinates: 27.9402°S 153.3166°E
- Country: Australia
- State: Queensland
- City: Gold Coast
- LGA: City of Gold Coast
- Location: 12.8 km (8.0 mi) WNW of Southport; 16.0 km (9.9 mi) NW of Surfers Paradise; 66.4 km (41.3 mi) SSE of Brisbane
- Established: 1994

Government
  - State electorates: Gaven; Theodore
  - Federal divisions: Fadden; Wright

Area
  - Total: 9.2 km^{2} (3.6 sq mi)

Population
  - Total: 16,664 (2021 census)
  - Density: 1,811/km^{2} (4,691/sq mi)
- Time zone: UTC+10:00 (AEST)
- Postcode: 4211
Suburbs around Pacific Pines
Oxenford	Oxenford	Gaven
Maudsland	Pacific Pines	Gaven
Nerang	Nerang	Gaven

Pacific Pines is a northern suburb in the City of Gold Coast, Queensland, Australia. In the 2021 census, Pacific Pines had a population of 16,664 people.

== Geography ==
Pacific Pines is located between the Pacific Motorway (M1) and the north-north-east side of the Nerang State Forest.

== History ==
In 1990, Stockland bought 800 hectares (2,000 acres) of land and designed it as a residential area with the capacity for 5,800 house lots.

On 9 September 1994, Pacific Pines was gazetted as a neighbourhood within the suburb of Gaven. The name Pacific Pines was proposed by the land developer. It became a separate suburb on 7 February 2003.

Pacific Pines State High School opened on 1 January 2000.

Jubilee Primary School opened in January 2001.

Pacific Pines State School opened on 1 January 2002.

Park Lake State School opened on 1 January 2008 with an initial enrolment of 212 students.

== Demographics ==
In the 2016 census, Pacific Pines had a population of 16,757 people. Of these 49.0% were male and 51.0% were female. Aboriginal and/or Torres Strait Islander people made up 1.7% of the population. The median age of people in Pacific Pines was 31 years. Children aged 0–14 years made up 26.0% of the population and people aged 65 years and over made up 6.4% of the population. The most common ancestries in Pacific Pines were English 28.7%, Australian 22.5%, Scottish 6.8%, Irish 6.7% and Maori 3.4%.

In the 2021 census, Pacific Pines had a population of 16,664 people.

== Education ==
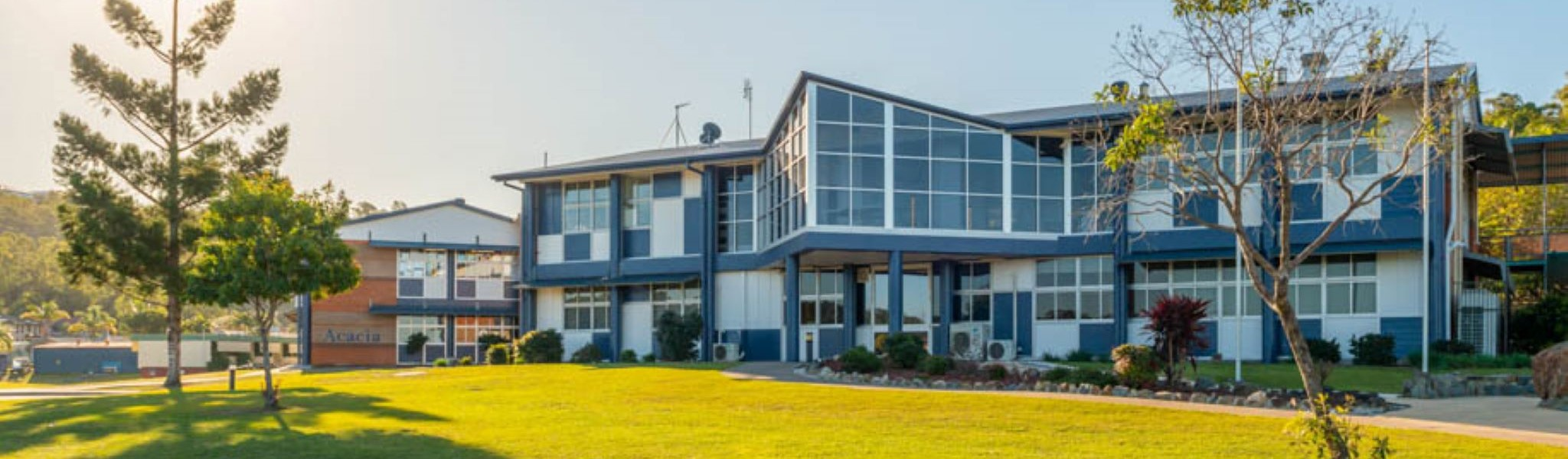
Pacific Pines State School, 2024

Pacific Pines State School is a government primary (Prep–6) school for boys and girls on Santa Isobel Boulevard (27.9399°S 153.3202°E). In 2017, the school had an enrolment of 949 students with 69 teachers (62 full-time equivalent) and 34 non-teaching staff (24 full-time equivalent). It includes a special education program.

Park Lake State School is a government primary (Prep–6) school for boys and girls at 1 Shoalhaven Avenue (27.9368°S 153.3028°E). In 2017, the school had an enrolment of 992 students with 68 teachers (62 full-time equivalent) and 33 non-teaching staff (23 full-time equivalent). It includes a special education program.

Jubilee Primary School is a Catholic primary (Prep–6) school for boys and girls at 34 Manra Way (27.9279°S 153.3158°E). In 2017, the school had an enrolment of 593 students with 41 teachers (35 full-time equivalent) and 21 non-teaching staff (14 full-time equivalent).

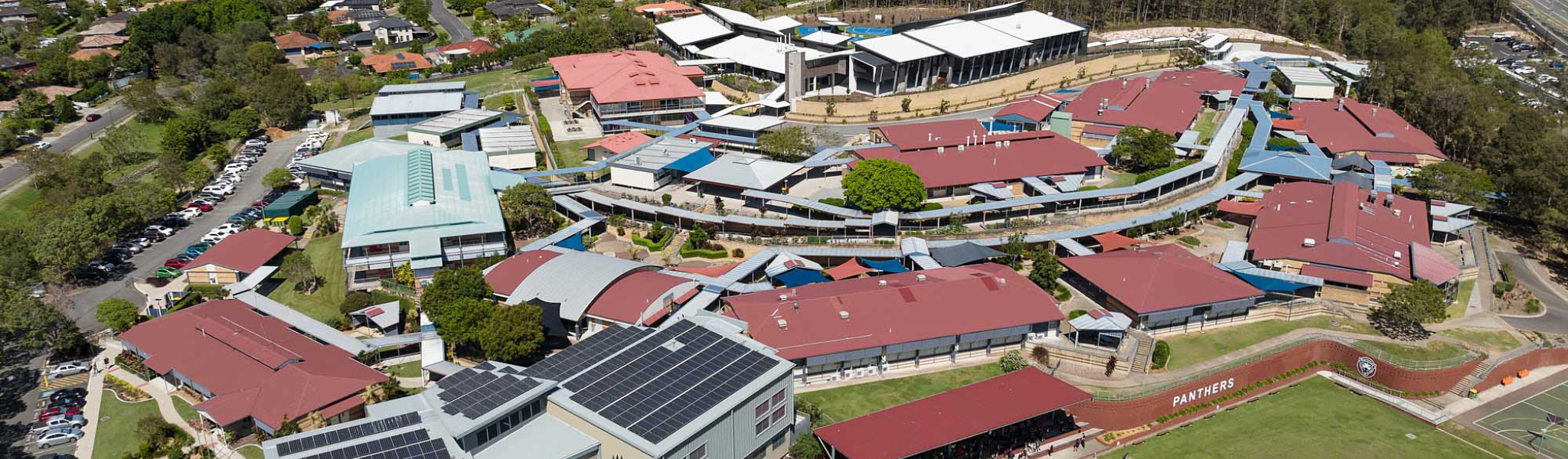
Pacific Pines State High School, 2024

Pacific Pines State High School is a government secondary (7–12) school for boys and girls at Archipelago Street (27.9431°S 153.3206°E). In 2017, the school had an enrolment of 1,377 students with 103 teachers (100 full-time equivalent) and 50 non-teaching staff (36 full-time equivalent). It includes a special education program.

== Amenities ==
Pacific Pines is home of the Pacific Pines Panthers Basketball Club. The Panthers opened their doors in 2013 and represent age groups from under 9 to under 20. They fall under the Gold Coast City Regional Basketball Association.

A range of public amenities are available including a community hall, cricket fields, netball, AFL and tennis courts, parks (including half basketball courts), skate parks and two off leash dog parks.
