= Westfield Helensvale =

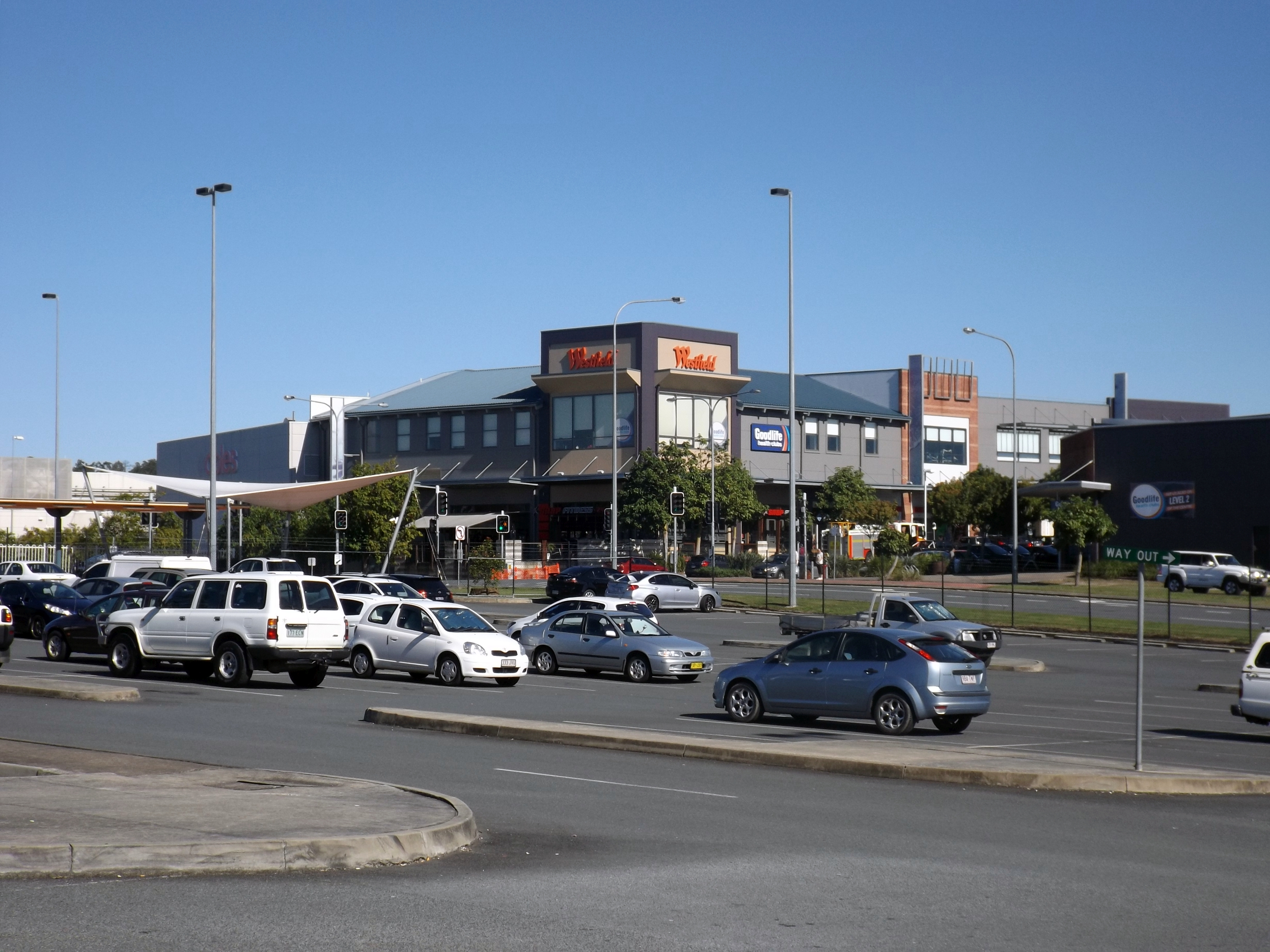
- Shopping centre as seen from the north
- Location: Helensvale, Gold Coast, Queensland, Australia
- Coordinates: 27.926425°S 153.336155°E
- Opened: 13 October 2005; 21 years ago
- Developer: Scentre Group
- Manager: Scentre Group
- Owner: Scentre Group (50%); IP Generation (50%)
- Num. of stores: 239
- Num. of anchor tenants: Kmart; Target; Coles; Woolworths; Aldi
- Floors: 2
- Website: westfield.com.au/helensvale

Westfield Helensvale is a shopping centre in Helensvale on the Gold Coast, Queensland, Australia. It opened in 2005.

It was the first Westfield on the Gold Coast and includes Coles, Kmart, Aldi, Target and Woolworths (which was refurbished in December 2023) as majors as well as a food court with McDonald's, KFC and Subway. It also provides optimum access to Helensvale station.

When approval for construction of the centre was requested by Westfield, it was suggested that the Helensvale location was too close to existing centres at Southport (Australia Fair) and Runaway Bay (Runaway Bay Shopping Village). The Gold Coast City Council argued that the planned Westfield Coomera (about 5 kilometres (3.1 mi) up the M1) would cater for the catchment. Westfield Helensvale was built mainly because Coomera Town Centre, which is planned to be the true heart of the region, was hitting obstacles in the ways of planning. Part of the outcome of that debate was that part of the Westfield Centre was meant to have the appearance of an outdoor shopping street connecting the train station through to the older Helensvale shops nearby. However, since the older shops are located across a major road they have been refurbished for local shopping. The Westfield Helensvale shopping centre has predominantly mall enclosed shopping and only a few shops open to outside traffic. Many other Westfield shopping centres conversely are often fully enclosed malls, however the company is redeveloping a number of sites (such as Garden City) to include outdoor, piazza style areas.

In April 2022, the Queensland Investment Corporation sold its 50% shareholding to IP Generation.

== Parking and transport ==
Westfield Helensvale has 2,000 car parking spaces, all of which are free. The shopping centre is adjacent to Helensvale railway station, which is serviced by Kinetic Gold Coast bus services and Queensland Rail services to local areas and Brisbane.
