= Saltwater Creek (Gold Coast) =

Coordinates: 27°54′11″S 153°19′04″E

Location
- Country: Australia

Physical characteristics
- Mouth
  - location: Stradbroke Islands
- Length: 17 km (11 mi)

Saltwater Creek is a creek on the Gold Coast, Queensland, Australia. It flows from the Nerang National Park to Coombabah Creek which eventually goes out to the Coral Sea. The creek is crossed by the Gold Coast railway line.

== Geography ==
"Saltwater Creek is a small micro-tidal estuary in the Gold Coast region of Australia. The creek system is approximately 17 km long, flowing from its head headwaters in the Nerang State Forest to the Coombabah Creek estuary confluence which connects to the Coomera River. Its tidal limit is 10.5 km. It is also connected to Coomera River via an anabranch 6.5 km upstream from the confluence. The average width of Saltwater Creek is 30 m with the depth for the first 3 km typically 3 m (below MSL) with the remainder of the creek typically 1 m.

The two canal estates adjacent to Sites 8 and 11 (see Figure 2) are connected to Saltwater Creek by navigation locks, which restrict tidal exchange between themselves and Saltwater Creek." (Webster and Lemckert, 2002)

== Threats ==
The main threat to Saltwater Creek (especially near the source) is the pollution and the poor water quality. The cause of pollution in the Saltwater Creek is civilians around the area dumping unwanted rubbish such as: tires, parts of automobiles and real estate boards. Currently, no plan is in action to stop this.

== See also ==
- List of rivers of Australia
