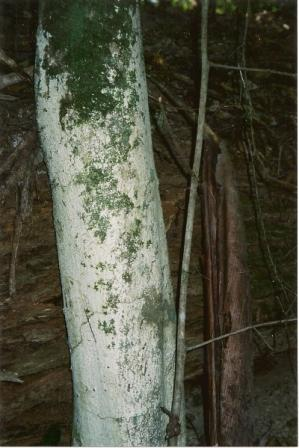

Conservation status
- Endangered (EPBC Act)

Scientific classification
- Kingdom: Plantae
- Clade: Tracheophytes
- Clade: Angiosperms
- Clade: Magnoliids
- Order: Laurales
- Family: Lauraceae
- Genus: Endiandra
- Species: E. floydii

Binomial name
- Endiandra floydii B.Hyland

= Endiandra floydii =

Species of tree

Endiandra floydii is a small-sized rainforest tree. Despite its common name, Crystal Creek walnut, this tree is unrelated to northern-hemisphere walnuts, and is a laurel. It is named after the Australian botanist, Alexander Floyd.

== Habitat ==
The Crystal Creek walnut is restricted to paleozoic metamorphics but with overlying basalt soils in the Mount Warning area of New South Wales, and a couple of adjacent areas in Queensland. The Crystal Creek walnut grows in rainforest and is also found as an understorey plant in brush box ecotone areas, on moderately steep slopes no higher than 430 metres above sea level.

The Crystal Creek walnut is considered endangered, with a ROTAP rating of 2E.

== Description ==
A small tree, often with coppice shoots at the base. New leaves pinkish brown. The bark is pale to dark grey. Leaves are elliptic to narrow-elliptic, 5–15 cm long, 2–5 cm wide.

Small creamy green flowers form in autumn. The large fruit matures in summer, the size of an apple or a pear. Being red to purplish black when ripe. Germination is not particularly slow and quite reliable.

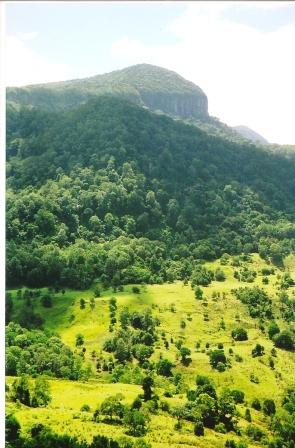
habitat of Endiandra floydii, NSW - Qld border

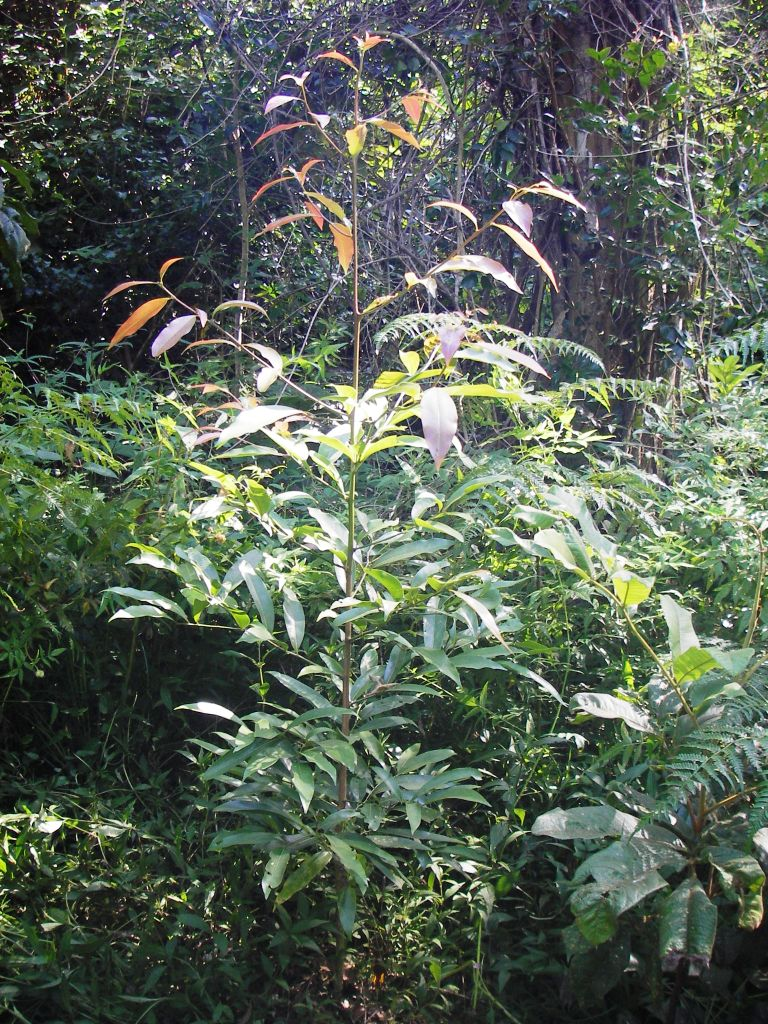
juvenile Endiandra floydii

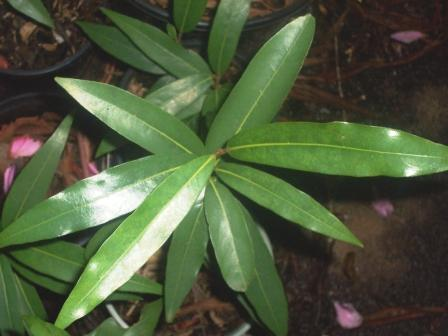
Endiandra floydii - leaves
