= Coombabah Lake Conservation Park =

Protected area in Queensland, Australia

- IUCN category III (natural monument or feature)
- Location within Queensland
- Location: Queensland
- Nearest city: Brisbane
- Coordinates: 27°54′34″S 153°21′7″E
- Area: 1,959 ha (7.56 sq mi)
- Established: 1997
- Governing body: Gold Coast City Council (tourism); Queensland National Parks and Wildlife Service (national and marine parks); Department of Primary Industries and Fisheries (fish habitat areas and intertidal zones); Department of Transport (marine infrastructure and passageways); Department of Natural Resources and Mines waterways and leased land); Environmental Protection Agency (sewerage treatment plant licenses, pollution issues, coastal plans, dredging licenses, and the Ramsar area)
- Website: www.environment.gov.au/cgi-bin/wetlands/report.pl?smode=DOIW&doiw_refcodelist=QLD194

The Coombabah Lake Conservation Park is a conservation park that is an Important Wetland in Australia, located in the Gold Coast region of South East Queensland, Australia. Part of the Coomera River catchment, Lake Coombabah is a tidal lake at the mouth of Coombabah Creek. The Coombabah wetlands are significant because they are the most southerly lake and coastal swampland representatives in the bioregion, and because the area provides significant wildlife value and refuge habitat. The conservation area includes tidal marshlands and mangroves along part of the lakes edge. The Melaleuca boardwalk allows viewing of the wildlife. The mangroves are home to frogs, crabs and fish that attract native and migratory birds. There are guided bushwalking and canoeing activities as part of community conservation and environmental workshops to promote local conservation.

== Location and features ==
Situated near the suburb of Coombabah, 5 kilometres (3.1 mi) from the coast and 8 kilometres (5.0 mi) northwest of Southport, the lake borders the Ivan Gibbs Wetland Reserve, is classified as a Fish Habitat Area within the Moreton Bay Marine Park and serves as an important wildlife corridor between the Nerang State Forest and the coast.

The lake is fed by Coombabah Creek which rises to the west in the Nerang Forest Reserve. The Ivan Gibbs Wetlands Reserve and Lakeside Country Club golf course are both located to the south of the lake. Houses in Helensvale have been built a short distance from the lake's western shore.

The Park safeguards close to 1200 hectares of wetland, eucalypt forest, mangrove habitat and salt marsh and acts as habitat for migratory birds. It has many endangered species of animals including grey-headed flying fox, koalas, powerful owl and various internationally protected migratory birds.

== See also ==
- Protected areas of Queensland
- Moreton Bay Marine Park
