= Alexander Floyd =

Australian botanist (1926–2022)

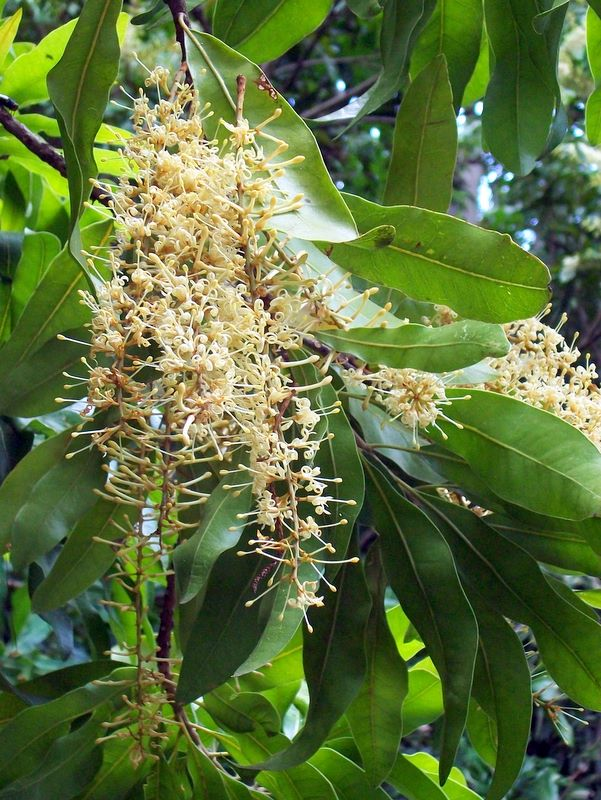
- The genus Floydia is named after Alexander Floyd.
- Born: 1 April 1926; Hampton, Victoria, Australia
- Died: 12 December 2022 (aged 96)
- Known for: Rainforest botany
- Scientific career
- Fields: Botany
- Author abbrev. (botany): A.G.Floyd

Alexander Geoffrey Floyd OAM (1 April 1926 – 12 December 2022) was an Australian botanist with an expert knowledge of rainforest plants, particularly the rainforest trees of New South Wales. He has worked with the New South Wales Forestry Commission, the Department of Forestry in Papua-New Guinea, and the National Parks and Wildlife Service of New South Wales. He helped create the North Coast Regional Botanic Garden at Coffs Harbour. Two genera and several species of plants are named in his honour; including Floydia, Alexfloydia, and Endiandra floydii.

Floyd died on 12 December 2022, at the age of 96.

== Honours and awards ==
In 2008, Floyd was awarded the Medal of the Order of Australia "for service to botany, particularly through research and identification of sub-tropical rainforest plants and through support for the North Coast Regional Botanic Gardens, and to conservation and environmental education."

Floyd has generally published as A. G. Floyd or Alexander G. Floyd. The standard author abbreviation A.G.Floyd is used to indicate this person as the author when citing a botanical name.
