= GoldlinQ =

Tram operator on the Gold Coast, Australia

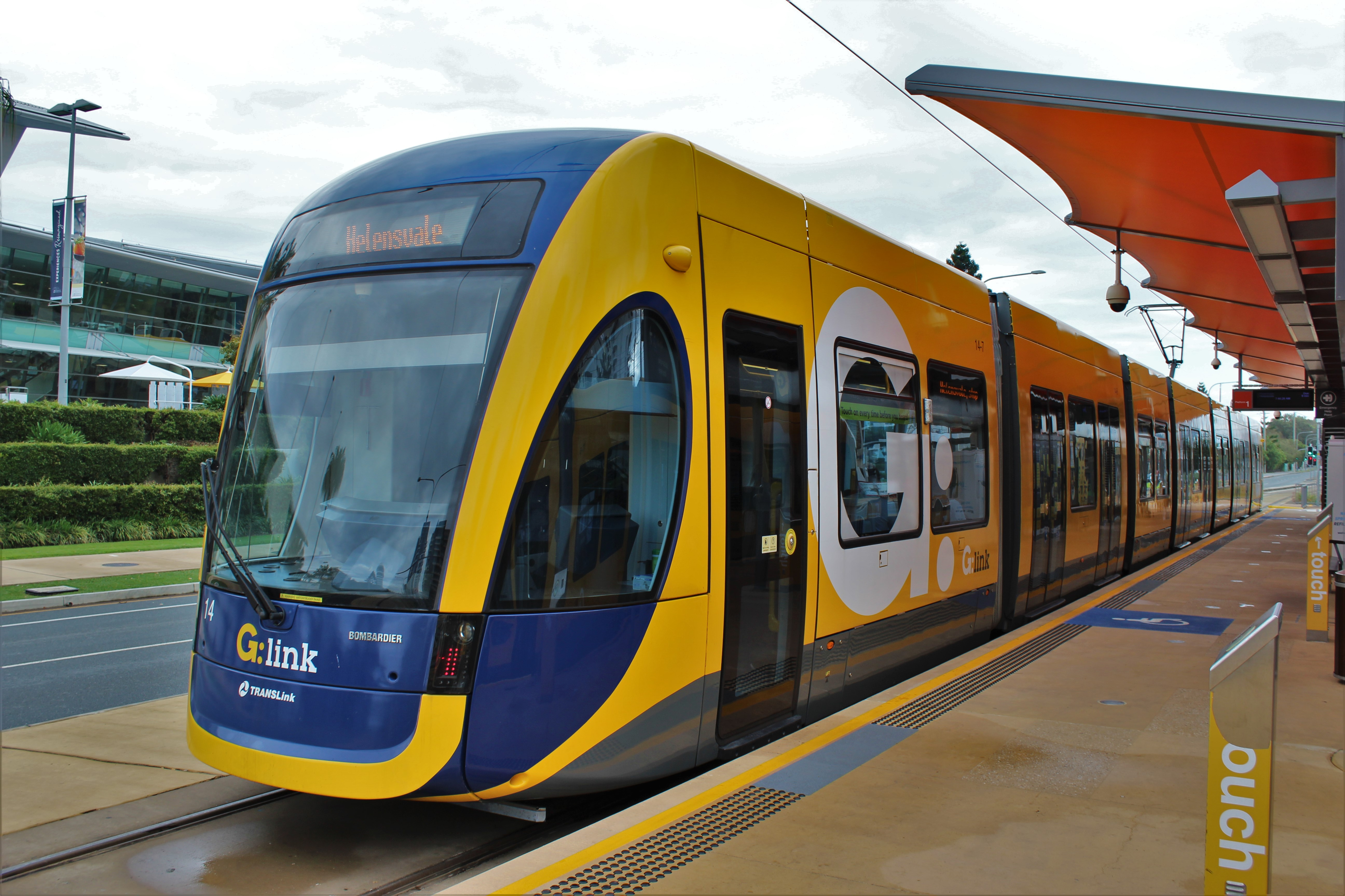
- GoldlinQ-operated Flexity 2 light rail vehicle
- Industry: Transportation company
- Founded: 2010; 16 years ago
- Headquarters: Broadbeach, Queensland
- Area served: Gold Coast, Queensland
- Key people: Derek Leys (CEO)
- Website: goldlinq.com.au

GoldlinQ (pronounced "Gold-link") is the consortium that owns and operates the G:link light rail line on the Gold Coast, Queensland. The consortium was founded in 2010 and operates as a public private partnership with the Queensland Government. It is responsible for building, maintaining and operating the light rail system.

The consortium is currently composed of investment firms Palisade, Marubeni, International Public Partnerships and Plenary Group, as well as operator Keolis.

== History ==
GoldlinQ was founded in 2010 to bid for the construction and operations contract of the new Gold Coast light rail system. It was founded as a consortium between Keolis Downer, McConnell Dowell, Bombardier Transportation and Plenary Group.

In May 2010, it was announced that GoldlinQ was a finalist for the contract, alongside two other consortiums (GC Connect and Move GC). One year later, the Queensland Government announced that GoldlinQ was the successful bidder for the project, awarding it an 18-year contract for construction and maintenance of the project.

GoldlinQ and the Queensland Government entered into a new contract in April 2016, with the goal of extending the light rail to Helensvale railway station by the 2018 Commonwealth Games. This new agreement was the first public private partnership to be an expansion on an existing project. Despite holding the construction contract, GoldlinQ partnered with CPB Contractors to build this extension.

In July 2021, GoldlinQ – now composed of investment firms Palisade, Marubeni, International Public Partnerships and Plenary Group, as well as Keolis Downer – signed a further contract to construct an extension to Burleigh Heads. For this extension, GoldlinQ partnered with John Holland for construction.

Following the opening of the Stage 3 light rail extension to Burleigh Heads in August 2026, Phil Mumford stepped down as GoldlinQ CEO and was succeeded by Derek Leys. Mumford will oversee the establishment of the branch line extension to Biggera Waters, which is expected to be completed before the start of the Brisbane Olympics in July 2032.

== Operations ==
Keolis Australia, an owner of GoldlinQ, is responsible for operations and maintenance of the G:link system.

=== Depot ===
The 23 Alstom Flexity 2 light rail vehicles operated by GoldlinQ are stored at the Southport light rail depot. The depot is also home to maintenance, signalling and cleaning facilities.

GoldlinQ also own an office in Broadbeach, which is located near the Broadbeach North light rail station.
