= INPP =

INPP can mean:

- International Public Partnerships, an investment company
- International Network for Philosophy and Psychiatry
- Ignalina Nuclear Power Plant
- Inn National Progressive Party, Myanmar
- Inositol-polyphosphate in chemistry (e.g. in INPP5E)
