= G:link =

Light rail system on the Gold Coast, Australia

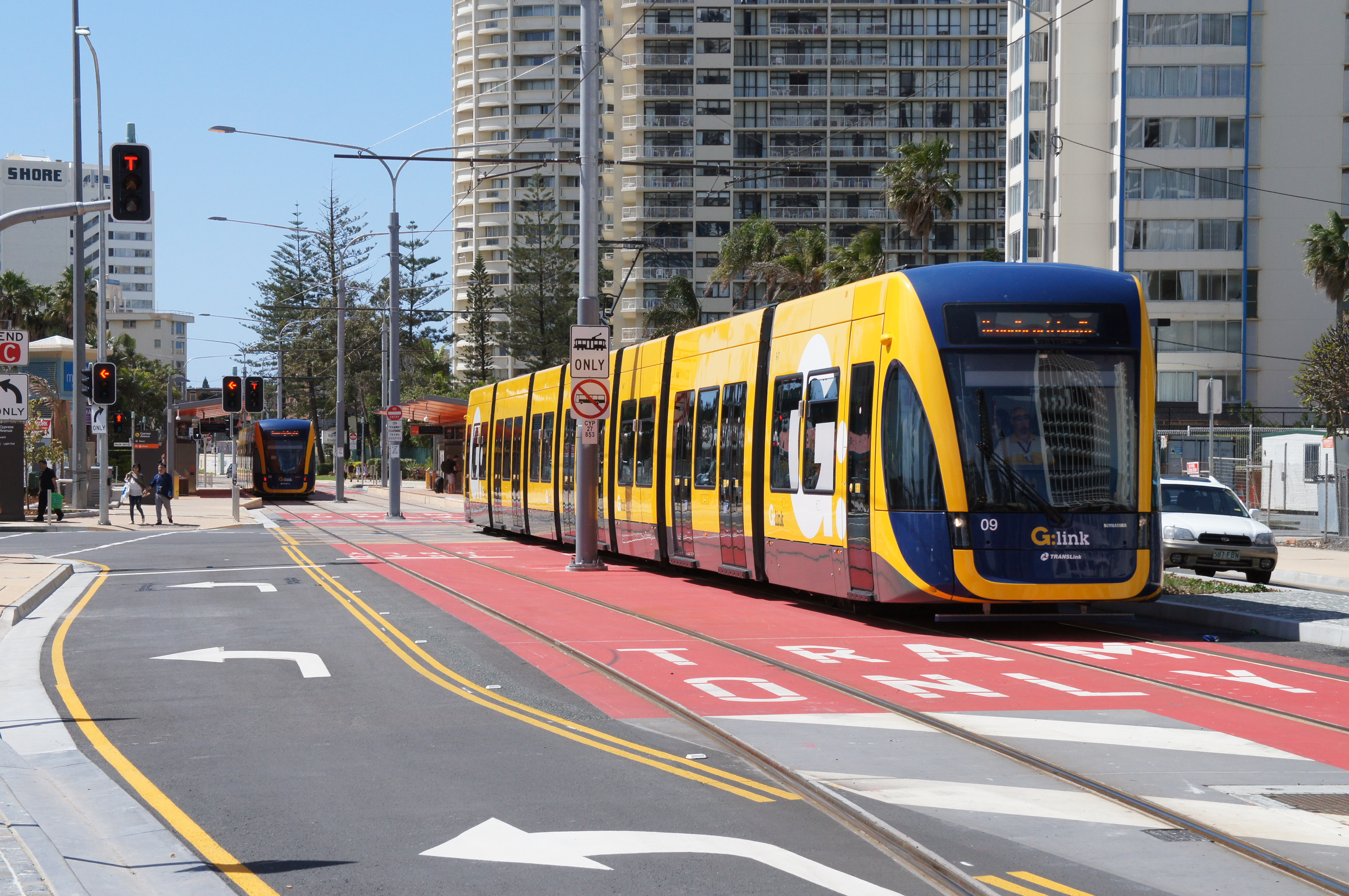
- Flexity 2 trams at Cypress Avenue in 2014

Overview
- Owner: GoldlinQ
- Line number: L1
- Locale: Gold Coast, Queensland, Australia
- Termini: Helensvale; Burleigh Heads
- Stations: 27
- Website: ridetheg.com.au

Service
- Type: Light rail
- Operator: Keolis Australia
- Depot: Southport light rail depot
- Rolling stock: 23 Flexity 2 trams
- Ridership: 13.83 million (2024–25)

History
- Work began: July 2010
- Opened: 20 July 2014 (Stage 1); 17 December 2017 (Stage 2); 9 August 2026 (Stage 3)

Technical
- Line length: 27 km (17 mi)
- Num of tracks: 2
- Character: Ground level
- Track gauge: 1,435 mm (4 ft 8 1/2 in) standard gauge
- Electrification: 750 V DC overhead catenary
- Operating speed: 70 km/h (43 mph)

G:link (also known as the Gold Coast Light Rail or the Gold Coast tram) is a light rail system serving the Gold Coast in Queensland, Australia. The system forms part of Translink's South East Queensland public transport network and consists of the single L1 line, a 27-kilometre (17 mi) line of twenty-seven stations. At present, G:link is the sole light rail system in Queensland.

The L1 line runs between Helensvale in the north and Burleigh Heads in the south. It initially opened on 20 July 2014 and was subsequently extended northwest from Gold Coast University Hospital to Helensvale on 17 December 2017, and south from Broadbeach South to Burleigh Heads on 9 August 2026.

== History ==
The Gold Coast light rail project was first proposed in the Gold Coast City Council's City Transport Strategy plan in 1996, following several years of review and consideration. On 14 May 2002, the Howard Liberal–National federal government and the Beattie Labor state government announced contributions of A$650,000 each to fund the Gold Coast Light Rail Feasibility Study.

In 2004, the draft summary report was released, proposing a 17-kilometre (11 mi) line that would include sixteen stations from Parkwood to Hooker Boulevard. The line was proposed to be single-track between Parkwood and Griffith University; this did not eventuate in the final proposal.

=== Stage 1 ===
In 2009, the Queensland Government committed $464 million to the Gold Coast Rapid Transit (GCRT) project, supplementing $365 million committed by the federal government and $120 million provided by Gold Coast City Council.

The project was subject to protest campaigns from some local residents and politicians. Those who attempted to stop Stage 1 included then-Gold Coast mayor Ron Clarke, former mayor Lex Bell (who proposed the use of native title to stop the project), and a string of short-lived protest organisations. In March 2010, the "Stop Light Rail" website, operated by the Gold Coast Public Transport Alliance (GCPTA), briefly redirected the official light rail website, which the GCPTA alleged was undertaken as a "deliberate attempt by the three levels of government to stifle freedom of speech" and "destabilise our criticism".

In June 2011, the GoldlinQ consortium (composed of Bombardier Transportation, Downer EDI, Keolis, McConnell Dowell and Plenary Group) was awarded the contract to build and operate the Gold Coast light rail line for 18 years under a Public Private Partnership.

In August 2012, the cost of the initial 13 km (8.1 mi) section was estimated at A$1.6 billion. Construction began on the Gold Coast University Hospital station shell in July 2010, with the sod-turning event for Griffith University station taking place on 1 August 2010. In 2011, early roadworks began in Broadbeach and Southport. By November 2013, much of the work was complete with the southern section at Broadbeach being the only section of trackwork to be completed. Testing commenced on the northern section of the line in October 2013. A total of $170 million was allocated for property resumptions, with the Queens Park Tennis Club and Southport Croquet Club both relocated. During construction, Nerang Street station was known as Gold Coast Hospital station, prior to the closure of the Gold Coast Hospital in September 2013.

The line opened on 20 July 2014 with a free travel day, before normal operations began the following day.

=== Stage 2 ===
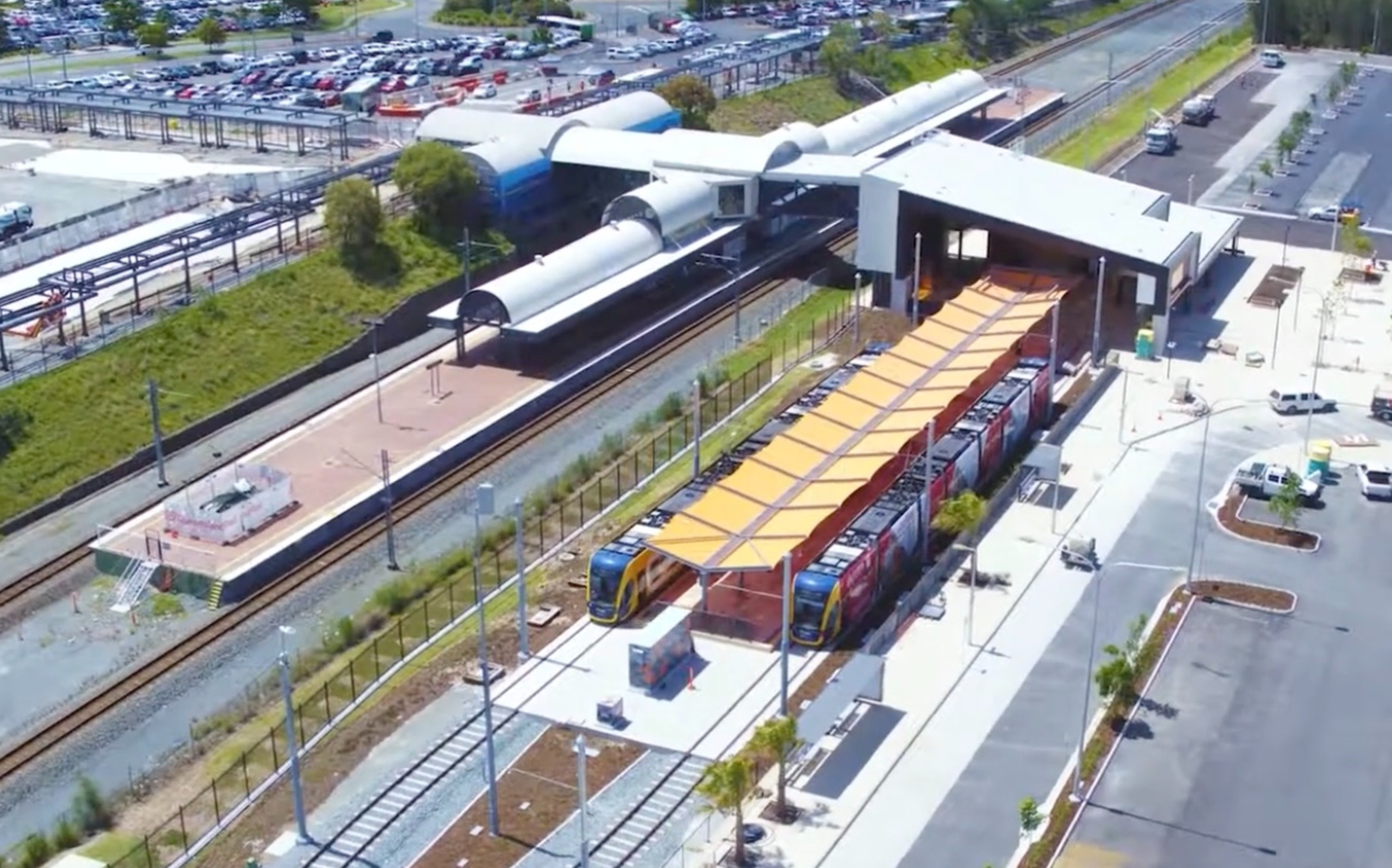
Helensvale railway station pictured in December 2017 following construction of two new light rail platforms for Stage 2

On 6 August 2015, the Queensland Government announced it would progress with plans to construct Stage 2 of the light rail line, which would extend the system 7.3 kilometres (5 miles) north from Gold Coast University Hospital to Helensvale railway station, providing a direct connection to the Gold Coast railway line. It was planned to complete the Stage 2 extension by the 2018 Commonwealth Games.

GoldlinQ and the Queensland Government entered into a new contract in April 2016. Despite holding the construction contract, GoldlinQ partnered with CPB Contractors to build Stage 2. Financial commitments from the state and federal governments for the extension were finalised in late 2016.

Three new stations were constructed as part of Stage 2, bringing the total number of stations on the light rail line to nineteen. Two stations (Parkwood East and Parkwood) were built to serve the suburb of Parkwood, with a park-and-ride facility constructed next to Parkwood station, while the existing Helensvale railway station was expanded to include two new light rail platforms located adjacent to the heavy rail platforms. Provisions for two future light rail stations in Parkwood were also made as part of Stage 2 construction.

Testing began in September 2017 and took place outside of G:link operating hours to ensure that existing services were not impacted. At the same time, four additional Flexity 2 light rail vehicles arrived to serve the light rail line.

Construction finished ahead of schedule and passenger services commenced on 17 December 2017, with the first tram departing Helensvale station at 5am. Travel on the entire light rail line was free for the opening day, with a "family fun day" – including food stalls and face painting – taking place at the three new light rail stations and Gold Coast University Hospital station. Bus timetables were updated on 8 January 2018.

=== Stage 3 ===
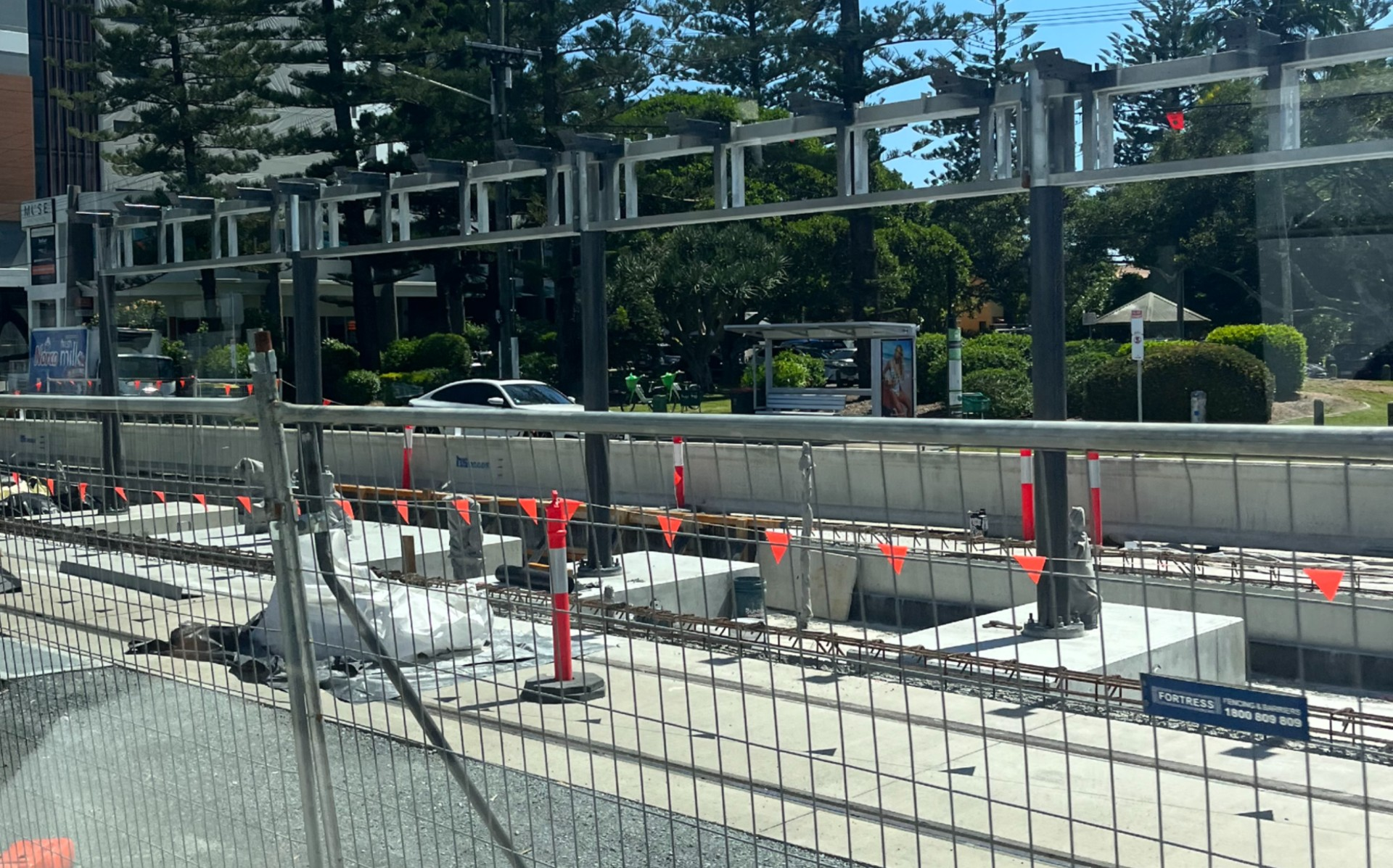
Mermaid Beach light rail station under construction for Stage 3 in December 2024

GoldlinQ confirmed in August 2012 that preliminary planning activity for an extension of the light rail line to Burleigh Heads had been undertaken, although no funding had been allocated at the time. The Department of Transport and Main Roads included a future 6.7 km (4.2 mi) extension from Broadbeach South to Burleigh Heads on a map of the line in November 2015.

In mid-2017, the Gold Coast City Council undertook community consultation on the extension, which was known as Stage 3A (later Stage 3). The preliminary business case was provided to the Queensland Government in February 2018 and planning for the extension began two months later. Consultation with residents took place in mid-2018.

The Morrison Liberal–National federal government announced in November 2018 that it would commit $112 million for Stage 3A. This was later criticised as inadequate by the Palaszczuk Labor state government, which announced $351 million of its own funding in August 2019. Subsequently, the Morrison Government committed a further $157 million for Stage 3A in November 2019, bringing the total federal funding to $269 million. The Gold Coast City Council also committed $92 million of its own funding. Because of funding disputes and the impact of the COVID-19 pandemic, the project was delayed from its initial planned opening, which would have taken place in the first half of 2021.

Preparation works took place in April 2020, with a construction compound built near Broadbeach South station. In October 2020, the John Holland Group won the contract to build the Stage 3 extension, defeating the CPB Contractors–Seymour Whyte CPBSW joint venture and the Fulton Hogan–UGL Burleigh Link joint venture.

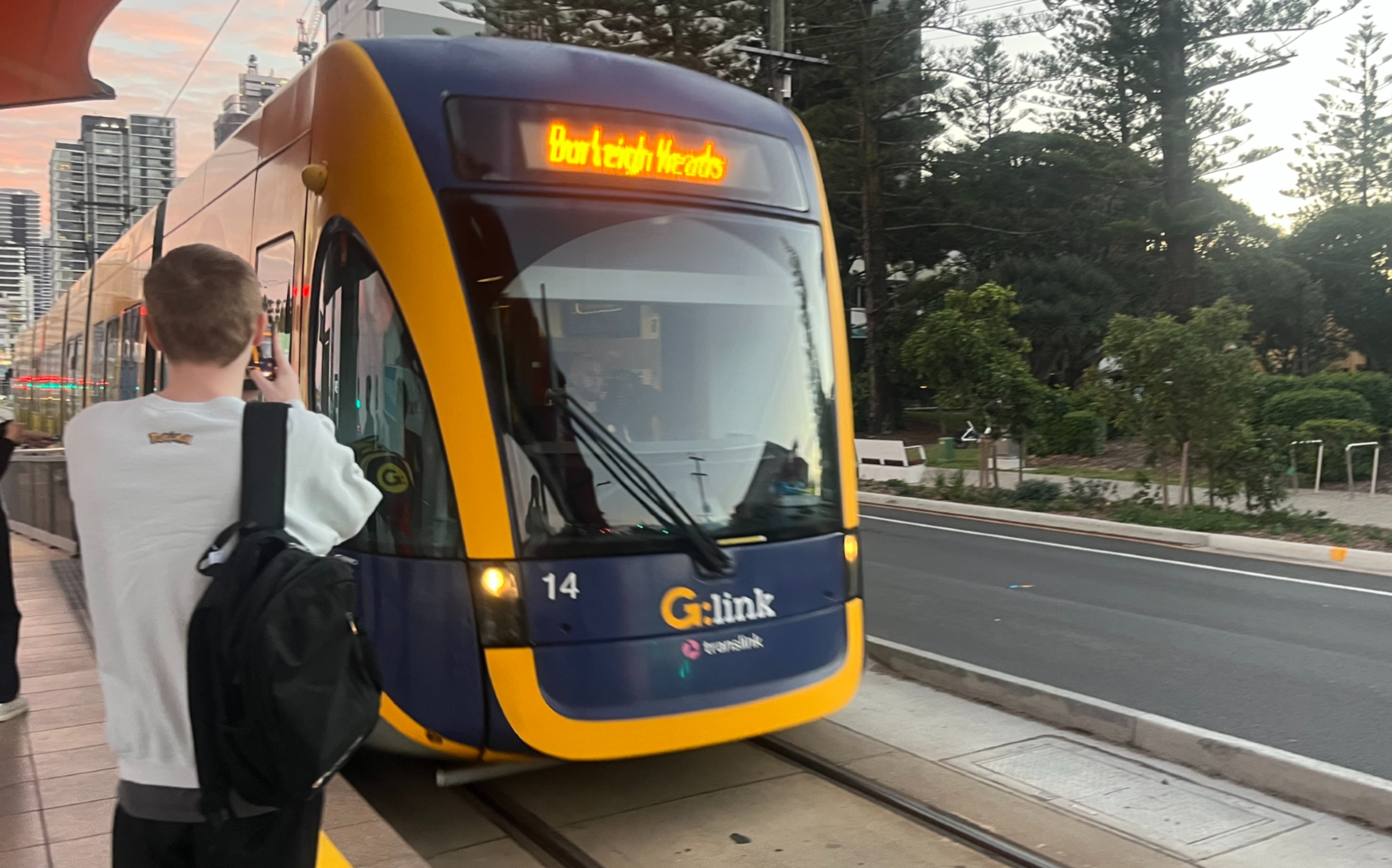
The first southbound passenger service to Burleigh Heads arriving at Mermaid Beach station on 9 August 2026

Construction of the Stage 3 extension formally began in July 2022. Eight new stations (three in Mermaid Beach, three in Miami, and two in Burleigh Heads) were built for Stage 3, bringing the total station count to 27. Bus interchanges were also constructed at Christine Avenue and Burleigh Heads. Major construction, including earthworks and construction of the tracks, commenced in 2023.

The first successful test journey by a tram to Miami North station was undertaken on 12 November 2025. The first test journey to Burleigh Heads took place on 30 April 2026. Further testing on the entire line during daylight hours began in May 2026, with trams continuing to Burleigh Heads after passengers disembark at Broadbeach South station. On 28 July 2026, an advertisement was briefly published online stating that Stage 3 would open five days later on 2 August, before GoldlinQ and transport minister Brent Mickelberg both confirmed that the extension would not open on that date. Ten days later, the Queensland Government announced the official opening date of Stage 3. Construction is scheduled to end in late November 2026.

On 9 August 2026, services on the Stage 3 extension began. GoldlinQ held events in celebration at Broadbeach South, Nobby Beach and Burleigh Heads. Following the extension's opening, the line was numbered L1 by Translink.

== Proposed extensions ==
Besides Stage 3, the Gold Coast City Council envisions an extensive light rail network that would potentially consist of 68 km (42 mi) of track and 4 light rail lines, as outlined in the City Transport Strategy 2031 report published in March 2013.

In January 2019, Gold Coast councillors voted 12–3 against building a light rail station in the Surfers Paradise neighbourhood of Paradise Waters, which had been included in the initial proposal from 2004. The Paradise Waters Action Group had opposed light rail during Stage 1 construction, with former mayor Gary Baildon suggesting that there was "a feeling that the people of Paradise Waters were punished because some of them opposed it at the time".

The Gold Coast City Council's 2031 transport plan included proposed extensions to Biggera Waters, Bundall, Nerang and a branch line from Main Beach to The Spit. The line is expected to cost around $200 million and would be paid for by developers and would be around 2.6 km (1.6 mi) long. Other proposals to Robina and Varsity Lakes were mentioned in the Gold Coast City Council's Light Rail southern Gold Coast publication.

On 19 February 2019, Tweed Heads MP Geoff Provest announced $1 million of funding towards strategic planning to extend the Gold Coast light rail system from the Gold Coast Airport to over the New South Wales border into Tweed Heads. In 2020, a feasibility study was proposed by the NSW state government for a light rail corridor between Gold Coast Airport and Tweed Heads. Gold Coast City Council stated in 2017 that it had "no objection" to extending the light rail line to Tweed Heads.

=== Stage 4 ===
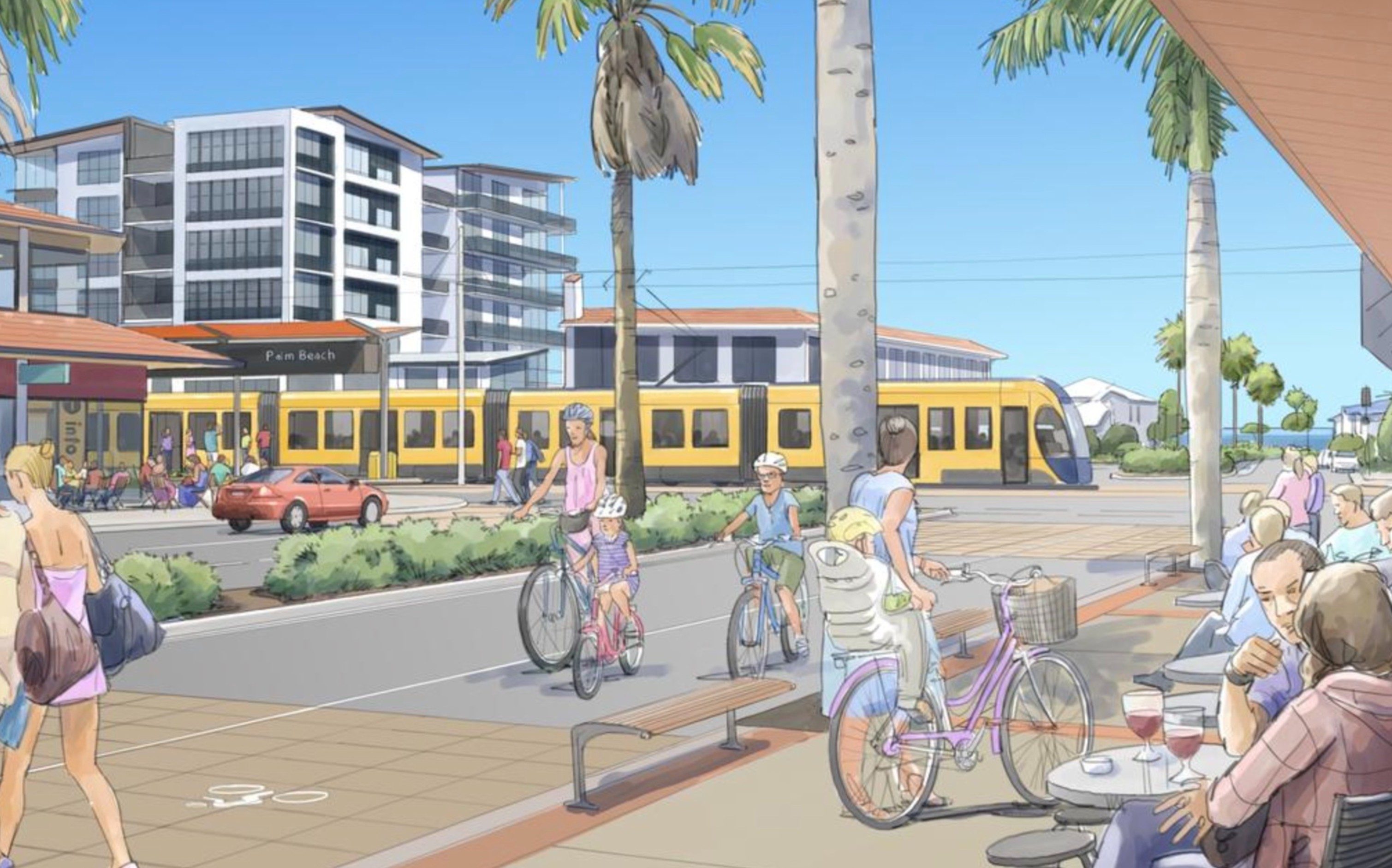
Artist's impression of Palm Beach Avenue light rail station, circa 2021

As was the case with Stage 3, preliminary planning activity for an extension of the light rail line to Coolangatta via the Gold Coast Airport had undertaken by August 2012. Under the proposal supported by the Gold Coast City Council in the City Transport Strategy 2031 report, the line would be extended from Burleigh Heads station and continue south along the Gold Coast Highway, passing through the southern suburbs of Palm Beach and Tugun and connect the airport with light rail. The report also identified a potential light rail corridor, which was preserved for possible future expansion.

In August 2020, funding was provided to formulate a business case for the extension, which was initially known as Stage 3B and later referred to as Stage 4. Since 2021, community consultation and preliminary works for stage 4 had begun. Public consultation ended in May 2025.

Stage 4 would extend the line by 13 kilometres (8 miles). It includes fourteen stations that were given provisional names: one in Burleigh Heads (Burleigh Head National Park), five in Palm Beach (Twenty Eighth Avenue, Nineteenth Avenue, Eleventh Avenue, Palm Beach Avenue and Thrower Drive), one in Currumbin (Tomewin Street), two in Tugan (Toolona Street and Boyd Street), two in Bilinga (George Street and Airport Precinct) and three in Coolangatta (Creek Street, Miles Street and Warner Street).

In addition to the airport, Stage 4 connects the light rail line to locations including the Burleigh Head National Park, Tallebudgera Leisure Centre, Currumbin Wildlife Sanctuary and Southern Cross University.

On 1 September 2025, the Crisafulli state government announced the cancellation of the Stage 4 extension. In June 2026, the GC Surfer – a bus rapid transit line running from Robina railway station to Coolangatta – was announced as a replacement for Stage 4. As of August 2026, Gold Coast mayor Tom Tate remains publicly supportive of Stage 4.

=== Biggera Waters ===
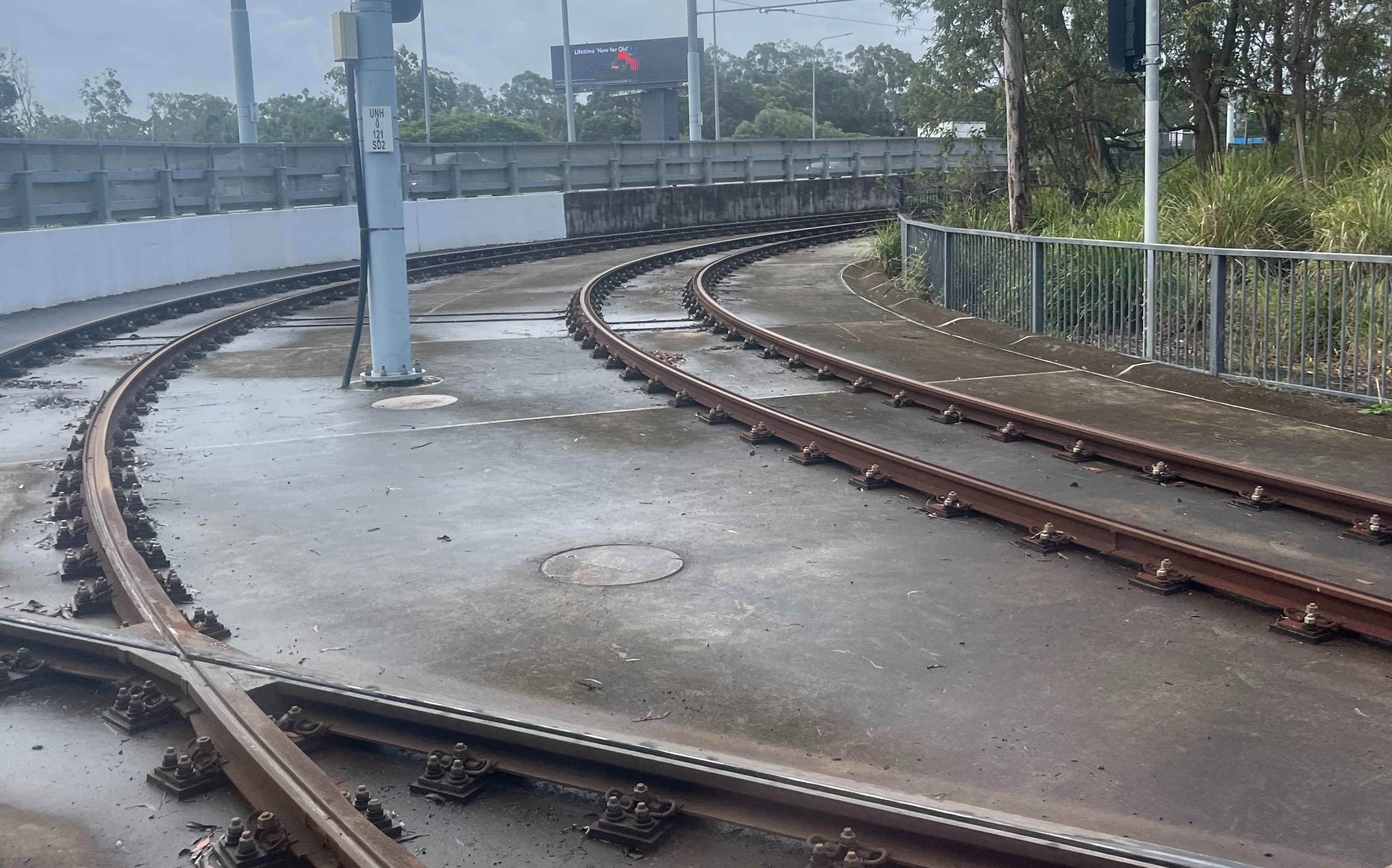
Light rail turnout from University Hospital station leading to Biggera Waters, which was constructed during Stage 2

A proposed extension of the light rail line to Biggera Waters was supported by the City Transport Strategy 2031 report. The initial proposal from Gold Coast City Council in March 2013 – which it referred to as Stage 2B – saw a branch line from Parkwood East station (referred to in the report as Parkwood station) running along Parkwood Boulevard and Captain Cook Drive, where it would reach the Gold Coast Highway. The report included Biggera Waters as part of "Line B", which would run to Broadbeach South.

During planning for the Stage 2 extension to Helensvale, extending the line to Biggera Waters was considered but did not proceed, although a turnout was built from Gold Coast University Hospital station. Following the cancellation of Stage 4, a review recommended building the Biggera Waters extension.

On 22 June 2026, the Crisafulli state government announced the extension of the light rail line to Biggera Waters. The extension will operate as a branch line from Gold Coast University Hospital station, running for approximately 4 kilometres (2 miles) along Olsen Avenue. It will consist of three new stations (provisionally known as Musgrave Avenue, Labrador and Biggera Waters), which will provide direct light rail access to Fankhauser Reserve and the Harbour Town shopping centre.

Additional light rail vehicles will be required for the extension, with plans for a second depot to be constructed. The project is expected to be completed before the start of the Brisbane Olympics in July 2032. Former GoldlinQ CEO Phil Mumford will oversee the establishment of the extension.

== Network and operations ==
The system primarily operates in a centre-running configuration. It uses standard gauge tracks with 750 V DC overhead catenary. Third rail technology was investigated in the draft summary report released in 2004, but power from overhead lines was ultimately utilised.

=== Routes ===
There are twenty-seven stations on the L1 line. The northern terminus is located at the Helensvale railway station, with the line travelling through Parkwood before reaching Gold Coast University Hospital. After travelling through Southport, the line turns south through Main Beach and Surfers Paradise before running alongside Gold Coast Highway. The line continues down the highway through Mermaid Beach and Miami before reaching Burleigh Heads, where the southern terminus is located.

=== Services ===
Services are operated by Keolis Australia, a subsidiary of French transport company Keolis. Fares are set by Translink with all stations fitted with go card readers. A 50 cent flat rate across all zones applies.

Service frequencies (in minutes) from 9 August 2026:

Time	Mon–Thu	Fri–Sun
00:00 to 05:00	Closed	30
05:00 to 07:00	15	15
07:00 to 19:00	7.5	10
19:00 to 23:30	15	15

On Monday to Friday mornings (midnight to 5 am), light rail services are replaced on most of the routes by Kinetic route 700. These buses do not service the section between Helensvale station and Gold Coast University Hospital.

=== Stations ===
All light rail stations are street-level, with the exception of Gold Coast University Hospital, which is located underground.

L1 Helensvale – Burleigh Heads line
Station	Image	Suburb	Opened	Platform	Connections	Time (Note: Travel time in minutes from Helensvale, the northern terminus of the system.)
Helensvale	Light rail station	Helensvale	17 December 2017	Island	Gold Coast line Bus transport in Queensland	0
Parkwood	Light rail station	Parkwood	17 December 2017	Side	Parking	4
Parkwood East	Light rail station	Parkwood	17 December 2017	Island		7
Gold Coast University Hospital	Light rail station	Southport	20 July 2014	Side	Bus transport in Queensland	11
Griffith University	Light rail station	Southport	20 July 2014	Side	Bus transport in Queensland	13
Queen Street	Light rail station	Southport	20 July 2014	Island		16
Nerang Street	Light rail station	Southport	20 July 2014	Side		19
Southport	Light rail station	Southport	20 July 2014	Side	Bus transport in Queensland Ferry transport in Queensland	21
Southport South	Light rail station	Southport	20 July 2014	Island	Bus transport in Queensland	23
Broadwater Parklands	Light rail station	Southport	20 July 2014	Island		24
Main Beach	Light rail station	Main Beach	20 July 2014	Island		26
Surfers Paradise North	Light rail station	Surfers Paradise	20 July 2014	Side	Bus transport in Queensland	29
Cypress Avenue	Light rail station	Surfers Paradise	20 July 2014	Side	Bus transport in Queensland	31
Cavill Avenue	Light rail station	Surfers Paradise	20 July 2014	Side	Ferry transport in Queensland	34
Surfers Paradise	Light rail station	Surfers Paradise	20 July 2014	Side		36
Northcliffe	Light rail station	Surfers Paradise	20 July 2014	Side		38
Florida Gardens	Light rail station	Surfers Paradise	20 July 2014	Island		40
Broadbeach North	Light rail station	Broadbeach	20 July 2014	Island		42
Broadbeach South	Light rail station	Broadbeach	20 July 2014	Side	Bus transport in Queensland	45
Mermaid Beach	Light rail station	Mermaid Beach	9 August 2026	Island		48
Mermaid Beach South	Light rail station	Mermaid Beach	9 August 2026	Island		50
Nobby Beach	Light rail station	Mermaid Beach	9 August 2026	Island		52
Miami North	Light rail station	Miami	9 August 2026	Island		54
Miami	Light rail station	Miami	9 August 2026	Island		56
Christine Avenue	Light rail station	Miami	9 August 2026	Island	Bus transport in Queensland	57
Second Avenue Burleigh	Light rail station	Burleigh Heads	9 August 2026	Island		60
Burleigh Heads	Light rail station	Burleigh Heads	9 August 2026	Island	Bus transport in Queensland	62

=== Patronage ===
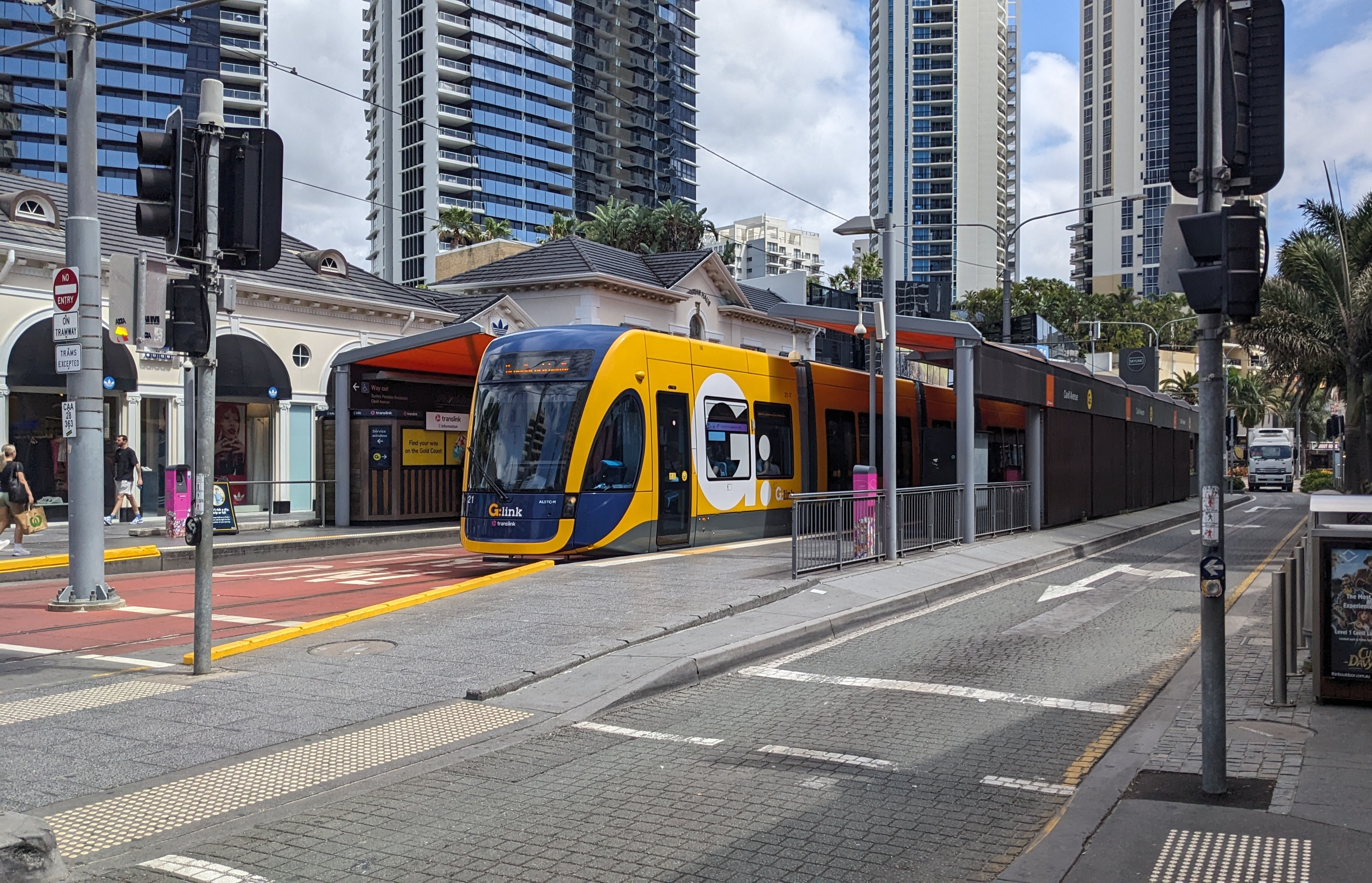
A tram waiting to depart Cavill Avenue, the busiest light rail station on the line

Over 1.74 million passengers used G:link in its first 100 days after opening in 2014. More than five million paid trips were made in the first nine months of operation. In the 2014–15 financial year, 6.28 million passengers were carried on the line and the total public transport users on the Gold Coast - across buses and trams - increased by 25 per cent.

In February 2016, the Queensland Government announced the ten million passenger milestone had been reached and noted that Cavill Avenue was the busiest station with 4,729 boardings a day.

G:link annual patronage
Year	Patronage	±%
2014–15	6.28 million	—
2015–16	7.68 million	+22.29%
2016–17	7.97 million	+3.78%
2017–18	9.49 million	+19.07%
2018–19	10.74 million	+13.17%
2019–20	8.46 million	−21.23%
2020–21	6.12 million	−27.66%
2021–22	6.34 million	+3.59%
2022–23	10.39 million	+63.88%
2023–24	11.21 million	+7.89%
2024–25	13.83 million	+23.37%
2025-26	15.30 million	+10.63%

== Rolling stock ==
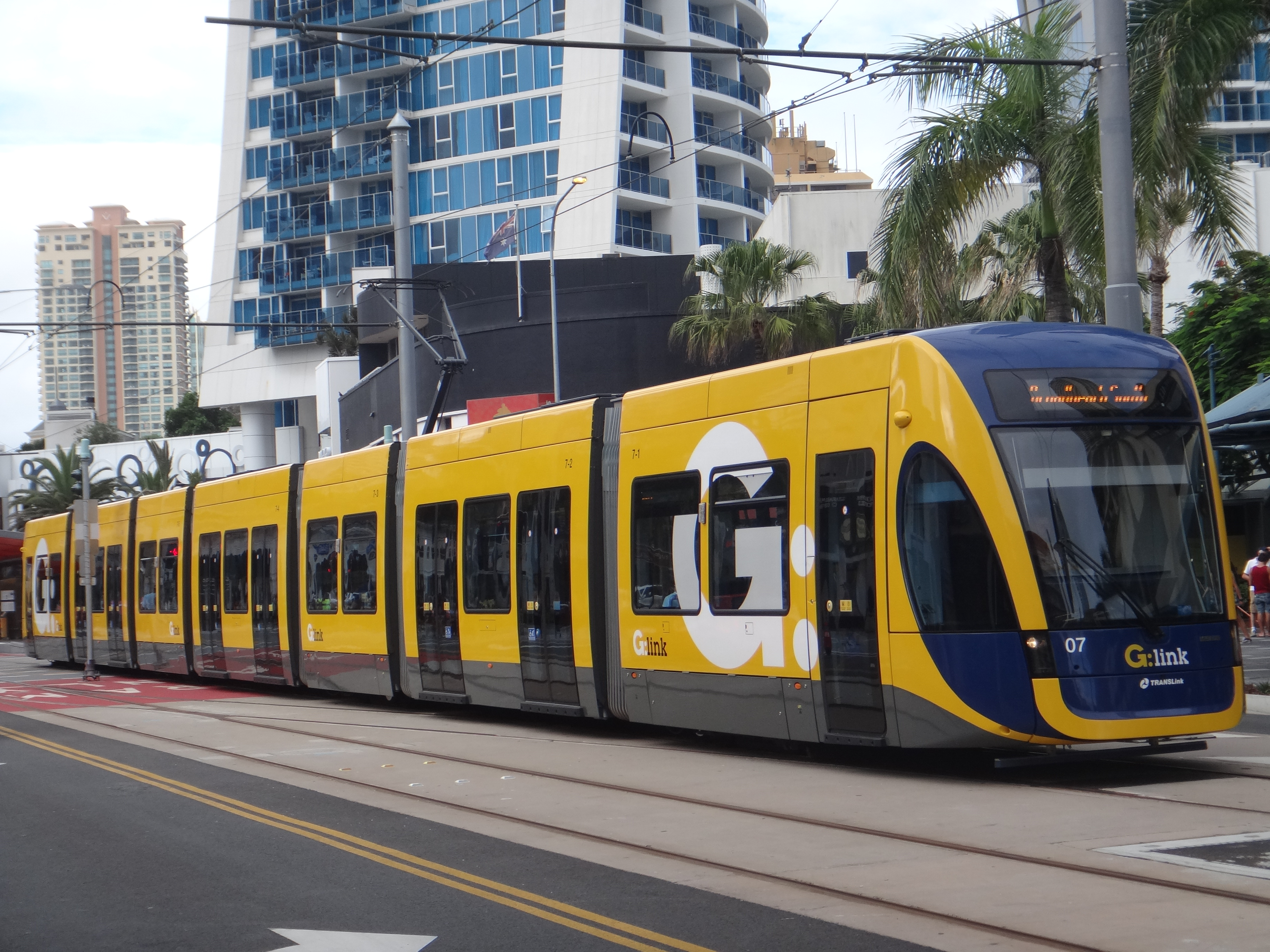
A Bombardier Flexity 2

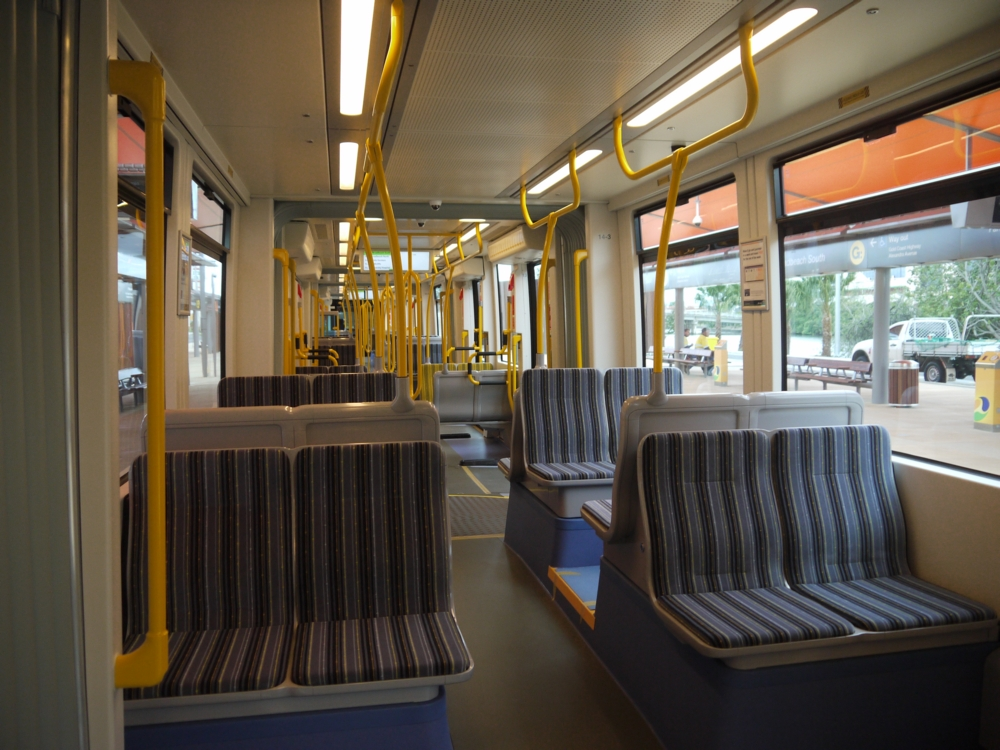
Interior

The G:link fleet consists of twenty-three Flexity 2 trams manufactured by Bombardier Transportation (now Alstom). The trams feature low floors and have dedicated spaces for wheelchairs, prams and surfboards. They have a top speed of 70 km/h (43 mph) and room for 309 passengers, including seating for 80.

Fourteen trams were ordered to serve the original section of the line. Four additional trams were ordered in November 2015 in preparation for the opening of the Stage 2 extension to Helensvale, which were delivered in September and October 2017. A further five trams built in Alstom's Wien Donaustadt plant in Austria were delivered from July 2023 as part of the Stage 3 extension, entering service in July 2024.
