= Southport light rail depot =

Light rail depot on the Gold Coast, Australia

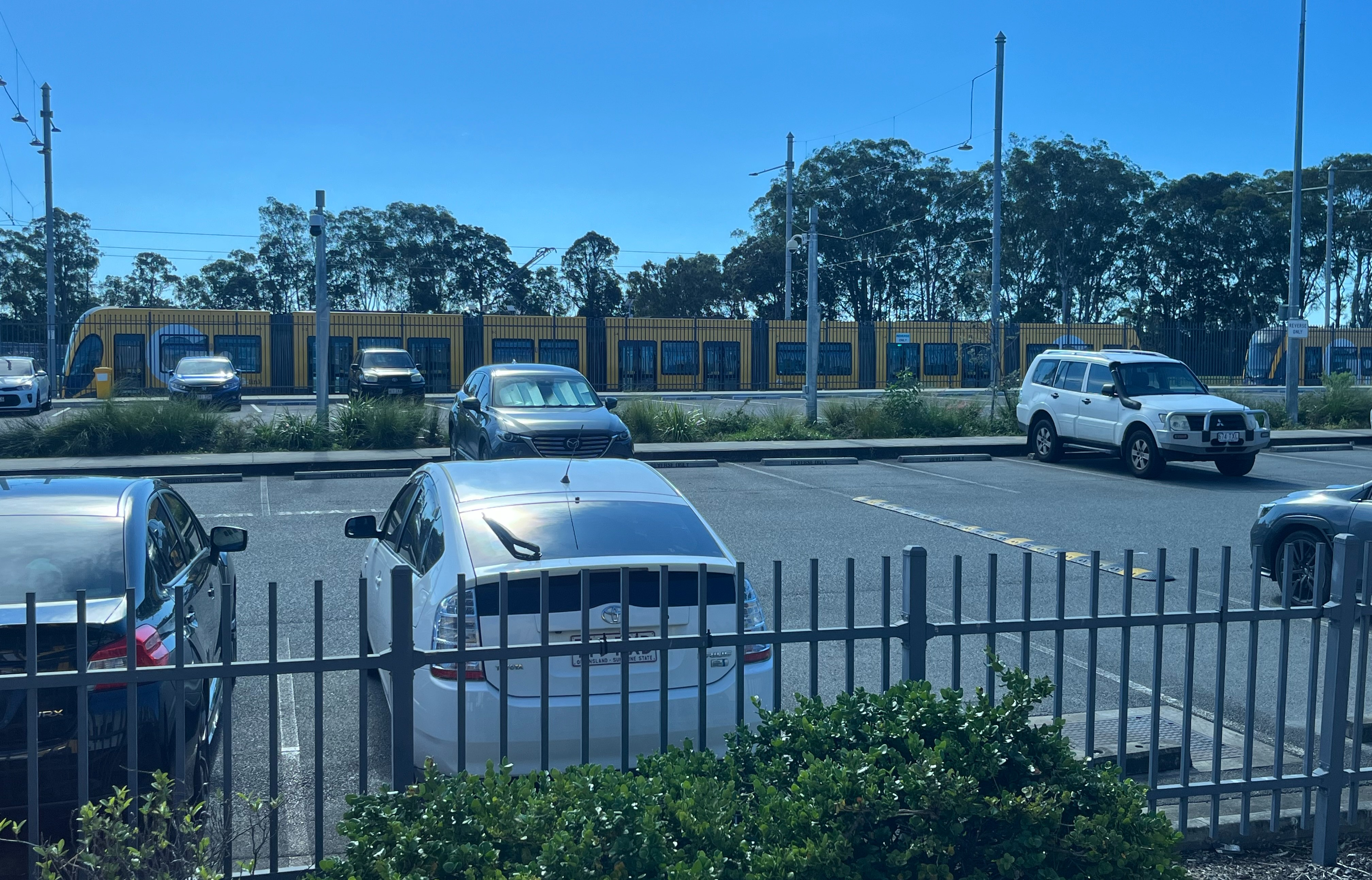
- Vehicles stored at the depot in June 2026
- Interactive map of Southport light rail depot

Location
- Location: Michelin Street, Southport
- Coordinates: 27.9681°S 153.3913°E

Characteristics
- Owner: GoldlinQ
- Operator: Keolis Australia
- Type: Light rail
- Roads: 16
- Rolling stock: Flexity 2
- Routes served: G:link

History
- Opened: 2013; 13 years ago

Southport light rail depot is a light rail depot located in the Gold Coast suburb of Southport. Operated by Keolis Australia, it opened in 2013 and is the only depot that serves the G:link light rail system.

== History ==
The Southport light rail depot was built on the former site of a landfill. To save A$5.8 million, the design of the tracks was altered to reduce the amount of landfill that was required to be excavated. Construction was completed in 2013 at a total cost of A$20 million. The first G:link-branded light rail vehicle was unveiled during a ceremony at the depot on 20 September 2013.

In late 2021, the John Holland Group began plans to upgrade to the depot to cater for five additional light rail vehicles, which would be added to the line as part of the Stage 3 extension. The upgrades, which included the addition of new stabling tracks and maintenance facilities, took place in 2022. The five additional vehicles arrived at the depot in July 2023.

A tour of the depot, hosted by the Australasian Railway Association, took place on 28 November 2024 following the AusRAIL conference.

On 22 June 2026, the Crisafulli state government announced an extension of the light rail line to Biggera Waters, with plans for a second depot to be constructed as part of the extension. The project is expected to be completed before the start of the Brisbane Olympics in July 2032.

== Layout ==
The depot features sixteen roads, with four located inside the maintenance building and twelve located outside. Three of these roads were built in 2022 for the expansion of the light rail system to Burleigh Heads.

The depot also features a tram wash-plant and a maintenance building, which contains the operations control centre and the signalling control room.

Light rail vehicles can enter and exit the facility from both northbound and southbound tracks. Some services stop adjacent to the depot to allow drivers to changeover.

== Rolling stock ==
All 23 Alstom Flexity 2 light rail vehicles used on the G:link are stored at the Southport light rail depot.
