= Leighton Asia =

Construction contractor based in Asia

Leighton Asia Limited

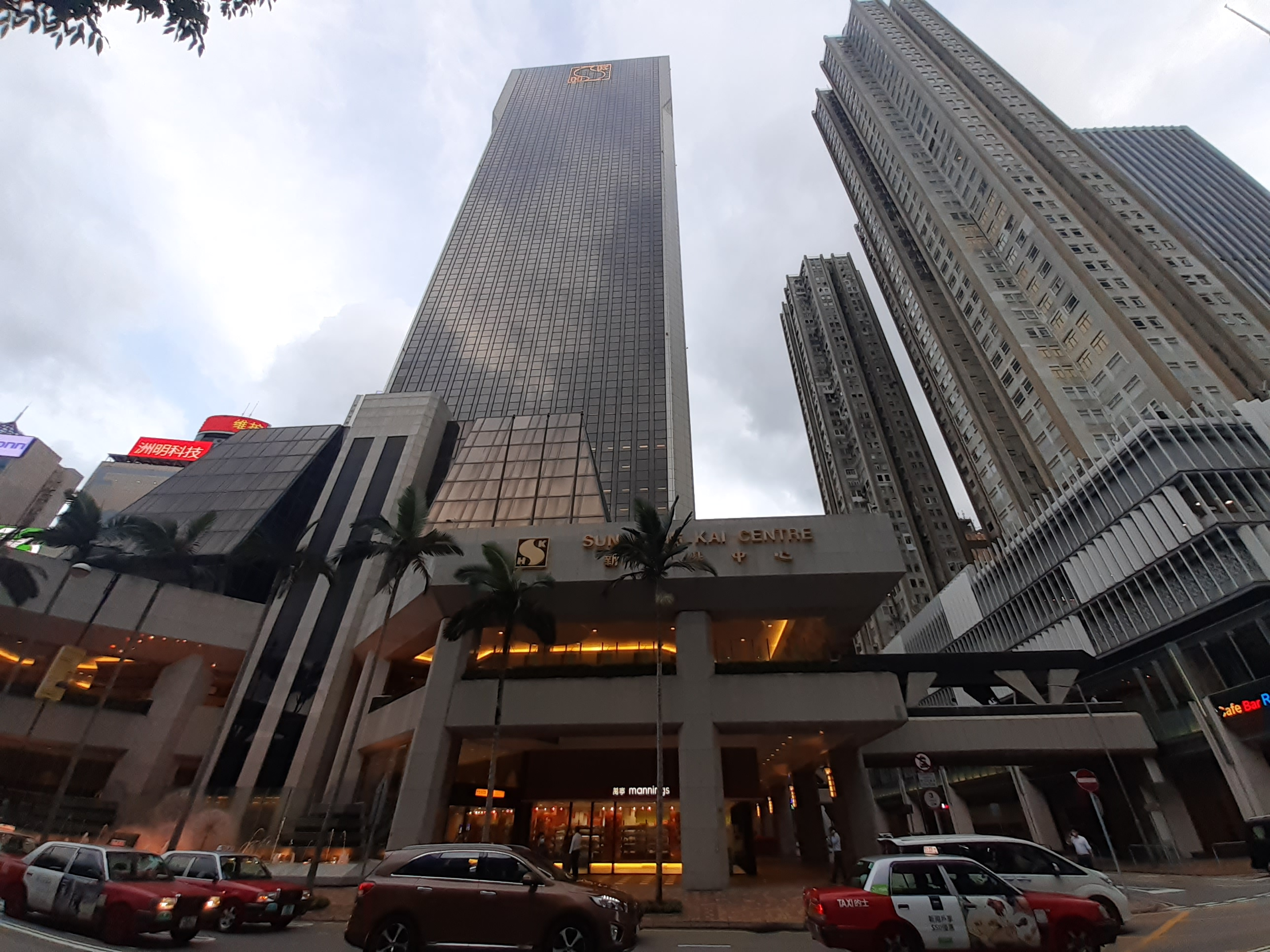
- Sun Hung Kai Centre, Leighton Asia head office location
- Company type: Subsidiary
- Industry: Construction, civil engineering
- Founded: 1975; 51 years ago
- Headquarters: Wan Chai, Hong Kong
- Area served: Asia-Pacific
- Parent: CIMIC Group
- Website: leightonasia.com

Leighton Asia Limited is an Asia-Pacific construction contractor, a part of the CIMIC Group, an Australian project development and contracting group. Leighton Asia is currently headquartered in Hong Kong, and has been operating in the continent for more than 45 years. Based in Hong Kong, the company also operates in Macau, Singapore, India, Indonesia, the Philippines, Thailand and Malaysia.

The company's business include building and civil infrastructure construction, Mechanical and electrical works, as well as oil and gas engineering.

== History ==
Leighton Asia is founded in 1975 as an Asia branch of Australian-based Leighton Contractors headquartered in Hong Kong. In June 1984 a 50% shareholding in marine civil engineering and offshore oil and gas construction company Ipcomarine was purchased.

== Hong Kong railway project ==
Leighton Asia was awarded the contract for constructing the Hung Hom station extension of the Sha Tin to Central Link, a high profile railway network extension project in Hong Kong in 2013. In 2018, Leighton Asia was accused of failure to comply with local safety standards and attempting to hide this failure until a whistleblower leaked its evidence to the local press. During a hearing of the commission of inquiry, the Hong Kong Government accused Leighton of corporate arrogance.

== Notable projects ==
=== Hong Kong ===
- Sha Tin to Central Link's Hung Hom station Contract 1112 of MTR Corporation

=== Indonesia ===
- New Australian Embassy Complex at Jakarta, Indonesia

=== Philippines ===
- North Luzon Expressway (NLEX) rehabilitation, upgrading, and extensions
- Cavite–Laguna Expressway (CALAX) Cavite segment
- Contract Packages S03a (Paco-Senate section) and S03b (Senate-FTI section and tunneling works to the Metro Manila Subway) of the North-South Commuter Railway (Joint Venture with First Balfour)

=== Singapore ===
- North South Corridor Contract N103 of Land Transport Authority (Joint Venture with Yongnam Holdings)
- Thomson–East Coast MRT line’s Springleaf MRT station Contract T208 of Land Transport Authority (Joint Venture with John Holland)

=== India ===
- Antilia (building)
