= John Rubino =

Western Australian businessman (1945 – 2023)

John Battista Rubino (26 June 1945 – 16 January 2023) was a prominent Western Australian businessman in the engineering and construction industry. After he emigrated from Sicily to Australia in 1966, Rubino co-founded the engineering company UGL, and later acquired Monadelphous, a company which he helped to revive.

== Early life ==
Rubino was born on 26 June 1945, in Delia on the island of Sicily in Italy. He was a surveyor in Italy. In 1966, at 21 years old, Rubino emigrated to Western Australia.

== Career ==
Embarking on his Australian career as a trade assistant, Rubino found a pivotal opportunity in 1970 when he became a sub-contractor on the Ord River Dam project, marking the commencement of his influential career in engineering and construction. Collaborating with fellow migrants John Trettel, Charlie Bontempo and Sam Castelli, Rubino played a crucial role in establishing UGL, a major player in the Australian contracting industry.

In 1987, UGL acquired a stake in Monadelphous, which faced receivership shortly after. Undeterred, Rubino, alongside his partners, embarked on salvaging their investment. Despite facing challenges during the early 1990s recession, Rubino assumed the role of managing director at Monadelphous. Rubino's leadership was initially panned to be temporarily, but lasted for over 30 years in the positions of chairman or managing director. Under his adept leadership, Monadelphous underwent revitalization, and by the 2010s was one of Australia's largest contracting companies.

== Legacy ==
Rubino was featured in The West Australian's WA Rich List in 2012, and was recognised as one of the most influential Western Australian businesspeople in the newspaper's 2013 list of the 100 most influential.

Rubino retired from Monadelphous in October 2022 for health reasons, and died a few months later on 16 January 2023.
