= MORM syndrome =

- Other names: Intellectual disability-truncal obesity-retinal dystrophy-micropenis syndrome, Mental retardation-truncal obesity-retinal dystrophy-micropenis syndrome
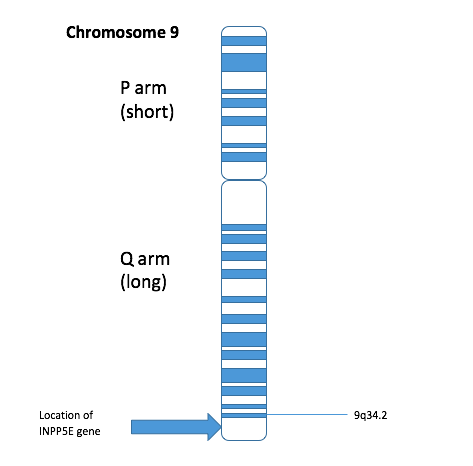
- The image shows chromosome 9. The location of the INPP5E gene has been identified in this image and is relevant as it has been associated with MORM syndrome. The gene is located on the Q or long arm of chromosome 9 and is located near 9q34.3.

MORM syndrome is an autosomal recessive congenital disorder characterized by intellectual disability, truncal obesity, retinal dystrophy, and micropenis". The disorder shares similar characteristics with Bardet–Biedl syndrome and Cohen syndrome, both of which are autosomal recessive genetic disorders. MORM syndrome can be distinguished from the above disorders because symptoms appear at a young age. The disorder is not dependent on sex of the offspring, both male and female offspring are equally likely to inherit the disorder.

The syndrome is caused by a mutation in the INPP5E gene which can be located on chromosome 9 in humans. Further mapping resulted in the identification of a MORM syndrome locus on chromosome 9q34.3 between the genetic markers D9S158 and D9S905.

== Presentation ==
For individuals with MORM syndrome, symptoms do not appear until about one year of age. From conception to birth, individuals with MORM syndrome appear asymptotic, with no abnormal characteristics. Vision is negatively affected within the first year of life, particularly night vision. Individuals with MORM syndrome experience decreased visual acuity, meaning their ability to see distinct sharp lines decreases. Vision quality continues to deteriorate until age three. Any further reduction in vision acuity is not observed until the individual is between the ages thirty to forty. Delayed sentence processing and intellectual disability is associated with individuals with MORM syndrome, primarily observed at age four. Individuals continue to develop and grow until they are five to twelve years old. During this age bracket, truncal obesity can develop, characterized by the buildup of fat around one's trunk or torso as opposed to the person's extremities. Males enter puberty at around age twelve and develop normally, except for their penis, which will remain at the prepubescent size, resulting in a micropenis. Both the life span and fertility of individuals with MORM syndrome is unclear .

== Genetic ==
MORM syndrome is associated with the gene INPP5E. INPP5E is a gene whose function is not well understood. It is hypothesized to play a role in primary cilia stability. A homozygous mutation in the INPP5E gene, on chromosome 9q34, is the cause for MORM syndrome. The mutation causes a homozygous transition in the last exon of the INPP5E gene. This transition results in the DNA bases changing from a cytosine residue to a thymine residue. The resulting protein will then have an altered amino acid sequence. In unaffected individuals this specific codon (region of DNA bases) is supposed to code for the amino acid glutamine. In cases of MORM syndrome this codon codes for a termination sequence, which prematurely stops the production of the protein. In unaffected individuals the protein is evenly disbursed throughout the cilia axoneme, which stabilizes the cilia, which are antenna like structures which protrude from the extracellular surface of the cell. They play an important role in extracellular signalling/communication between cells and their environment. When the INPP5E gene is mutated, the protein is damaged and is unable to spread out along the cilia axoneme or interact with other stabilizing proteins. This inability to stabilize one's cilia axoneme results in MORM syndrome. The exact mechanism as to how the mutation in the INPP5E gene causes cilia instability is still not well understood.

== Diagnosis ==
MORM syndrome is a genetic disorder obtained through inheritance. The main method for testing individuals showing symptoms of MORM syndrome is sequence analysis of the entire coding region. When performing a sequence analysis of the entire coding region the gene INPP5E is targeted. Sequence analysis is the biotechnological process in which the structure and sequence of DNA, RNA, or protein sequence is determined through the use of technology. This sequence can be analyzed to determine mutations or abnormalities in that particular region. When testing for MORM syndrome, sequence analysis of the region of the genome which contains the gene INPP5E is targeted and examined to look for mutations.
