= Stanley Leighton (businessman) =

Stanley Ellis Leighton (1898 – 12 June 1991) was a construction entrepreneur. He was the founder of Leighton Contractors, later known as CIMIC Group, which is Australia's largest contracting business.

== Biography ==
Born in the United Kingdom, Leighton served as a lieutenant in the Suffolk Regiment during the latter stages of First World War. He joined his father's house-building business, D. Leighton and Sons, in 1920. He succeeded his father as managing director and, after the Second World War, when contracting margins tightened in the UK, he emigrated to Australia to establish and expand the Australian Branch of the business. Under his leadership, the company became a major contractor in Australia and was the subject of an initial public offering on the Melbourne Stock Exchange in 1962. He retired in 1972 and died in 1991.
