= INPP5E =

Mammalian protein found in Homo sapiens

Identifiers
- Aliases: INPP5E, CORS1, CPD4, JBTS1, MORMS, PPI5PIV, inositol polyphosphate-5-phosphatase E, pharbin
- External IDs: OMIM: 613037; MGI: 1927753; GeneCards: INPP5E
Available structures
PDB	Ortholog search: PDBe RCSB
PDB	List of PDB id codes 2XSW
Enzyme activity
EC #	BRENDA	ExPASy	KEGG	MetaCyc
3.1.3.36	↗	↗	↗	↗
3.1.3.86	↗	↗	↗	↗

Gene location (Human)
Chr.	Chromosome 9 (human)
Band	9q34.3	Start	136,428,619 bp
Band	9q34.3	End	136,439,845 bp

Gene location (Mouse)
Chr.	Chromosome 2 (mouse)
Band	2|2 A3	Start	26,286,261 bp
Band	2|2 A3	End	26,299,215 bp
RNA expression pattern
Bgee	Human / Mouse (ortholog); Top expressed in: right uterine tube; secondary oocyte; right hemisphere of cerebellum; apex of heart; canal of the cervix; right lobe of thyroid gland; body of uterus; left ovary; right ovary; left lobe of thyroid gland / Top expressed in: genital tubercle; spermatid; tail of embryo; granulocyte; cerebellar cortex; ventricular zone; aortic valve; cumulus cell; spermatocyte; ascending aorta; More reference expression data
BioGPS	n/a
Gene ontology
Molecular function	hydrolase activity; inositol-polyphosphate 5-phosphatase activity; phosphatidylinositol-4,5-bisphosphate 5-phosphatase activity; protein binding
Cellular component	cytoplasm; cytosol; Golgi apparatus; cell projection; membrane; ruffle; Golgi membrane; plasma membrane; Golgi cisterna membrane; axoneme; cytoskeleton; cilium
Biological process	phosphatidylinositol metabolic process; lipid metabolism; phosphatidylinositol dephosphorylation; phosphatidylinositol biosynthetic process; inositol phosphate dephosphorylation; biological process; negative regulation of protein localization to cilium
Sources:Amigo / QuickGO
Orthologs
Databases	NCBI: entry; OMA: entry
Species	Human	Mouse
Entrez	56623	64436
Ensembl	ENSG00000148384	ENSMUSG00000026925
UniProt	Q9NRR6	Q9JII1
RefSeq (mRNA)	NM_019892; NM_001318502	NM_001290437; NM_033134
RefSeq (protein)	NP_001305431; NP_063945	NP_001277366; NP_149125
Location (UCSC)	Chr 9: 136.43 – 136.44 Mb	Chr 2: 26.29 – 26.3 Mb
PubMed search
- Wikidata
View/Edit Human	View/Edit Mouse

72 kDa inositol polyphosphate 5-phosphatase, also known as phosphatidylinositol-4,5-bisphosphate 5-phosphatase or Pharbin, is an enzyme that in humans is encoded by the INPP5E gene.

== Function ==
INPP5E is a phosphatidylinositol (3,4,5)-trisphosphate (PtdInsP3) and phosphatidylinositol 4,5-bisphosphate 5-phosphatase. Its intracellular localization is the primary cilium, a small organelle involved in signal transduction. INPP5E plays a role in hydrolyzing PtdInsP3 produced in response to various growth factors such as PDGF. Inactivation of the mouse INPP5E gene decreases primary cilia stability, leading to a multiorgan disorder, including absence of eyes, polydactyly, exencephaly and renal cysts.

== Clinical significance ==
Mutations in the INPP5E are associated with MORM syndrome and Joubert syndrome.
