= UGL (company) =

Engineering company

- Company type: Subsidiary
- Industry: Construction and Engineering
- Founded: 1970
- Headquarters: North Sydney, New South Wales, Australia
- Area served: Australia, New Zealand, Asia
- Key people: Doug Moss, Managing Director
- Services: Engineering
- Owner: CIMIC Group
- Number of employees: 7,850 (June 2016)
- Parent: CIMIC Group
- Divisions: UGL Rail
- Website: www.ugllimited.com

UGL, formerly known as the United Group, is an engineering company. The company provides construction, maintenance, and asset management services to the rail, resources, and infrastructure sectors, and corporate real estate, facilities management, and business process outsourcing services to property users. Its clients are large companies, governments and institutions in Australia, New Zealand, Asia. It was purchased by the CIMIC Group in December 2016.

== History ==
UGL was founded as an engineering construction firm in Perth, Western Australia in 1970 by Charlie Bontempo, Sam Castelli, John Rubino and John Trettel. In 1988, it was re-branded as the United Construction Group.

UGL has acquired a number of businesses, including engineering, construction, and facilities management business Kilpatrick Green in 1998, rail company Goninan in 1999, corporate real estate business KFPW in 2002, Thames Water Projects Asia in 2004, Singaporean real estate services company Premas International (UGL Premas) and Alstom's Australian and New Zealand transport and rail businesses in 2005, Chicago-based Equis Corporation (UGL Equis) and Canberra-based Peak Security in 2006, and Boston-based Unicco Services Company (UGL Unicco) in 2007.

In 2011, a commercial real estate firm DTZ was acquired, but was sold in 2014 to a consortium of TPG Capital, PAG Asia Capital and the Ontario Teachers' Pension Plan.

In October 2016, CIMIC Group launched a successful takeover offer for the company, with CIMIC applying in December 2016 to compulsorily acquire all remaining shares.

== Timeline ==
- 1994 – Listed on the Australian Securities Exchange as United Construction
- 1997 – Changed company name to United Group Limited
- 1998 – Acquisition of Kilpatrick Green
- 1999 – Acquisition of Goninan
- 2002 – Acquisition of KFPW from Knight Frank & PwC
- 2004 – Acquisition of Thames Water Projects Asia from Thames Water
- 2005 – Acquisition of Premas, and the Australian & New Zealand operations of Alstom
- 2006 – Acquisition of Equis, Fischer Industries, Goulburn Railway Workshops, Peak Security and Steelplan
- 2007 – Acquisition of Proactive Communication Solutions and Unicco
- 2009 – Changed company name to UGL Limited
- 2011 – Acquisition of DTZ
- 2014 – Disposal of DTZ
- 2016 – Taken over by CIMIC Group
