= CIMIC Group =

Australian construction contractor

CIMIC Group Limited
- Formerly: Leighton Holdings
- Type: Subsidiary
- Industry: Construction, Civil engineering
- Founded: 1949; 77 years ago
- Founder: Stanley Leighton
- Headquarters: North Sydney, New South Wales, Australia
- Revenue: A$14.9 billion (2022)
- Number of employees: 25,500
- Parent: Hochtief
- Subsidiaries: CPB Contractors; Leighton Asia; Broad Construction; Thiess; Sedgman; UGL; UGL Rail; Pacific Partnerships; EIC Activities
- Website: cimic.com.au

CIMIC Group Limited (formerly Leighton Holdings) is an engineering-led construction, mining, services and public private partnerships leader working across the lifecycle of assets, infrastructure and resources projects.

== History ==
Logo used prior to April 2015

Founded in 1949 by Stanley Leighton, Leighton Holdings was first listed on the Melbourne Stock Exchange in 1962. The company formed Leighton Asia, based in Hong Kong, in 1975.

In July 1983 Leighton Holdings, purchased Thiess Contractors, with its major shareholder, Hochtief, becoming a shareholder in Leighton Holdings. In April 1997, the Welded Mesh structural materials division was sold to Smorgon Steel.

In 2000, Leighton Holdings bought a 70% stake in John Holland; this was increased to 99% in 2004 and 100% in December 2007. Hochtief became a majority shareholder of Leighton Holdings in February 2001.

In October 2013, Fairfax Media alleged that Leighton Holdings had made corrupt payments to Hussain al-Shahristani, Deputy Prime Minister of Iraq, to secure an oil pipeline contract in Iraq and other contracts. Basil Al Jarah, the Iraq country manager for Unaoil, a Monaco-based company allegedly acting for Leighton Holdings, subsequently pleaded guilty to corruption.

By March 2014, Spanish company ACS Group, through its acquisition of a majority shareholding in Hochtief, was the majority owner of Leighton Holdings. In June 2014, Verdes also became chairman of Leighton's executive board.

In December 2014, Leighton Holdings sold John Holland to China Communications Construction for $1.15 billion.

In April 2015, Leighton changed its name to CIMIC Group (abbreviated from Construction, Infrastructure, Mining and Concessions).

In March 2016, CIMIC purchased mining company Sedgman for A$256 million. In December 2016, CIMIC purchased engineering company UGL Limited for A$524 million.

In November 2021, the Ventia services division was spun off with CIMIC retaining a 33% shareholding.

In March 2022, CIMIC was accused of arranging its affairs through the sale of its Middle Eastern business interests to avoid paying workers, subcontractors and suppliers in the region. Fatima Almass Al-Hamad, a judicial guard in Qatar, who was appointed by the court as an administrator of the Qatar business, Leighton Contractors Qatar, described the situation as "a humanitarian disaster".

In April 2022, Hochtief increased its shareholding and commenced action to compulsorily acquire the remaining shares in CIMIC it did not own. Following this, CIMIC was delisted from the Australian Securities Exchange and became a wholly owned subsidiary of Hochtief.

== Structure ==
CIMIC Group includes the following businesses:

- CPB Contractors (construction)
- Leighton Asia (construction)
- Broad Construction (construction)
- Thiess (joint control) (mining)
- Sedgman (mining)
- UGL Limited (services)
  - UGL Rail
- Pacific Partnerships (development and investment)
- EIC Activities (engineering consultancy)

== Major projects ==
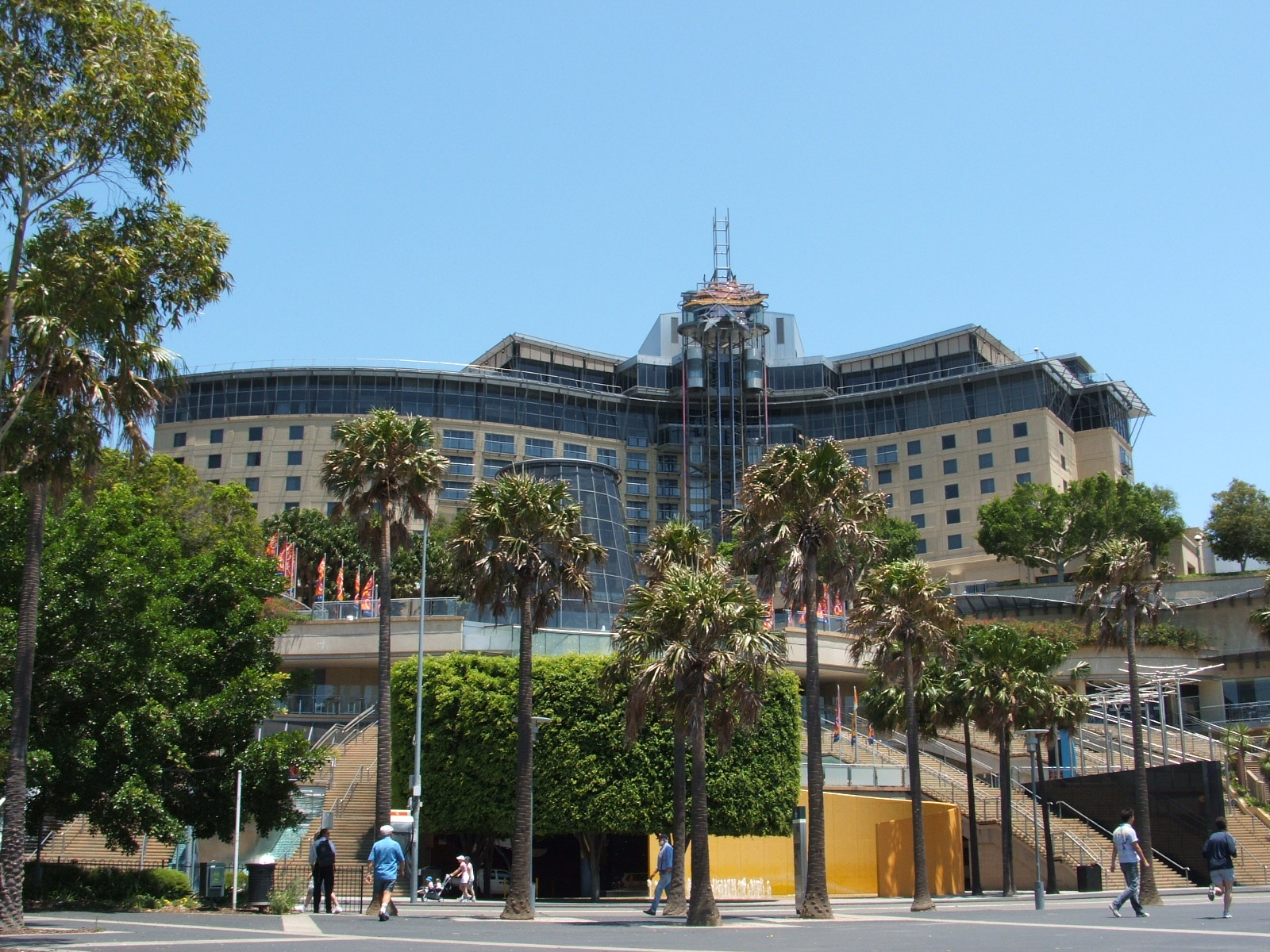
Star City Casino in 2007

Major projects undertaken by Leighton Contractors (renamed CPB Contractors in January 2016) include:

- Yarra Glen Road, Canberra, completed in 1967
- Ross River Dam, Queensland, completed in 1971
- Australian Astronomical Observatory, Sydney, completed in 1971
- Tallowa Dam, New South Wales, completed in 1976
- Canberra Stadium, completed in 1977
- Bowen Bridge, Tasmania, completed in 1984
- Burdekin Dam, Queensland, completed in 1987
- Brisbane Airport, completed in 1988
- Sydney Convention & Exhibition Centre, completed in 1988
- Newman to Port Hedland section of the Great Northern Highway, completed in 1990
- ABC Centre, Ultimo, completed in 1991
- Brisbane Convention & Exhibition Centre, completed in 1995
- Star City Casino, Sydney, completed in 1997
- North Lantau Highway, Hong Kong, completed in 1997
- Olympic Park railway station, Sydney, completed in 1998
- Eastern Distributor, Sydney, completed in 1999
- Second Narrows Road Bridge, Perth, completed in 2001
- Westlink M7, Sydney, completed in 2005
- Cross City Tunnel, Sydney, completed in 2005
- Westpac Place, Sydney, completed in 2006
- Mandurah line, Western Australia, completed in 2007
  - Package E: Kwinana Freeway roadworks
  - Package F: William Street tunnel, with Kumagai Gumi
- North-West T-way, Sydney, completed in 2007
- Eagle's Nest Tunnel and Sha Tin Heights Tunnel, Hong Kong, completed in 2008
- Buranda to Coorparoo sections of the Eastern Busway, Queensland, completed in 2009
- Forrest Highway, Western Australia, competed in 2009
- Clem Jones Tunnel, Brisbane, completed in 2010
- Gateway Bridge Duplication, Brisbane, completed in 2011
- ABC Brisbane Centre, completed in 2012
- Deer Park West to West Werribee Junction, Regional Rail Link, Melbourne, completed in 2015
- South Island line, Hong Kong, completed in 2016
- Redevelopment of the Royal Adelaide Hospital, completed in 2017
- Northern Beaches Hospital, Sydney, completed in 2018
- M4 East, Sydney, completed in 2019
- Canberra Metro, completed in 2019
- Sydney Metro Northwest, Sydney, completed in 2019
- Sunbury railway line upgrade, Melbourne, completed in 2023
- Parramatta Light Rail Stage 1, Sydney, completed in 2024
- West Gate Tunnel, Melbourne, completed in 2025
- Sydney Metro City & Southwest, Sydney, due to be completed in 2026
