= Flexity 2 =

Family of light-rail vehicles

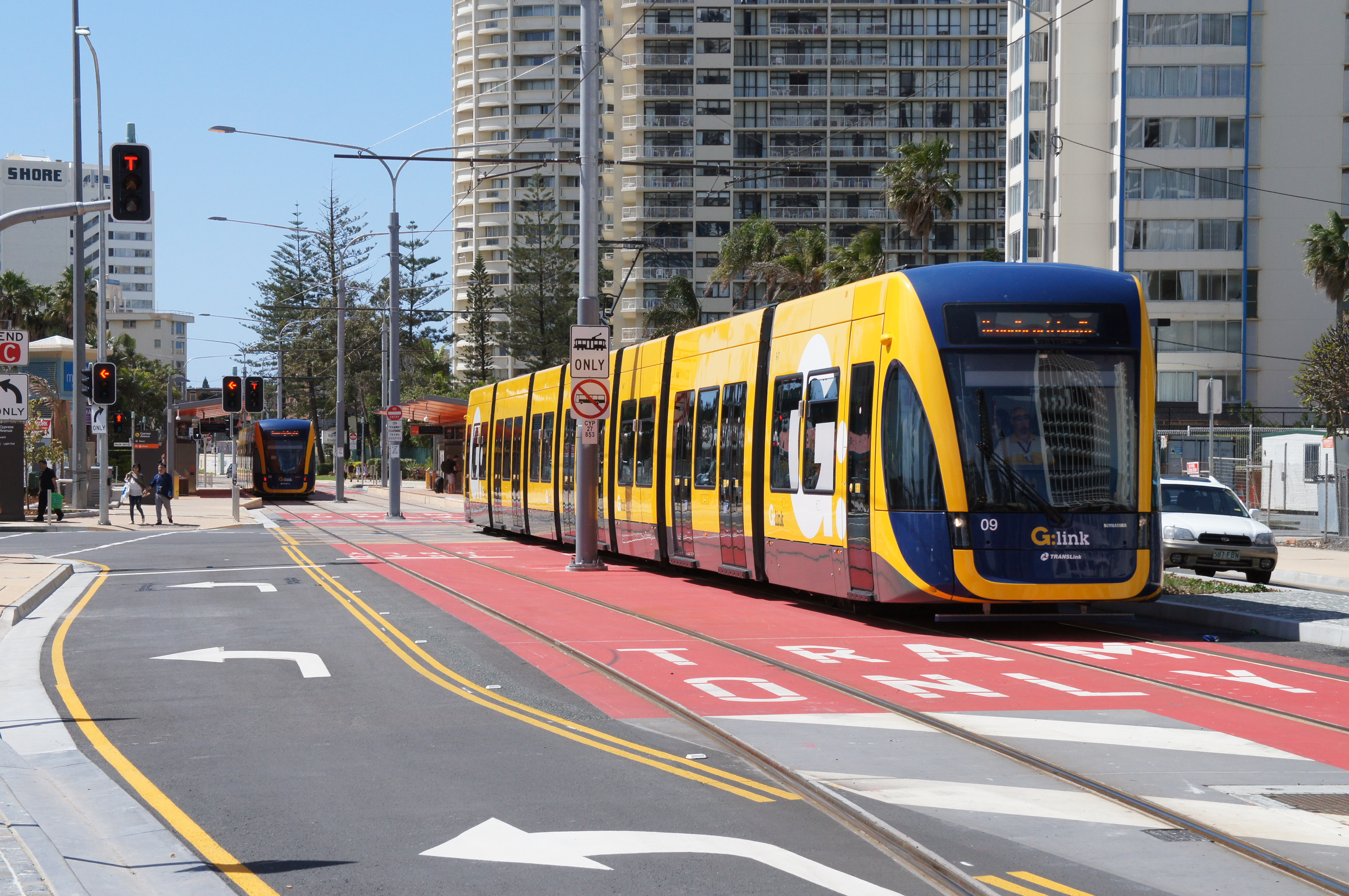
- A Bombardier Flexity 2 on the G:link, 2014.
- Manufacturers: Bombardier Transportation, later Alstom
- Family name: Flexity

Specifications
- Traction system: Bombardier/Alstom MITRAC 500 IGBT-VVVF
- Electric system: 600–750 V DC from overhead catenary
- Current collection: Pantograph
- Bogies: Flexx Urban
- Track gauge: 1,435 mm (4 ft 8 1/2 in) standard gauge or 1,000 mm (3 ft 3 3/8 in) metre gauge

The Flexity 2 is a family of tram or light rail vehicle manufactured by Bombardier Transportation (now Alstom). It is 100% low-floor, in order to easily accommodate wheelchairs and pushchairs. The trams can be uni-directional of bi-directional, with cabs at one or both ends and doors on one or both sides, and are articulated with five or seven sections. This family of trams debuted on the Blackpool Tramway, England.

== Introduction ==
The Flexity 2 is an evolution of Bombardier's successful Flexity family of LRVs and is designed to be highly customisable. It incorporates a number of significant advances over its predecessor including improved corrosion resistance, enhanced safety through a redesigned cab with improved impact protection, improved energy efficiency through the inclusion of cells to store energy temporarily after braking which achieves double the energy saving of feeding it back through the wires, reduced mass, optional support for its Primove under track power transmission system and the new Flexx Urban 3000 bogie which allows the LRV to run on more conventional wheelsets. The vehicle also features improved air-conditioning and a wider more spacious interior via the reduction in the width of its sidewalls allowing more seating or other uses. These changes have resulted in a very slight increase in axle load, although Bombardier says this does not limit the operational capabilities of the vehicle.

The first customer was Blackpool Transport with an initial order for 16 units in July 2009 to replace its tourist-focused and high-maintenance heritage fleet with a new vehicle suitable for daily commuters. The worldwide launch of the tram, including showing the first new tram arrived on 8 September 2011, at the new Starr Gate depot in Blackpool.

Additional orders came from G:link ordering 23 for operation on the Gold Coast, Australia, Basler Verkehrs-Betriebe ordering 60 for Basel, Switzerland and De Lijn ordering a total of 88 for Antwerp and Ghent, Belgium.

In 2012 Bombardier licensed the Flexity 2 design to CSR Puzhen for production in China for 10 years. Trams produced under this agreement were supplied to the Suzhou Tram, Suzhou New District, and the Hexi tram and Qilin tram lines in Nanjing. The Nanjing trams are fitted with lithium ion batteries to allow catenary-free operation, with charging at tram stops.

== Technical specifications ==
City	Operator	Type designation	Built in	Number of vehicles	Articulated sections	Track gauge	Length	Width	Height	Maximum power	Maximum speed	Catenary voltage
Blackpool, England	Blackpool Transport	Flexity 2 (Blackpool)	2010–2012, 2017	18	5	Standard (1,435 mm (4 ft 8 1/2 in))	32.23 m (105 ft 9 in)	2.65 m (8 ft 8 in)	3.42 m (11 ft 3 in)	480 kW (640 hp)	50 mph (80 km/h)	600 V DC
Gold Coast, Australia	G:link	Flexity 2	2013–2014, 2017, 2023	23	7	Standard (1,435 mm (4 ft 8 1/2 in))	43.4 m (142 ft 5 in)	2.65 m (8 ft 8 in)	3.58 m (11 ft 9 in)		70 km/h (43 mph)	750 V DC
Basel, Switzerland	Basler Verkehrs-Betriebe	Be 4/6	2015–2018	44	5	Metre (1,000 mm (3 ft 3 3/8 in))	31.6 m (103 ft 8 in)	2.3 m (7 ft 7 in)	3.7 m (12 ft 2 in)	440 kW (590 hp)	70 km/h (43 mph)	650 V DC
Basel, Switzerland	Basler Verkehrs-Betriebe	Be 6/8	2015–2018	17	7	Metre (1,000 mm (3 ft 3 3/8 in))	42.9 m (140 ft 9 in)	2.3 m (7 ft 7 in)	3.7 m (12 ft 2 in)	660 kW (890 hp)	70 km/h (43 mph)	650 V DC
Antwerp and Ghent, Belgium	De Lijn	Albatross	2014–2016	38	5	Metre (1,000 mm (3 ft 3 3/8 in))	31.8 m (104 ft 4 in)	2.3 m (7 ft 7 in)	3.46 m (11 ft 4 in)	440 kW (590 hp)	70 km/h (43 mph)	600 V DC
Antwerp and Ghent, Belgium	De Lijn	Albatross	2014–2016	50	7	Metre (1,000 mm (3 ft 3 3/8 in))	43.0 m (141 ft 1 in)	2.3 m (7 ft 7 in)	3.46 m (11 ft 4 in)	660 kW (890 hp)	70 km/h (43 mph)	600 V DC
Suzhou New District, Suzhou, China	Suzhou Tram	Flexity 2	2014	18	5	Standard (1,435 mm (4 ft 8 1/2 in))	32 m (105 ft 0 in)	2.65 m (8 ft 8 in)			70 km/h (43 mph)	750 V DC
Nanjing, China	Nanjing Trams	Flexity 2	2014–2017	15	5	Standard (1,435 mm (4 ft 8 1/2 in))	32 m (105 ft 0 in)	2.65 m (8 ft 8 in)				
Melbourne, Australia	Yarra Trams	G Class	2022–	100	3	Standard (1,435 mm (4 ft 8 1/2 in))	25 m (82 ft 0 in)	TBA		420 kW (560 hp)	80 km/h (50 mph)	600 V DC

== Gallery ==
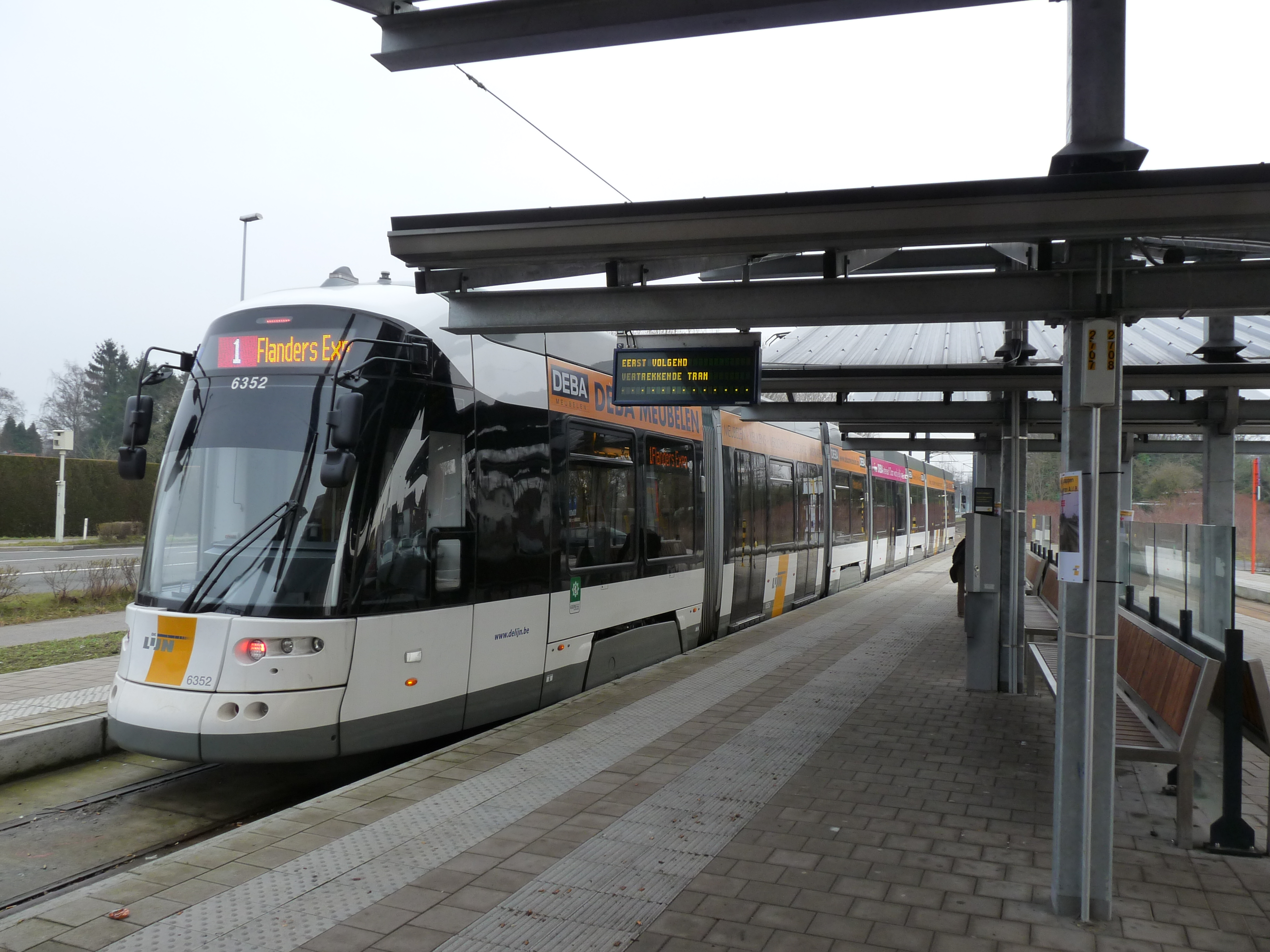
One of the 88 Flexity 2 trams ordered by De Lijn.

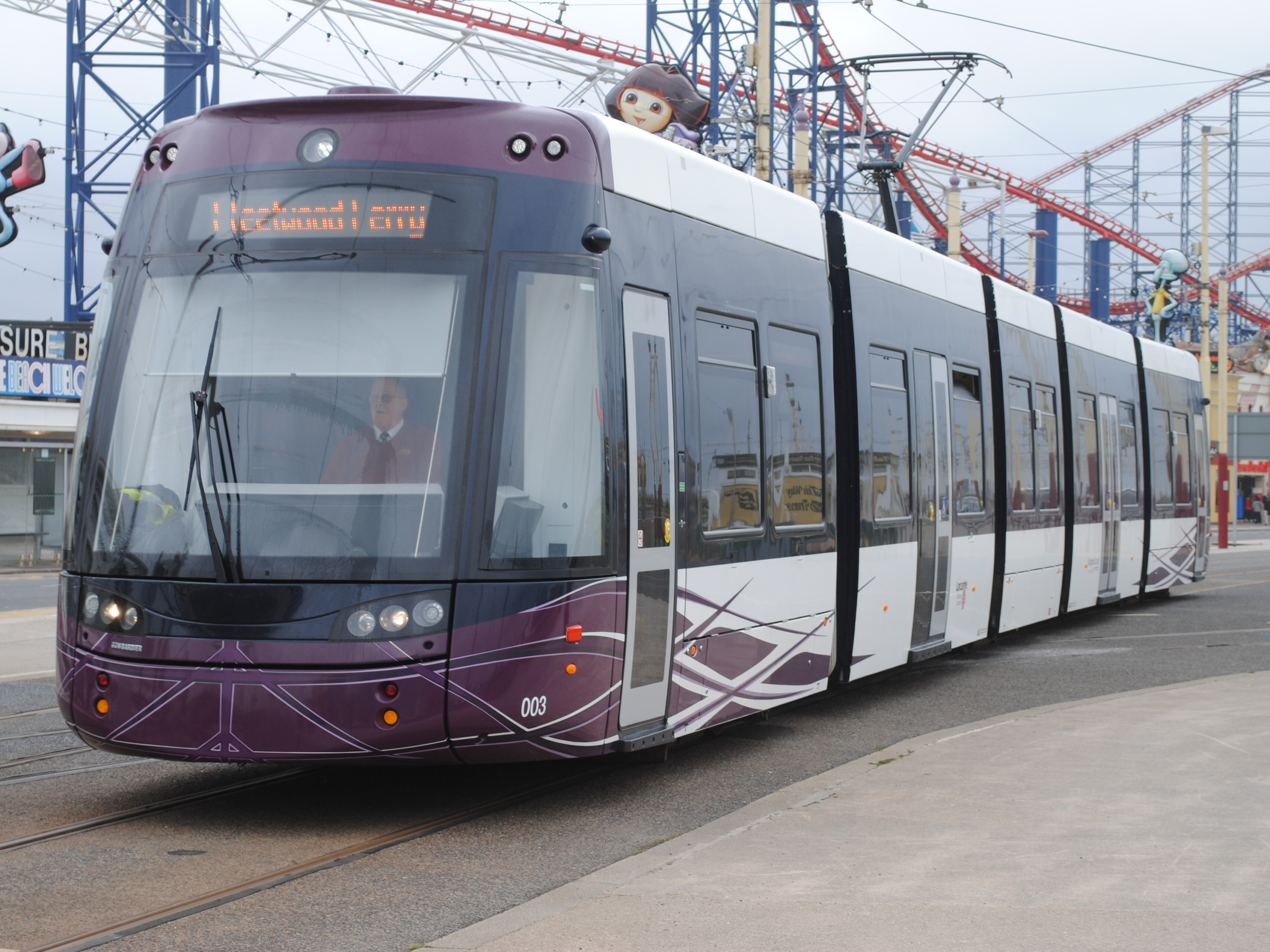
Blackpool Transport Flexity 2 in June 2013.

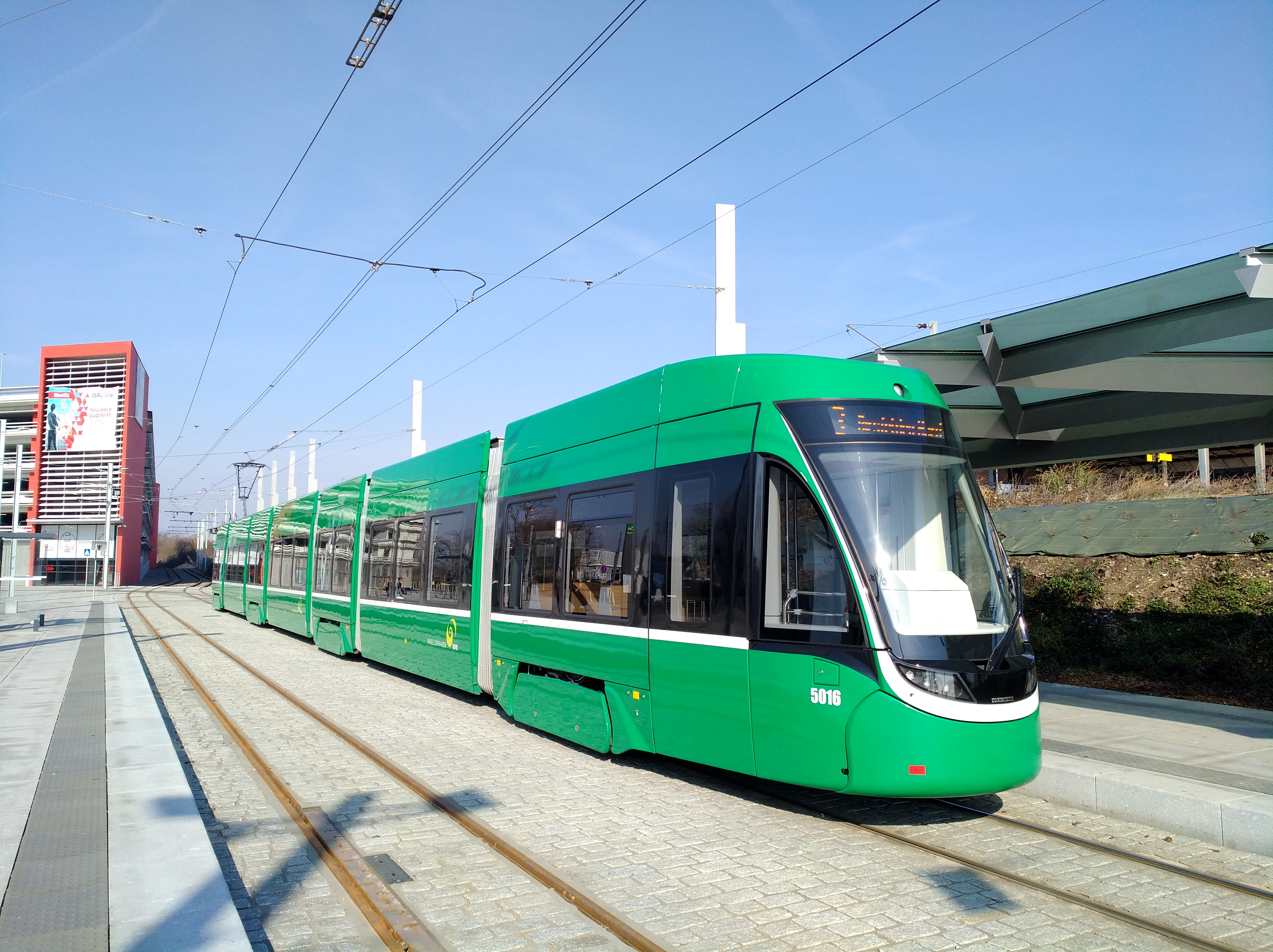
Flexity 2 tram from Basel in Saint-Louis, France.
