= International Public Partnerships =

British investment company

- Company type: Public
- Traded as: LSE: INPP; FTSE 250 component
- ISIN: GB00B188SR50
- Industry: Financial services, asset management
- Founded: 2006
- Headquarters: London, UK
- Key people: Rupert Dorey (Chairman)
- Website: Homepage

International Public Partnerships is a large British publicly listed investment company dedicated to infrastructure investments. Established in 2006 as Babcock & Brown Public Partnerships, the company adopted its present name on 25 June 2009. It is a constituent of the FTSE 250 Index. The chairman is Michael Gerrard.
